= Orange Is the New Black season 7 =

Orange Is the New Black
- Season 7
- Promotional poster
- Starring: Taylor Schilling; Natasha Lyonne; Uzo Aduba; Danielle Brooks; Jackie Cruz; Laura Gómez; Selenis Leyva; Taryn Manning; Adrienne C. Moore; Matt Peters; Jessica Pimentel; Dascha Polanco; Alysia Reiner; Elizabeth Rodriguez; Nick Sandow; Dale Soules; Yael Stone; Kate Mulgrew; Laura Prepon
- No. of episodes: 13

Release
- Original network: Netflix
- Original release: July 26, 2019

Season chronology
- ← Previous; Season 6

The seventh and final season of the American comedy-drama television series Orange Is the New Black premiered on Netflix on July 26, 2019, at 12:00 am PDT in multiple countries. It consists of thirteen episodes, each between 55 and 89 minutes. The series is based on Piper Kerman's memoir, Orange Is the New Black: My Year in a Women's Prison (2010), about her experiences at FCI Danbury, a minimum-security federal prison. The series was created and adapted for television by Jenji Kohan.

The season chronicles Piper's life after being released contrasted against the experiences of other prisoners, some of whom now reside in immigration detention centers.

== Cast and characters ==
=== Main cast ===
- Taylor Schilling as Piper Chapman, former inmate
- Natasha Lyonne as Nicky Nichols, inmate
- Uzo Aduba as Suzanne Warren, inmate
- Danielle Brooks as Tasha "Taystee" Jefferson, inmate
- Jackie Cruz as Marisol "Flaca" Gonzales, inmate
- Laura Gómez as Blanca Flores, inmate
- Selenis Leyva as Gloria Mendoza, inmate
- Taryn Manning as Tiffany "Pennsatucky" Doggett, inmate
- Adrienne C. Moore as Cindy "Black Cindy" Hayes, inmate
- Matt Peters as Joel Luschek, correctional officer
- Jessica Pimentel as Maria Ruiz, inmate
- Dascha Polanco as Dayanara "Daya" Diaz, inmate
- Alysia Reiner as Natalie Figueroa, warden / warden of the ICE Facility
- Elizabeth Rodriguez as Aleida Diaz, former inmate / inmate
- Nick Sandow as Joe Caputo, former warden
- Dale Soules as Frieda Berlin, inmate
- Yael Stone as Lorna Morello, inmate
- Kate Mulgrew as Galina "Red" Reznikov, inmate
- Laura Prepon as Alex Vause, inmate

=== Recurring cast ===
==== Inmates ====
- Lori Petty as Lolly Whitehill
- Daniella De Jesus as Irene "Zirconia" Cabrera
- Amanda Fuller as Madison "Badison" Murphy
- Sipiwe Moyo as Adeola Chinede
- Christina Toth as Annalisa Damiva
- Shannon Esper as Alana Dwight
- Finnerty Steeves as Beth Hoefler

==== Staff ====
- Catherine Curtin as Wanda Bell
- Joel Marsh Garland as Scott O'Neill
- Mike Houston as CO Lee Dixon
- Nick Dillenburg as CO Ryder Blake
- Hunter Emery as CO Rick Hopper
- Susan Heyward as CO / Warden Tamika Ward
- Josh Segarra as CO Stefanovic
- Emily Tarver as CO Artesian McCullough
- Greg Vrotsos as CO Hellman
- Nicholas Webber as CO Alvarez
- Shawna Hamic as CO Virginia "Ginger" Copeland
- Branden Wellington as CO Jarod Young

==== Detainees ====
- Karina Arroyave as Karla Córdova
- Marie-Lou Nahhas as Shani Abboud
- Melinna Bobadilla as Santos Chaj

==== Others ====
- Alicia Witt as Zelda
- Michael Chernus as Cal Chapman
- Tracee Shimo as Neri Feldman
- Bill Hoag as Bill Chapman
- Deborah Rush as Carol Chapman
- Berto Colon as Cesar Velazquez
- Ian Paola as Yadriel
- John Magaro as Vince Muccio
- Miguel Izaguirre as Dario "Diablo" Zuniga

=== Special guest stars ===
- Jason Biggs as Larry Bloom
- Diane Guerrero as Maritza Ramos
- Michael Harney as Sam Healy
- Laverne Cox as Sophia Burset
- Samira Wiley as Poussey Washington
- Lea DeLaria as Carrie "Big Boo" Black
- Pablo Schreiber as George "Pornstache" Mendez

=== Guest stars ===
- Maria Dizzia as Polly Harper
- Lauren Lapkus as Susan Fischer
- Annie Golden as Norma Romano
- Vicky Jeudy as Janae Watson
- Julie Lake as Angie Rice
- Emma Myles as Leanne Taylor
- Abigail Savage as Gina Murphy
- Constance Shulman as Erica "Yoga" Jones
- Lori Tan Chinn as Mei Chang
- Tamara Torres as Emily Germann
- Lin Tucci as Anita DeMarco
- Kimiko Glenn as Brook Soso
- Blair Brown as Judy King
- Kelly Karbacz as Kasey Sankey
- Amanda Stephen as Alison Abdullah
- Judith Roberts as Taslitz
- Vicci Martinez as Dominga "Daddy" Duarte

== Episodes ==
No. overall	No. in season	Title	Directed by	Written by	Featured character(s)	Original release date
79	1	"Beginning of the End"	Michael Trim	Jenji Kohan	Piper	July 26, 2019
Piper struggles to adapt to life after Litchfield. Now living with Cal and Neri, she is unable to pay her rent and probationary fees. She confronts her wealthy father, who is unwilling to support her financially. Alex attempts to get rid of Badison by planting a phone in Badison's dorm. However, Taystee finds the phone instead, which results in a violent confrontation that sends both her and Badison to the SHU. CO Hellman forces Alex to deal heroin until Badison returns. Aleida's kids have moved in at Hopper's residence. Lorna has given birth to a baby boy, Sterling. Daddy's infidelity angers Daya, who accidentally kills Daddy with an overdose of fentanyl as revenge. Flashback: Piper's life before prison is explored.
80	2	"Just Desserts"	Andrew McCarthy	Brian Chamberlayne	McCullough	July 26, 2019
Maritza, released on parole, connects with an NBA player whom she met at a club. Piper earns her keep by babysitting. Linda fires Figueroa from her interim warden position; Aleida pressures Hopper to try out for the warden position. Tamika wants to be promoted to head guard, and asks Caputo for advice. Though Linda had initially planned to hire Hopper, Linda is impressed with Tamika and hires her as the new warden. McCullough catches Alex trying to get rid of Hellman's drugs. Realizing that reporting Alex and Hellman for the drugs will do nothing, McCullough instead forces Alex to sell the heroin for her. Daya is determined to usurp Daddy's position in prison. Maritza is arrested during an ICE raid and is sent to the PolyCon detention facility. Flashback: In the military, McCullough is ostracized by her fellow male soldiers when she reports a sexual assault against a colleague.
81	3	"And Brown Is the New Orange"	Constantine Makris	Vera Santamaria	Blanca	July 26, 2019
Tamika begins her term as warden. Though Tamika is disheartened to learn she had only been hired for being black, she is inspired by Figueroa's advice to do whatever she wants. Tamika closes the SHU and transfers Badison to a Missouri prison. Maritza fails to prove her American citizenship. She also reunites with Blanca at the facility. Diablo visits Blanca, but he is taken into custody due to his expired green card. Suzanne tries to mend Taystee and Cindy's relationship, to no avail. Alex flushes Hellman's heroin down the toilet, and convinces McCullough to smuggle portable phone chargers instead. Piper begins working for her father's company. Red, Gloria, Nicky, Lorna, and Flaca are assigned to run the kitchen at the PolyCon facility where Maritza and Blanca are staying. Flashback: Blanca gets her green card and celebrates with Diablo. Later, Blanca covers up the hit-and-run of the elderly woman she cared for.
82	4	"How to Do Life"	Andrew McCarthy	Merritt Tierce	Gloria	July 26, 2019
Piper grapples with her new job. Maritza reunites with Flaca, who is able to contact Maritza's estranged mother. However, Flaca is told that Maritza was born in Colombia and does not have a U.S. birth certificate. Tamika creates new prison education programs; Maria and Cindy find solace in Caputo's restorative justice class, while Pennsatucky takes part in a GED course. Lorna finds out from her husband that Sterling had tragically died from pneumonia; Lorna refuses to accept Sterling's death and maintains the belief that her child is still alive. A suicidal Taystee tries to buy fentanyl from Daya, who has become the prison's kingpin. Daya refuses to make the offer. Taystee later attempts to hang herself, but she backs out at the last second. Flashback: Gloria moves to New York and chooses to leave her daughters in Puerto Rico, promising that they will be together eventually. When it is time for Gloria's daughters to relocate, they refuse to do so, resentful of Gloria's decision to move.
83	5	"Minority Deport"	Laura Prepon	Anthony Natoli	Aleida	July 26, 2019
Aleida is arrested when she beats up her daughter's drug dealer boyfriend. Piper and Cal shed their responsibilities for a day by drinking alcohol and getting high. When Piper is caught tampering with her drug test, she is ordered by her parole officer to attend Narcotics Anonymous meetings. Red starts to become forgetful. Taystee begins working as Tamika's assistant. However, Taystee plans to take advantage of her job by providing outside information to Daya, in hopes she will eventually get the drugs she had asked for. Cindy is up for early release. Blanca is able to extend her court date. Gloria gives Maritza a free number that can help her contact a lawyer, but when Maritza gives the number to other detainees, she is caught by the guards and deported to Colombia. Flashback: In her teenage years, Aleida dealt with many predatory men.
84	6	"Trapped in an Elevator"	Nick Sandow	Heather Jeng Bladt	Maria	July 26, 2019
Maria is shocked when Yadriel reveals that he and their daughter are moving in with his new girlfriend. Maria is initially enraged but, inspired by Caputo's assignment to reflect on who she has hurt, apologizes to Yadriel for not trusting how he's raising their daughter. Cindy, also inspired by Caputo's assignment, apologizes to her mother as her release date impends. Taystee exacts revenge on Cindy by writing a letter to Cindy's daughter, Monica, that reveals Cindy as her real mother. Alex and McCullough continue their smuggling operation. Linda closes down the psych ward. Caputo discovers that Susan Fischer, the female CO unfairly fired by Caputo in the second season, is accusing him of sexual harassment. Cindy is released from prison. Flashback: Maria—working at a clothing store—plans to leave Yadriel. After she is arrested for selling counterfeit goods, Maria and Yadriel solidify their relationship whens she reveals her pregnancy. It is implied that Yadriel may not be the baby's father.
85	7	"Me as Well"	Ludovic Littee	Tami Sagher	Pennsatucky	July 26, 2019
Nicky finds romance with Shani, one of the ICE detainees. Blanca bonds with Karla, who shows her an online legal library she can use to prepare her case. A lonely Piper follows Alex's advice to have sex with another person, though this only makes Piper want Alex more. McCullough kisses Alex. When Pennsatucky fails her GED practice test, her teacher determines she may have dyslexia and recommends Pennsatucky get a tutor. Caputo tries to apologize to Fischer. Daya sends Taystee on a mission to retrieve her phone taken during a sweep. Nicky finds Red, delirious, sitting in a freezer. Suzanne gives a journal to Taystee explaining what had happened the night Piscatella died. Tamika finds the journal and encourages Taystee to give this new information to her lawyer. Flashback: Pennsatucky reunites with her father and becomes subject to his ridicule; both of them are unaware of their exhibiting signs of dyslexia.
86	8	"Baker's Dozen"	Nick Sandow	Kirsa Rein	Red	July 26, 2019
After Tamika allots PolyCon's money towards the inmates' programs, a furious Linda prohibits her from extending the prison budget. Now unable to hire GED tutors, Tamika convinces Taystee to tutor Pennsatucky. Daya gives Taystee the fentanyl; Taystee hides the baggie behind a poster in Tamika's office. Aleida returns to prison and has a fiery reunion with Daya. Aleida cuts out Daya from her drug operation. Suzanne tends to the prison's new chicken coop. Nicky confronts Red about her worrying signs of dementia, but Red remains in denial of her condition. McCullough and Alex begin a sexual relationship. Neri takes Piper on a wilderness retreat. Piper bonds with a group member, Zelda. She confides to Zelda over her time in prison and her inability to adjust to the outside world. Flashback: With her rising status in the Russian mob, Red befriends a young man who ends up dead because of her advice.
87	9	"The Hidey Hole"	Natasha Lyonne	Hilary Weisman Graham	Lorna	July 26, 2019
Cindy's family breaks apart when Monica receives Taystee's letter. Though Cindy's mother, Lillian, advises her to make amends with Monica, Cindy decides to run away instead; Lillian orders her never to return. After being cut out by Aleida, Daya threatens the prison's GED teacher into becoming her new drug mule, which prompts the teacher to resign. Karla's request to attend her children's custody hearing is denied. Shani confides in Nicky about her traumatic childhood. Piper comes out as a felon to her co-workers. She also makes amends with her father. Fischer gets a restraining order against Caputo. Vince leaves Lorna over her inability to accept Sterling's death. A distraught Lorna attempts to leave the prison, putting the building into lockdown. Flashback: While on a night out, Lorna suffers a break up. Forced to walk home, Lorna accidentally causes the death of her two friends when she throws a rock at their moving car, which she believed was her boyfriend's.
88	10	"The Thirteenth"	Erin Feeley	Merritt Tierce	Alex	July 26, 2019
Lorna is found in the chicken coop and subsequently sent to medical. McCullough is left visibly shaken by the lockdown, and she is comforted by Alex. The lockdown also has consequences for Tamika, who is put on notice by Linda. When Red accidentally cuts herself in the kitchen, the doctor diagnoses her with early onset dementia. Shani finds out she is being deported. Maria apologizes to CO Dixon for her involvement in the riot. Caputo owns up to his misdeeds and informs Tamika of his resignation. Luschek takes over as the new teacher of the GED course. Piper decides to reconnect with Larry and Polly, and Zelda joins along; Piper and Zelda continue to flirt. Alex finds Zelda's social media and discovers her and Piper's relationship. A frustrated Alex continues her sexual relationship with McCullough. Flashback: The aftermath of key moments of Piper and Alex's relationship are seen from Alex's perspective.
89	11	"God Bless America"	Diego Velasco	Carolina Paiz	Karla, Shani & Santos	July 26, 2019
Zelda invites Piper to a posh fundraiser and admits she wants to start a relationship with her. Alex feels guilty about her infidelity, and she breaks up with McCullough. A heartbroken McCullough confronts Piper at her house and states that Alex needs to move on. Piper has sex with Zelda. Maria tries to make peace with Gloria. Nicky attempts to stop Lorna's transfer to Florida. Nicky consults with Vince and learns of Sterling's death. Aleida tips off the guards about Daya's hiding spots. Shani leaves a goodbye note for Nicky before she is deported. Figueroa is sympathetic towards Santos, a pregnant ICE detainee who was raped while trying to enter the United States. When Santos tries to naturally induce a miscarriage, Figueroa secretly smuggles in abortion pills for Santos. At her appeal, Blanca is able to buy more time by reopening her criminal case. Karla, however, is deported to El Salvador. Karla calls her kids with an emotional message through Gloria's illegal phone—the phone is later found by CO Bell. Flashback: Karla consoles her children, who are still grieving over their father's death. Shani is confronted by her family over her lesbianism. Santos is raped after being unable to pay for help in crossing the border.
90	12	"The Big House"	Phil Abraham	Brian Chamberlayne	Taystee	July 26, 2019
The guards begin interrogations over the illegal phone. Despite her release date approaching, Gloria confesses to owning the phone. Taystee consults with her lawyer and discovers that Suzanne's journal cannot be used as evidence for a trial. Discouraged by this news, Taystee plans to commit suicide with Daya's fentanyl. Nicky reluctantly lets Lorna get transferred to the Florida block. Hopper is fired after getting caught having sex with Aleida. McCullough informs Alex that Piper is seeing someone else. Alex confronts Piper in visitation; Alex confesses that she doesn't have any feelings for McCullough, but Piper admits she has feelings for Zelda. McCullough has Alex transferred to an Ohio prison. During the GED exam, Luschek fails to provide Pennsatucky extra time for her dyslexia. Believing she had flunked the test, Pennsatucky snorts fentanyl from Daya's crew and overdoses. Taystee later discovers Pennsatucky's unconscious body and cries for help. Flashback: During her brief release in season one, Taystee is kicked out of her group home and has no place to stay. She has an emotional phone call with Poussey, who had called her from Litchfield.
91	13	"Here's Where We Get Off"	Mark A. Burley	Jenji Kohan	none	July 26, 2019
Pennsatucky dies from her overdose. Taystee discovers Pennsatucky had passed her GED exam. Suzanne, having been Pennsatucky's roommate, sets up a memorial for her in the Florida block. Zelda invites Piper to join her on a trip to Northampton. Piper visits Alex and is told of Alex's transfer; Alex thinks they should break up, believing she is keeping Piper from new experiences. A conflicted Piper confides to Larry, who advises her to "do what new Piper would do." Luschek takes the fall for Gloria and claims he had smuggled in the cell phones, resulting in his termination. Taystee returns her baggie of fentanyl to Daya. Upon discovering that Daya had brought her younger siblings into the drug operation, Aleida angrily chokes Daya. A homeless Cindy makes amends with Lillian and Monica. Red is transferred to Florida and reunites with Lorna and Frieda, but Red does not remember who Frieda is. Caputo and Figueroa visit an adoption clinic. In El Salvador, Karla follows a smuggler in an effort to get back into the United States, but breaks her ankle and is left stranded in the desert. When a bottle of Hellman's drugs are found outside the prison, Linda fires Tamika on the spot. Hellman replaces Tamika as the new warden. The finale concludes with a montage delving into several characters' lives. Alex gets transferred to the Ohio prison, which houses many former Litchfield inmates: Big Boo, Anita, Yoga Jones, Gina, Norma, Leanne, Angie, Janae, Alison, Sankey, and Soso. Nicky becomes a new mother figure to several inmates. Flaca helps the detainees at the ICE facility. Gloria is released and reunites with her kids. Maria gets to see her baby daughter in visitation. Blanca wins her case and reunites with Diablo in Honduras. Mendez, released from prison, raises Daya's baby. With a little help from Judy King, Taystee starts the Poussey Washington Fund with Suzanne's assistance. Piper chooses to be with Alex, having moved to Ohio to start anew and easily visit Alex in prison.

== Alternative ending ==
Another ending was considered for the show with Piper telling her story to Jenji Kohan, who would make it into a TV series. When Jenji told it to her son, he told her that the show and fans deserved better than that.

== Production ==
In February 2016, Netflix gave the series a three-season renewal, which included its seventh season. In October 2018, it was confirmed that the seventh season would be its last. For the seventh season, Alysia Reiner was upgraded to series regular.

== Reception ==
=== Critical response ===
On Metacritic, season 7 has a score of 82 out of 100, based on 10 reviews, indicating "universal acclaim". On Rotten Tomatoes, it has a 97% rating with an average score of 7.69/10, based on 32 reviews. The site's consensus reads: "Carried by its exceptional ensemble, Orange Is the New Black's final season gets straight to the point, tackling hard-hitting issues with the same dramatic depth and gallows humor that made the show so ground-breaking to begin with".

=== Accolades ===
For the 72nd Primetime Emmy Awards, Laverne Cox received a nomination for Outstanding Guest Actress in a Drama Series.
