= Orange Is the New Black season 4 =

Orange Is the New Black
- Season 4
- Promotional poster
- Starring: Taylor Schilling; Natasha Lyonne; Uzo Aduba; Danielle Brooks; Jackie Cruz; Lea DeLaria; Michael Harney; Selenis Leyva; Taryn Manning; Adrienne C. Moore; Dascha Polanco; Nick Sandow; Yael Stone; Samira Wiley; Kate Mulgrew; Laura Prepon; Elizabeth Rodriguez
- No. of episodes: 13

Release
- Original network: Netflix
- Original release: June 17, 2016

Season chronology
- ← Previous; Season 3 Next → Season 5

The fourth season of the American comedy-drama television series Orange Is the New Black premiered on Netflix on June 17, 2016, at 12:00 am PST in multiple countries. It consists of thirteen episodes, each between 54–60 minutes, with a 77-minute finale. The series is based on Piper Kerman's memoir, Orange Is the New Black: My Year in a Women's Prison (2010), about her experiences at FCI Danbury, a minimum-security federal prison. The series is created and adapted for television by Jenji Kohan.

The season received critical acclaim, again winning the Screen Actors Guild Award for Outstanding Performance by an Ensemble in a Comedy Series and Outstanding Performance by a Female Actor in a Comedy Series for Uzo Aduba, and numerous other awards.

== Cast and characters ==
=== Main cast ===
- Taylor Schilling as Piper Chapman, inmate
- Natasha Lyonne as Nicky Nichols, inmate
- Uzo Aduba as Suzanne "Crazy Eyes" Warren, inmate
- Danielle Brooks as Tasha "Taystee" Jefferson, inmate
- Jackie Cruz as Marisol "Flaca" Gonzales, inmate
- Lea DeLaria as Carrie "Big Boo" Black, inmate
- Michael Harney as Sam Healy, correctional officer
- Selenis Leyva as Gloria Mendoza, inmate
- Taryn Manning as Tiffany "Pennsatucky" Doggett, inmate
- Adrienne C. Moore as Cindy "Black Cindy" Hayes, inmate
- Dascha Polanco as Dayanara "Daya" Diaz, inmate
- Nick Sandow as Joe Caputo, Director of Human Activities, later Warden
- Yael Stone as Lorna Morello, inmate
- Samira Wiley as Poussey Washington, inmate
- Kate Mulgrew as Galina "Red" Reznikov, inmate
- Laura Prepon as Alex Vause, inmate
- Elizabeth Rodriguez as Aleida Diaz, inmate

=== Recurring cast ===
==== Inmates ====
- Jessica Pimentel as Maria Ruiz
- Laverne Cox as Sophia Burset
- Annie Golden as Norma Romano
- Laura Gómez as Blanca Flores
- Diane Guerrero as Maritza Ramos
- Vicky Jeudy as Janae Watson
- Julie Lake as Angie Rice
- Emma Myles as Leanne Taylor
- Abigail Savage as Gina Murphy
- Constance Shulman as Erica "Yoga" Jones
- Lori Tan Chinn as Mei Chang
- Tamara Torres as Emily Germann
- Lin Tucci as Anita DeMarco
- Beth Fowler as Sister Jane Ingalls
- Kimiko Glenn as Brook Soso
- Dale Soules as Frieda Berlin
- Lori Petty as Lolly Whitehill
- Emily Althaus as Maureen Kukudio
- Blair Brown as Judy King
- Ruby Rose as Stella Carlin
- Rosal Colon as Carmen "Ouija" Aziza
- Francesca Curran as Helen "Skinhead Helen" Van Maele
- Daniella De Jesus as Irene "Zirconia" Cabrera
- Asia Kate Dillon as Brandy Epps
- Shannon Esper as Alana Dwight
- Arianda Fernandez as Michelle Carreras
- Kelly Karbacz as Kasey Sankey
- Miriam Morales as Ramona "Pidge" Contreras
- Jolene Purdy as Stephanie Hapakuka
- Amanda Stephen as Alison Abdullah

==== Staff ====
- Catherine Curtin as Wanda Bell
- Joel Marsh Garland as Scott O'Neill
- Matt Peters as Joel Luschek
- Alysia Reiner as Natalie "Fig" Figueroa
- Brendan Burke as Wade Donaldson
- Alan Aisenberg as Baxter "Gerber" Bayley
- Beth Dover as Linda Ferguson / "Amelia Von Barlow"
- Jimmy Gary Jr. as Felix Rikerson
- James McMenamin as Charlie "Donuts" Coates
- Mike Birbiglia as Danny Pearson
- Nick Dillenburg as Ryder Blake
- Evan Arthur Hall as Stratman
- Mike Houston as Lee Dixon
- Brad William Henke as Desi Piscatella
- John Palladino as Josh
- Emily Tarver as Artesian McCullough
- Michael Torpey as Thomas "Humps" Humphrey

==== Others ====
- Michael Chernus as Cal Chapman
- Tanya Wright as Crystal Burset
- Ian Paola as Yadriel
- John Magaro as Vince Muccio

== Episodes ==
No. overall	No. in season	Title	Directed by	Written by	Featured character(s)	Original release date
40	1	"Work That Body for Me"	Andrew McCarthy	Jenji Kohan	none	June 17, 2016
Caputo is promoted to Director of Human Activity, and he gets new COs to round up the prisoners who are at the lake. Piscatella, one of the new COs, is strict on security and obedience, and is feared by both guards and inmates; he is made captain of the guards. Maureen wants to escape the prison with Suzanne, but Suzanne decides to go back to the prison; Maureen is eventually recaptured by Caputo. The new inmates are integrated with the old inmates, and everyone gets a bunkmate: Red's bunkmate snores loudly, to Red's annoyance. Judy King becomes a prisoner at Litchfield and forms a bond with Luschek. She is given special treatment and is provided her own private room. In the greenhouse, Alex is choked by Kubra's enforcer, Aydin; Lolly walks in and repeatedly kicks Aydin until he is unconscious. They both presume he is dead. Alex later sneaks into the greenhouse and realizes that Aydin is still breathing; she smothers him to death. In the morning, Frieda discovers Aydin’s body, and with Frieda’s assistance, Alex and Lolly cut the body into smaller parts and bury it under plants in the garden.
41	2	"Power Suit"	Constantine Makris	Sara Hess	Maria	June 17, 2016
The inmates struggle with the overcrowding of the prison. Healy gets Judy King a new roommate, Yoga Jones; their special treatment is witnessed by Taystee. Cindy battles with her new roommate, Alison, over shared space. Red attempts to stop her bunkmate's snoring, to no avail. Piper befriends her bunkmate, who becomes her bodyguard. Pennsatucky worries that Maritza is being raped by Coates. Gloria sends word to Crystal that Sophia is in the SHU; she tries to talk to Caputo about letting her out, but he does not listen. Caputo meets with MCC; in order to qualify for government cutbacks, they decide to hire veterans as COs who will be housed at cabins on campus. Caputo befriends Linda from Purchasing at the meeting. Daya is worried about her baby being placed in foster care, as Cesar is going to jail for conspiracy to commit murder and assaulting a police officer. Racial tension arises as the Dominicans realize that they are the majority. Maria leads an attack on a white inmate in defense of Blanca. Flashback: Maria's father was the head of a drug ring. As a teenager, Maria spots Yadriel running from the police outside her house. Maria later discovers the drugs he threw in the bushes; Maria throws them into her window in order to save Yadriel. Her father kicks her out later and Yadriel welcomes her.
42	3	"(Don't) Say Anything"	Andrew McCarthy	Jim Danger Gray	Soso	June 17, 2016
Taystee gets switched from janitorial duties to being Caputo's assistant. Red is both angry and jealous over Judy's special treatment. Piper loses employees in her illegal panty business, as they believe it is becoming too dangerous. Maria tries to help her fellow Dominicans by asking Piper if they could join her business, but Piper declines, stating that she doesn't want thugs. In response, the Dominicans start their own panty business. Caputo goes on a date with Linda. Soso and Poussey grow closer together. Poussey, a big fan of Judy King, gets nervous every time she is around Judy. Soso talks to Judy, explaining why Poussey acts weird in front of her, but she lies about Poussey's past in order to gain Judy’s acceptance. When Judy informs Poussey about what Soso had said, Poussey is insulted that Soso knows nothing about her. Soso apologizes and promises to make an effort to know her. Lolly begins to crack and attempts to dig up Aydin's body in the garden. Frieda clocks Lolly’s instability and believes they will have to kill Lolly. Flashback: It is shown that in Soso's past, she exaggerated the truth to be accepted.
43	4	"Doctor Psycho"	Erin Feeley	Carly Mensch	Healy	June 17, 2016
In the SHU, Sophia gets Caputo's attention by flooding her cell. Later, Sophia lights her mattress on fire using a lightbulb, and the guards are forced to evacuate the SHU's inmates. Healy forces Judy to lead a cooking class. The class is a success, but Judy asks Caputo to change Healy as her counselor, stating that he has power issues. Flaca and Maritza quit working for Piper in favor of working for Maria's business. Alex confides Frieda's plan to kill Lolly to Red. Red initially tries to mediate the situation, but eventually agrees with Frieda. Aleida finds out she is up for early release. Lolly's erratic behavior leads to Healy becoming her counselor. Lolly admits to Healy that she killed Aydin in the greenhouse; Healy believes Lolly is being delusional and successfully convinces her that the killing is merely her imagination. Flashback: Healy's mentally ill mother wants to stop her psychiatric treatment, as it makes her forget. When a young Healy encourages her to continue the treatment, his mother runs away. Years later, Healy mistakes a homeless lady resembling his mother. He invites his "mother" for coffee, apologizing for not being there when she needed help, before discovering the homeless lady's true identity.
44	5	"We'll Always Have Baltimore"	Tricia Brock	Jordan Harrison	Maritza	June 17, 2016
Due to the recent economies, the prison starts to run thin on certain supplies, causing a black market around the prison. The guards start targeting the non-white prisoners and subjecting them to random searches. While Caputo attends a convention for prison employees with Linda, Taystee manages to guess the password to Caputo's computer and gets access to the internet. At the convention, Caputo gets arrested after getting into an altercation with Danny Pearson, who attempts to use the event to speak out against the system. Linda is turned on and has sex with Caputo in a closet. In an effort to stop Maria from cutting into her panty business, Piper is given permission by Piscatella to form a security group. During their first meeting, the all-white volunteers begin to openly voice racist sentiments. Piper is horrified to realize she has accidentally created a white power group. Flashback: Maritza's life of crime expands from defrauding customers as a cocktail waitress to grand theft auto.
45	6	"Piece of Shit"	Uta Briesewitz	Lauren Morelli	none	June 17, 2016
During her janitorial stint in maximum security, Nicky encounters Sophia in isolation and gives her a magazine to read. Later, Nicky is asked to clean Sophia's empty cell, which is covered in blood. Luschek feels guilty about his role in landing Nicky in maximum security; Judy decides to have her powerful lawyers arrange to have Nicky sent back to Litchfield. However, Nicky's anger has caused her to relapse into her heroin addiction. Taystee tries to get a picture of Judy to sell to a magazine using the internet connection in Caputo's office. Cindy and Alison bond over their disdain of Scientology. Poussey and Soso declare their love for each other. Piper plants a set of panties in Maria's bunk and arranges for them to be discovered, which results in Piscatella recommending that Maria gets three to five years added to her sentence.
46	7	"It Sounded Nicer in My Head"	Mark A. Burley	Nick Jones	Lolly	June 17, 2016
Nicky continues her self-destructive drug binge as she returns to minimum security. Red, who had planned to throw a "welcome back party" for Nicky, quickly becomes aware of Nicky's relapse. Lolly finds a friend in a kindly Healy, and she secretly builds a "time machine" out of cardboard. In the time machine, she and Healy both reflect over wanting to go back in time. Outside the prison, Judy King faces backlash when old footage of her hosting a racist puppet show goes viral. Caputo submits a plan to offer educational courses to the inmates in order to give them something useful to do during their incarceration. Aleida is inspired to begin a nail salon business once she is released. Piper realizes her power has corrupted her, and though she takes steps to make amends, a plan of revenge is already in motion. At Nicky's party, Piper gets kidnapped by Maria and her gang, who brand the Nazi swastika into her arm. Flashback: Lolly works as a journalist for a newspaper company until her mental illness takes over, leaving her homeless on the streets.
47	8	"Friends in Low Places"	Phil Abraham	Alex Regnery & Hartley Voss	none	June 17, 2016
Piper has hit rock bottom after being attacked by Maria and her crew. Maria is selling drugs out of Aleida's salon, which worries Aleida as her release date approaches. Coates makes a heartfelt apology to Pennsatucky, who appears moved. Caputo and Linda continue their relationship, though he is disappointed that his education program has had all of its humanities courses replaced with more cost-effective vocational training. Crystal shows up at Caputo's house demanding to get answers about Sophia; Linda turns a gun on Crystal to get her off the property. In an attempt to prove to the world that she's not racist, Judy kisses Cindy, which Poussey takes a picture of using Luschek's cell phone. Piper reveals her swastika scar to Alex and Nicky; Alex also confesses her murderous secret. Their 'family' reunites, and Red further brands Piper's swastika to alter it into a window.
48	9	"Turn Table Turn"	Constantine Makris	Sara Hess	Blanca	June 17, 2016
Blanca rebels against the COs by applying foul-smelling substances on her body in order to stop them from frisking her. When Blanca refuses to shower, the COs force Blanca to stand on a cafeteria table until she relents. Boo turns her back on Pennsatucky when she decides to forgive Coates. Morello becomes paranoid that her sister is having an affair with her husband. Red breaks down over Nicky's relapse, which makes Nicky decide to get clean again. News of Judy and Cindy's fake relationship spreads after Luschek sells the picture to the tabloids. Piscatella orders Luschek and the other guards to search the prison, but the phone used for Judy is kept secret by Luschek. Sister Ingalls purposely gets sent to the SHU in order to reunite with Sophia. CO Humphrey punishes Maritza for her part in the smuggling scheme by forcing her to eat a baby mouse in the COs cabin. Flashback: Blanca works as a housekeeper and nurse for a demanding elderly woman. When Blanca is seen flirting with the gardener, Diablo, the old woman has Diablo fired. Blanca gets her revenge by having sex with him in front of the old woman.
49	10	"Bunny, Skull, Bunny, Skull"	Phil Abraham	Carly Mensch	none	June 17, 2016
Blanca continues to take her stand in the cafeteria, and Piper is forced to join her when she tries to smuggle Blanca food. Sister Ingalls manages to sneak a message to Sophia in the SHU, but her plan to expose Sophia's treatment backfires when Caputo finds her secret phone. Caputo ultimately sends the picture to the press himself, rebelling against MCC. Maritza tearfully reveals to Flaca what Humphrey forced her to do in the cabin. Morello encourages Suzanne to get a second chance with Maureen. Suzanne and Maureen meet in the broom closet, and Maureen initiates a sexual encounter. However, Maureen then leaves Suzanne in the closet, still resentful of Suzanne for abandoning her in the woods. Aleida is released from prison and struggles to adapt to the outside world. After discovering that her cousin had sold most of her possessions, Aleida is forced to stay with Cesar's girlfriend, Margarita. The groundsmen discover Aydin's body in the garden.
50	11	"People Persons"	Lev L. Spiro	Nick Jones	Suzanne	June 17, 2016
Following the discovery of the body in the garden, the prison goes into lockdown. Piscatella defies Caputo's orders and begins interrogating inmates, including Red, Suzanne, and Maureen. While holed up with the guards, Suzanne faces the wrath of Maureen; Humphrey takes enjoyment in their clash and forces Suzanne to fight her, causing Suzanne to explode and nearly beat Maureen to death. Judy, Yoga Jones, and Luschek have a drug fueled threesome. Pennsatucky assists Nicky, who is going through drug withdrawal. Healy, now realizing that Lolly's confession to killing Aydin is true, wrestles with the idea of handing Lolly in. He nearly commits suicide before deciding to face his problems, and he reluctantly hands Lolly in to Piscatella. Lolly is subsequently sent to Psych A. Flashback: Suzanne works at a grocery store where she is well-liked by customers. One day, Suzanne innocently invites a young boy whom she had met at the grocery store into her apartment. When the young boy becomes distressed and attempts to leave the apartment through the window, the boy slips off the fire escape and falls to his death.
51	12	"The Animals"	Matthew Weiner	Lauren Morelli	Bayley	June 17, 2016
Caputo attempts to suspend Humphrey for instigating Suzanne's fight with Maureen. However, Piscatella threatens to have all the COs walk out if he does so, and informs Caputo that he no longer has any real authority. Healy grapples over his decision to send Lolly to Psych, and he signs himself into a mental health facility. Pennsatucky reunites with Boo. Judy King and Poussey bond. Sophia returns to the prison. The different prison families come together to discuss a plan to force Piscatella out and restore order to the prison. Though they initially fail to come to an agreement, Piscatella's unfair treatment of Red unites the inmates. They stand on tables in a peaceful protest, refusing to move until Piscatella resigns; Piscatella orders his men to remove them by force. As guards fill the cafeteria, Suzanne breaks down and Poussey rushes to her aid; CO Bayley quickly reacts and improperly restrains Poussey, which makes her unable to breathe. As a result, Poussey suffocates and dies on the cafeteria floor. Flashback: In the past, Bayley's decision to become a prison guard is explored.
52	13	"Toast Can't Never Be Bread Again"	Adam Bernstein	Tara Herrmann & Jenji Kohan	Poussey	June 17, 2016
Following Poussey's death, MCC tells Caputo to hold off on calling the police until they can develop an angle, while Taystee urges Caputo to call Poussey's dad and break the news to him. Soso finds Suzanne, in the library, trapped under a fallen shelf. Suzanne is sent to medical, and she gets put next to Maureen, who is still recovering from her injuries. Piper discovers that Alex has been leaving notes around the prison that reveals Aydin's real name. The two of them track down the notes and prepare to burn them. MCC grants release to Judy King, who is distraught over Poussey's death. Caputo ignores the MCC prep, and on-camera refuses to fire Bayley. Taystee overhears, and snaps—she incites the other inmates, who all march through the hallways of the prison. They converge in a hallway where Judy King is being escorted out. Humphrey instinctively pulls out a gun, but Maritza pushes him over, and it slides across to the Hispanics; Daya picks it up. Daya takes Humphrey and CO McCullough hostage, and she cocks the gun and takes aim at Humphrey's head, while all the inmates present collectively urge her to pull the trigger. Flashback: Poussey has a fun night with strangers she meets in New York City.

== Production ==
The series was renewed for a fourth season on April 15, 2015, prior to its third-season premiere. For the fourth season, Jackie Cruz and Lea DeLaria were promoted to series regulars; with Elizabeth Rodriguez also being promoted by the season's sixth episode.

== Reception ==
=== Critical reception ===
The fourth season received critical acclaim. On Metacritic, it has a score of 86 out of 100 based on 19 reviews. On Rotten Tomatoes, it has a 95% rating with an average score of 8.6 out of 10 based on 39 reviews. The site's critical consensus reads: "Orange is the New Black is back and better than ever, with a powerful fourth season full of compelling performances by the ensemble cast." James Poniewozik of The New York Times reviewed the fourth season as "Do you measure the quality of a TV season as a beginning-to-end average or by how well it ends? By the first yardstick, Season 4 is ambitious but uneven; by the latter, it's the series' best."
