= Orange Is the New Black season 5 =

Orange Is the New Black
- Season 5
- Promotional poster
- Starring: Taylor Schilling; Natasha Lyonne; Uzo Aduba; Danielle Brooks; Jackie Cruz; Lea DeLaria; Michael Harney; Selenis Leyva; Taryn Manning; Adrienne C. Moore; Jessica Pimentel; Dascha Polanco; Elizabeth Rodriguez; Nick Sandow; Yael Stone; Kate Mulgrew; Laura Prepon
- No. of episodes: 13

Release
- Original network: Netflix
- Original release: June 9, 2017

Season chronology
- ← Previous; Season 4 Next → Season 6

The fifth season of the American comedy-drama television series Orange Is the New Black premiered on Netflix on June 9, 2017, at 12:00 am PST in multiple countries. It consists of thirteen episodes, each between 51 and 60 minutes. The series is based on Piper Kerman's memoir, Orange Is the New Black: My Year in a Women's Prison (2010), about her experiences at FCI Danbury, a minimum-security federal prison. The series is created and adapted for television by Jenji Kohan.

== Cast and characters ==
=== Main cast ===
- Taylor Schilling as Piper Chapman, inmate
- Natasha Lyonne as Nicky Nichols, inmate
- Uzo Aduba as Suzanne "Crazy Eyes" Warren, inmate
- Danielle Brooks as Tasha "Taystee" Jefferson, inmate
- Jackie Cruz as Marisol "Flaca" Gonzales, inmate
- Lea DeLaria as Carrie "Big Boo" Black, inmate
- Michael Harney as Sam Healy, correctional officer (Note: Michael J. Harney was credited as main cast for season 5 but did not make a single appearance.)
- Selenis Leyva as Gloria Mendoza, inmate
- Taryn Manning as Tiffany "Pennsatucky" Doggett, inmate
- Adrienne C. Moore as Cindy "Black Cindy" Hayes, inmate
- Jessica Pimentel as Maria Ruiz, inmate
- Dascha Polanco as Dayanara "Daya" Diaz, inmate
- Elizabeth Rodriguez as Aleida Diaz, former inmate
- Nick Sandow as Joe Caputo, warden
- Yael Stone as Lorna Morello, inmate
- Kate Mulgrew as Galina "Red" Reznikov, inmate
- Laura Prepon as Alex Vause, inmate

=== Special guest stars ===
- Jason Biggs as Larry Bloom
- Samira Wiley as Poussey Washington

=== Recurring cast ===
==== Inmates ====
- Laverne Cox as Sophia Burset
- Annie Golden as Norma Romano
- Laura Gómez as Blanca Flores
- Diane Guerrero as Maritza Ramos
- Vicky Jeudy as Janae Watson
- Julie Lake as Angie Rice
- Emma Myles as Leanne Taylor
- Abigail Savage as Gina Murphy
- Constance Shulman as Erica "Yoga" Jones
- Lori Tan Chinn as Mei Chang
- Tamara Torres as Emily Germann
- Lin Tucci as Anita DeMarco
- Kimiko Glenn as Brook Soso
- Dale Soules as Frieda Berlin
- Emily Althaus as Maureen Kukudio
- Blair Brown as Judy King
- Rosal Colon as Carmen "Ouija" Aziza
- Francesca Curran as Helen "Skinhead Helen" Van Maele
- Daniella De Jesus as Irene "Zirconia" Cabrera
- Asia Kate Dillon as Brandy Epps
- Shannon Esper as Alana Dwight
- Arianda Fernandez as Michelle Carreras
- Kelly Karbacz as Kasey Sankey
- Miriam Morales as Ramona "Pidge" Contreras
- Jolene Purdy as Stephanie Hapakuka
- Amanda Stephen as Alison Abdullah

==== Staff ====
- Catherine Curtin as Wanda Bell
- Joel Marsh Garland as Scott O'Neill
- Matt Peters as Joel Luschek
- Alysia Reiner as Natalie "Fig" Figueroa
- Alan Aisenberg as Baxter "Gerber" Bayley
- Beth Dover as Linda Ferguson / "Amelia Von Barlow"
- Jimmy Gary Jr. as Felix Rikerson
- James McMenamin as Charlie "Donuts" Coates
- Nick Dillenburg as Ryder Blake
- Evan Arthur Hall as Stratman
- Mike Houston as Lee Dixon
- Brad William Henke as Desi Piscatella
- John Palladino as Josh
- Emily Tarver as Artesian McCullough
- Michael Torpey as Thomas "Humps" Humphrey

==== Others ====
- Berto Colon as Cesar
- Deborah Rush as Carol Chapman
- Ian Paola as Yadriel
- Bill Sage as Governor Hutchinson
- John Magaro as Vince Muccio
- Mary Steenburgen as Delia Powell-Mendez (guest)

== Episodes ==
No. overall	No. in season	Title	Directed by	Written by	Featured character(s)	Original release date
53	1	"Riot FOMO"	Andrew McCarthy	Jenji Kohan	none	June 9, 2017
The prison erupts into a riot when the inmates are not satisfied with Caputo's handling of Poussey's death. Daya shoots CO Humphrey in the thigh. His life is eventually saved by Sophia, who has paramedic training from her days as a firefighter. Piper and Alex find Linda hiding in the bathroom and attempt to make a deal with her. Upon realizing that the entrances are closed, Piper and Alex disguise Linda as an inmate. Taystee, Cindy, Janae and Alison force Caputo to read a statement about Poussey's death, which Taystee records on an iPad. Josh, a PR representative from MCC who was visiting Caputo, helps her upload it to Twitter, since he thinks the story of a renegade CO reflects better on the company than out-of-control inmates. Daya attempts to contact Aleida, but an unseen person knocks her unconscious and steals the gun from her.
54	2	"Fuck, Marry, Frieda"	Constantine Makris	Jordan Harrison	Frieda	June 9, 2017
The prison stays under control of the inmates, who are holding several corrections officers hostage. The Hispanics force the COs to strip down to their underwear in front of a packed chapel and make very intimate searches of the COs. The video of Caputo, meant to spark outrage, instead gets mocked with memes. Humphrey, who is suffering major blood loss, has a stroke in the prison infirmary, which is staffed by a nurse only. Daya, nearing an emotional breakdown worrying over her future, claims she lost the gun. McCullough, however, suspects the gun is gone. Taystee uploads a photo of all the COs, plus Caputo and Josh, in their underwear. It is revealed that Frieda has a secret "bunker" stocked with food that she had built out of an unused pool that was never filled in. Flashback: Frieda's life as a child during the Cuban Missile Crisis reveals that her father was paranoid about the Soviet Union and a nuclear war; he had an underground bunker in the woods stocked with food and weapons.
55	3	"Pissters!"	Phil Abraham	Rebecca Angelo & Lauren Schuker Blum	Linda	June 9, 2017
Worried over the public backlash—and Judy King—MCC decides to meet the inmates' demands. Linda tries to fit in with the inmates, but is shocked at the substandard conditions of the prison. Piper and Alex, looking at Linda's phone, are shocked to find photos of her kissing Caputo. The inmates work together to compile a list of demands, which includes reinstating the GED program, better healthcare, amnesty for the inmates involved in the riot, the arrest of Bayley for Poussey's death, and Flaming Hot Cheetos. Bayley goes to the police station and tries to confess for Poussey's death, but the police dismiss him as a drunk veteran and put him in the drunk tank. A frightened Judy King attempts to escape, but is instead attacked by the white supremacists. The COs, locked in a room, plot to regain control of the prison after McCullough reveals that the inmates do not have the gun anymore. As they prepare to attack the inmates, Caputo sees Linda among them. Flashback: Linda's college days in a sorority in the 1990s show that, while at a party, Linda had left her drunk friend outside in the snow. The friend ended up freezing to death.
56	4	"Litchfield's Got Talent"	Nick Sandow	Josh Koenigsberg, Jenji Kohan & Tara Herrmann	Alison	June 9, 2017
The COs abort their mission to attack on Caputo's command. Angie and Leanne try to pants Gloria, and the gun falls to the crowd, which they recover. The two meth heads want the COs to perform a talent show for their enjoyment. Suzanne sets up a shrine on the spot of Poussey's death and organizes a séance. Blanca and Red raid the administrative files looking for dirt on the COs; they discover that Piscatella was transferred from a male prison after the death of an inmate discovered in the shower with burns on 80% of his body. Sophia surrenders herself in order to reunite with Sister Ingalls, only to discover that a sick Ingalls had been given compassionate release. Judy King is tied to a board by the white supremacists, who believe she has a stash of food. Judy faints when they attempt to throw her off the prison roof. A news helicopter suddenly arrives, taking photos and recordings of Judy tied up and unconscious. Flashback: Alison persuades her husband to accept a polygamous lifestyle because she feels overwhelmed by the time constraints of the housework and raising their daughter. Alison becomes jealous when another woman moves in.
57	5	"Sing It, White Effie"	Phil Abraham	Molly Smith Metzler	Janae	June 9, 2017
The video of Judy King is widely misreported as a terrorist attack against Christians. The governor is livid about MCC's passive stance and sends his own team to Litchfield. On the outside, Aleida struggles to find employment. Gloria calls Aleida, but is unable to tell her about Daya. Taystee and her friends free Judy in order to stop the disinformation about the situation. Taystee faces the press with an emotional speech about the truth, including how Judy was kept separate from the inmates due to her wealth and status, before releasing Judy to the press. Angie and Leanne find Coates in the laundry room. They plan to take him hostage, but Pennsatucky grabs the gun from Angie's waistband. She throws the gun to Coates and it accidentally fires, shooting Leanne in the finger. Coates uses the weapon to escape the prison and head outside, but he faints when the CERT approach him with guns drawn. Flashback: A teenaged Janae tours an elite prep school and is mesmerized by the wealth and depth of education. She witnesses a rehearsal for the school's all-white production of Dreamgirls and is shocked by a white girl performing in an Afro wig. Returning to her school, she is discouraged by her poor conditions and develops a negative attitude.
58	6	"Flaming Hot Cheetos, Literally"	Andrew McCarthy	Lauren Morelli	Taystee	June 9, 2017
The inmates receive numerous boxes containing Hot Cheetos and tampons from the governor. Taystee realizes that accepting the treats puts them in a position in which they owe the authorities the release of the hostages; Piper helps Taystee confiscate all the treats. The inmates organize a mock trial for Pennsatucky, as she had helped Coates escape the prison with the gun. Big Boo acts as Doggett's representative. Pennsatucky is ultimately given community service as her sentence. Aleida appears on the local news to talk about her experiences at Litchfield, though the interview is disastrous. Morello and Nicky have sex and Morello realizes she is pregnant. Janae consoles Soso. Bayley attempts to commit suicide by drinking bottles of paint dye, which turns out to be non-toxic. Frieda reveals the existence of her secret bunker to various inmates. Taystee faces the press and sets all of the governor's treats on fire. Flashback: While living in a group home, Taystee meets her birth mother, Mia, who was fifteen when she got pregnant. Mia now has a husband and a young daughter, but does not wish to inform them about Taystee. Taystee, who mistakenly believed she was going to live with her mother, runs away.
59	7	"Full Bush, Half Snickers"	Uta Briesewitz	Anthony Natoli	none	June 9, 2017
As Suzanne begins to spiral, Cindy forces the imprisoned guards to clean the bunks and keep Suzanne company. Poussey's friends try to honor her memory; Soso wants it to be something that Poussey would have wanted, and they reinvigorate the library by putting books all over the prison. Taystee, who had initially clashed with Soso over the memorial, apologizes to her. A distraught Vince leaves Morello when she, in a grand gesture, announces her pregnancy in front of the press. In order to expose Piscatella's murder of a male inmate, Red and Blanca attempt to entice Piscatella into the prison using Humphrey's phone. When Red fails to unlock the phone, she cuts off Humphrey's fingertip in order to use his thumbprint. Linda has sex with Big Boo. When some of the inmates create a makeshift coffee bar, Leanne and Angie secretly steal the coffee, inciting another violent riot.
60	8	"Tied to the Tracks"	Michael Trim	Carolina Paiz	Daya	June 9, 2017
Using Humphrey's phone, Red and Blanca send text messages to Piscatella, encouraging him to break into the prison via a window at night. Piscatella takes the information to the CERT, who blow him off. Aleida does an interview with Judy King, who reveals that Humphrey was shot. Aleida discovers that Daya was the shooter. The news about Humphrey reaches the CERT members, who mock Piscatella. Gloria learns that her son is in the ICU after being severely beaten. Figueroa returns to the prison as a MCC negotiator to talk about the inmates' demands. When Figueroa is informed about Humphrey, she states that amnesty for all the inmates is a no-go. Taystee agrees to hand over Daya, who first calls Mendez's mother, asking her to adopt her daughter out of foster care. Daya also asks Mendez's mother to give the child some space, due to Aleida's control she received when she was younger. Piscatella, after texting "Humphrey" that he is opting out of breaking in, enters the prison after dark instead. Flashback: A 14-year-old Daya pursues a boy based on her mother's insistence, despite her best friend's feelings for him. Daya ends up getting rejected by the boy and dumped by her friend.
61	9	"The Tightening"	Erin Feeley	Jordan Harrison	Red	June 9, 2017
Red, coming down from her drug high, is nursed by Nicky, who believes Red's warnings about Piscatella being in the prison are hallucinations. Piscatella, in full riot gear, attacks Blanca in a utility room. Inmates soon begin disappearing one by one, including Nicky and Boo. Gloria begs Caputo—who is locked in a Porta-Potty—to give her furlough to see her son, but Caputo states he cannot help her until she lets the hostages go. After Boo disappears, Linda desperately seeks out Caputo, who is let out by Taystee to back up the inmates' claim of slave labor to Figueroa. Morello, hurt by Nicky's comments that her pregnancy is all in her head, convinces Suzanne to stop taking her psych medicine. Red finds Frieda's map to her secret bunker, and she accidentally discovers Piscatella's prisoners while on her way there. However, while trying to free them, Piscatella arrives. Flashback: In the late 1970s, Red is in the Soviet Union working a menial factory job. Her rebellious friend, Nadezhda, suddenly vanishes. Red's ex-boyfriend, Dmitri—whom she had dumped for being too dull—proposes they lie about being Jewish in order to escape to the United States, as Jews were being allowed to immigrate to countries other than Israel.
62	10	"The Reverse Midas Touch"	Laura Prepon	Rebecca Angelo & Lauren Schuker Blum	Piscatella	June 9, 2017
Piscatella has Red, Piper, Alex and other inmates tied up in a room, where he uses a knife to cut off Red's hair and brutally breaks Alex's arm. Piper gets the duct tape off her mouth and yells for help, which is heard by the other inmates holed up in Frieda's basement bunker. The entrance to the room they are in leads to where Piscatella is. Meanwhile, Gloria tries to free the prison guards, but she is interrupted. Maureen, who has still not recovered from the beating, is found delirious in the bathroom by Suzanne, who takes her to the infirmary. Suzanne, by now in a psychotic state, discovers that Humphrey is dead. Gina lures Piscatella into the basement, where Frieda knocks him out with a homemade poison dart. Flashback: At his earlier CO job in a male prison, Piscatella pursues an affair with an inmate, Driscoll. When another inmate, Resado, spies on them together in the kitchen, Resado and other inmates beat and rape Driscoll in a bathroom. Piscatella handcuffs Resado to a shower and leaves him under scalding hot water to die.
63	11	"Breaking the Fiberboard Ceiling"	Wendey Stanzler	Lauren Morelli	none	June 9, 2017
The inmates drag the unconscious Piscatella into Frieda's bunker. Gina reveals she recorded a video of Piscatella assaulting Alex, and they post it on the internet. Gloria, desperate to see her son in the hospital, tries sneaking each of the hostage guards outside and locking them into a Porta-Potty one at a time. While attempting to negotiate with Figueroa, Taystee discovers she has a knack for advocacy. Boo is crushed when she sees a photo of her and Caputo on Linda's phone. Suzanne goes into a psychotic break, but Morello, in the dispensary, refuses to give Suzanne her medicine. Cindy takes a bottle of lithium, which she believes can help calm Suzanne down. Morello takes a pregnancy test and confirms that she is pregnant. While her unconscious son is taken into surgery, Gloria confesses her plan to Maria. Gloria discovers that the guards have escaped through a hole in the fence thanks to Maria, who had hoped that Gloria's deal would be given to her instead. Gloria breaks down and attempts to escape through the hole, but she is stopped by the other inmates who realize what she had been planning.
64	12	"Tattoo You"	Mark A. Burley	Tara Herrmann & Carolina Paiz	Piper & Alex	June 9, 2017
MCC makes an offer to Taystee that reaches most of the inmates' demands, but Taystee rejects the offer, as Bayley has not been prosecuted for Poussey's death. The hostage guards—except Luschek—are led to MCC management by Maria. As it was not Taystee who sent out the guards as part of an acceptance of the negotiation, MCC decides to send the CERT into the prison to end the riot. Morello reveals numerous positive pregnancy tests to Nicky, who calls Vince and convinces him to take responsibility. Pennsatucky escapes the prison using the hole in the fence, and she breaks into the guards' cabin. Bayley travels by bus to meet Poussey's father; he tearfully apologizes for her death. Poussey's father refuses to accept, stating that Bayley's punishment will be having to live the rest of his life with what he has done. A distraught Bayley does not use his bus ticket to return home, but instead leaves the bus station to an unknown destination. In Frieda's bunker, Piper proposes to Alex, who says yes. After discovering that the guards have escaped, Taystee attempts to talk to the CERT, but it is too late, as they immediately swarm Litchfield. Flashback: Piper and her then-boyfriend, Larry, get tattoos. She later drunk dials Alex, stating that she is still on her mind and misses her.
65	13	"Storm-y Weather"	Jesse Peretz	Lauren Morelli	none	June 9, 2017
Dozens of CERT members in riot gear break down the prison doors with smoke bombs, stun guns and batons in hand, causing pandemonium as they handcuff all the inmates. After discovering a dead Humphrey, the CERT escalate their tactics to "by any means necessary." Cindy and Taystee panic as Suzanne is unconscious from the lithium. They get help from Nicky, who takes them down to Frieda's hiding place; Suzanne is revived when they inject her with an epi-pen. Angie and Leanne burn all the prison records to erase their history of infractions. Deciding not to go down without a fight, Ouija, Pidge and the white supremacists barricade themselves inside a dorm and injure some of the CERT members with booby traps before being restrained. The inmates are led outside in handcuffs in front of a crowd of families and the press. Maritza and Flaca are thrilled to see fans of their beauty tutorials on the internet cheering for them. Morello reunites with Vince, and Maria is allowed to see her daughter. Linda tries to tell an officer she is from MCC, but she is ignored. The count of the inmates leaves them ten short, and Caputo informs the CERT about the old pool that Figueroa never filled. The CERT chief assumes the fact that the remaining inmates are hiding "strategically" means they are planning an offensive against the officers. He informs Caputo that the governor has already approved any casualties necessary. Pennsatucky and Coates bond in the cabin. Nicky brings Taystee, Cindy and Suzanne to the bunker, and Taystee is shocked to see Piscatella tied up. She takes Frieda's gun and points it at him, telling him he is to blame for Poussey's death. But instead of killing him, she breaks down crying. Red unexpectedly releases Piscatella and tells him to leave without touching anyone. Piscatella emerges into the prison hallway, only to be shot and killed by an inexperienced CERT officer. As night falls, the inmates outside are loaded onto buses for new prisons; Flaca and Maritza are separated. In the bunker, the remaining inmates—Alex, Piper, Taystee, Nicky, Red, Cindy, Frieda, Suzanne, Blanca, and Gloria—link arms as the CERT blows the doors off.

== Production ==
In February 2016, the series was renewed for a fifth, sixth, and seventh season. The fifth season was released on June 9, 2017.

=== Cyberhack ===
In April 2017, it was reported that a cybercriminal had stolen the first ten episodes of the fifth season in a security breach of a post-production company. Netflix failed to respond to ransom demands, and the cybercriminal leaked the episodes online. Netflix confirmed the security breach and an ongoing investigation by federal law enforcement. Multichannel News reported that demand for the series significantly increased over the seven-day period following the leak of the episodes.

== Reception ==
=== Critical reception ===
The fifth season has received "generally favorable" reviews. On Metacritic, it has a score of 67 out of 100 based on 20 reviews. On Rotten Tomatoes, it has a 76% rating with an average score of 7.47 out of 10 based on 33 reviews.
