= 21st Screen Actors Guild Awards =

- Awarded for: Outstanding motion picture and primetime television performances
- Date: January 25, 2015
- Location: Shrine Auditorium; Los Angeles, California
- Country: United States
- Presented by: SAG-AFTRA
- Website: www.sagawards.org

Television/radio coverage
- Network: TNT and TBS simultaneous broadcast

The 21st ceremony of the Screen Actors Guild Awards, awarded by SAG-AFTRA and honoring the best achievements in film and television performances for the year 2014, took place on January 25, 2015, at the Shrine Auditorium in Los Angeles, California. The ceremony was broadcast on both TNT and TBS 8:00 p.m. EST / 5:00 p.m. PST and the nominees were announced on December 10, 2014.

Debbie Reynolds was announced as the 2014 SAG Life Achievement Award honoree on August 18, 2014.

== Winners and nominees ==
Winners are listed first and highlighted in boldface.

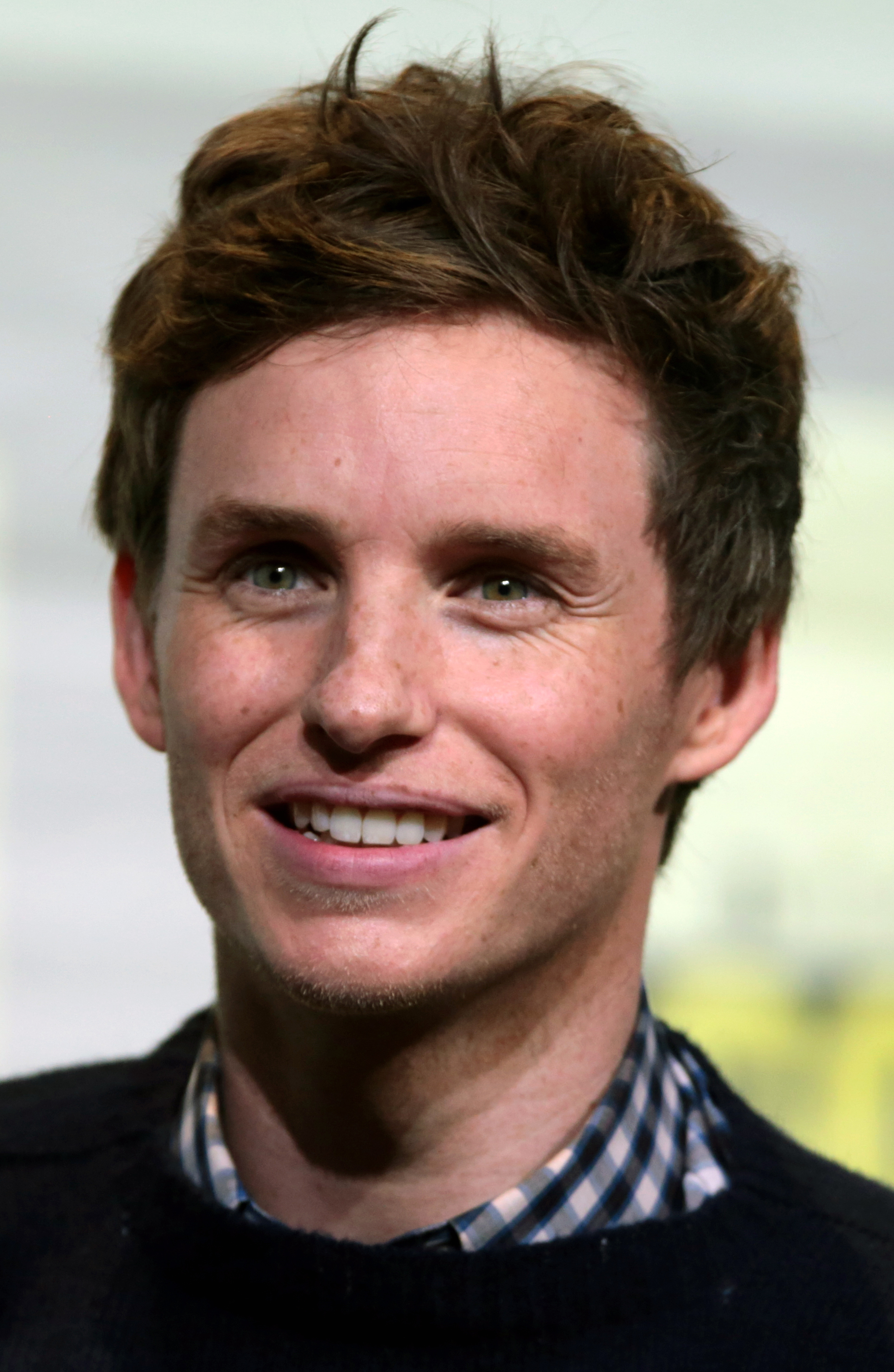
Eddie Redmayne, Outstanding Performance by a Male Actor in a Leading Role winner

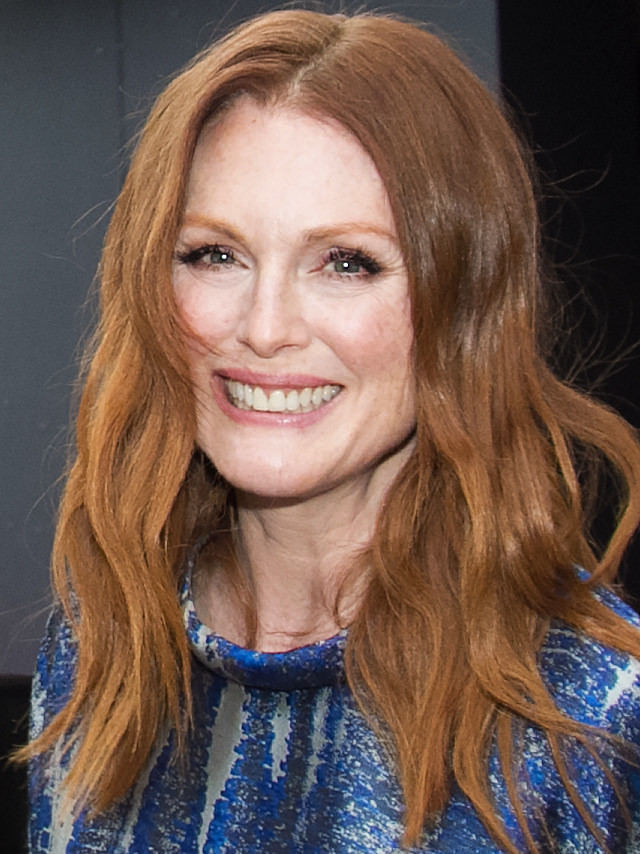
Julianne Moore, Outstanding Performance by a Female Actor in a Leading Role winner

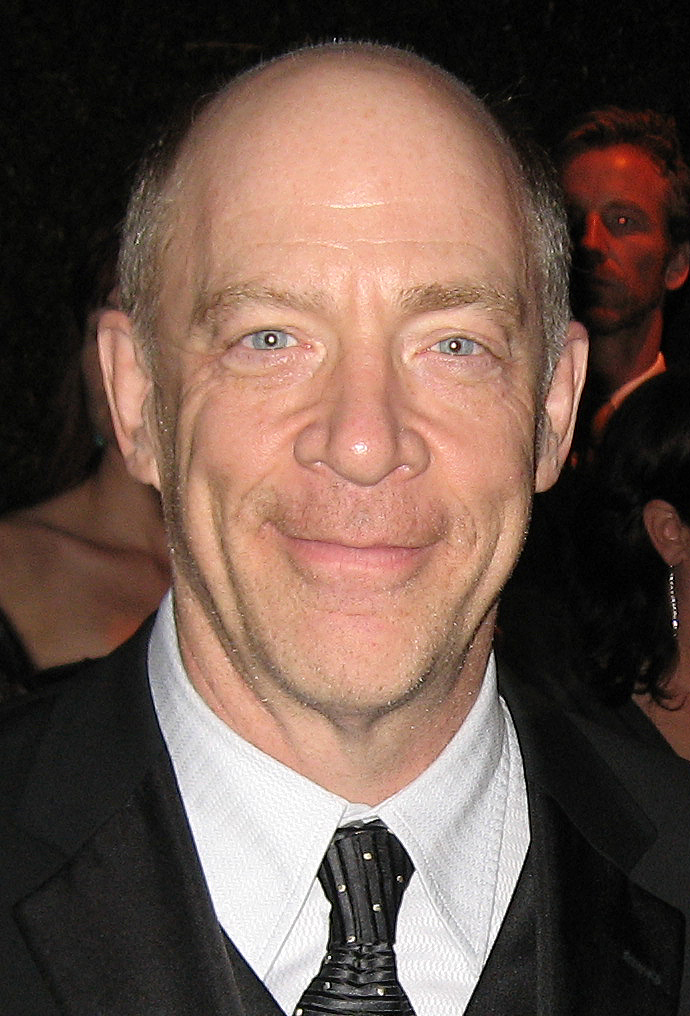
J. K. Simmons, Outstanding Performance by a Male Actor in a Supporting Role winner

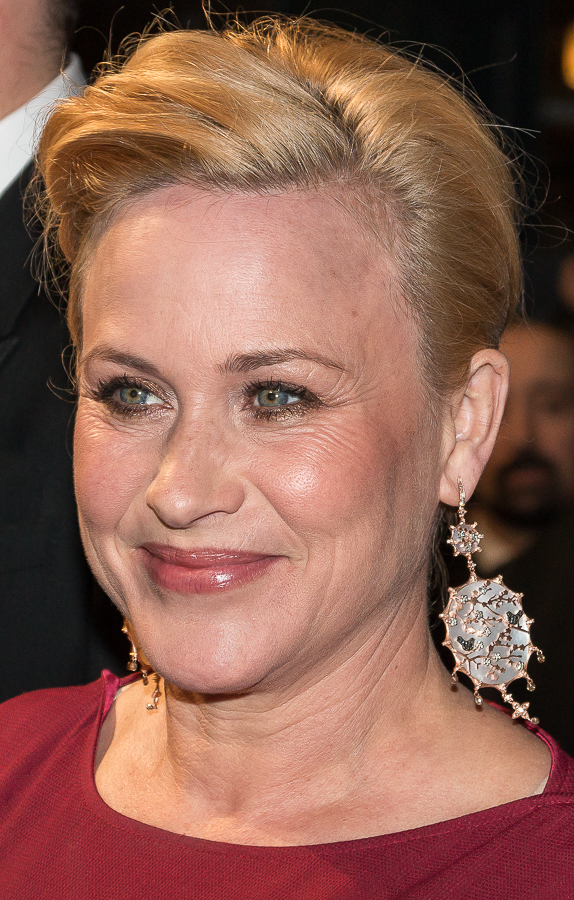
Patricia Arquette, Outstanding Performance by a Female Actor in a Supporting Role winner

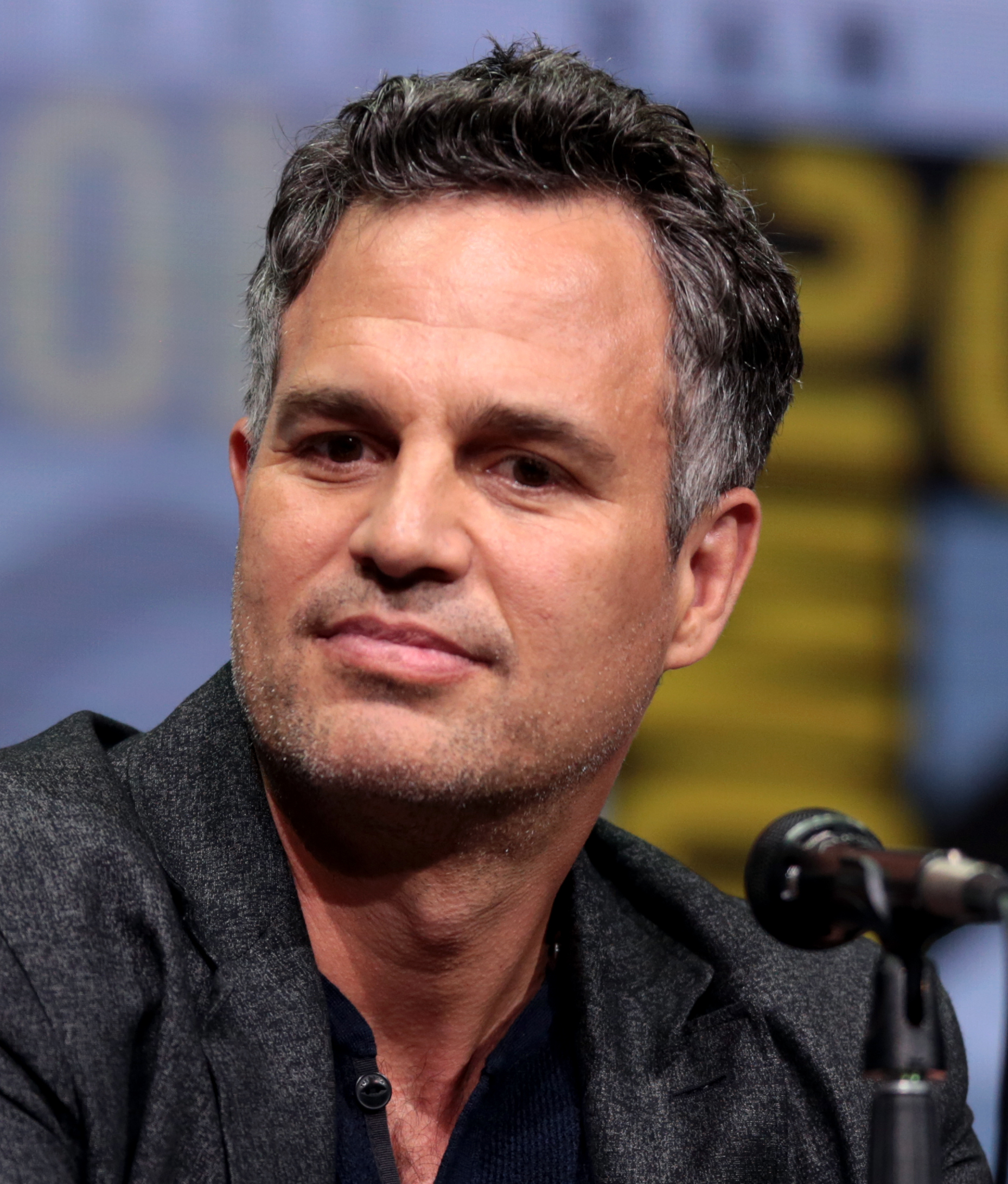
Mark Ruffalo, Outstanding Performance by a Male Actor in a Miniseries or Television Movie winner

Frances McDormand, Outstanding Performance by a Female Actor in a Miniseries or Television Movie winner

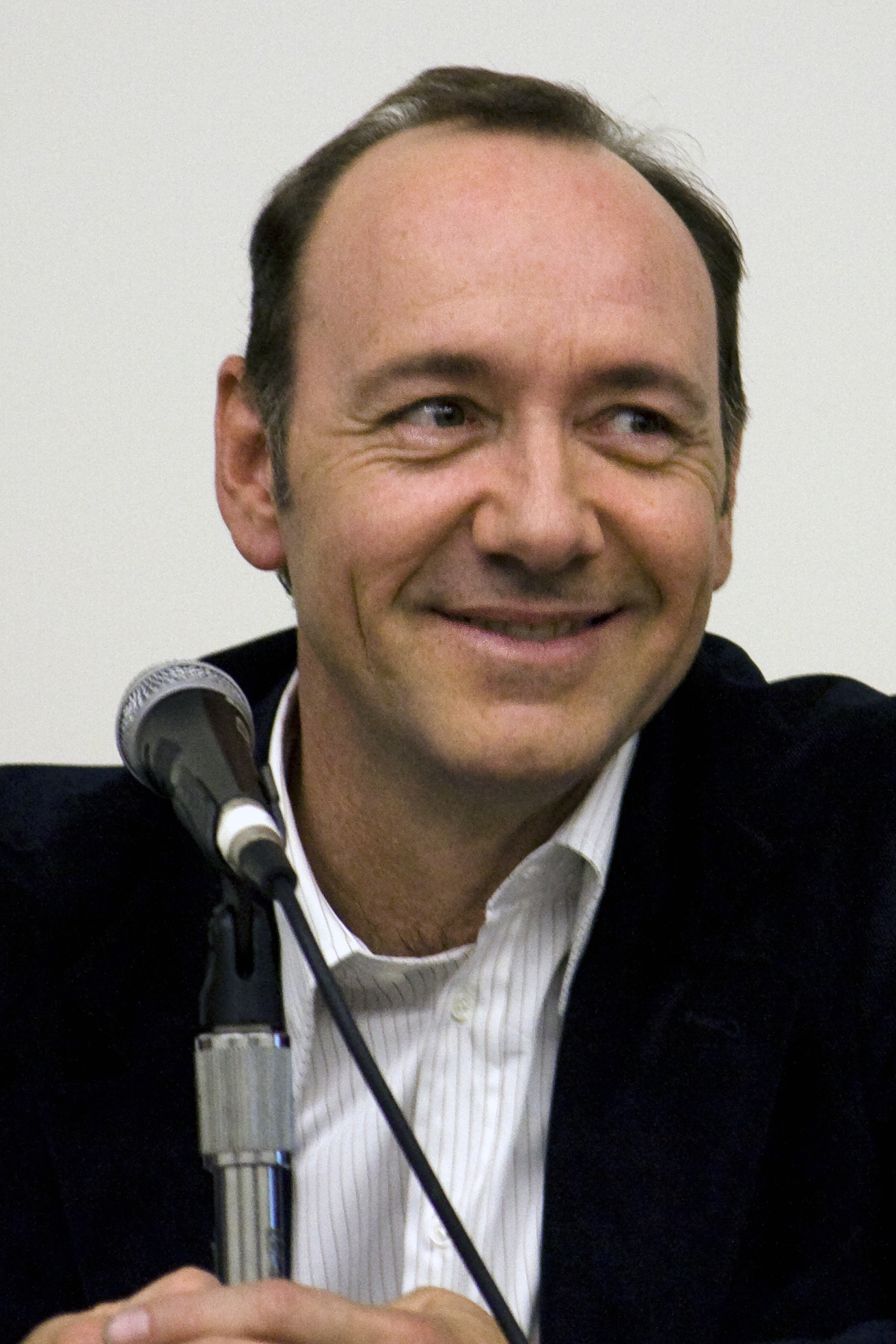
Kevin Spacey, Outstanding Performance by a Male Actor in a Drama Series winner

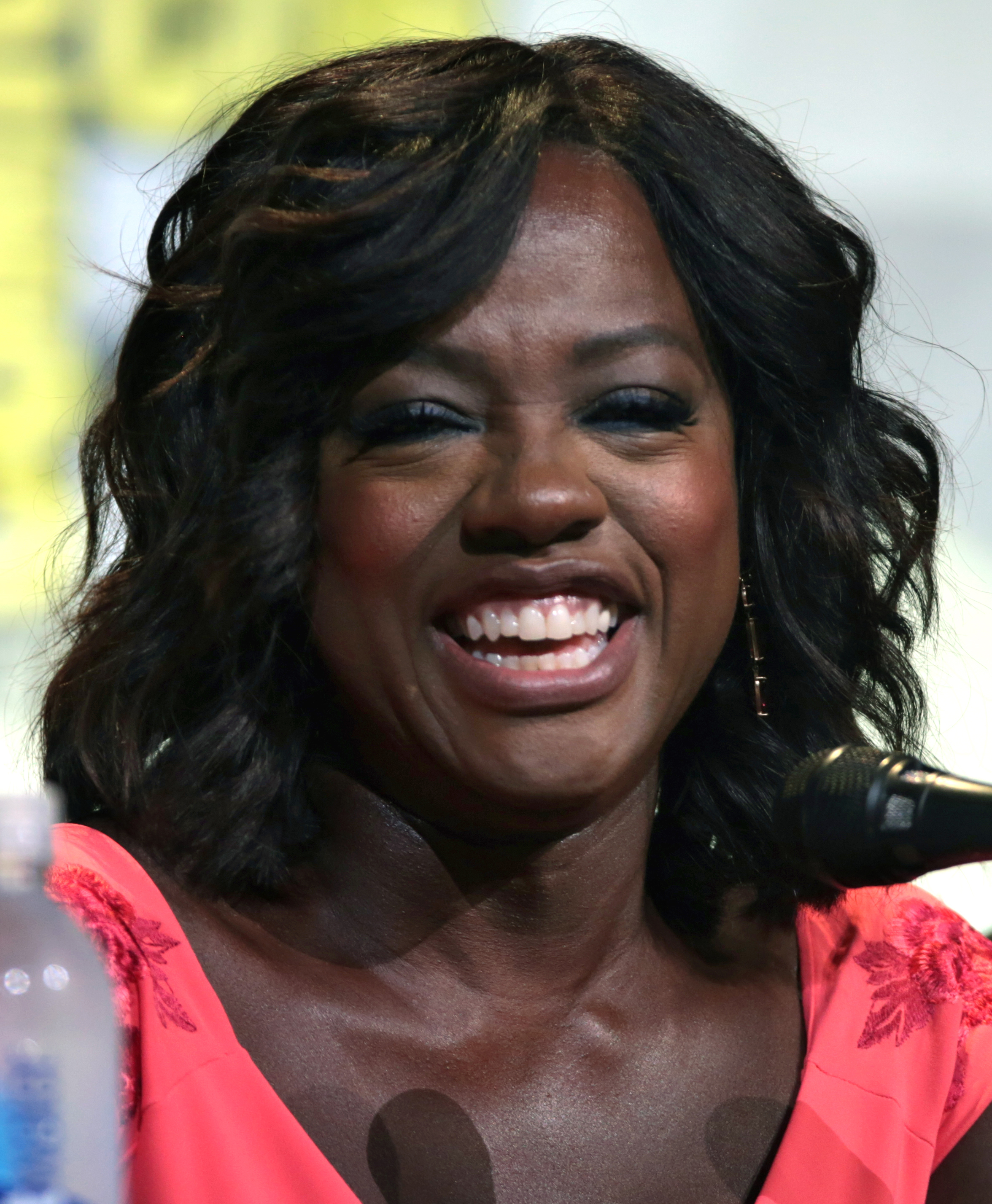
Viola Davis, Outstanding Performance by a Female Actor in a Drama Series winner

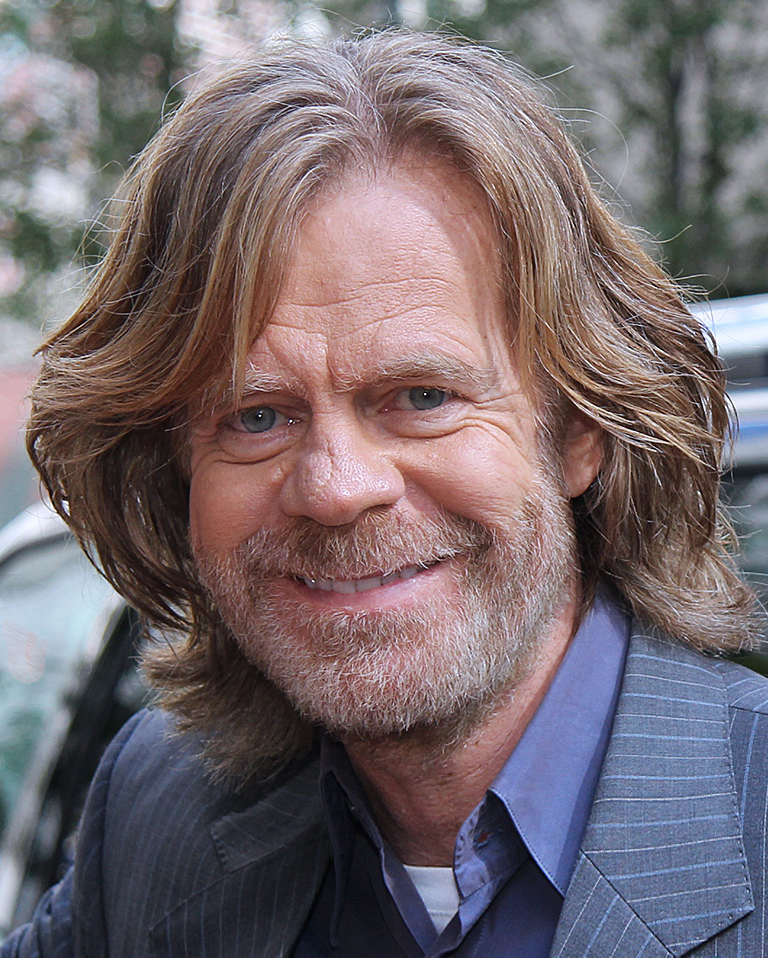
William H. Macy, Outstanding Performance by a Male Actor in a Comedy Series winner

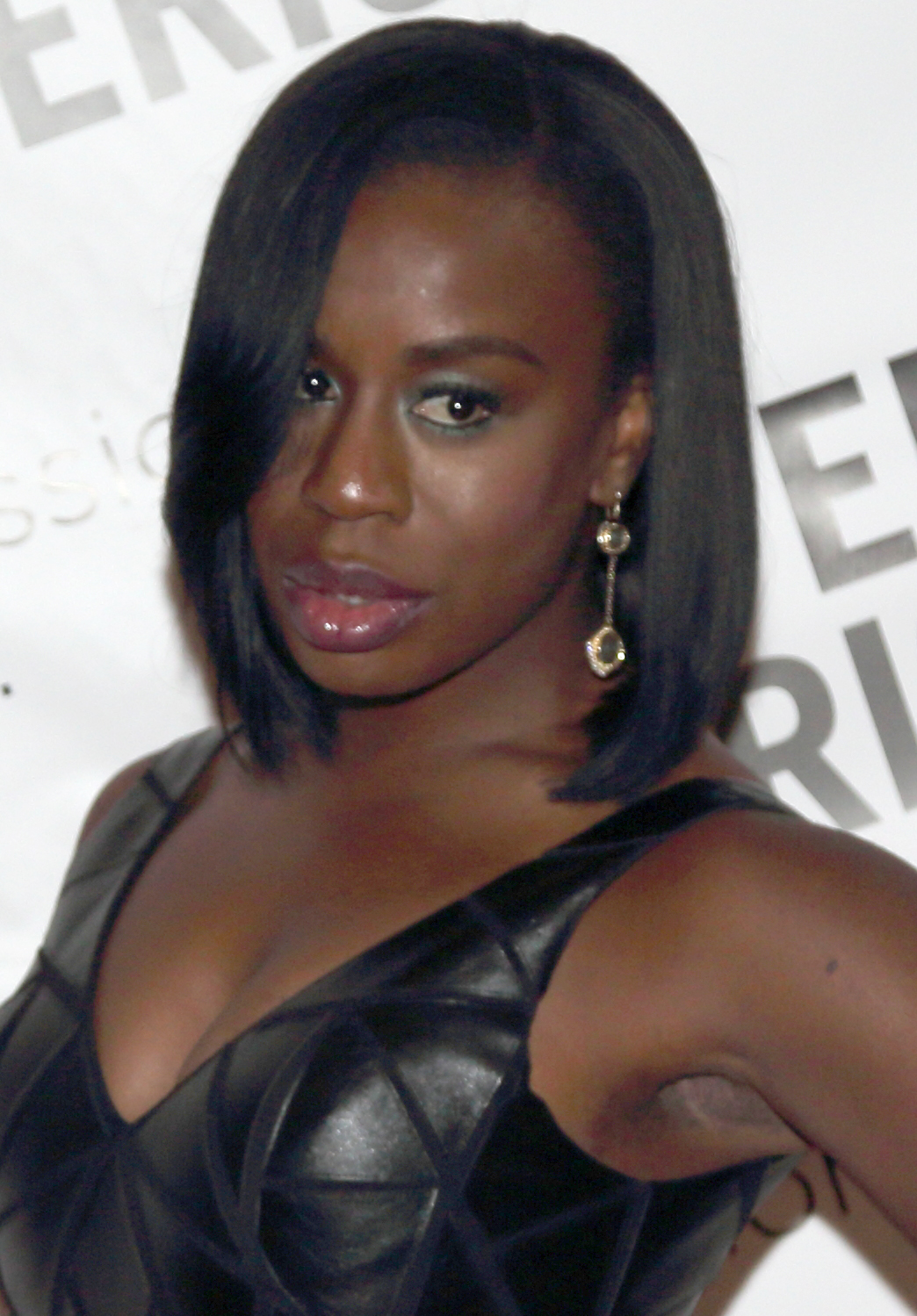
Uzo Aduba, Outstanding Performance by a Female Actor in a Comedy Series winner

=== Film ===
Outstanding Performance by a Male Actor in a Leading Role	Outstanding Performance by a Female Actor in a Leading Role
**Eddie Redmayne – The Theory of Everything as Stephen Hawking**; Steve Carell – Foxcatcher as John du Pont; Benedict Cumberbatch – The Imitation Game as Alan Turing; Jake Gyllenhaal – Nightcrawler as Louis "Lou" Bloom; Michael Keaton – Birdman as Riggan Thomson	**Julianne Moore – Still Alice as Dr. Alice Howland**; Jennifer Aniston – Cake as Claire Bennett; Felicity Jones – The Theory of Everything as Jane Hawking; Rosamund Pike – Gone Girl as Amy Elliott-Dunne; Reese Witherspoon – Wild as Cheryl Strayed
Outstanding Performance by a Male Actor in a Supporting Role	Outstanding Performance by a Female Actor in a Supporting Role
**J. K. Simmons – Whiplash as Terence Fletcher**; Robert Duvall – The Judge as Judge Joseph Palmer; Ethan Hawke – Boyhood as Mason Evans Sr.; Edward Norton – Birdman as Mike Shiner; Mark Ruffalo – Foxcatcher as Dave Schultz	**Patricia Arquette – Boyhood as Olivia Evans**; Keira Knightley – The Imitation Game as Joan Clarke; Emma Stone – Birdman as Sam Thomson; Meryl Streep – Into the Woods as The Witch; Naomi Watts – St. Vincent as Daka Paramova
Outstanding Performance by a Cast in a Motion Picture
**Birdman – Zach Galifianakis, Michael Keaton, Edward Norton, Andrea Riseborough, Amy Ryan, Emma Stone, and Naomi Watts**; Boyhood – Patricia Arquette, Ellar Coltrane, Ethan Hawke, and Lorelei Linklater; The Grand Budapest Hotel – F. Murray Abraham, Mathieu Amalric, Adrien Brody, Willem Dafoe, Ralph Fiennes, Jeff Goldblum, Harvey Keitel, Jude Law, Bill Murray, Edward Norton, Tony Revolori, Saoirse Ronan, Jason Schwartzman, Léa Seydoux, Tilda Swinton, Tom Wilkinson, and Owen Wilson; The Imitation Game – Matthew Beard, Benedict Cumberbatch, Charles Dance, Matthew Goode, Rory Kinnear, Keira Knightley, Allen Leech, and Mark Strong; The Theory of Everything – Charlie Cox, Felicity Jones, Simon McBurney, Eddie Redmayne, David Thewlis, and Emily Watson
Outstanding Performance by a Stunt Ensemble in a Motion Picture
**Unbroken**; Fury; Get on Up; The Hobbit: The Battle of the Five Armies; X-Men: Days of Future Past

=== Television ===
Outstanding Performance by a Male Actor in a Miniseries or Television Movie	Outstanding Performance by a Female Actor in a Miniseries or Television Movie
**Mark Ruffalo – The Normal Heart (HBO) as Ned Weeks**; Adrien Brody – Houdini (History) as Harry Houdini; Benedict Cumberbatch – Sherlock: His Last Vow (PBS) as Sherlock Holmes; Richard Jenkins – Olive Kitteridge (HBO) as Henry Kitteridge; Billy Bob Thornton – Fargo (FX) as Lorne Malvo	**Frances McDormand – Olive Kitteridge (HBO) as Olive Kitteridge**; Ellen Burstyn – Flowers in the Attic (Lifetime) as Olivia Foxworth; Maggie Gyllenhaal – The Honourable Woman (Sundance TV) as Nessa Stein, Baroness Stein of Tilbury; Julia Roberts – The Normal Heart (HBO) as Dr. Emma Brookner; Cicely Tyson – The Trip to Bountiful (Lifetime) as Mrs. Carrie Watts
Outstanding Performance by a Male Actor in a Drama Series	Outstanding Performance by a Female Actor in a Drama Series
**Kevin Spacey – House of Cards (Netflix) as Francis Underwood**; Steve Buscemi – Boardwalk Empire (HBO) as Nucky Thompson; Peter Dinklage – Game of Thrones (HBO) as Tyrion Lannister; Woody Harrelson – True Detective (HBO) as Martin Hart; Matthew McConaughey – True Detective (HBO) as Rust Cohle	**Viola Davis – How to Get Away with Murder (ABC) as Annalise Keating**; Claire Danes – Homeland (Showtime) as Carrie Mathison; Julianna Margulies – The Good Wife (CBS) as Alicia Florrick; Tatiana Maslany – Orphan Black (BBC America) as Various; Maggie Smith – Downton Abbey (PBS) as Violet, Dowager Countess of Grantham; Robin Wright – House of Cards (Netflix) as Claire Underwood
Outstanding Performance by a Male Actor in a Comedy Series	Outstanding Performance by a Female Actor in a Comedy Series
**William H. Macy – Shameless (Showtime) as Frank Gallagher**; Ty Burrell – Modern Family (ABC) as Phil Dunphy; Louis C.K. – Louie (FX) as Louie; Jim Parsons – The Big Bang Theory (CBS) as Dr. Sheldon Cooper; Eric Stonestreet – Modern Family (ABC) as Cameron Tucker	**Uzo Aduba – Orange Is the New Black (Netflix) as Suzanne "Crazy Eyes" Warren**; Julie Bowen – Modern Family (ABC) as Claire Dunphy; Edie Falco – Nurse Jackie (Showtime) as Jackie Peyton; Julia Louis-Dreyfus – Veep (HBO) as Selina Meyer; Amy Poehler – Parks and Recreation (NBC) as Leslie Knope
Outstanding Performance by an Ensemble in a Drama Series
**Downton Abbey (PBS) – Hugh Bonneville, Laura Carmichael, Jim Carter, Brendan Coyle, Michelle Dockery, Kevin Doyle, Joanne Froggatt, Lily James, Rob James-Collier, Allen Leech, Phyllis Logan, Elizabeth McGovern, Sophie McShera, Matt Milne, Lesley Nicol, David Robb, Maggie Smith, Ed Speleers, Cara Theobold and Penelope Wilton**; Boardwalk Empire (HBO) – Steve Buscemi, Paul Calderón, Nicholas Calhoun, Louis Cancelmi, John Ellison Conlee, Michael Countryman, Stephen Graham, Domenick Lombardozzi, Nolan Lyons, Kelly Macdonald, Boris McGiver, Vincent Piazza, Paul Sparks, Travis Tope, Shea Whigham, Anatol Yusef and Michael Zegen; Game of Thrones (HBO) – Josef Altin, Jacob Anderson, John Bradley-West, Gwendoline Christie, Emilia Clarke, Nikolaj Coster-Waldau, Ben Crompton, Charles Dance, Peter Dinklage, Natalie Dormer, Nathalie Emmanuel, Iain Glen, Julian Glover, Kit Harington, Lena Headey, Conleth Hill, Rory McCann, Ian McElhinney, Pedro Pascal, Daniel Portman, Sophie Turner and Maisie Williams; Homeland (Showtime) – Numan Acar, Nazanin Boniadi, Claire Danes, Rupert Friend, Raza Jaffrey, Nimrat Kaur, Tracy Letts, Mark Moses, Michael O'Keefe, Mandy Patinkin, Laila Robins and Maury Sterling; House of Cards (Netflix) – Mahershala Ali, Jayne Atkinson, Rachel Brosnahan, Derek Cecil, Nathan Darrow, Michel Gill, Joanna Going, Sakina Jaffrey, Michael Kelly, Mozhan Marnò, Gerald McRaney, Molly Parker, Jimmi Simpson, Kevin Spacey and Robin Wright
Outstanding Performance by an Ensemble in a Comedy Series
**Orange Is the New Black (Netflix) – Uzo Aduba, Jason Biggs, Danielle Brooks, Laverne Cox, Jackie Cruz, Catherine Curtin, Lea Delaria, Beth Fowler, Yvette Freeman, Germar Terrell Gardner, Kimiko Glenn, Annie Golden, Diane Guerrero, Michael J. Harney, Vicky Jeudy, Julie Lake, Lauren Lapkus, Selenis Leyva, Natasha Lyonne, Taryn Manning, Joel Marsh Garland, Matt McGorry, Adrienne C. Moore, Kate Mulgrew, Emma Myles, Jessica Pimentel, Dascha Polanco, Alysia Reiner, Judith Roberts, Elizabeth Rodriguez, Barbara Rosenblat, Nick Sandow, Abigail Savage, Taylor Schilling, Constance Shulman, Dale Soules, Yael Stone, Lorraine Toussaint, Lin Tucci and Samira Wiley**; The Big Bang Theory (CBS) – Mayim Bialik, Kaley Cuoco, Johnny Galecki, Simon Helberg, Kunal Nayyar, Jim Parsons and Melissa Rauch; Brooklyn Nine-Nine (Fox) – Stephanie Beatriz, Andre Braugher, Terry Crews, Melissa Fumero, Joe Lo Truglio, Chelsea Peretti and Andy Samberg; Modern Family (ABC) – Aubrey Anderson-Emmons, Julie Bowen, Ty Burrell, Jesse Tyler Ferguson, Nolan Gould, Sarah Hyland, Ed O'Neill, Rico Rodriguez, Eric Stonestreet, Sofía Vergara and Ariel Winter; Veep (HBO) – Sufe Bradshaw, Anna Chlumsky, Gary Cole, Kevin Dunn, Tony Hale, Julia Louis-Dreyfus, Reid Scott, Timothy Simons and Matt Walsh
Outstanding Performance by a Stunt Ensemble in a Television Series
**Game of Thrones (HBO)**; 24: Live Another Day (Fox); Boardwalk Empire (HBO); Homeland (Showtime); Sons of Anarchy (FX); The Walking Dead (AMC)

=== Screen Actors Guild Life Achievement Award ===
- Debbie Reynolds

== Multiple nominations ==
=== Film ===
Nominations	Film
4	Birdman
3	Boyhood
3	The Imitation Game
3	The Theory of Everything
2	Foxcatcher

=== Television ===
Nominations	Program
4	Modern Family
3	Boardwalk Empire
3	Game of Thrones
3	Homeland
3	House of Cards
2	The Big Bang Theory
2	Downton Abbey
2	The Normal Heart
2	Olive Kitteridge
2	Orange Is the New Black
2	True Detective
2	Veep

== Multiple wins ==
=== Television ===
Wins	Program
2	Orange Is the New Black

== In Memoriam ==
Liev Schreiber introduced the "In Memoriam" segment to pay tribute to the actors who have died in 2014:

- Mickey Rooney
- James Rebhorn
- Ann B. Davis
- Ruby Dee
- Misty Upham
- Richard Kiel
- Lauren Bacall
- Maximilian Schell
- Harold Ramis
- Casey Kasem
- Sumi Haru
- Elaine Stritch
- James Shigeta
- Bob Hoskins
- Sid Caesar
- Eli Wallach
- Russell Johnson
- Ralph Waite
- Polly Bergen
- Richard Attenborough
- Don Pardo
- Sheila MacRae
- James Garner
- Marcia Strassman
- Marian Seldes
- Ed Nelson
- Phyllis Frelich
- Mary Ann Mobley
- Meshach Taylor
- Elizabeth Peña
- Shirley Temple
- Geoffrey Holder
- Luise Rainer
- Edward Herrmann
- Billie Whitelaw
- Joan Rivers
- Efrem Zimbalist, Jr.
- David Brenner
- Jan Hooks
- Philip Seymour Hoffman
- Robin Williams

== See also ==
- 4th AACTA International Awards
- 67th Primetime Emmy Awards
- 72nd Golden Globe Awards
- 87th Academy Awards
