= Power suit =

Power suit may refer to:

- Powered exoskeleton, a wearable mobile machine
- Power dressing, a fashion style for the business environment
- "Power Suit" (Orange Is the New Black), a 2016 television episode
- The armor worn by Captain Power and the Soldiers of the Future in the 1980s TV series of the same name
- The armored suit worn by Samus Aran in the Metroid video game series
