= In the Country We Love =

2016 memoir by Diane Guerrero

- Author: Diane Guerrero
- Genre: Memoir
- Publisher: 2016 (St. Martin's Griffin)
- Publication place: United States
- ISBN: 978-1-250-13496-7

In the Country We Love is a memoir by American actress Diane Guerrero. The book, first published in 2016, follows Guerrero's upbringing in Boston, Massachusetts, where she was raised by two parents who were undocumented immigrants from Colombia. At the age of 14, upon arriving home from school, Guerrero discovered that her parents and older brother had been detained and were eventually deported back to Colombia. Guerrero, who was born in the United States and is an American citizen, stayed in Boston to finish high school, living with various friends and relatives.

Written in collaboration with Michelle Burford, the book details Guerrero's childhood, living in fear of immigration (ICE) officials and the impact it had on her teenage years and early adulthood, as well as her struggle and determination to become an actress.

Since the publication of In the Country We Love, Guerrero has become an immigration advocate, and in 2016, was named a Presidential Ambassador for Citizenship and Naturalization by the Obama administration.

In 2018, Guerrero published My Family Divided, an adaptation of In the Country We Love aimed towards children and teenagers facing similar familial circumstances.
