= Happy Yummy Chicken =

- Film poster
- Directed by: Anna Lloyd Bradshaw
- Screenplay by: Brandon Monokian
- Produced by: Aden Hakimi; Julie Fain Lawrence; Taryn Manning
- Starring: Taryn Manning; Suzzanne Douglas; Emma Myles; Diane Guerrero; Brandon Monokian; Erik Ransom; Ashley Biel; Elaine Bromka; Julie Fain Lawrence; Jessica Romano; Megan Greener; Noam Ash
- Cinematography: Nicolas J. Capra
- Edited by: Aden Hakimi
- Music by: Andy Peterson; Erik Jareth Ransom
- Production companies: Love Drunk Life; Silver Crown Entertainment
- Release date: June 5, 2016 (Hoboken)
- Running time: 83 minutes
- Country: United States
- Language: English

Happy Yummy Chicken is a 2016 American musical comedy film directed by Anna Lloyd Bradshaw and starring Taryn Manning, Suzzanne Douglas, Emma Myles and Diane Guerrero.

The film premiered at the 2016 Hoboken International Film Festival.

== Cast ==
- Taryn Manning as Laura Splinterschloss
- Diane Guerrero as Cheryl Davis
- Suzzanne Douglas as Sarah Del Casserole
- Emma Myles as Geraldine Spruce
- Brandon Monokian as Brody McMillin
- Erik Ransom as Matthew Mansfield
- Ashley Biel as Marilyn Spalding
- Elaine Bromka as Jenny
- Julie Fain Lawrence as Lillian Landslide Thomas
- Jessica Romano as Bonnie Alissa
- Megan Greener as Mary Sue Harding
- Noam Ash as Frank
