= Elaine Bromka =

American actress

- Born: January 6, 1950 (age 76); Montclair, New Jersey, U.S.
- Occupation: Actress
- Years active: 1980–present

Elaine Bromka (born January 6, 1950) is an American actress. She is known for cowriting the one-woman play Lady Bird, Pat & Betty: Tea for Three with Eric H. Weinberger, in which Bromka portrayed First Ladies Lady Bird Johnson, Pat Nixon and Betty Ford. She is also known in film for playing Cindy Russell in Uncle Buck (1989). Bromka also played Gloria in the 2011 film In the Family. She played April in Eleanor the Great.

She has also appeared on television shows including Days of Our Lives, The Sopranos, Sex and the City, And Just Like That, ER, Flatbush Misdemeanors, and Girls.

On stage, she has appeared in such Broadway in such productions as The Rose Tattoo, I'm Not Rappaport and Macbeth. Bromka won a New England Emmy Award for her work in the television special Catch a Rainbow.

Bromka is from Montclair, New Jersey.

== Select filmography ==
- Without a Trace (1983)
- Uncle Buck (1989)
- In the Family (2011)
- Archaeology of a Woman (2012)
- Theresa Is a Mother (2012)
- Happy Yummy Chicken (2016)
