= Diane Guerrero =

American actress and singer

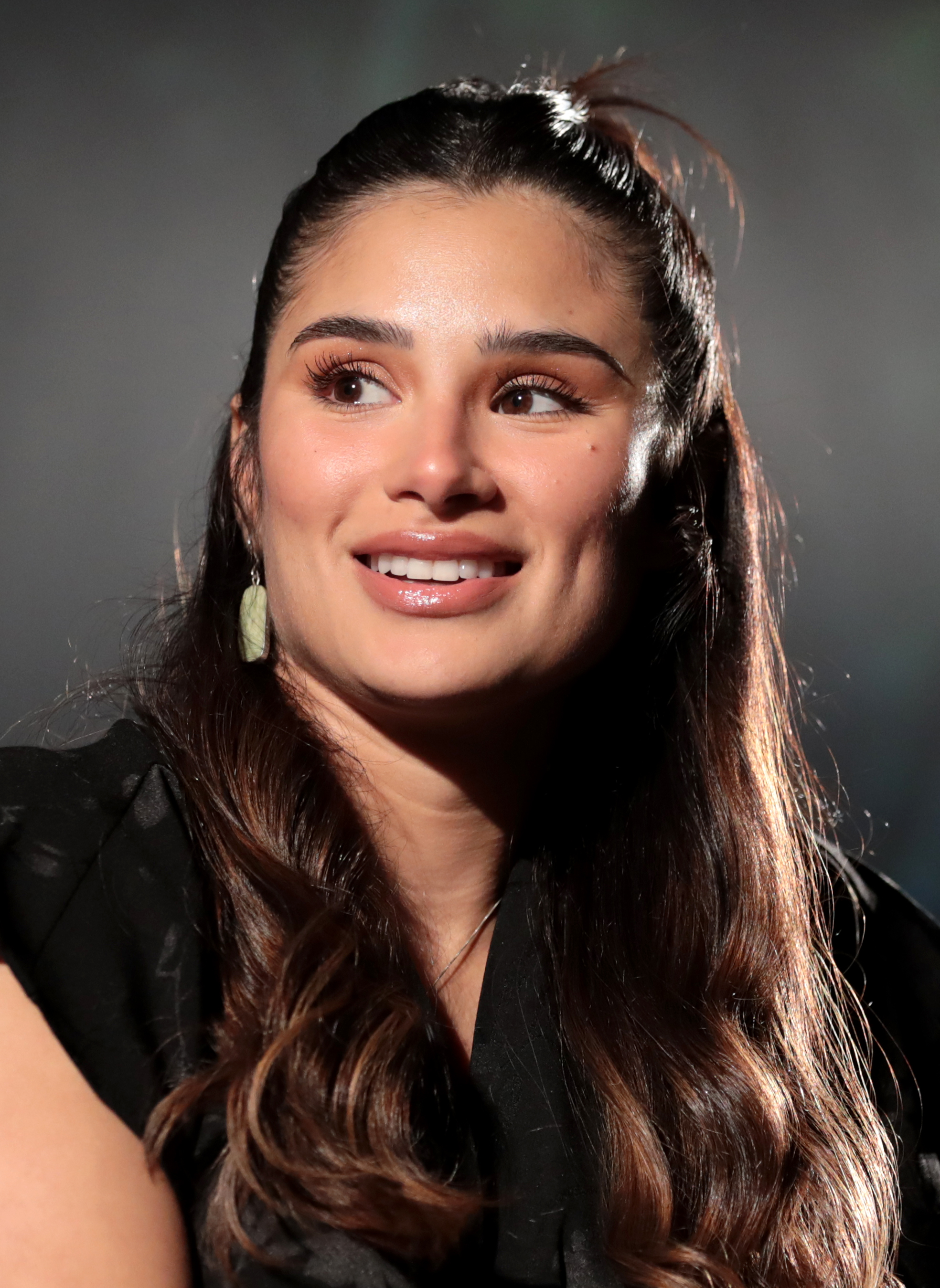
- Guerrero in 2023
- Born: July 21, 1986 (age 40); Passaic, New Jersey, U.S.
- Education: Regis College (BA)
- Occupations: Actress, singer
- Years active: 2010–present
- Known for: Orange Is the New Black; Jane the Virgin; Doom Patrol; Encanto

Diane Guerrero (born July 21, 1986) is an American actress and singer. She is known for her roles as inmate Maritza Ramos in the Netflix series Orange Is the New Black and Lina on Jane the Virgin. Her role on Orange Is the New Black has contributed to three consecutive wins for the Screen Actors Guild Award for Outstanding Performance by an Ensemble in a Comedy Series. Guerrero is the author of In the Country We Love: My Family Divided, a memoir about her parents being detained and deported when she was fourteen. She starred as Kay Challis / Crazy Jane in the Max action-drama series Doom Patrol. She also voiced characters such as Jessica Cruz / Green Lantern in Justice League vs. the Fatal Five and Isabela Madrigal in the 2021 Disney film Encanto.

== Early life and education ==
Guerrero was born on July 21, 1986 in Passaic, New Jersey. She has an older maternal half-brother (born 1976). Her parents and brother emigrated from Palmira, Colombia in 1981 and settled in Boston, Massachusetts in 1987.

As the only member of her immediate family with American citizenship, Guerrero remained in the U.S. at the age of fourteen when her parents and older brother were deported back to Colombia after unsuccessfully pursuing legal citizenship. She emphasized that even though she was a minor, no government agency reached out to see if she was okay after this occurred. She relied solely on her friends' parents to help get her through the rest of high school and beyond. Guerrero has since become a strong advocate for immigration reform.

Guerrero was raised in the Jamaica Plain and Roxbury neighborhoods of Boston after being taken in by other Colombian families. She attended Boston Arts Academy, a performing arts high school, where she was in the music department. Among her high school activities was singing with a jazz group, but she anticipated pursuing political science and communications in college. She then studied political science and communications at Regis College, studying abroad at Regent's University London during her junior year. Her first job after college was in a law office.

In 2010, at age twenty-four, Guerrero decided to pursue a career in acting. That same year, she appeared in the music video for Boston-based R&B singer Louie Bello's song "Faces". In 2011, she moved to New York City and studied acting at the Susan Batson Studios, where she met her manager Josh Taylor.

== Career ==
In 2012, Guerrero was cast in Orange is the New Black in the role of Maritza Ramos, a Bronx-bred character with Colombian roots. For season 2, she was part of the cast that earned recognition for Outstanding Performance by an Ensemble in a Comedy Series at the 21st Screen Actors Guild Awards. The cast earned recognition for Outstanding Performance by an Ensemble in a Comedy Series again at the 22nd Screen Actors Guild Awards and 23rd Screen Actors Guild Awards. She remained part of the show through season 5. She returned for the final season in 2019.

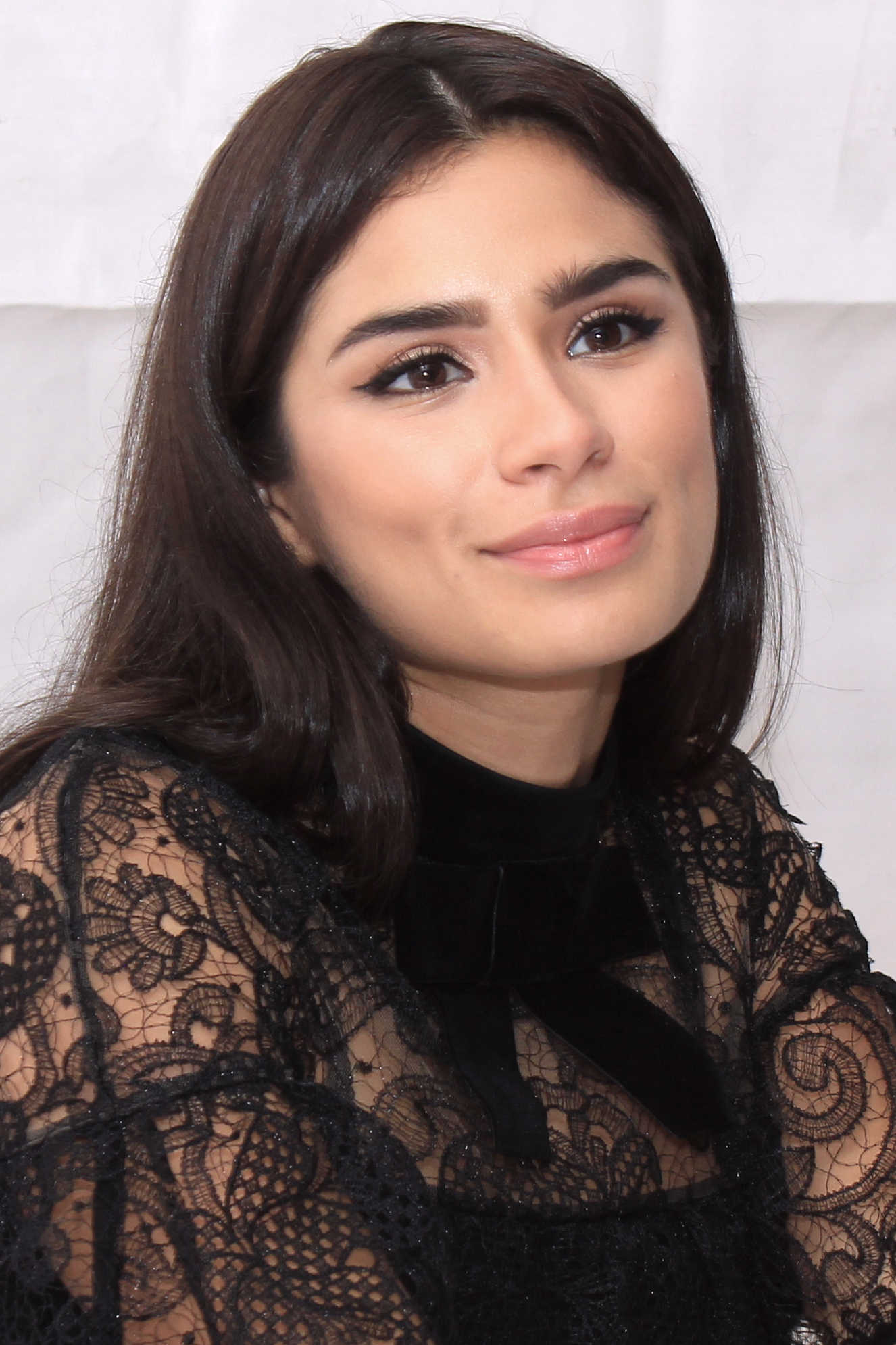
Guerrero at the 2016 Texas Book Festival.

In 2014, Guerrero was cast in a recurring role on The CW series Jane the Virgin. In February 2015, Guerrero was cast as the female lead in CBS' television pilot for Super Clyde, but the show was not picked up for series. In 2017, Guerrero was cast in a regular role for season 2 of Superior Donuts. Guerrero has appeared in the films Emoticon ;), Peter and John, and Happy Yummy Chicken. In 2018, she appeared in the films Beyond Control and The Godmother.

In 2016, Guerrero released In the Country We Love: My Family Divided, a memoir about her parents being detained and deported when she was 14. The book was written with Michelle Burford and published by Henry Holt and Co. A drama based on her memoir was picked up by CBS, to be developed into a drama executive produced by Jennie Snyder Urman, Ben Silverman, and Paul Sciarrotta, with Snyder attached as the showrunner. Guerrero was initially set to play the lead. In 2017, CBS decided to pass on the project, but was picked up by Fox. As of January 2018, no pilot for the series has been ordered.

Following the release of In the Country We Love: My Family Divided, Guerrero also released My Family Divided, a memoir similar to her previous work but for younger children. One of the main reasons she wanted to cater this book to a younger audience is because she felt like kids who were in similar situations as her own had no knowledge on how to deal with it. In an interview with The Washington Post, she says "I never read anything close to my story. I had no reference point. I felt really alone."

In July 2018, Guerrero joined the cast of the DC Universe series Doom Patrol as Jane. The series debuted in 2019. She is the first actress to play Crazy Jane onscreen.

Guerrero hosted the first two seasons of the Hello Sunshine podcast, How It Is.

Guerrero provided the voice of Isabela Madrigal in the Disney animated film Encanto, which premiered November 24, 2021.

== Awards ==
In 2018, Guerrero was awarded the "Lupe Ontiveros Indomitable Spirit Award" by the National Hispanic Media Coalition for her commitment to advocacy and increasing the visibility of the Latino community’s achievements and contributions in the USA.

== Advocacy ==
After publicly speaking about her immigrant parents in an article for the Los Angeles Times, Guerrero became an advocate for the immigrant community. She volunteers and is an ambassador for the Immigration Legal Resource Center, a nonprofit organization, that aims to educate people about issues in the immigrant community. She also became a board member for Mi Familia Vota, a national nonprofit organization that seeks to engage communities for social justice.

In September 2015, she was named one of the Presidential Ambassadors for Citizenship and Naturalization by Barack Obama. On May 24, 2018, she was recognized at the 2018 Phillip Burton Immigration & Civil Rights Awards for the work she continues to do.

== Filmography ==
=== Film ===
Year	Title	Role	Notes
2010	Two in the morning	Vampire Girl	Music Video (Beneath The Sheets)
2011	Detour	Angela	Short film
2011	Ashley/Amber	Ashley	Short film
2011	Festivalo	Ivan Model 2	
2012	Open Vacancy	Tatiana	
2012	Saved by the Pole	Princess	Short film
2014	Emot.icon ;)	Amanda Nevins	
2014	My Man Is a Loser	Malea	
2015	Love Comes Later		Short film
2015	Peter and John	Lucia	
2016	Happy Yummy Chicken	Cheryl Davis	
2019	Justice League vs. the Fatal Five	Jessica Cruz / Green Lantern (voice)	Direct-to-video
2019	Killerman	Lola	
2020	Blast Beat	Nelly Andres	
2021	Encanto	Isabela Madrigal (voice)	
2026	The Whistler	Nicole	

=== Television ===
Year	Title	Role	Notes
2011	Body of Proof	Sara Gonzales	Episode: "Buried Secrets"
2012	Are We There Yet?	Stacey	1 episode
2013–2017, 2019	Orange Is the New Black	Maritza Ramos	Recurring role, 57 episodes
2013	Blue Bloods	Carmen	Episode: "This Way Out"
2013	Person of Interest	Ashley	Episode: "Liberty"
2014	Taxi Brooklyn	Carmen Lopez	Episode: "1.2"
2014–2019	Jane the Virgin	Lina Santillan	Recurring role, 24 episodes
2015	Dora and Friends: Into the City!	Pinenut, Fairies (voice)	Episode: "S'more Camping"
2017–2018	Superior Donuts	Sofia	Main role (season 2)
2018–2019	Elena of Avalor	Vestia (voice)	6 episodes
2019–2020	Harvey Girls Forever!	Juanita Tennasynn (voice)	3 episodes
2019–2023	Doom Patrol	Kay Challis / Crazy Jane	Main role, 46 episodes
2020	Legends of Tomorrow	Kay Challis / Crazy Jane	Episode: "Crisis on Infinite Earths, Part 5" (archive footage)
2020	The Eric Andre Show	Herself	Episode: "Lizzo Up"
TBA	Myron Bolitar	Esperanza Diaz	Main Role, upcoming series

=== Video games ===
Year	Title	Role	Notes
2026	Disney Speedstorm	Isabela Madrigal (voice)	

=== Miscellaneous work ===
Year	Title	Role	Notes
2027	Antonio's Fiesta de Encanto	Isabela Madrigal (voice)	Disney's Animal Kingdom attraction

== Discography ==
=== Charted songs ===
List of charted songs, with year released, selected chart positions, and album name shown
Title	Year	Peak chart positions										Certifications	Album
Title	Year	US	AUS	CAN	GER	IRE	NLD	NZ	SWE	UK	WW	Certifications	Album
"We Don't Talk About Bruno" (with Carolina Gaitán, Mauro Castillo, Adassa, Rhenzy Feliz, and Stephanie Beatriz)	2021	1	5	3	71	1	41	4	40	1	1	RIAA: 2× Platinum; ARIA: Platinum; BPI: 2× Platinum; MC: Gold	Encanto
"What Else Can I Do?" (redirect to another page) (with Stephanie Beatriz)	2021	27	63	41	—	34	—	— (Note: "What Else Can I Do?" did not enter the NZ Top 40 Singles Chart, but peaked at number nine on the NZ Hot Singles Chart.)	—	29	34	RIAA: Gold; BPI: Silver	Encanto
"—" denotes songs which were not released in that country or did not chart.

== Awards and nominations ==
Award	Year	Category	Work	Result
Critics' Choice Super Awards	2021	Best Actress in a Superhero Series	Doom Patrol	Nominated
Imagen Awards	2019	Best Actress – Television	Doom Patrol	Nominated
Screen Actors Guild Awards	2015	Outstanding Performance by an Ensemble in a Comedy Series	Orange Is the New Black	Won
Screen Actors Guild Awards	2016	Outstanding Performance by an Ensemble in a Comedy Series	Orange Is the New Black	Won
Screen Actors Guild Awards	2017	Outstanding Performance by an Ensemble in a Comedy Series	Orange Is the New Black	Won
Screen Actors Guild Awards	2018	Outstanding Performance by an Ensemble in a Comedy Series	Orange Is the New Black	Nominated
