= Julie Lake =

American actress

- Born: Palo Alto, California, United States
- Occupation: Actress

Julie Lake is an American actress, best known for playing inmate Angie Rice on Orange is the New Black, for which she is a two-time winner of the Screen Actors Guild Award for Outstanding Performance by an Ensemble in a Comedy Series.

== Early life and education ==
A native of Palo Alto, California, Lake attended Yale University, where she majored in theater.

== Career ==
Lake acted in theatrical plays in New York City for several years, including with Nick Jones. When Jones was hired to be a writer for Orange is the New Black, Jones suggested that Lake audition for the part of Angie Rice. Lake auditioned, and she got the part.

Lake and Shirin Najafi created a web series called George and Julie, which is about a struggling actress in Hollywood who seeks advice from her cat George who degrades her. Lake and Najafi also created a web series called Mental, which is about two friends and their anxiety and mental instability.

== Personal life ==
Lake is married to Jeff Cahn and in 2019 she gave birth to a son. When she was asked to do a make-out scene on Orange Is the New Black, the producers asked her if she had someone in mind for the part, and her husband was brought in for the role.

== Filmography ==
=== Film ===
Year	Title	Role	Notes
2013	Farah Goes Bang	Campaigner	

=== Television ===
Year	Title	Role	Notes
2013–2019	Orange Is the New Black	Angie Rice	48 episodes
2016	Tinderellas	Nicole Richmond	Episode: "Pilot"
2016	Boomtown	Miss Mildred / Jane Fonda	4 episodes
2016–2017	Mental	Julie	5 episodes
2017	Tall Tales	Lisa	Episode: "The Tale of the New Hire"
2017	Love Me Do	Babah Gah	Television film
2018	James Blondes	Jungle Doll	Episode: "Blondes in the Jungle"
2020	Trophies	Tiffany	Television film
2020	Backsliders	Podcast Host	Episode: "Backsliders"
2021	Dale's House	Nilly	Episode: "Pilot"
