= Emma Myles =

American actress

- Myles in 2026
- Occupation: Actress
- Years active: 2006–present
- Notable work: Orange Is the New Black

Emma Myles is an American actress best known for her recurring role as Leanne Taylor on the Netflix original series Orange Is the New Black. She was friends with fellow actress Dascha Polanco before being cast on the show, having met her after they both auditioned for a guest role on Law & Order: Special Victims Unit.

== Filmography ==
=== Film ===
Year	Title	Role
2007	First Born	Katelyn
2008	The Beverages	Steve's Annoyed Liaison
2008	Spinning into Butter	Anika
2010	Please Give	Salesgirl
2012	Girl Most Likely	Hippie Girl
2014	Child of Grace	Dana Edwards
2016	Happy Yummy Chicken	Geraldine Spruce

=== Television ===
Year	Title	Role	Notes
2004	Law & Order: Special Victims Unit	Lizzie Jones	Episode: "Haunted"
2006	Conviction	Kim Scanton	Episode: "Indiscretion"
2009	Law & Order: Special Victims Unit	Starla	Episode: "Perverted"
2011	How to Make It in America	Metal Head Chick	Episode: "In or Out"
2013–2019	Orange Is the New Black	Leanne Taylor	Recurring role; 53 episodes
2017	Law & Order: Special Victims Unit	Carleen Jenkins	2 episodes
2017	Odd Mom Out	Morag Schwartz	Episode: "Jurdy Doody"

== Personal life ==
Myles is married to film actor Darcy Cadman.
