= Selenis Leyva =

American actress (born 1972)

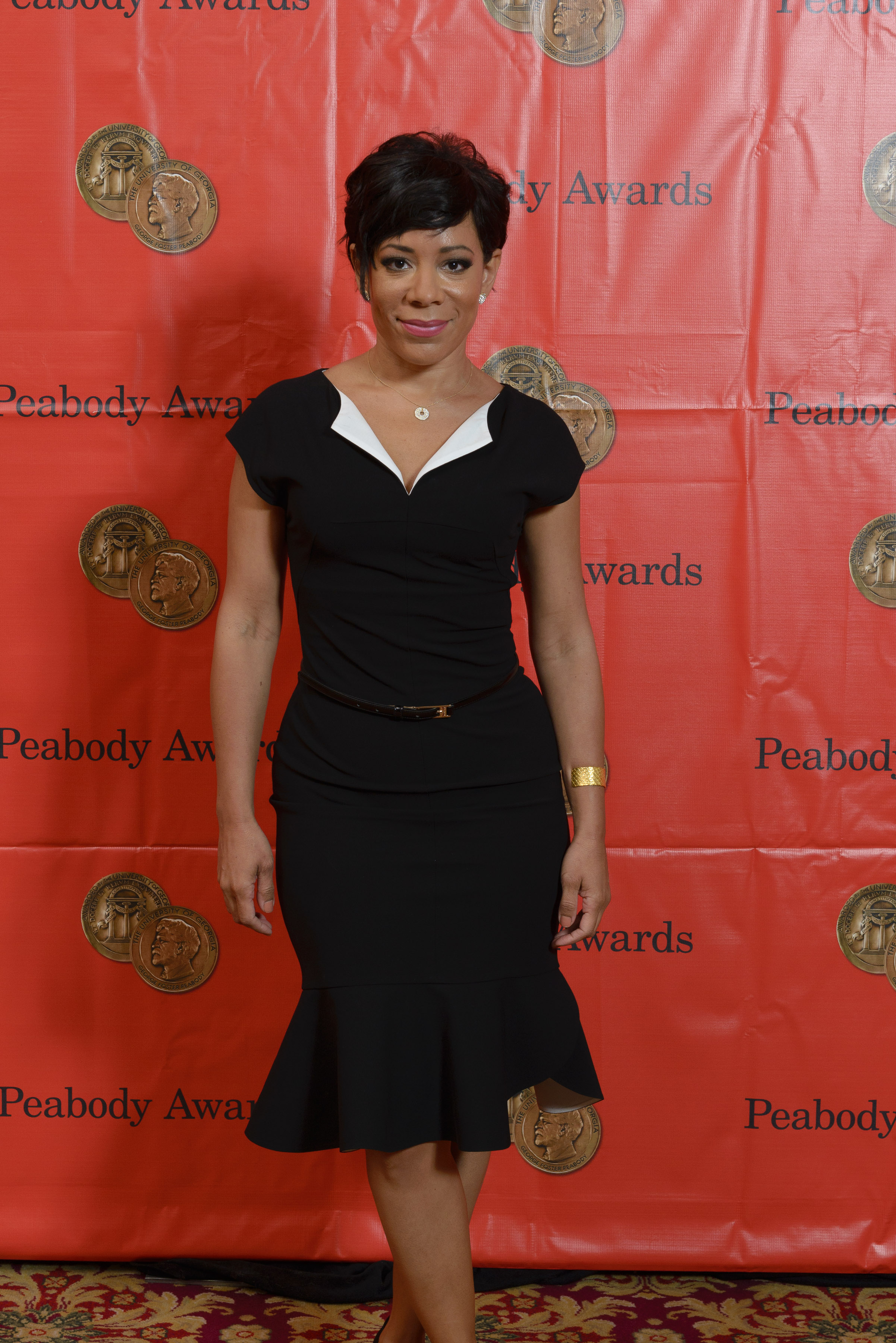
- Leyva at the 2014 Peabody Awards
- Born: May 26, 1972 (age 54)
- Occupation: Actress
- Years active: 1995–present
- Children: 1

Selenis Leyva (born May 26, 1972) is an American actress. She began her career appearing in Off-Broadway productions and had supporting roles on television, before her breakthrough role as Gloria Mendoza in the Netflix comedy-drama series, Orange Is the New Black (2013–19). She later starred in the Disney+ comedy-drama series, Diary of a Future President (2020–21), and the NBC sitcom Lopez vs Lopez (2022–25). Leyva also appeared in films Custody (2016), Spider-Man: Homecoming (2017), Breaking (2022) and Creed III (2023).

== Life and career ==
Selenis Leyva, a native of The Bronx, is of Cuban and Dominican descent. She has appeared in a number of Off-Broadway productions. Her professional debut was in the 1995 production of Puerto Rican Traveling Theatre's Simpson Street. She later acted in New World Stages' production of Celia in 2007, and Cherry Lane Theatre's Basilica in 2013. On television, Leyva co-starred in the 2001 Nickelodeon teen sitcom Taina and had a recurring role of Detective Mariluz Rivera in the NBC police drama series, Law & Order from 2004 to 2006, and also appeared in different roles on the show and on Law & Order: Special Victims Unit and Law & Order: Criminal Intent. She has guest-starred on Third Watch, The Sopranos, The Good Wife, Girls, and Elementary. In film, she had secondary roles in Maria Full of Grace (2004), Illegal Tender (2007) and Sex and the City 2 (2010).

In 2013, Leyva began starring as Gloria Mendoza, a Latina leader in the jail, in the Netflix comedy-drama series Orange Is the New Black. Her character was recurring for the first two seasons and she was promoted to series regular in Season 3. Along with cast, she received three Screen Actors Guild Award for Outstanding Performance by an Ensemble in a Comedy Series. She also received ALMA Award for Outstanding Special Achievement in Television in 2014. The series ended in 2019, after seven seasons. During her time in Orange Is the New Black, Leyva co-starred opposite Viola Davis and Catalina Sandino Moreno in the 2016 courtroom drama film Custody directed and written by James Lapine, and played Ms. Warren in the 2017 superhero film Spider-Man: Homecoming. In 2018, she had a supporting role in the Netflix miniseries Maniac.

In 2019, Leyva was cast in the Disney+ comedy-drama series, Diary of a Future President produced by Gina Rodriguez. The series premiered on January 17, 2020 and was cancelled in December 2021. She starred in the 2022 drama film, Breaking, the film premiered at the 2022 Sundance Film Festival and received Dramatic Special Jury Award for Best Ensemble Cast. Later in 2022 she was cast in the NBC sitcom, Lopez vs Lopez playing George Lopez's ex-wife. In 2023, Leyva appeared in the sports drama film Creed III.

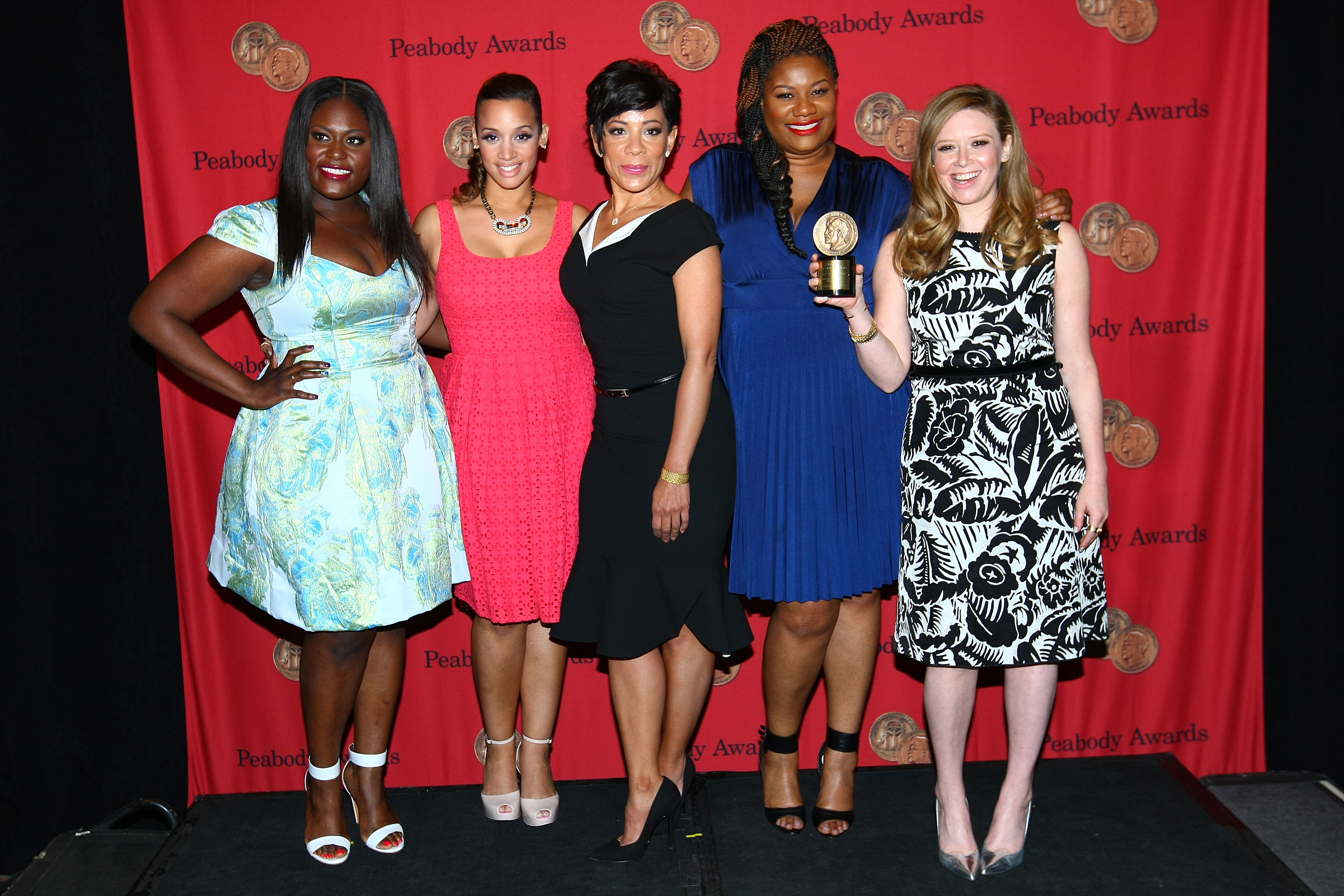
Leyva with Orange is the New Black co-stars at the 2014 Peabody Awards

== Personal life ==
Leyva has one daughter, Alina. She is a supporter of the LGBT community and revealed in June 2015 that her sister Marizol is transgender. Leyva is the co-author, with her sister Marizol, of the book My Sister: How One Sibling's Transition Changed Us Both, which was published by Bold Type Books in March 2020.

== Filmography ==
=== Film ===
Year	Title	Role	Notes
2000	Debutante	Daisy Dominguez	
2002	Apartment #5C	Luisa	
2004	Maria Full of Grace	Customs Inspector	
2007	Illegal Tender	Wanda	
2007	Ben's Plan	Maria	
2009	Don't Let Me Drown	Sonia	
2009	Ice Age: Dawn of the Dinosaurs	Additional Voices	Voice
2010	Sex and the City 2	Teacher	
2010	Trouble Child	Trouble Child	Short film
2011	Man in the Mirror	Sonia	Short film
2012	Ice Age: Continental Drift	Additional Voices	Voice
2013	Epic	Additional Voices	Voice
2014	Living with the Dead	Dr. Quenda	
2015	Chapter & Verse	Yolanda	
2016	Custody	Jackie	
2016	I Can I Will I Did	Maria	
2017	Spider-Man: Homecoming	Ms. Warren	
2020	Shadows	Pamela	Short film
2022	Breaking	Rosa Diaz	Sundance Film Festival Dramatic Special Jury Award for Best Ensemble Cast
2023	Crater	Maria	
2023	Creed III	Laura Chavez	

=== Television ===
Year	Title	Role	Notes
1999	Law & Order	Louisa	Episode: "Refuge: Part 2"
1999	Law & Order: Special Victims Unit	Lorinda Gutierrez	Episode: "Hysteria"
2001	The $treet	Kate	Episode: "Junk Bonds"
2001	Law & Order	DeeDee Salazar	Episode: "Sunday in the Park with Jorge"
2001	Taina	Titi Rose	Recurring role, 13 episodes
2001	100 Centre Street	Delfina Romero	Episodes: "Kids: Part 1" and "Kids: Part 2"
2002	Law & Order: Criminal Intent	Isabella Costas	Episode: "Homo Homini Lupis"
2003	Third Watch	Phyllis	Episode: "Goodbye to All That"
2004	Third Watch	Gonzalez	Episode: "Leap of Faith"
2004	Law & Order	Nita Cabrera	Episode: "Veteran's Day"
2004–2006	Law & Order	Detective Mariluz Rivera	Recurring role, 18 episodes
2005	Law & Order: Criminal Intent	Warden's Secretary	Episode: "Prisoner"
2006	The Sopranos	Jill Dibiaso	Episode: "Live Free or Die"
2007	Dirty Sexy Money	Detective Angelina Adams	Episode: "Pilot"
2008	New Amsterdam	Susan Boyle	Episode: "Pilot"
2010	Law & Order	Rona Henderson	Episode: "Boy on Fire"
2010	The Good Wife	Marisol	Episode: "Doubt"
2010	The Whole Truth	Claudia	Episode: "Liars"
2011	Law & Order: Criminal Intent	Detective Rivera	Episode: "Icarus"
2011	Person of Interest	Hosking	Episode: "Number Crunch"
2011–2012	Blue Bloods	Assistant M.E. Craig	Recurring role, 4 episodes
2012	Girls	Chastity	Episode: "Hannah's Diary"
2012	Elementary	Sara Castillo	Episode: "Child Predator"
2013	The Following	Detective Morales	Episode: "Chapter Two"
2013–2019	Orange Is the New Black	Gloria Mendoza	Recurring role (seasons 1–2); series regular (seasons 3–7); 88 episodes ALMA Award for Outstanding Special Achievement in Television (2014); Screen Actors Guild Award for Outstanding Performance by an Ensemble in a Comedy Series (2015–2016); Nomination — Screen Actors Guild Award for Outstanding Performance by an Ensemble in a Comedy Series (2018)
2015	Madam Secretary	Bolivian Ambassador Mariana Dominguez	Episode: "The Time Is at Hand"
2015	Veep	Governor Ramos	Episode: "B/ill"
2018	Dietland	Belle	2 episodes
2018	Maniac	Patricia Lugo	3 episodes
2018	Murphy Brown	Maria Gonzales	Episode: "Thanksgiving and Taking"
2018–2021	DuckTales	Detective Cabrera	Voice role; recurring
2019	Law & Order: Special Victims Unit	Samantha Morgan	Episode: "Facing Demons"
2020–2021	Diary of a Future President	Gabi Cañero-Reed	20 episodes Gracie Award for Best Actress in a Supporting Role - Musical or Comedy; Nominated — Imagen Award for Best Supporting Actress - Comedy (Television)
2020–2021	Saved by the Bell	Ms. Jimenez	3 episodes
2022	Our Flag Means Death	Nana	Episode: "This Is Happening"
2022–2025	Lopez vs Lopez	Rosie Lopez	Main role Nominated — Imagen Award for Best Supporting Actress - Comedy (Television)
2025	Law & Order	Defense Attorney Patricia Kaplan	Episode: "In God We Trust"

== See also ==
- List of Afro-Latinos
