= Nick Sandow =

American actor, writer and director (born 1966)

- Born: August 3, 1966 (age 60); The Bronx, New York City, U.S.
- Occupations: Actor; writer; producer; director
- Years active: 1991–present
- Children: 2

Nick Sandow (born August 3, 1966) is an American character actor, writer, producer and director, best known for his role as Joe Caputo in the Netflix comedy-drama series, Orange Is the New Black (2013–2019).

== Early life ==
Of Italian descent, Sandow grew up in the Italian neighborhood of Van Nest in the Bronx. He moved to Manhattan around age 19 to study acting under William Esper Studio in the Two-Year Professional Actor Training Program and work in theater.

== Career ==
Sandow made his debut appearing in an episode of television series Law & Order in 1992 and worked as a bartender while taking small acting jobs in New York City. He appeared in a number of films, such as Grind (1997), A Brooklyn State of Mind (1998), Return to Paradise (1998) and On the Run (1999). Sandow performed in the 1999 off-Broadway production of Halfway Home. He played mobster Henry Hill in the 2001 made-for-television crime drama film, The Big Heist. Sandow guest-starred on New York Undercover, Third Watch, NYPD Blue, Boardwalk Empire, Law & Order: Special Victims Unit, Law & Order: Criminal Intent, How to Make It in America and Blue Bloods. He began his directing career in theater on Off-Off-Broadway directing Dark Yellow, Chicken and From Riverdale to Riverhead. In 2011 he directed the immigrant drama film, Ponies based on play with the same name.

In 2013, Sandow was cast in the Netflix comedy-drama series, Orange Is the New Black, as prison administrator Joe Caputo, was originally supposed to have been for a handful of episodes for the show's first season. Instead, his role was expanded during the second season, and Sandow was made a series regular with the start of the third season. He received three Screen Actors Guild Award for Outstanding Performance by an Ensemble in a Comedy Series with the cast. In 2015 he wrote, directed and acted in The Wannabe. The film premiered at the Tribeca Film Festival and later got a wider release. In 2017 he received News and Documentary Emmy Awards nomination for producing the documentary series, Time: The Kalief Browder Story. In 2021 he was regular cast member in the short-lived CBS crime drama series, Clarice.

== Filmography ==
=== Film ===
Year	Title	Role	Notes
1994	Hand Gun	Earl's Man Max	
1996	The Mouse	Shamster #1	
1996	No Exit	Lenny Bentini	
1997	Arresting Gena	Paul	
1997	Grind	Lenny	
1997	One Night Stand	Mugger	
1998	A Brooklyn State of Mind	Vincent Stanco	
1998	No Looking Back	Goldie	
1998	Come To	Johnny	Short film
1998	Return to Paradise	Ravitch	
1998	Living Out Loud	Santi's Man	
1999	On the Run	Jack	
1999	Uninvited	Ed	
2000	The Day the Ponies Come Back	Joey	
2001	The Big Heist	Henry Hill	TV film
2001	Plan B	Tommy	
2001	Dust	White Trash	
2001	New Port South	Armstrong	
2002	Swimfan	Detective John Zabel	
2004	Connie and Carla	Al	
2005	The Collection	Several characters	
2007	Resurrecting the Champ	Marciano	
2007	The Lovebirds	Lenny	
2007	Mitch Albom's For One More Day	Sales Manager	TV film
2008	The Accidental Husband	Larry	
2008	Good Old Days	Dave	Short film
2009	The Hungry Ghosts	Gus	
2009	Frame of Mind	Jimmy	
2011	The Sitter	Officer Frank	
2012	The Fitzgerald Family Christmas	Corey	
2012	Two People He Never Saw	Eddie	Short film
2013	The Cold Lands	Foreman	
2013	Promised Land	Greg	Short film
2013	Dead Travis In	Travis	Short film
2013	All Roads Lead	Samuel Carter	
2014	Zarra's Law	Sal	
2015	Houses		Also producer
2015	Meadowland	Garza	
2015	The Wannabe	Anthony	Also director and writer
2016	Full Stop to an Infernal Planet	Lt. McCauley	
2017	Patti Cake$	Ray	
2018	Cabaret Maxime	Dominic	
2018	Stella's Last Weekend	Ron	
2023	The Unheard	Hank	
TBA	Vivien & the Florist	—N/a	Director

=== Television ===
Year	Title	Role	Notes
1992	Law & Order	Officer Nelson	Episode: "Blood Is Thicker..."
1995–1996	New York Undercover	Henry / White UNI	2 episodes
1996	Law & Order	Pete Pogosian	Episode: "Deadbeat"
1996	Due South	Barry Pappas	Episode: "Body Language"
1999	Law & Order	Andy Grenada	Episode: "Hunters"
2000–2002	Third Watch	Joe Lombardo	12 episodes
2003	NYPD Blue	Ray Wilentz	Episode: "Frickin' Fracker"
2003	The Jury	Mr. Krause	Episode: "Three Boys and a Gun"
2005	Law & Order: Criminal Intent	Det. Albert Kirkoff	Episode: "Unchained"
2006	Six Degrees	Louie	Episode: "Pilot"
2008	New Amsterdam	Frank	Episode: "Keep the Change"
2010	Mercy	Scott's Dad	Episode: "I Did Kill You, Didn't I?"
2010	How to Make It in America	Father Dan	3 episodes
2005	Law & Order: Criminal Intent	ADA Roydell Getty	Episode: "The Mobster Will See You Now"
2006	Law & Order: Special Victims Unit	Doug Kersten	Episode: "Class"
2010–2011	Blue Bloods	Lt. Alex Bello	4 episodes
2011	Nurse Jackie	Anthony Donovan	Episode: "Have You Met Mrs Jones?"
2011	CSI: Miami	Larry Gramercy	Episode: "Crowned"
2011–2012	Boardwalk Empire	Waxey Gordon	3 episodes
2012	Unforgettable	William "Bud" Spence	Episode: "Butterfly Effect"
2013–2019	Orange Is The New Black	Joe Caputo	80 episodes Directed 5 episodes Screen Actors Guild Award for Outstanding Performance by an Ensemble in a Comedy Series (2015–17); Nominated—Screen Actors Guild Award for Outstanding Performance by an Ensemble in a Comedy Series
2015	Law & Order: Special Victims Unit	Det. Ted McCormack	Episode: "Perverted Justice"
2021	Clarice	Murray Clarke	Main role
2025	Law & Order: Special Victims Unit	Leo Eichmeier	Episode: "Fidelis ad Mortem"

=== Theatre ===
- Halfway Home, Theatre at St. Clements, New York, 1999
- Baptism By Fire, Studio Dante, New York City, 2004
- Henry Flamethrow, Studio Dante, New York City, 2005 (Director)
