= Vicky Jeudy =

American actress

- Born: Queens, New York, U.S.
- Occupation: Actress
- Years active: 2006–present

Vicky Jeudy is an American actress, known for her role as Janae Watson on the Netflix comedy-drama series, Orange Is the New Black.

== Early life ==
Jeudy was born and raised in Queens, New York. She is of Haitian descent. Jeudy graduated from St. John's Preparatory School (Queens) in Astoria and studied theatre at State University of New York at New Paltz. During her years in college, she was a top 25 Semifinalist in the Miss New York competition.

== Career ==
Jeudy appeared in a number of short films before she landed the recurring role of Janae Watson in the Netflix comedy-drama series, Orange Is the New Black. Along with cast she received three Screen Actors Guild Award for Outstanding Performance by an Ensemble in a Comedy Series. In 2014, she made her network television debut in an episode of Law & Order: Special Victims Unit, and co-starred opposite Aunjanue Ellis in the independent film Romeo and Juliet in Harlem. After Orange Is the New Black, Jeudy starred in several independent films and guest-starred on New Amsterdam and Chicago P.D.. In 2022 she played the leading role in the thriller film, Stranger Next Door for Lifetime.

== Filmography ==
Year	Title	Role	Notes
2013	Shake	Judy	
2013	Addiction	Nandie	Short film
2013–2017, 2019	Orange Is the New Black	Janae Watson	Recurring role, 56 episodes Screen Actors Guild Award for Outstanding Performance by an Ensemble in a Comedy Series (2015–17); Nomination — Screen Actors Guild Award for Outstanding Performance by an Ensemble in a Comedy Series (2018)
2014	Law & Order: Special Victims Unit	Officer McKenna	Episode: "Amaro's One-Eighty"
2014	Romeo and Juliet in Harlem	Benvolia	
2017	Armstrong	Lauren	
2019	New Amsterdam	Alma Pearson	Episode: "Your Turn"
2019–2020	Chicago P.D.	Angela Nelson	Episodes: "Absolution" and "Mercy"
2020	Friend Request	Rayna	
2020	Rollers	Maddie	
2022	Stranger Next Door	Rochelle Sellers	
