= Dale Soules =

American actress

- Born: New Jersey, United States
- Occupation: Actress
- Known for: Orange Is The New Black (2014-2019)

Dale Soules is an American actress known for starring in The Messenger and portraying Frieda Berlin in Orange Is the New Black from 2014 to 2019.

== Early life ==
Soules grew up in the Greenwood Lake section of West Milford, New Jersey. She attended West Milford High School. While in high school, Soules became interested in acting and began acting in Summer stock theater, singing in church choirs and started studying acting at HB Studio.

== Career ==
Soules moved to New York in the mid-1960s after high school to pursue an acting career, and initially worked behind the scenes in theater in a variety of positions. Her big break came in 1968 when she landed her first Broadway role, the part of Jeanie in the original Broadway production of Hair.

She continued to appear in a number of theater productions including four years in the play The Magic Show, Hands on a Hard Body, Grey Gardens, and The Crucible.

Soules joined Orange Is the New Black during its second season in the recurring role of Frieda Berlin. Starting with the show's sixth season, Soules was promoted to a series regular.

== Personal life ==
Soules is openly lesbian.

== Filmography ==
=== Film ===
Year	Title	Role	Notes
1971	Prism	Eva	
1988	Blood Orgy of the Leather Girls	Teacher	
1997	Love God	Connie	
2006	Diggers	Silly Lilly Waitress	
2009	The Messenger	Cashier	
2009	Motherhood	Hester	
2012	Watching TV with the Red Chinese	Bag Lady	
2016	AWOL	Ruthie	
2017	Aardvark	Lucille	
2018	The Miseducation of Cameron Post	Grandma	
2022	Lightyear	Darby Steel (voice)	
2022	Midday Black Midnight Blue	Kath	
2022	My Love Affair with Marriage	Official (voice)	
2023	She Came to Me	Aunt Moxie	

=== Television ===
Year	Title	Role	Notes
1975	Really Rosie	Nutshell Kid (voice)	Television special
1981	American Playhouse	Frances	Episode: "Until She Talks"
2005	Law & Order: Criminal Intent	Mysty	Episode: "Stress Connection"
2005	Law & Order	Agatha Jacobs	Episode: "Red Ball"
2007	American Masters	Mrs. Wainwright	Episode: "Novel Reflections: The American Dream"
2010	How to Make It in America	Doris	Episode: "Paper, Denim + Dollars"
2010	Big Lake	Shelley	Episode: "Chris Moves In"
2013	Unforgettable	Alma Delaney	Episode: "Line Up or Shut Up"
2014–2019	Orange Is the New Black	Frieda Berlin	51 episodes
2017	At Home with Amy Sedaris	Delta Mung	Episode: "Making Love"
2019	New Amsterdam	Allison Medrano	Episode: "The Blues"
2019	The Marvelous Mrs. Maisel	Margaret	Episodes: "Hands!"
2021	Invasion	Motel Receptionist	Episode: "Orion"
2023–present	Digman!	Agatha (voice)	Main cast
2024–2025	Star Wars: Skeleton Crew	Chaelt	4 episodes

=== Stage ===
Year	Title	Role	Notes	Ref.
1968	Hair	Jeanie (Replacement)	Blitmore Theatre, Broadway	
1972	Dude	Shadow	Broadway Theatre, Broadway	
1973	Lotta	Lotta	Public Theater, Off-Broadway	
1974	More Than You Deserve	Vietnamese	Public Theater, Off-Broadway	
1974	The Magic Show	Cal	Cort Theatre, Broadway	
1979	Getting Out	Arlene	Theater de Lys, Off-Broadway	
1997	The Joy of Going Somewhere Definite	Patsy/Older Woman/ Waitress	Atlantic Theater Company, Off-Broadway	
2002	The Crucible	Sarah Good	Virginia Theatre, Broadway	
2006	Grey Gardens	Edith Bouvier Beale (Standby)	Walter Kerr Theatre, Broadway	
2012	Rutherford & Son	Mrs. Henderson	Mint Theater Company	
2015	Posterity	Greta	Atlantic Theater Company, Off-Broadway	
2014	I Remember Mama	Papa	Transport Group, Off-Broadway	
2015	Shows for Days	Sid	Lincoln Center Theater, Off-Broadway	
2017	The Mother of Invention	Jane	Abingdon Theatre Company, Off-Broadway	
2018	Woman and Scarecrow	Aunty Ah	Irish Repertory Theatre, Off-Broadway	
2022	The Lucky Star	Arnold	59E59 Theatre, Off-Broadway	
2024	The Welkin	Sarah Smith	Atlantic Theater Company, Off-Broadway	
