= Actor Award for Outstanding Performance by an Ensemble in a Comedy Series =

Award

Actor Award for Best Ensemble in a Comedy Series
- Awarded for: Outstanding Performance by an Ensemble in a Comedy Series
- Location: Los Angeles, California
- Presented by: SAG-AFTRA
- Currently held by: The cast of The Studio (2025)
- Website: sagawards.org

The Actor Award for Outstanding Performance by a Cast (or Ensemble) in a Comedy Series is an award given by the Screen Actors Guild to honor the finest ensemble acting achievements in comedy series.

== Eligibility ==
In order for an individual actor to be eligible for an award as part of the ensemble, they must meet one of the following requirements:

- Have a series regular contract, perform, and be credited in a predetermined minimum number of original episodes airing during the eligibility period.
- Have guest star billing, perform, and be credited in a majority (51%) of original episodes during the eligibility period.

In cases of undefined billing in foreign productions where series regular, guest star, and co-star designations are not made, performers must appear in a majority (51 percent) of original episodes aired in the calendar year 2025 for inclusion in the ensemble. Actors with co-star billing are not eligible for inclusion.

== Winners and nominees ==
indicates the winner.

=== 1990s ===
Year	Series	Cast members
1994 (1st)	Seinfeld	Jason Alexander, Julia Louis-Dreyfus, Michael Richards, Jerry Seinfeld
1994 (1st)	Frasier	Peri Gilpin, Kelsey Grammer, Jane Leeves, John Mahoney, David Hyde Pierce
1994 (1st)	Mad About You	Helen Hunt, Leila Kenzle, Richard Kind, Lisa Kudrow, John Pankow, Anne Ramsay, Paul Reiser
1994 (1st)	Murphy Brown	Candice Bergen, Pat Corley, Faith Ford, Charles Kimbrough, Robert Pastorelli, Joe Regalbuto, Grant Shaud
1994 (1st)	Northern Exposure	Darren E. Burrows, John Corbett, Barry Corbin, John Cullum, Cynthia Geary, Elaine Miles, Rob Morrow, Peg Phillips, Teri Polo, Paul Provenza, Janine Turner
1995 (2nd)	Friends	Jennifer Aniston, Courteney Cox, Lisa Kudrow, Matt LeBlanc, Matthew Perry, David Schwimmer
1995 (2nd)	Cybill	Christine Baranski, Dedee Pfeiffer, Alan Rosenberg, Cybill Shepherd, Alicia Witt, Tom Wopat
1995 (2nd)	Frasier	Dan Butler, Peri Gilpin, Kelsey Grammer, Jane Leeves, John Mahoney, David Hyde Pierce
1995 (2nd)	Mad About You	Helen Hunt, Leila Kenzle, John Pankow, Anne Ramsay, Paul Reiser
1995 (2nd)	Seinfeld	Jason Alexander, Julia Louis-Dreyfus, Michael Richards, Jerry Seinfeld
1996 (3rd)	Seinfeld	Jason Alexander, Julia Louis-Dreyfus, Michael Richards, Jerry Seinfeld
1996 (3rd)	3rd Rock from the Sun	Jane Curtin, Joseph Gordon-Levitt, Kristen Johnston, John Lithgow, French Stewart
1996 (3rd)	Frasier	Dan Butler, Peri Gilpin, Kelsey Grammer, Jane Leeves, John Mahoney, David Hyde Pierce
1996 (3rd)	Mad About You	Helen Hunt, Leila Kenzle, John Pankow, Anne Ramsay, Paul Reiser
1996 (3rd)	Remember WENN	Tom Beckett, Carolee Carmello, George Hall, Margaret Hall, John Bedford Lloyd, Melinda Mullins, Christopher Murney, Amanda Naughton, Hugh O'Gorman, Kevin O'Rourke, Dina Spybey, Mary Stout
1997 (4th)	Seinfeld	Jason Alexander, Julia Louis-Dreyfus, Michael Richards, Jerry Seinfeld
1997 (4th)	3rd Rock from the Sun	Jane Curtin, Joseph Gordon-Levitt, Kristen Johnston, Simbi Khali, Wayne Knight, John Lithgow, French Stewart, Elmarie Wendel
1997 (4th)	Ally McBeal	Gil Bellows, Lisa Nicole Carson, Calista Flockhart, Greg Germann, Jane Krakowski, Courtney Thorne-Smith
1997 (4th)	Frasier	Dan Butler, Peri Gilpin, Kelsey Grammer, Jane Leeves, John Mahoney, David Hyde Pierce
1997 (4th)	Mad About You	Robin Bartlett, Cynthia Harris, Helen Hunt, Leila Kenzle, John Pankow, Paul Reiser, Louis Zorich
1998 (5th)	Ally McBeal	Gil Bellows, Lisa Nicole Carson, Portia de Rossi, Calista Flockhart, Greg Germann, Jane Krakowski, Lucy Liu, Peter MacNicol, Vonda Shepard, Courtney Thorne-Smith
1998 (5th)	3rd Rock from the Sun	Jane Curtin, Joseph Gordon-Levitt, Kristen Johnston, Simbi Khali, Wayne Knight, John Lithgow, French Stewart, Elmarie Wendel
1998 (5th)	Everybody Loves Raymond	Peter Boyle, Brad Garrett, Patricia Heaton, Doris Roberts, Ray Romano, Madylin Sweeten
1998 (5th)	Frasier	Dan Butler, Peri Gilpin, Kelsey Grammer, Jane Leeves, John Mahoney, David Hyde Pierce
1998 (5th)	Friends	Jennifer Aniston, Courteney Cox, Lisa Kudrow, Matt LeBlanc, Matthew Perry, David Schwimmer
1999 (6th)	Frasier	Dan Butler, Peri Gilpin, Kelsey Grammer, Jane Leeves, John Mahoney, David Hyde Pierce
1999 (6th)	Ally McBeal	Gil Bellows, Lisa Nicole Carson, Portia de Rossi, Calista Flockhart, Greg Germann, Jane Krakowski, Lucy Liu, Peter MacNicol, Vonda Shepard, Courtney Thorne-Smith
1999 (6th)	Everybody Loves Raymond	Peter Boyle, Brad Garrett, Patricia Heaton, Doris Roberts, Ray Romano, Madylin Sweeten
1999 (6th)	Friends	Jennifer Aniston, Courteney Cox, Lisa Kudrow, Matt LeBlanc, Matthew Perry, David Schwimmer
1999 (6th)	Sports Night	Josh Charles, Robert Guillaume, Felicity Huffman, Peter Krause, Sabrina Lloyd, Joshua Malina

=== 2000s ===
Year	Series	Cast members
2000 (7th)	Will & Grace	Sean Hayes, Eric McCormack, Debra Messing, Megan Mullally
2000 (7th)	Ally McBeal	Lisa Nicole Carson, Portia de Rossi, Robert Downey Jr., Calista Flockhart, Greg Germann, Jane Krakowski, James LeGros, Lucy Liu, Peter MacNicol, Vonda Shepard
2000 (7th)	Frasier	Peri Gilpin, Kelsey Grammer, Jane Leeves, John Mahoney, David Hyde Pierce
2000 (7th)	Friends	Jennifer Aniston, Courteney Cox, Lisa Kudrow, Matt LeBlanc, Matthew Perry, David Schwimmer
2000 (7th)	Sex and the City	Kim Cattrall, Kristin Davis, Cynthia Nixon, Sarah Jessica Parker
2001 (8th)	Sex and the City	Kim Cattrall, Kristin Davis, Cynthia Nixon, Sarah Jessica Parker
2001 (8th)	Everybody Loves Raymond	Peter Boyle, Brad Garrett, Patricia Heaton, Doris Roberts, Ray Romano, Madylin Sweeten
2001 (8th)	Frasier	Peri Gilpin, Kelsey Grammer, Jane Leeves, John Mahoney, David Hyde Pierce
2001 (8th)	Friends	Jennifer Aniston, Courteney Cox, Lisa Kudrow, Matt LeBlanc, Matthew Perry, David Schwimmer
2001 (8th)	Will & Grace	Sean Hayes, Eric McCormack, Debra Messing, Shelley Morrison, Megan Mullally
2002 (9th)	Everybody Loves Raymond	Peter Boyle, Brad Garrett, Patricia Heaton, Doris Roberts, Ray Romano, Madylin Sweeten
2002 (9th)	Frasier	Peri Gilpin, Kelsey Grammer, Jane Leeves, John Mahoney, David Hyde Pierce
2002 (9th)	Friends	Jennifer Aniston, Courteney Cox, Lisa Kudrow, Matt LeBlanc, Matthew Perry, David Schwimmer
2002 (9th)	Sex and the City	Kim Cattrall, Kristin Davis, Cynthia Nixon, Sarah Jessica Parker
2002 (9th)	Will & Grace	Sean Hayes, Eric McCormack, Debra Messing, Shelley Morrison, Megan Mullally
2003 (10th)	Sex and the City	Kim Cattrall, Kristin Davis, Cynthia Nixon, Sarah Jessica Parker
2003 (10th)	Everybody Loves Raymond	Peter Boyle, Brad Garrett, Patricia Heaton, Doris Roberts, Ray Romano, Madylin Sweeten
2003 (10th)	Frasier	Peri Gilpin, Kelsey Grammer, Jane Leeves, John Mahoney, David Hyde Pierce
2003 (10th)	Friends	Jennifer Aniston, Courteney Cox, Lisa Kudrow, Matt LeBlanc, Matthew Perry, David Schwimmer
2003 (10th)	Will & Grace	Sean Hayes, Eric McCormack, Debra Messing, Megan Mullally
2004 (11th)	Desperate Housewives	Andrea Bowen, Ricardo Chavira, Marcia Cross, Steven Culp, James Denton, Teri Hatcher, Felicity Huffman, Cody Kasch, Eva Longoria, Jesse Metcalfe, Mark Moses, Nicollette Sheridan, Brenda Strong
2004 (11th)	Arrested Development	Will Arnett, Jason Bateman, Michael Cera, David Cross, Portia de Rossi, Tony Hale, Alia Shawkat, Jeffrey Tambor, Jessica Walter
2004 (11th)	Everybody Loves Raymond	Peter Boyle, Brad Garrett, Patricia Heaton, Monica Horan, Doris Roberts, Ray Romano, Madylin Sweeten
2004 (11th)	Sex and the City	Kim Cattrall, Kristin Davis, Cynthia Nixon, Sarah Jessica Parker
2004 (11th)	Will & Grace	Sean Hayes, Eric McCormack, Debra Messing, Megan Mullally
2005 (12th)	Desperate Housewives	Roger Bart, Andrea Bowen, Mehcad Brooks, Ricardo Chavira, Marcia Cross, Steven Culp, James Denton, Teri Hatcher, Felicity Huffman, Brent Kinsman, Shane Kinsman, Eva Longoria, Mark Moses, Doug Savant, Nicollette Sheridan, Brenda Strong, Alfre Woodard
2005 (12th)	Arrested Development	Will Arnett, Jason Bateman, Michael Cera, David Cross, Portia de Rossi, Tony Hale, Alia Shawkat, Jeffrey Tambor, Jessica Walter
2005 (12th)	Boston Legal	René Auberjonois, Ryan Michelle Bathe, Candice Bergen, Julie Bowen, Justin Mentell, Rhona Mitra, Monica Potter, William Shatner, James Spader, Mark Valley
2005 (12th)	Curb Your Enthusiasm	Shelley Berman, Larry David, Susie Essman, Jeff Garlin, Cheryl Hines, Richard Lewis
2005 (12th)	Everybody Loves Raymond	Peter Boyle, Brad Garrett, Patricia Heaton, Monica Horan, Doris Roberts, Ray Romano, Madylin Sweeten
2005 (12th)	My Name Is Earl	Jason Lee, Jaime Pressly, Eddie Steeples, Ethan Suplee, Nadine Velazquez
2006 (13th)	The Office	Leslie David Baker, Brian Baumgartner, Steve Carell, David Denman, Jenna Fischer, Kate Flannery, Melora Hardin, Mindy Kaling, Angela Kinsey, John Krasinski, Paul Lieberstein, B. J. Novak, Oscar Nunez, Phyllis Smith, Rainn Wilson
2006 (13th)	Desperate Housewives	Andrea Bowen, Mehcad Brooks, Ricardo Chavira, Marcia Cross, James Denton, Teri Hatcher, Josh Henderson, Zane Huett, Felicity Huffman, Kathryn Joosten, Nashawn Kearse, Brent Kinsman, Shane Kinsman, Joy Lauren, Eva Longoria, Kyle MacLachlan, Laurie Metcalf, Shawn Pyfrom, Doug Savant, Dougray Scott, Nicollette Sheridan, Brenda Strong, Kiersten Warren, Alfre Woodard
2006 (13th)	Entourage	Kevin Connolly, Kevin Dillon, Jerry Ferrara, Adrian Grenier, Rex Lee, Debi Mazar, Jeremy Piven, Perrey Reeves
2006 (13th)	Ugly Betty	Alan Dale, America Ferrera, Mark Indelicato, Ashley Jensen, Eric Mabius, Becki Newton, Ana Ortiz, Tony Plana, Kevin Sussman, Michael Urie, Vanessa Williams
2006 (13th)	Weeds	Martin Donovan, Alexander Gould, Justin Kirk, Romany Malco, Kevin Nealon, Mary-Louise Parker, Hunter Parrish, Tonye Patano, Elizabeth Perkins
2007 (14th)	The Office	Leslie David Baker, Brian Baumgartner, Steve Carell, David Denman, Jenna Fischer, Kate Flannery, Melora Hardin, Mindy Kaling, Angela Kinsey, John Krasinski, Paul Lieberstein, B. J. Novak, Oscar Nunez, Phyllis Smith, Rainn Wilson
2007 (14th)	30 Rock	Scott Adsit, Alec Baldwin, Katrina Bowden, Tina Fey, Judah Friedlander, Jane Krakowski, Jack McBrayer, Tracy Morgan, Keith Powell, Lonny Ross
2007 (14th)	Desperate Housewives	Andrea Bowen, Ricardo Chavira, Marcia Cross, Dana Delany, James Denton, Nathan Fillion, Lyndsy Fonseca, Rachel Fox, Teri Hatcher, Zane Huett, Felicity Huffman, Kathryn Joosten, Brent Kinsman, Shane Kinsman, Joy Lauren, Eva Longoria, Kyle MacLachlan, Shawn Pyfrom, Doug Savant, Dougray Scott, Nicollette Sheridan, John Slattery, Brenda Strong
2007 (14th)	Entourage	Kevin Connolly, Kevin Dillon, Jerry Ferrara, Adrian Grenier, Rex Lee, Debi Mazar, Jeremy Piven, Perrey Reeves
2007 (14th)	Ugly Betty	Alan Dale, America Ferrera, Mark Indelicato, Ashley Jensen, Eric Mabius, Becki Newton, Ana Ortiz, Tony Plana, Stelio Savante, Kevin Sussman, Michael Urie, Vanessa Williams
2008 (15th)	30 Rock	Scott Adsit, Alec Baldwin, Katrina Bowden, Tina Fey, Judah Friedlander, Jane Krakowski, Jack McBrayer, Tracy Morgan, Keith Powell, Lonny Ross
2008 (15th)	Desperate Housewives	Kendall Applegate, Andrea Bowen, Charles Carver, Max Carver, Ricardo Chavira, Marcia Cross, Dana Delany, James Denton, Lyndsy Fonseca, Rachel Fox, Teri Hatcher, Zane Huett, Felicity Huffman, Kathryn Joosten, Brent Kinsman, Shane Kinsman, Joy Lauren, Eva Longoria, Kyle MacLachlan, Neal McDonough, Joshua Logan Moore, Shawn Pyfrom, Doug Savant, Nicollette Sheridan, Brenda Strong
2008 (15th)	Entourage	Kevin Connolly, Kevin Dillon, Jerry Ferrara, Adrian Grenier, Rex Lee, Jeremy Piven, Perrey Reeves
2008 (15th)	The Office	Leslie David Baker, Brian Baumgartner, Creed Bratton, Steve Carell, Jenna Fischer, Kate Flannery, Melora Hardin, Ed Helms, Mindy Kaling, Angela Kinsey, John Krasinski, Paul Lieberstein, B. J. Novak, Oscar Nunez, Craig Robinson, Phyllis Smith, Rainn Wilson
2008 (15th)	Weeds	Demián Bichir, Julie Bowen, Enrique Castillo, Guillermo Díaz, Alexander Gould, Allie Grant, Justin Kirk, Hemky Madera, Andy Milder, Kevin Nealon, Mary-Louise Parker, Hunter Parrish, Elizabeth Perkins, Jack Stehlin
2009 (16th)	Glee	Dianna Agron, Chris Colfer, Patrick Gallagher, Jessalyn Gilsig, Jane Lynch, Jayma Mays, Kevin McHale, Lea Michele, Cory Monteith, Heather Morris, Matthew Morrison, Amber Riley, Naya Rivera, Mark Salling, Harry Shum Jr., Josh Sussman, Dijon Talton, Iqbal Theba, Jenna Ushkowitz
2009 (16th)	30 Rock	Scott Adsit, Alec Baldwin, Katrina Bowden, Kevin Brown, Grizz Chapman, Tina Fey, Judah Friedlander, Jane Krakowski, Jack McBrayer, Tracy Morgan, Maulik Pancholy, Keith Powell, Lonny Ross
2009 (16th)	Curb Your Enthusiasm	Larry David, Susie Essman, Jeff Garlin, Cheryl Hines
2009 (16th)	Modern Family	Julie Bowen, Ty Burrell, Jesse Tyler Ferguson, Nolan Gould, Sarah Hyland, Ed O'Neill, Rico Rodriguez, Eric Stonestreet, Sofía Vergara, Ariel Winter
2009 (16th)	The Office	Leslie David Baker, Brian Baumgartner, Creed Bratton, Steve Carell, Jenna Fischer, Kate Flannery, Ed Helms, Mindy Kaling, Ellie Kemper, Angela Kinsey, John Krasinski, Paul Lieberstein, B. J. Novak, Oscar Nunez, Craig Robinson, Phyllis Smith, Rainn Wilson

=== 2010s ===
Year	Series	Cast members
2010 (17th)	Modern Family	Julie Bowen, Ty Burrell, Jesse Tyler Ferguson, Nolan Gould, Sarah Hyland, Ed O'Neill, Rico Rodriguez, Eric Stonestreet, Sofía Vergara, Ariel Winter
2010 (17th)	30 Rock	Scott Adsit, Alec Baldwin, Katrina Bowden, Kevin Brown, Grizz Chapman, Tina Fey, Judah Friedlander, Jane Krakowski, John Lutz, Jack McBrayer, Tracy Morgan, Maulik Pancholy, Keith Powell
2010 (17th)	Glee	Max Adler, Dianna Agron, Chris Colfer, Jane Lynch, Jayma Mays, Kevin McHale, Lea Michele, Cory Monteith, Heather Morris, Matthew Morrison, Mike O'Malley, Chord Overstreet, Amber Riley, Naya Rivera, Mark Salling, Harry Shum Jr., Iqbal Theba, Jenna Ushkowitz
2010 (17th)	Hot in Cleveland	Valerie Bertinelli, Jane Leeves, Wendie Malick, Betty White
2010 (17th)	The Office	Leslie David Baker, Brian Baumgartner, Creed Bratton, Steve Carell, Jenna Fischer, Kate Flannery, Ed Helms, Mindy Kaling, Ellie Kemper, Angela Kinsey, John Krasinski, Paul Lieberstein, B. J. Novak, Oscar Nunez, Craig Robinson, Phyllis Smith, Rainn Wilson, Zach Woods
2011 (18th)	Modern Family	Aubrey Anderson-Emmons, Julie Bowen, Ty Burrell, Jesse Tyler Ferguson, Nolan Gould, Sarah Hyland, Ed O'Neill, Rico Rodriguez, Eric Stonestreet, Sofía Vergara, Ariel Winter
2011 (18th)	30 Rock	Scott Adsit, Alec Baldwin, Katrina Bowden, Kevin Brown, Grizz Chapman, Tina Fey, Judah Friedlander, Jane Krakowski, John Lutz, Jack McBrayer, Tracy Morgan, Maulik Pancholy, Keith Powell
2011 (18th)	The Big Bang Theory	Mayim Bialik, Kaley Cuoco, Johnny Galecki, Simon Helberg, Kunal Nayyar, Jim Parsons, Melissa Rauch
2011 (18th)	Glee	Dianna Agron, Chris Colfer, Darren Criss, Ashley Fink, Dot-Marie Jones, Jane Lynch, Jayma Mays, Kevin McHale, Lea Michele, Cory Monteith, Heather Morris, Matthew Morrison, Mike O'Malley, Chord Overstreet, Lauren Potter, Amber Riley, Naya Rivera, Mark Salling, Harry Shum Jr., Iqbal Theba, Jenna Ushkowitz
2011 (18th)	The Office	Leslie David Baker, Brian Baumgartner, Creed Bratton, Steve Carell, Jenna Fischer, Kate Flannery, Ed Helms, Mindy Kaling, Ellie Kemper, Angela Kinsey, John Krasinski, Paul Lieberstein, B. J. Novak, Oscar Nunez, Craig Robinson, Phyllis Smith, James Spader, Rainn Wilson, Zach Woods
2012 (19th)	Modern Family	Aubrey Anderson-Emmons, Julie Bowen, Ty Burrell, Jesse Tyler Ferguson, Nolan Gould, Sarah Hyland, Ed O'Neill, Rico Rodriguez, Eric Stonestreet, Sofía Vergara, Ariel Winter
2012 (19th)	30 Rock	Scott Adsit, Alec Baldwin, Katrina Bowden, Kevin Brown, Grizz Chapman, Tina Fey, Judah Friedlander, Jane Krakowski, John Lutz, Jack McBrayer, Tracy Morgan, Maulik Pancholy, Keith Powell
2012 (19th)	The Big Bang Theory	Mayim Bialik, Kaley Cuoco, Johnny Galecki, Simon Helberg, Kunal Nayyar, Jim Parsons, Melissa Rauch
2012 (19th)	Glee	Dianna Agron, Chris Colfer, Darren Criss, Dot-Marie Jones, Samuel Larsen, Vanessa Lengies, Jane Lynch, Jayma Mays, Kevin McHale, Lea Michele, Cory Monteith, Heather Morris, Matthew Morrison, Mike O'Malley, Alex Newell, Chord Overstreet, Lauren Potter, Amber Riley, Naya Rivera, Mark Salling, Harry Shum Jr., Iqbal Theba, Jenna Ushkowitz
2012 (19th)	The Office	Leslie David Baker, Brian Baumgartner, Creed Bratton, Jenna Fischer, Kate Flannery, Ed Helms, Mindy Kaling, Ellie Kemper, Angela Kinsey, John Krasinski, Paul Lieberstein, B. J. Novak, Oscar Nunez, Craig Robinson, Phyllis Smith, Rainn Wilson, Zach Woods
2012 (19th)	Nurse Jackie	Edie Falco, Eve Best, Merritt Wever, Paul Schulze, Peter Facinelli, Dominic Fumusa, Anna Deavere Smith, Stephen Wallem, Ruby Jerins, Mackenzie Aladjem, Haaz Sleiman, Bobby Cannavale
2013 (20th)	Modern Family	Aubrey Anderson-Emmons, Julie Bowen, Ty Burrell, Jesse Tyler Ferguson, Nolan Gould, Sarah Hyland, Ed O'Neill, Rico Rodriguez, Eric Stonestreet, Sofía Vergara, Ariel Winter
2013 (20th)	30 Rock	Scott Adsit, Alec Baldwin, Katrina Bowden, Kevin Brown, Grizz Chapman, Tina Fey, Judah Friedlander, Jane Krakowski, John Lutz, James Marsden, Jack McBrayer, Tracy Morgan, Maulik Pancholy, Keith Powell
2013 (20th)	Arrested Development	Will Arnett, Jason Bateman, John Beard, Michael Cera, David Cross, Portia de Rossi, Isla Fisher, Tony Hale, Ron Howard, Liza Minnelli, Alia Shawkat, Jeffrey Tambor, Jessica Walter, Henry Winkler
2013 (20th)	The Big Bang Theory	Mayim Bialik, Kaley Cuoco, Johnny Galecki, Simon Helberg, Kunal Nayyar, Jim Parsons, Melissa Rauch, Kevin Sussman
2013 (20th)	Veep	Sufe Bradshaw, Anna Chlumsky, Gary Cole, Kevin Dunn, Tony Hale, Julia Louis-Dreyfus, Reid Scott, Timothy Simons, Matt Walsh
2014 (21st)	Orange Is the New Black	Uzo Aduba, Jason Biggs, Danielle Brooks, Laverne Cox, Jackie Cruz, Catherine Curtin, Lea DeLaria, Beth Fowler, Yvette Freeman, Germar Terrell Gardner, Kimiko Glenn, Annie Golden, Diane Guerrero, Michael J. Harney, Vicky Jeudy, Julie Lake, Lauren Lapkus, Selenis Leyva, Natasha Lyonne, Taryn Manning, Joel Marsh Garland, Matt McGorry, Adrienne C. Moore, Kate Mulgrew, Emma Myles, Jessica Pimentel, Dascha Polanco, Alysia Reiner, Judith Roberts, Elizabeth Rodriguez, Barbara Rosenblat, Nick Sandow, Abigail Savage, Taylor Schilling, Constance Shulman, Dale Soules, Yael Stone, Lorraine Toussaint, Lin Tucci, Samira Wiley
2014 (21st)	The Big Bang Theory	Mayim Bialik, Kaley Cuoco, Johnny Galecki, Simon Helberg, Kunal Nayyar, Jim Parsons, Melissa Rauch
2014 (21st)	Brooklyn Nine-Nine	Stephanie Beatriz, Dirk Blocker, Andre Braugher, Terry Crews, Melissa Fumero, Joe Lo Truglio, Joel McKinnon Miller, Chelsea Peretti, Andy Samberg
2014 (21st)	Modern Family	Aubrey Anderson-Emmons, Julie Bowen, Ty Burrell, Jesse Tyler Ferguson, Nolan Gould, Sarah Hyland, Ed O'Neill, Rico Rodriguez, Eric Stonestreet, Sofía Vergara, Ariel Winter
2014 (21st)	Veep	Sufe Bradshaw, Anna Chlumsky, Gary Cole, Kevin Dunn, Tony Hale, Julia Louis-Dreyfus, Reid Scott, Timothy Simons, Matt Walsh
2015 (22nd)	Orange Is the New Black	Uzo Aduba, Mike Birbiglia, Marsha Stephanie Blake, Danielle Brooks, Laverne Cox, Jackie Cruz, Catherine Curtin, Lea DeLaria, Beth Fowler, Joel Marsh Garland, Kimiko Glenn, Annie Golden, Diane Guerrero, Michael J. Harney, Vicky Jeudy, Selenis Leyva, Taryn Manning, Adrienne C. Moore, Kate Mulgrew, Emma Myles, Matt Peters, Lori Petty, Jessica Pimentel, Dascha Polanco, Laura Prepon, Elizabeth Rodriguez, Ruby Rose, Nick Sandow, Abigail Savage, Taylor Schilling, Constance Shulman, Dale Soules, Yael Stone, Samira Wiley
2015 (22nd)	The Big Bang Theory	Mayim Bialik, Kaley Cuoco, Johnny Galecki, Simon Helberg, Kunal Nayyar, Jim Parsons, Melissa Rauch
2015 (22nd)	Key & Peele	Keegan-Michael Key, Jordan Peele
2015 (22nd)	Modern Family	Aubrey Anderson-Emmons, Julie Bowen, Ty Burrell, Jesse Tyler Ferguson, Nolan Gould, Sarah Hyland, Ed O'Neill, Rico Rodriguez, Eric Stonestreet, Sofía Vergara, Ariel Winter
2015 (22nd)	Transparent	Alexandra Billings, Carrie Brownstein, Jay Duplass, Kathryn Hahn, Gaby Hoffmann, Cherry Jones, Amy Landecker, Judith Light, Hari Nef, Emily Robinson, Jeffrey Tambor
2015 (22nd)	Veep	Diedrich Bader, Sufe Bradshaw, Anna Chlumsky, Gary Cole, Kevin Dunn, Tony Hale, Hugh Laurie, Julia Louis-Dreyfus, Phil Reeves, Sam Richardson, Reid Scott, Timothy Simons, Sarah Sutherland, Matt Walsh
2016 (23rd)	Orange Is the New Black	Uzo Aduba, Alan Aisenberg, Danielle Brooks, Blair Brown, Jackie Cruz, Lea DeLaria, Beth Dover, Kimiko Glenn, Annie Golden, Laura Gómez, Diane Guerrero, Michael J. Harney, Brad William Henke, Vicky Jeudy, Julie Lake, Selenis Leyva, Natasha Lyonne, Taryn Manning, James McMenamin, Adrienne C. Moore, Kate Mulgrew, Emma Myles, Matt Peters, Lori Petty, Jessica Pimentel, Dascha Polanco, Laura Prepon, Jolene Purdy, Elizabeth Rodriguez, Nick Sandow, Abigail Savage, Taylor Schilling, Constance Shulman, Dale Soules, Yael Stone, Lin Tucci, Samira Wiley
2016 (23rd)	The Big Bang Theory	Mayim Bialik, Kaley Cuoco, Johnny Galecki, Simon Helberg, Kunal Nayyar, Jim Parsons, Melissa Rauch
2016 (23rd)	Black-ish	Anthony Anderson, Miles Brown, Deon Cole, Laurence Fishburne, Jenifer Lewis, Peter Mackenzie, Marsai Martin, Jeff Meacham, Tracee Ellis Ross, Marcus Scribner, Yara Shahidi
2016 (23rd)	Modern Family	Aubrey Anderson-Emmons, Julie Bowen, Ty Burrell, Jesse Tyler Ferguson, Nolan Gould, Sarah Hyland, Jeremy Maguire, Ed O'Neill, Rico Rodriguez, Eric Stonestreet, Sofía Vergara, Ariel Winter
2016 (23rd)	Veep	Dan Bakkedahl, Sufe Bradshaw, Anna Chlumsky, Gary Cole, Kevin Dunn, Clea DuVall, Nelson Franklin, Tony Hale, Hugh Laurie, Julia Louis-Dreyfus, Sam Richardson, Reid Scott, Timothy Simons, John Slattery, Sarah Sutherland, Matt Walsh, Wayne Wilderson
2017 (24th)	Veep	Dan Bakkedahl, Anna Chlumsky, Gary Cole, Margaret Colin, Kevin Dunn, Clea Duvall, Nelson Franklin, Tony Hale, Julia Louis-Dreyfus, Sam Richardson, Paul Scheer, Reid Scott, Timothy Simons, Sarah Sutherland, Matt Walsh
2017 (24th)	Black-ish	Anthony Anderson, Miles Brown, Deon Cole, Laurence Fishburne, Jenifer Lewis, Peter Mackenzie, Marsai Martin, Jeff Meacham, Tracee Ellis Ross, Marcus Scribner, Yara Shahidi
2017 (24th)	Curb Your Enthusiasm	Ted Danson, Larry David, Susie Essman, Jeff Garlin, Cheryl Hines, J. B. Smoove
2017 (24th)	GLOW	Britt Baron, Alison Brie, Kimmy Gatewood, Betty Gilpin, Rebekka Johnson, Chris Lowell, Sunita Mani, Marc Maron, Kate Nash, Sydelle Noel, Marianna Palka, Gayle Rankin, Bashir Salahuddin, Rich Sommer, Kia Stevens, Jackie Tohn, Ellen Wong, Britney Young
2017 (24th)	Orange Is the New Black	Uzo Aduba, Emily Althaus, Danielle Brooks, Rosal Colon, Jackie Cruz, Francesca Curran, Daniella De Jesus, Lea DeLaria, Nick Dillenburg, Asia Kate Dillon, Beth Dover, Kimiko Glenn, Annie Golden, Laura Gómez, Diane Guerrero, Evan Arthur Hall, Michael J. Harney, Brad William Henke, Mike Houston, Vicky Jeudy, Kelly Karbacz, Julie Lake, Selenis Leyva, Natasha Lyonne, Taryn Manning, Adrienne C. Moore, Miriam Morales, Kate Mulgrew, Emma Myles, John Palladino, Matt Peters, Jessica Pimentel, Dascha Polanco, Laura Prepon, Jolene Purdy, Elizabeth Rodriguez, Nick Sandow, Abigail Savage, Taylor Schilling, Constance Shulman, Dale Soules, Yael Stone, Emily Tarver, Michael Torpey, Lin Tucci
2018 (25th)	The Marvelous Mrs. Maisel	Caroline Aaron, Alex Borstein, Rachel Brosnahan, Marin Hinkle, Zachary Levi, Kevin Pollak, Tony Shalhoub, Brian Tarantina, Michael Zegen
2018 (25th)	Atlanta	Khris Davis, Donald Glover, Brian Tyree Henry, Lakeith Stanfield
2018 (25th)	Barry	Darrell Britt-Gibson, D'Arcy Carden, Andy Carey, Anthony Carrigan, Rightor Doyle, Glenn Fleschler, Alejandro Furth, Sarah Goldberg, Bill Hader, Kirby Howell-Baptiste, Paula Newsome, John Pirruccello, Stephen Root, Henry Winkler
2018 (25th)	GLOW	Britt Baron, Shakira Barrera, Alison Brie, Kimmy Gatewood, Betty Gilpin, Rebekka Johnson, Chris Lowell, Sunita Mani, Marc Maron, Kate Nash, Sydelle Noel, Victor Quinaz, Gayle Rankin, Bashir Salahuddin, Kia Stevens, Jackie Tohn, Ellen Wong, Britney Young
2018 (25th)	The Kominsky Method	Jenna Lyng Adams, Alan Arkin, Sarah Baker, Casey Thomas Brown, Michael Douglas, Ashleigh LaThrop, Emily Osment, Graham Rogers, Susan Sullivan, Melissa Tang, Nancy Travis
2019 (26th)	The Marvelous Mrs. Maisel	Caroline Aaron, Alex Borstein, Rachel Brosnahan, Marin Hinkle, Stephanie Hsu, Joel Johnstone, Jane Lynch, Leroy McClain, Kevin Pollak, Tony Shalhoub, Matilda Szydagis, Brian Tarantina, Michael Zegen
2019 (26th)	Barry	Darrell Britt-Gibson, D'Arcy Carden, Andy Carey, Anthony Carrigan, Rightor Doyle, Alejandro Furth, Sarah Goldberg, Bill Hader, Kirby Howell-Baptiste, John Pirruccello, Stephen Root, Henry Winkler, Nikita Bogolyubov, Troy Caylak, Patricia Fa'Asua, Nick Gracer, Michael Irby
2019 (26th)	Fleabag	Sian Clifford, Olivia Colman, Brett Gelman, Bill Paterson, Andrew Scott, Phoebe Waller-Bridge
2019 (26th)	The Kominsky Method	Jenna Lyng Adams, Alan Arkin, Sarah Baker, Casey Thomas Brown, Michael Douglas, Graham Rogers, Melissa Tang, Nancy Travis, Lisa Edelstein, Paul Reiser, Jane Seymour
2019 (26th)	Schitt's Creek	Chris Elliott, Emily Hampshire, Daniel Levy, Eugene Levy, Sarah Levy, Dustin Milligan, Annie Murphy, Catherine O'Hara, Noah Reid, Jennifer Robertson, Karen Robinson

=== 2020s ===
Year	Series	Cast members
2020 (27th)	Schitt's Creek	Chris Elliott, Emily Hampshire, Dan Levy, Eugene Levy, Sarah Levy, Annie Murphy, Catherine O'Hara, Noah Reid, Jennifer Robertson, Karen Robinson
2020 (27th)	Dead to Me	Christina Applegate, Linda Cardellini, Max Jenkins, James Marsden, Sam McCarthy, Natalie Morales, Diana Maria Riva, Luke Roessler
2020 (27th)	The Flight Attendant	Kaley Cuoco, Merle Dandridge, Nolan Gerard Funk, Michelle Gomez, Michiel Huisman, Yasha Jackson, Jason Jones, T.R. Knight, Zosia Mamet, Audrey Grace Marshall, Griffin Matthews, Rosie Perez, Terry Serpico, Colin Woodell
2020 (27th)	The Great	Belinda Bromilow, Sebastian de Souza, Sacha Dhawan, Elle Fanning, Phoebe Fox, Bayo Gbadamosi, Adam Godley, Douglas Hodge, Nicholas Hoult, Louis Hynes, Florence Keith-Roach, Gwilym Lee, Danusia Samal, Charity Wakefield
2020 (27th)	Ted Lasso	Annette Badland, Phil Dunster, Brett Goldstein, Brendan Hunt, Toheeb Jimoh, James Lance, Nick Mohammed, Jason Sudeikis, Jeremy Swift, Juno Temple, Hannah Waddingham
2021 (28th)	Ted Lasso	Annette Badland, Kola Bokinni, Phil Dunster, Cristo Fernández, Brett Goldstein, Brendan Hunt, Toheeb Jimoh, Nick Mohammed, Sarah Niles, Jason Sudeikis, Jeremy Swift, Juno Temple, and Hannah Waddingham
2021 (28th)	The Great	Julian Barratt, Belinda Bromilow, Sacha Dhawan, Elle Fanning, Phoebe Fox, Bayo Gbadamosi, Adam Godley, Douglas Hodge, Nicholas Hoult, Florence Keith-Roach, Gwilym Lee, and Charity Wakefield
2021 (28th)	Hacks	Rose Abdoo, Carl Clemons-Hopkins, Paul W. Downs, Hannah Einbinder, Mark Indelicato, Poppy Liu, Christopher McDonald, Jean Smart, and Megan Stalter
2021 (28th)	The Kominsky Method	Jenna Lyng Adams, Sarah Baker, Casey Thomas Brown, Michael Douglas, Lisa Edelstein, Ashleigh LaThrop, Emily Osment, Haley Joel Osment, Paul Reiser, Graham Rogers, Melissa Tang, and Kathleen Turner
2021 (28th)	Only Murders in the Building	Aaron Dominguez, Selena Gomez, Jackie Hoffman, Jayne Houdyshell, Steve Martin, Amy Ryan, and Martin Short
2022 (29th)	Abbott Elementary	Quinta Brunson, William Stanford Davis, Janelle James, Chris Perfetti, Sheryl Lee Ralph, Lisa Ann Walter, and Tyler James Williams
2022 (29th)	Barry	Sarah Burns, D'Arcy Carden, Anthony Carrigan, Turhan Troy Caylak, Sarah Goldberg, Nick Gracer, Bill Hader, Jessy Hodges, Michael Irby, Gary Kraus, Stephen Root, and Henry Winkler
2022 (29th)	The Bear	Lionel Boyce, Liza Colón-Zayas, Ayo Edebiri, Abby Elliott, Edwin Lee Gibson, Corey Hendrix, Matty Matheson, Ebon Moss-Bachrach, and Jeremy Allen White
2022 (29th)	Hacks	Carl Clemons-Hopkins, Paul W. Downs, Hannah Einbinder, Mark Indelicato, Jean Smart, and Megan Stalter
2022 (29th)	Only Murders in the Building	Michael Cyril Creighton, Cara Delevingne, Selena Gomez, Jayne Houdyshell, Steve Martin, Martin Short, and Adina Verson
2023 (30th)	The Bear	Lionel Boyce, Jose Cervantes Jr., Liza Colón-Zayas, Ayo Edebiri, Abby Elliott, Richard Esteras, Edwin Lee Gibson, Molly Gordon, Corey Hendrix, Matty Matheson, Ebon Moss-Bachrach, Oliver Platt, and Jeremy Allen White
2023 (30th)	Abbott Elementary	Quinta Brunson, William Stanford Davis, Janelle James, Chris Perfetti, Sheryl Lee Ralph, Lisa Ann Walter, and Tyler James Williams
2023 (30th)	Barry	Anthony Carrigan, Sarah Goldberg, Zachary Golinger, Bill Hader, Andre Hyland, Fred Melamed, Charles Parnell, Stephen Root, Tobie Windham, Henry Winkler, and Robert Wisdom
2023 (30th)	Only Murders in the Building	Gerald Caesar, Michael Cyril Creighton, Linda Emond, Selena Gomez, Allison Guinn, Steve Martin, Ashley Park, Don Darryl Rivera, Paul Rudd, Jeremy Shamos, Martin Short, Meryl Streep, Wesley Taylor, Jason Veasey, and Jesse Williams
2023 (30th)	Ted Lasso	Annette Badland, Kola Bokinni, Edyta Budnik, Adam Colborne, Phil Dunster, Cristo Fernández, Kevin "KG" Garry, Brett Goldstein, Billy Harris, Anthony Head, Brendan Hunt, Toheeb Jimoh, James Lance, Nick Mohammed, Jason Sudeikis, Jeremy Swift, Juno Temple, Hannah Waddingham, Bronson Webb, and Katy Wix
2024 (31st)	Only Murders in the Building	Michael Cyril Creighton, Zach Galifianakis, Selena Gomez, Richard Kind, Eugene Levy, Eva Longoria, Steve Martin, Kumail Nanjiani, Molly Shannon, and Martin Short
2024 (31st)	Abbott Elementary	Quinta Brunson, William Stanford Davis, Janelle James, Chris Perfetti, Sheryl Lee Ralph, Lisa Ann Walter, and Tyler James Williams
2024 (31st)	The Bear	Lionel Boyce, Liza Colón-Zayas, Ayo Edebiri, Abby Elliott, Edwin Lee Gibson, Corey Hendrix, Matty Matheson, Ebon Moss-Bachrach, Ricky Staffieri, and Jeremy Allen White
2024 (31st)	Hacks	Rose Abdoo, Carl Clemons-Hopkins, Paul W. Downs, Hannah Einbinder, Mark Indelicato, Jean Smart, and Megan Stalter
2024 (31st)	Shrinking	Harrison Ford, Brett Goldstein, Devin Kawaoka, Gavin Lewis, Wendie Malick, Lukita Maxwell, Ted McGinley, Christa Miller, Jason Segel, Rachel Stubington, Luke Tennie, Michael Urie, and Jessica Williams
2025 (32nd)	The Studio	Ike Barinholtz, Kathryn Hahn, Catherine O'Hara, Seth Rogen, and Chase Sui Wonders
2025 (32nd)	Abbott Elementary	Quinta Brunson, William Stanford Davis, Janelle James, Chris Perfetti, Sheryl Lee Ralph, Lisa Ann Walter, and Tyler James Williams
2025 (32nd)	The Bear	Lionel Boyce, Liza Colón-Zayas, Ayo Edebiri, Abby Elliott, Edwin Lee Gibson, Corey Hendrix, Andrew Lopez, Matty Matheson, Ebon Moss-Bachrach, Oliver Platt, Sarah Ramos, Ricky Staffieri, and Jeremy Allen White
2025 (32nd)	Hacks	Rose Abdoo, Dan Bucatinsky, Carl Clemons-Hopkins, Paul W. Downs, Hannah Einbinder, Mark Indelicato, Jean Smart, Megan Stalter, and Michaela Watkins
2025 (32nd)	Only Murders in the Building	Michael Cyril Creighton, Beanie Feldstein, Jermaine Fowler, Selena Gomez, Jackie Hoffman, Steve Martin, Martin Short, and Dianne Wiest

== Multiple awards ==
4 awards

- Modern Family (consecutive)

3 awards

- Orange Is the New Black (consecutive)
- Seinfeld (2 consecutive)

2 awards

- Desperate Housewives (consecutive)
- The Marvelous Mrs. Maisel (consecutive)
- The Office (consecutive)
- Sex and the City

== Multiple nominations ==
10 nominations

- Frasier

8 nominations

- Modern Family

7 nominations

- 30 Rock
- Everybody Loves Raymond
- Friends
- The Office

6 nominations

- The Big Bang Theory

5 nominations

- Desperate Housewives
- Only Murders in the Building
- Sex and the City
- Veep
- Will & Grace

4 nominations

- Abbott Elementary
- Ally McBeal
- Barry
- The Bear
- Glee
- Hacks
- Mad About You
- Orange Is the New Black
- Seinfeld

3 nominations

- 3rd Rock from the Sun
- Arrested Development
- Curb Your Enthusiasm
- Entourage
- The Kominsky Method
- Ted Lasso

2 nominations

- Black-ish
- GLOW
- The Great
- The Marvelous Mrs. Maisel
- Schitt's Creek
- Ugly Betty
- Weeds

== See also ==
- Primetime Emmy Award for Outstanding Comedy Series
- Golden Globe Award for Best Television Series – Musical or Comedy
- Critics' Choice Television Award for Best Comedy Series
