= Ron Jaffe =

American photographer

Ron Jaffe is an American photographer. He has photographed six U.S. presidents, legislators, dignitaries and well-known celebrities in the fields of entertainment and sports.

== Early life ==
Jaffe was born and raised in Alabama. He moved to Los Angeles at the age of 18 to attend Pasadena City College with the goal of becoming a teacher. Jaffe became interested in photography when he accompanied a fellow student on a photography assignment. The experience exposed Jaffe to a field he had never considered, and he began to pursue his new interest enthusiastically. He continued his coursework and became a teacher with the Pasadena Unified School District, but after a few years, decided to pursue photography professionally.

== Career ==
By the early 1970s, Jaffe was working full-time as a freelance photographer. He shot fashion and commercial photography for his primary clients, which included the designers Barco of California, Jag Swimwear, and DeWeiss. In 1974, Jaffe also began teaching photography at the university level as professor of photography at Chapman College – World Campus Afloat, aboard a ship travelling to South America, Africa, and Europe.

In 1977, Jaffe signed a contract with Elson Alexandre where over the next two decades he photographed more than 37,000 formal and casual portraits of corporate executives, doctors, attorneys, judges and family photos of the company's clients. During this period Jaffe also shot many celebrity portraits on an independent contractor basis capturing unique images of cowboy stars from Dale Robertson, and Gene Autry to Chuck Connors, Indian Iron Eyes Cody and Roy Rogers.

He also worked for the Richard Nixon Library and Birthplace, documenting power visits throughout Nixon's final eight years of his life. After Nixon's death, Ron worked for the library for another six years as a staff photographer and covered meetings with several world leaders at the Nixon library.

For the last 20 years Jaffe has shot over 1000 episodes of high-profile television shows such as Cold Case, CSI Miami, CSI New York, Friends, How I Met Your Mother, Mad Men, Rules of Engagement, Suddenly Susan, The West Wing, and Without a Trace, Castle, CSI: Crime Scene Investigation, Hit the Floor, Jane the Virgin, NCIS, and Scorpion and current shows including The Neighborhood, Grown-ish, NCIS: Los Angeles, and SEAL Team. His work on episodic crime dramas involve not only shooting the show during taping, but all props, photos used in the storyline and all crime scene photos showing the circumstances of crime scene investigation for evidence. In essence, Jaffe actually becomes the forensic photographer of episodic dramas.

In all, Jaffe has shot programs that have aired or are currently airing on the ABC, NBC, CBS, FOX, AMC, VH1, MTV, A&E, The CW, and CMT networks. Because of his work on these shows Jaffe has been nominated twice for the Publicists Guild of America's Excellence in Stills Photography Award.

== Major works ==
=== Camera and electrical department ===
TV series/film	Year	Work type	Details
SEAL Team	2018–2022	Still photographer	18 episodes
NCIS: Los Angeles	2009–2022	Still photographer	115 episodes
Grown-ish	2020–2022	Additional camera; additional photograph	10 episodes; 1 episode
Shining Vale	2022	Additional photography	
The Talk	2013–2022	Still photographer	25 episodes
Ghosts	2021	Still photographer (uncredited)	1 episode
The Neighborhood	2019–2020	Still photographer	9 episodes
Lucifer	2017–2019	Still photographer	7 episodes
Lethal Weapon	2018	Still photographer	5 episodes
Jane the Virgin	2014–2017	Still photographer	58 episodes
Agents of S.H.I.E.L.D.	2013–2016	Still photographer	6 episodes
Castle	2011–2016	Still photographer	104 episodes
The Big Bang Theory	2006–2009	Still photographer	3 episodes
Friends	2000–2004	Still photographer	32 episodes
Minx	2022	Additional photography	10 episodes
CSI: Vegas	2021–2022	Additional photography	15 episodes
The West Wing	2001–2006	Additional photography	21 episodes
How I Met Your Mother	2005–2014	Still photography	97 episodes

{ABBOTT ELEMENTARY}}

2026 
Portrait Photography/Prop Dept
1 episodes

== Awards and honors ==
- California Museum of Science and Industry Certificate of Achievement for Outstanding Photographer in the documentary category (1974)
- 1975 Photographer West Award
- Black & White Spider Award nominee (2005)
- Certificate of Achievement in Recognition of Outstanding Photography Judges Choice award for Los Angeles Advertising Photographers of America (2006)
- Honorary Color Master Fine Art (2007)
- Photojournalism Photography Masters Cup (2008)
- International Publicist Guild – nomination for Excellence in Stills Photography award (2008 and 2010)
- Second International Color Awards (2013)
- 15th Annual Black and White Spider Awards Nominee in Nude 2020
- 11th International Color Awards Nominee in People and Sports 2018
- 16th Black and White Spider Awards Nominee in Photojournalism 2021
- Black & White International Spider Awards Nominee in Advertising Frightfully Sexy 2022
- Black & White International Spider Awards Nominee in Nude Vampires 2022
