= Here and Now (2018 film) =

- Theatrical release poster
- Directed by: Fabien Constant
- Written by: Laura Eason
- Produced by: Alison Benson Andrea Iervolino Sarah Jessica Parker Monika Barcadi
- Starring: Sarah Jessica Parker Simon Baker Common Taylor Kinney Waleed Zuaiter Jacqueline Bisset Renée Zellweger
- Cinematography: Javier Aguirresarobe
- Edited by: Malcolm Jamieson
- Music by: Amie Doherty
- Production companies: AMBI Group; Big Indie Pictures; Pretty Match Productions
- Distributed by: AMBI Distribution
- Release dates: April 19, 2018 (Tribeca Film Festival); November 9, 2018 (United States)
- Running time: 91 minutes
- Country: United States
- Language: English
- Box office: $13,892

Here and Now (originally titled Best Day of My Life and later Blue Night) is a 2018 American romantic drama film directed by Fabien Constant, starring Sarah Jessica Parker and Simon Baker. It has been described as an homage to the 1962 Agnès Varda film Cléo from 5 to 7. The film was shot in 16 days in New York City, and follows Vivienne (Parker), a singer who is diagnosed with a glioblastoma.

It had its world premiere at the Tribeca Film Festival on April 19, 2018. It was released in the United States on November 9, 2018, by AMBI Distribution and Paramount Pictures.

== Plot ==
The film starts with a close-up of Vivienne's (Sarah Jessica Parker) trembling blue eyes. Vivienne receives a call from her manager, Ben (Common), that she is late for a rehearsal. Afterwards, Vivienne finds out from her doctor, Dr. Marianne Holt (Mary Beth Peil), that she has a terminal brain tumor. After the visit with Dr. Holt, Vivienne walks aimlessly around New York City. She receives multiple phone calls from her mother, Jeanne (Jacqueline Bisset). Vivienne finally reaches the studio and is greeted by Ben. He informs her that she has an interview right after the rehearsal. As she approaches her bandmates, she apologizes for being late. She begins hugging everyone else except the drummer, Jordan (Taylor Kinney). After the rehearsal, Jordan asks Vivienne out for coffee and is refused due to the interview. Their fingers linger on his drum set, implying they are in a romantic relationship. Afterward, Vivienne goes up to the second floor with Jordan. They begin making out passionately.

Afterwards, Vivienne continues to wander around aimlessly as she makes her way to the interview. She passes by a clothing store and buys an expensive dress. She then attends the interview but does not seem like she is into the conversation with the interviewer, Oona (Phillipa Soo). After the interview, Vivienne meets Ray (Michael Potts). Their conversation ends with Vivienne rushing off for her Lyft. Throughout her Lyft ride, Sami (Waleed Zuaiter), the Lyft driver, gets into a heated argument over the phone. Vivienne, visibly uncomfortable in her Lyft ride, demands to get off early. She returns home and is greeted by her mother who bombards her with questions. Vivienne becomes increasingly annoyed and replies rudely to Jeanne. Jeanne apologizes to her and leaves the kitchen. After drinking a glass of wine, Vivienne locks herself in her room, sees a picture of her daughter, Lucie (Gus Birney), and starts crying. She realizes what she has done to her mother and goes out to apologize and hug her. Subsequently, she recalls that she has left her dress in her Lyft and calls Sami to retrieve it. Sami arrives outside Vivienne's house to return her dress. As he is about to drive off, Vivienne halts him and asks if she can catch a ride. Sami rejects her request and drives off.

Vivienne arrives at her ex, Nick's (Simon Baker), house unannounced. Nick invites her to dinner and she politely declines. Vivienne decides to leave Nick's house. She bids Nick and Lucie farewell. She continues wandering around aimlessly and has a conversation with an older lady (Venida Evans). Vivienne then calls Ben to arrange a meeting. As she travels to their meeting spot, she happens upon her old friend, Tessa (Renée Zellweger). They have a conversation about their lives before Tessa returns to her birthday party. Vivienne then attends a performance in which Jordan is playing the drums. After the performance, she is invited to sing on stage. Vivienne sings the song "Unfollow the Rules" by Rufus Wainwright. She later has sex with Jordan at his apartment. She gets into a Lyft and meets Sami again, who drives her to Nick's house. Nick is dismayed that Vivienne has once again shown up unannounced. Lucie comes out of her bedroom to see what the commotion is about. Nick excuses himself to allow Vivienne some time with Lucie. In her bedroom, Lucie plays her song to her mother and is met with adoration by Vivienne. Before Lucie falls asleep, Vivienne expresses her regrets about not being there for her. Vivienne kisses Lucie goodnight and goes into the living room to see Nick watching an old French movie. They converse before Nick realizes something is wrong with Vivienne. Nick reprimands her for prioritizing work over what is actually important. Before they conclude their conversation, Nick wants Vivienne to update him about her condition before they decide how to disclose her condition to Lucie. Nick then holds her hand and expresses that he really does care for her and is scared. Vivienne then pulls her hand away from Nick and returns to Lucie's bedroom. She sits down beside Lucie's bed and spends the night shaking and weeping.

The next morning, Vivienne sneaks out of Nick's house. She returns home to pack for her surgery and leaves the house. She takes a Lyft and is chauffeured by Sami once again. While driving, Sami turns around to check out Vivienne, but Vivienne avoids eye contact and takes a nap for the remainder of the Lyft ride. She is later awakened by Sami. Outside the hospital, due to Vivienne's request, both Vivienne and Sami get out of the car for coffee. She begins walking away from Sami. While on the hospital bed, Vivienne removes her jewelry.

== Cast ==
- Sarah Jessica Parker as Vivienne
- Simon Baker as Nick
- Common as Ben
- Taylor Kinney as Jordan
- Waleed Zuaiter as Sami
- Jacqueline Bisset as Jeanne
- Renée Zellweger as Tessa
- Gus Birney as Lucie
- Mary Beth Peil as Dr. Marianne Holt
- Michael Potts as Ray
- Phillipa Soo as Oona
- Venida Evans as Older Woman
- Cliff Moylan as Joey

== Production ==
In July 2017, it was announced that Jacqueline Bisset had joined the cast in the role of Parker's mother. Principal photography started in July 2017 in New York City.

== Release ==
The film had its world premiere at the Tribeca Film Festival on April 19, 2018. Shortly after, AMBI Distribution and Paramount Pictures acquired North American distribution rights to the film, with AMBI distributing theatrically and Paramount Home Media Distribution handling the digital and VOD release, and set the film for a November 9, 2018, release.

== Reception ==
On review aggregator Rotten Tomatoes, the film holds an approval rating of 23% based on 22 reviews, with an average rating of 4/10. On Metacritic, the film has a weighted average score of 45 out of 100, based on ten critics, indicating "mixed or average" reviews.

Peter Debruge of Variety found that "Constant can't decide whether Vivienne is keeping her emotions buried deep inside or wearing them on her sleeve, and because Parker plays it somewhere in between, we rely on other characters to elucidate the situation." Rex Reed of The Observer similarly found the film "Bleak and paced with the energy of drops of water from a plumbing leak, Here and Now is deliberately slow, hoping to provide viewers a chance to share the torturous mental anguish Vivienne is going through. The process only succeeds in boring us to death. This is no fault of Parker, who also produced the film, but of Fabien Constant, an inexperienced film director best known for TV commercials, who is making his feature-film debut."

The film, widely considered an homage to Cléo from 5 to 7 (1962), was negatively compared to the original. David Erhlich of IndieWire felt that "for an homage boasting a far more fatal outlook than Varda's original, it's frustrating and kind of perverse that Blue Night [Here and Now] should be so gentle. 'I'm not done yet,' Vivienne declares. But we never even see her get started." Erhlich also found that "a chance run-in with an estranged friend (Renée Zellweger, in a very welcome cameo) leaves all sorts of meat on the table, minutes of screen time wasted on the vague understanding that growing older requires people to tighten their emotional bandwidth." In a mixed review, Dana Schwartz of Entertainment Weekly found that "the premise—an homage to the 1962 Agnès Varda film Cléo From 5 to 7—works in spurts" while praising the appearance of Zellweger, describing the film as "heightened by the magnetic Renée Zellweger, barely concealing her suburban rage behind a cheerfully swirled glass of wine." Overall she felt, however, "for most of the film, Parker's Vivienne is bland and forgettable."
