= The Crossing (TV series) =

2018 American television series

- Genre: Science fiction; Drama
- Created by: Jay Beattie; Dan Dworkin
- Starring: Steve Zahn; Natalie Martinez; Sandrine Holt; Tommy Bastow; Rob Campbell; Rick Gomez; Marcuis W. Harris; Grant Harvey; Jay Karnes; Simone Kessell; Kelley Missal; Luc Roderique; Bailey Skodje; Georgina Haig
- Composer: Robert Duncan
- Country of origin: United States
- Original language: English
- No. of seasons: 1
- No. of episodes: 11

Production
- Executive producers: Matt Olmstead; Jason T. Reed; Jay Beattie; Dan Dworkin; David Von Ancken
- Running time: 42 minutes
- Production companies: Dworkin/Beattie; Brick Moon; ABC Studios

Original release
- Network: ABC
- Release: April 2 – June 9, 2018

The Crossing is an American science fiction drama series that aired on ABC. The series debuted on April 2, 2018, and aired its final episode on June 9, 2018. On March 19, 2018, ABC released the pilot episode on their website. The series was filmed in British Columbia, Canada. On May 11, 2018, ABC cancelled the show after one season. The showrunners wrote the first season as a self-contained story, and thus were able to bring it to something of a conclusion.

== Premise ==
Refugees fleeing a war seek asylum in an American town—but they claim to be from America, 180 years in the future. Moreover, at least one of the refugees exhibits apparently superhuman powers that may make her a threat.

== Cast ==
- Steve Zahn as Sheriff Jude Ellis
- Natalie Martinez as Reece
- Sandrine Holt as Agent Emma Ren
- Tommy Bastow as Marshall
- Rob Campbell as Paul
- Rick Gomez as Nestor Rosario
- Grant Harvey as Roy Aronson
- Jay Karnes as Craig Lindauer
- Simone Kessell as Rebecca
- Kelley Missal as Hannah
- Luc Roderique as Bryce Foster
- Bailey Skodje as Leah
- Georgina Haig as Dr. Sophie Forbin

== Production ==
Set in the fictional town of Port Canaan, Oregon and in Seattle, the series was filmed in coastal areas of British Columbia and in the city of Vancouver in 2017. The beach where the refugees arrive is near Ucluelet on Vancouver Island while the sheriff's office and some other locations were filmed in and around the village of Britannia Beach, north of Vancouver. The Oceanic Plaza in Vancouver was the setting for the Seattle offices of the show's Homeland Security and other scenes were filmed in and around the city. Additional shooting locations in BC were in Steveston, British Columbia and in New Westminster. The first camp footage was filmed at Camp McLean. Filming in Vancouver started in July and wrapped in late-November 2017.

On May 11, 2018, ABC canceled the show after one season. Having written the first season as a self-contained story, the showrunners were able to bring it to something of a conclusion.

== Episodes ==
No.	Title	Directed by	Written by	Original release date	U.S. viewers (millions)
1	"Pilot"	Rob Bowman	Dan Dworkin & Jay Beattie	April 2, 2018 (Note: The first episode was released online on March 19, 2018.)	5.40
People awaken underwater in the ocean near Port Canaan, Oregon. Most drown, but 47 survivors wash ashore and are interned. Another, Reece, is picked up by commercial fishermen. Local Sheriff Jude Ellis is the first on the scene, but is soon pushed aside by HSI Agent Emma Ren of the Department of Homeland Security. The survivors all claim to have fled from 180 years in the future. Apex, a race of more evolved humans with extraordinary abilities, took over and began exterminating normal humans. Reece seeks out Jude to try to find her daughter Leah, but events reveal that she is an Apex. A survivor named Thomas insists on meeting Emma's superior, Craig Lindauer, a Homeland Security deputy undersecretary, claiming they are not the first group to come from the future, and is horrified when he recognizes Lindauer as one of them.
2	"A Shadow Out of Time"	David Von Ancken	Dan Dworkin & Jay Beattie	April 9, 2018	4.48
In a flash-forward to the year 2187, Apex agent Reece finds Leah, an orphaned normal human baby, and secretly raises her. When this is finally discovered, Reece shoots her superiors and flees. In the present day, Jude tries to arrange a peaceful meeting between Reece and Emma, but Emma informs Lindauer, who instead dispatches a heavily armed team to capture Reece. She is shot, but escapes. Meanwhile, Leah shows symptoms of the incurable disease engineered by Apex to wipe out the rest of humanity.
3	"Pax Americana"	Ken Girotti	Michael Narducci	April 16, 2018	4.09
A wounded Reece neutralizes her pursuers, then kidnaps Jude's son Oliver. Survivor Hannah sneaks out of the guarded refugee camp and meets Marshall, a troubled young man, in Port Canaan. Somehow, Marshall's photo is in Hannah’s now-lost locket. Lindauer assigns virologist Dr. Sophie Forbin to study Leah's disease. Meanwhile, Emma discovers unsettling information which makes her question Lindauer's motives.
4	"The Face of Oblivion"	Tara Nicole Weyr	Evan Bleiweiss	April 23, 2018	4.08
After Reece offers to trade Oliver for Leah, Jude reaches out to Emma, but Leah is very ill and in quarantine. Sophie volunteers to explain the situation to Reece. Meanwhile, Hannah's secret past comes to light; she was forced to collaborate with Apex. Survivor Paul wants to try to locate his wife, part of the earlier migration. When Emma visits the woman, she discovers something that costs her her life.
5	"Ten Years Gone"	Jeffrey Hunt	Rebecca Sonnenshine	April 30, 2018	3.62
Flashbacks reveal that the coming of the "First Arrivals" inadvertently caused a car accident that killed Marshall's mother. The earlier time travelers tried to change history and prevent Apex from coming into existence by secretly assassinating 27 key people. However, the appearance of the second group shows they failed. Their leader, Paul's wife, decides much more drastic measures are needed. Jude investigates Emma's mysterious disappearance, and Sophie risks her career to save Leah's life.
6	"LKA"	Hanelle M. Culpepper	Vivian Tse	May 7, 2018	3.67
Jude seeks assistance from a former colleague in Oakland. He receives information that makes him suspicious of Lindauer. Minutes later, Lindauer calls and offers to meet privately with him. Lindauer fires Sophie, derailing her plan to reunite Reece with Leah. She later blacks out and wakes up very ill in a hospital bed. Survivor Caleb sends photographs of the situation at the camp to Marshall, who uploads them to conspiracy websites. Jude arrests Lindauer as he is on his way to the rendezvous.
7	"Some Dreamers of the Golden Dream"	Alrick Riley	Deirdre Mangan	May 14, 2018	3.53
Mayor Vanessa Conway pressures Jude into releasing Lindauer. When Jude tells her about the refugees, Lindauer agrees to let them spend a day in town, under supervision. Leah and Hannah are among the first group given the privilege. To Roy's dismay, Hannah spends the day with Marshall. Anticipating Reece will come for her child, Jude removes Leah's tracking bracelet. However, there is a second tracker hidden inside Leah's doll, and Reece is captured. At the camp, a woman finally regains consciousness; she covers the walls of her cabin with Apex writing.
8	"The Long Morrow"	David Boyd	Sabir Pirzada	May 28, 2018	2.53
Emma's body is found on the camp grounds. When the murder weapon is found among Paul's possessions, he is taken into custody, but that is just a ploy to reunite him with his wife. She gets him to make a video supporting the story that he and the others are members of a cult who tried to commit mass suicide. Lindauer rehires Sophie to do research using the captive Reece. Naomi, the formerly comatose woman, believes she is a prophet, and gains her first convert in Rebecca, Caleb's wife, who is still grieving over the loss of their daughter Rachel, taken by Apex because of some special ability.
9	"Hope Smiles from the Threshold"	P. J. Pesce	Matt Olmstead	June 4, 2018	2.92
The First Arrivals' attempts to maintain their secrecy begin to unravel. Jude questions a woman who was picked up near the camp and has no identification; she eventually admits that she is Diana, one of the key people who operated the time machine and the one who sent the First Arrivals. She washed ashore far enough away that she escaped the initial roundup. She identifies Lindauer and Eve, Paul's wife, as First Arrivals. Meanwhile, Paul warns Jude by telephone that the refugees may be in mortal danger. Naomi tries to recruit Agent Foster, but when that fails, suborns another agent into helping her and five converts, including Rebecca, escape. The agent shoots Foster when he tries to stop them. Lindauer is revealed to have a daughter named Rachel who, like Naomi, bears a brand signifying she was an Apex slave.
10	"The Androcles Option"	Alex Zakrzewski	Michael Narducci & Rebecca Sonnenshine	June 9, 2018	2.09
After Foster's death, Lindauer is ordered to move everyone at the camp to high-security detention facilities. Eve plans to kill them all first with a toxin, under the guise of an inoculation. Leah is returned to the camp. Marshall gets himself arrested to pass a message via Roy to Caleb: he needs to prepare the refugees to escape. Eve introduces Paul to their ten-year-old son Aaron, with whom Eve was pregnant when Eve left. Eve then kills Paul with the toxin for calling Jude. Questioning Caleb about Rebecca's involvement with Naomi, Lindauer realizes that Lindauer’s daughter is Caleb and Rebecca's child. When Diana finds out her wife Grace escaped with Naomi, she departs to search for her but first completes a device they need to cover the refugees' tracks. Reece frees herself before Sophie and Jude arrive to rescue her. Reece later destroys what she thinks is Sophie's Apex-derived possible cure, but Sophie, with only days to live, later takes it, risking a 93% chance of death, and passes out.
11	"These are the Names"	David Von Ancken	Dan Dworkin & Jay Beattie	June 9, 2018	2.10
Nestor gets Marshall released, at the same time helping Reece sneak into the camp to disable the guards. That night, Roy turns off the power to the electrified fence, but is caught by Doyle, the First Arrivals' resident killer and Lindauer's FBI liaison. The prisoners escape, but Jude is caught bringing Diana's device into the camp. Horrified that Eve has become as ruthless as Apex, Lindauer kills Doyle and lets Jude and Roy go, then goes into hiding himself. Diana's device destroys all electronic records of the refugees. Two weeks later, Jude denies knowing anything to a governmental investigating task force. Jude also supplies the escapees with false identities. Caleb reunites with Rachel, now a university student. Before leaving, Leah tells Jude that Jude’s surname was written repeatedly on Naomi's cabin walls. Eve sends someone to kill Sophie, but she awakens with Apex capabilities and kills the assassin, then leaves the hospital.

== Reception ==
=== Critical response ===
On the review aggregator website Rotten Tomatoes, the series has an approval rating of 60% based on 20 reviews, with an average rating of 5.79/10. The website's critics consensus reads, "Though somewhat derivative and overstuffed, The Crossing offers up just enough decent twists to draw intrigue." Metacritic, which uses a weighted average, assigned a score of 59 out of 100 based on 12 critics, indicating "mixed or average reviews".

=== Ratings ===
Viewership and ratings per episode of The Crossing
No.	Title	Air date	Rating/share (18–49)	Viewers (millions)	DVR (18–49)	DVR viewers (millions)	Total (18–49)	Total viewers (millions)
1	"Pilot"	April 2, 2018	0.9/3	5.40	0.7	2.97	1.6	8.37
2	"A Shadow Out of Time"	April 9, 2018	0.8/3	4.48	0.6	2.80	1.4	7.28
3	"Pax Americana"	April 16, 2018	0.7/3	4.09	—N/a	2.31	—N/a	6.40
4	"The Face of Oblivion"	April 23, 2018	0.7/3	4.08	—N/a	2.07	—N/a	6.16
5	"Ten Years Gone"	April 30, 2018	0.5/2	3.62	0.5	2.10	1.0	5.72
6	"LKA"	May 7, 2018	0.5/2	3.67	0.4	—N/a	0.9	—N/a
7	"Some Dreamers of the Golden Dream"	May 14, 2018	0.5/2	3.53	0.4	1.85	0.9	5.38
8	"The Long Morrow"	May 28, 2018	0.4/2	2.53	—N/a	—N/a	—N/a	—N/a
9	"Hope Smiles from the Threshold"	June 4, 2018	0.6/3	2.92	0.4	1.87	1.0	4.79
10	"The Androcles Option"	June 9, 2018	0.3/1	2.09	0.3	1.45	0.6	3.54
11	"These are the Names"	June 9, 2018	0.3/1	2.10	0.3	1.56	0.6	3.66

== See also ==
- The 4400 and 4400 - A ball of light deposits a group of 4400 people who vanished without a trace over the last century, having not aged a single day and with no memory of what happened to them.
- The Refugees - Three billion people from the future have traveled to the present to escape from an imminent global disaster.
- Beforeigners - A "time migration" occurs all over the world, with people from the Stone Age, Viking Age, and the 19th century. Set in Oslo.
