= Billy Boy (2017 film) =

- Film poster
- Directed by: Bradley Buecker
- Written by: Blake Jenner
- Produced by: Bradley Buecker; Blake Jenner; Mike Jenner; Cooper Ulrich; Robert J. Ulrich
- Starring: Blake Jenner; Melissa Benoist; Greg Germann; Melissa Bolona; Jim Beaver; Grant Harvey; Aramis Knight
- Cinematography: Joaquin Sedillo
- Edited by: Bradley Buecker
- Music by: James S. Levine
- Production companies: Fiction Pictures; Stay Relevant Productions; Seasick Pictures
- Distributed by: Gravitas Ventures
- Release dates: September 23, 2017 (Fantastic Fest); June 15, 2018 (United States)
- Running time: 90 minutes
- Country: United States
- Language: English

Billy Boy (previously Juvenile) is a 2017 American drama film directed by Bradley Buecker and written by Blake Jenner. The film stars Jenner, Melissa Benoist, Greg Germann, Melissa Bolona, Jim Beaver, Grant Harvey, and Aramis Knight. Billy Boy premiered at the Fantastic Fest on September 23, 2017, before a simultaneous release by Gravitas Ventures on June 15, 2018.

== Plot ==
Troublemaker Billy Forsetti falls for the beautiful Jennifer. But when a carjacking takes a turn for the worse, Billy finds himself in for trouble.

== Cast ==
- Blake Jenner as Billy Forsetti
- Melissa Benoist as Jennifer
- Jim Beaver as Crabtree
- Greg Germann as Mr. Langdon
- Andre Royo as Mr. Adams
- Brenda Bakke as Margarette
- Aramis Knight as Carlos
- Melissa Bolona as Jules
- Nick Eversman as Greg Basualdo
- Blaine Saunders as Young Girl
- Grant Harvey as Mikey Valentino
- Cole Bernstein as Miranda
- Derek Mio as Jimmy
- Brad Hunt as Frank
- Jack Foley as Boy

== Release ==
The film premiered at Fantastic Fest on September 23, 2017. It later was shown at the San Diego International Film Festival on October 6, 2017, and the Miami International Film Festival on March 14, 2018. It was scheduled to be released on June 15, 2018.

The film was originally to premiere on March 4, 2017, at the 2017 Miami International Film Festival under its original title Billy Boy. However, it was cancelled later on amid speculation of bad publicity due to Melissa Benoist having recently filed for divorce from co-star and writer Blake Jenner.

== Reception ==
Amelia Emberwing from "Birth Movies Death" gave the film a bad review. She praised its premise but criticized its development. Emberwing also praised the actor's performances but wrote: "At the end of the day, Juvenile is a bad film filled with some exceptional performances. Each actor shines in their role and adds to the tone of the movie. Those performances aren’t enough to salvage questionable editing choices and an empty story direction but do manage to make a bit more of a palatable watch."

Dennis Harvey of Variety Magazine harshly criticized the film for having a "shallow muddle of a screenplay" and said "it's exasperatingly undercooked and arted-up, failing on basic levels of character definition and narrative coherence, too often feeling like a classic indulgence for pretty-boy actors playing tough". He complimented the actors for having talent but summed up his review saying, "This is a film whose theoretical good intentions feel as inorganic as its choppy storytelling".
