= Gus Birney =

American actress (born 1999)

- Born: Augusta Marsh Birney; July 27, 1999 (age 27)
- Other name: Gus Birney
- Occupation: Actress
- Years active: 2012–present
- Parents: Reed Birney (father); Constance Shulman (mother)

Augusta Marsh Birney (born July 27, 1999), known professionally as Gus Birney, is an American actress. She is known for her television roles in The Mist (2017), Dickinson (2019–2021), and Shining Vale (2022–2023). On stage, she made her Broadway debut in the 2023 revival of The Sign in Sidney Brustein's Window. She also acted in off-Broadway productions of The Rose Tattoo (2016) and Our Class (2024).

== Early life ==
Birney is the daughter of actors Reed Birney and Constance Shulman.

== Career ==
Birney made her professional stage debut playing Rosa in the 2016 production of the Tennessee Williams play The Rose Tattoo at the Williamstown Theatre Festival. She acted alongside Marisa Tomei, Christopher Abbott, and Lindsay Mendez. She made her film debut in the romantic comedy Here and Now (2018) starring Sarah Jessica Parker. She has since acted in the Charlie Kaufman Netflix psychological drama I'm Thinking of Ending Things (2020), and the Hulu coming-of-age teen comedy Plan B (2021). She took roles in the science fiction-horror series The Mist (2017), the Netflix superhero series Jessica Jones (2019), and the Netflix comedy series Insatiable (2019). She portrayed Jane Humphreys in the Apple TV+ series Dickinson (2019–2020) starring Hailee Steinfeld. From 2022 to 2023, she acted in the Apple TV+ satirical comedy horror series Shining Vale earning a Saturn Award for Best Young Actor in a Television Series nomination.

From February to March in 2023 she acted in the off-Broadway revival of Lorraine Hansberry's The Sign in Sidney Brustein's Window starring opposite Oscar Isaac and Rachel Brosnahan at the Brooklyn Academy of Music. She played a young prostitute, Gloria Parodus, the sister of Iris (Brosnahan). The production made its transfer to Broadway with Birney joining making it her Broadway debut. Birney said of the experience, "Doing Sidney Brustein was one of the most transformative experiences of my life, not only as an actor, but as a human being. Anything after feels almost like, "OK, I know I can do this. I just went through something hard, and I have taught my soul how to handle going to a really dark place." David Gordon of TheatreMania described her performance as being "excellent". The production was nominated for the Tony Award for Best Revival of a Play losing to the revival of Topdog/Underdog.

In 2024, she acted in the adaptation of the Polish playwright Tadeusz Slobodzianek's play Our Class at the Brooklyn Academy of Music. She portrayed Dora, a young Jewish mother, one of 10 Polish students in the time leading up to a 1941 pogrom in the village of Jedwabne. Raven Snook of Time Out described her performance as "heartbreaking".

== Filmography ==
=== Film ===
Year	Title	Role	Notes
2012	Bloody Mary	Victoria	Short film
2018	Here and Now	Lucie	
2018	Whiteboy	Brandy	Short film
2018	Swallow Grass Snakes	Devin	Short film
2019	Afterdeath		Short film
2020	Darcy	Darcy	
2020	I'm Thinking of Ending Things	Tulsey Town Girl 2/Aunt Eller	
2020	The Man in the Woods	Suzie Hall	
2021	Plan B	Megan	
2021	Giving Birth to a Butterfly	Marlene	
2023	Happiness for Beginners	Kaylee	
2023	Asleep in My Palm	Millah	
2023	Three Birthdays	Joyce	

=== Television ===
Year	Title	Role	Notes
2015	Chicago Med	Ashley Cole	Episode: "Mistaken"
2017	The Mist	Alex Copeland	10 episodes
2017	Law & Order: Special Victims Unit	Kristi Martin	Episode: "Unintended Consequences"
2018	Instinct	Nicki	Episode: "Secrets and Lies"
2018	Bull	Penny Spiro	Episode: "Jury Duty"
2019	Jessica Jones	Birdie	Episode: "A.K.A. You're Welcome"
2019	Blue Bloods	Carrie Ross	Episode: "The Real Deal"
2019	Insatiable	Jade	Episode: "Ladybomb"; Episode: "The Most You Can Be"
2019–2021	Dickinson	Jane Humphreys	17 episodes
2020	The Blacklist	Angela Hendrickson	Episode: "Nyle Hatcher"
2022–2023	Shining Vale	Gaynor Phelps	16 episodes
2025	Black Rabbit	Mel Whitney	Miniseries
2025	The Last Frontier	Vivian Pike	Episode: "Blue Skies"; Episode: "American Dream"
2026	Something Very Bad Is Going to Happen	Portia Cunningham	8 episodes

=== Theatre ===
Year	Title	Role	Playwright	Venue	Ref.
2016	The Rose Tattoo	Rosa	Tennessee Williams	Williamstown Theatre Festival	
2016	Connected	Girl Making Out/Jill/Shireen	Lia Romeo	59E59 Theatres, Off-Broadway	
2023	The Sign in Sidney Brustein's Window	Gloria Parodus	Lorraine Hansberry	Brooklyn Academy of Music	
2023	The Sign in Sidney Brustein's Window	Gloria Parodus	Lorraine Hansberry	James Earl Jones Theatre, Broadway	
2023	Paris, ACTORS!	Performer	Hamish Linklater	Reading, Williamstown Theatre Festival	
2024	Our Class	Dora	Tadeusz Slobodzianek	Brooklyn Academy of Music	
2026	Seagull: True Story	Nico	Eli Rarey	The Public Theater	

== Awards and nominations ==
Year	Association	Category	Project Title	Result	Ref.
2022	Saturn Award	Best Young Actor in a Television Series	Shining Vale	Nominated	
2024	Outer Critics Circle Award	Outstanding Featured Performer in an Off-Broadway Play	Our Class	Pending	
