= Rebekka Johnson =

American actress

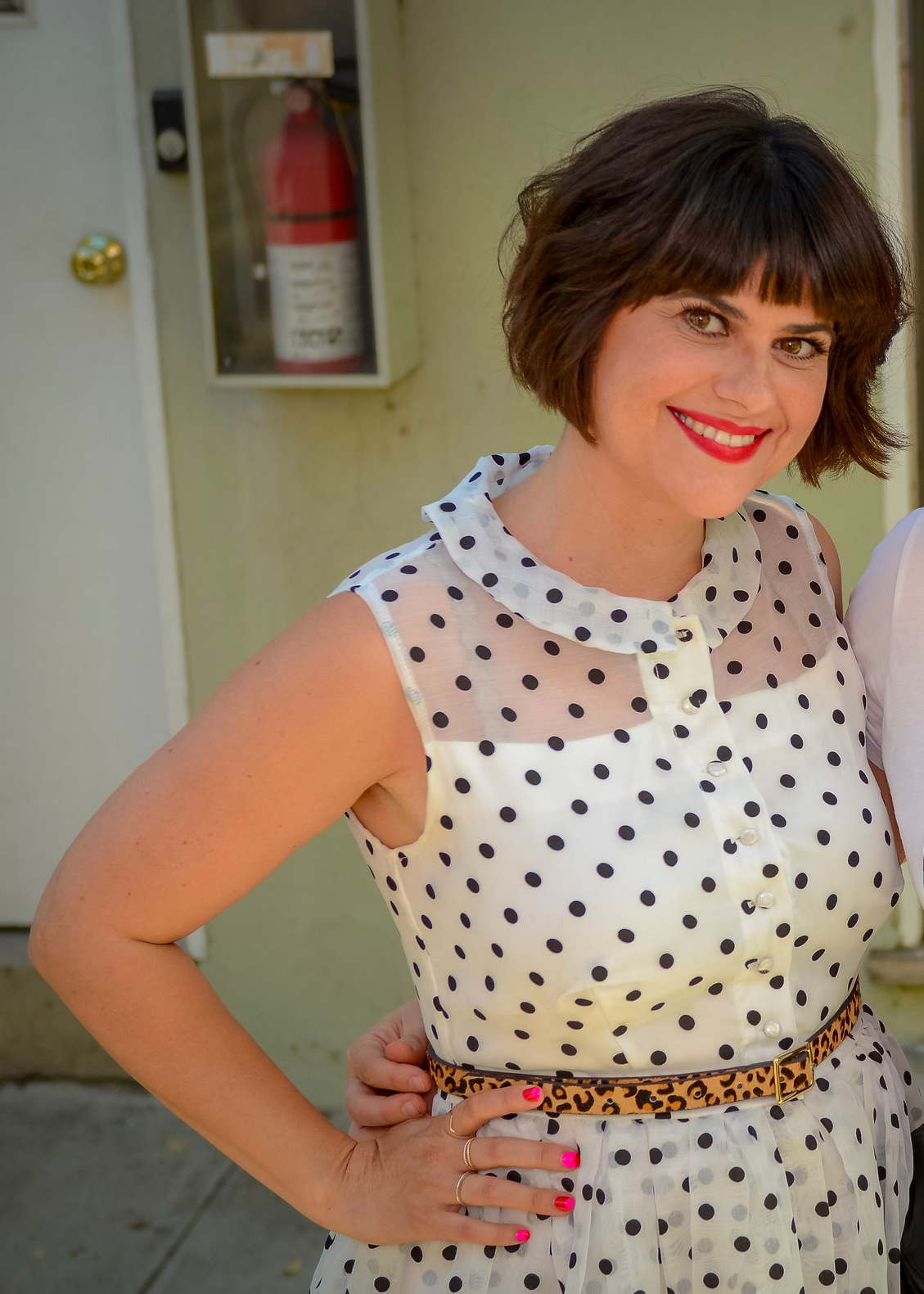
- Johnson on the set of Consent in August 2018
- Born: Staten Island, New York, U.S.
- Education: Montclair State University (BFA)
- Occupations: Actress; comedian; producer; director; singer; composer
- Years active: 2002–present

Rebekka Johnson is an American actress, comedian, writer and producer from Staten Island, New York. Johnson is best known for playing Dawn Rivecca on Netflix's wrestling comedy GLOW. She was featured on MTV's prank show Boiling Points. Johnson has been performing with her musical comedy group The Apple Sisters along with her GLOW co-star Kimmy Gatewood and Sarah Lowe since 2007.

== Early life ==
Johnson is the daughter of Beverly and Frederick Johnson. She graduated from Staten Island Technical High School and Montclair State University, with a bachelor of fine arts degree in acting from the latter.

== The Apple Sisters ==
Johnson is co-creator of The Apple Sisters, a World War II musical comedy trio. The group, which consists of Kimmy Gatewood, Johnson, and Sarah Lowe, started in 2007 in New York City. They received wide acclaim at the 2008 Montreal Just For Laughs Comedy Festival, which lead them to move to Los Angeles where they continually perform.

== Personal life ==
Johnson married Brendan James Gallagher on November 18, 2006, in Big Indian, New York.

== Filmography ==
=== Film ===
Year	Title	Role	Notes
2012	This Is 40	Gyno Nurse	
2013	Jazz Fever	Pregnant Mabel	Short film; also producer
2018	Consent, a Short Comedy About a Serious Subject	Libby	Short film; also writer and producer
2021	Good on Paper	Rhonda Steward	

=== Television ===
Year	Title	Role	Notes
2005	Law & Order: Criminal Intent	Mindy	Episode: "In the Wee Small Hours: Part 1"
2007	Kappa Mikey	Additional voices	Episode: "Back to School"
2010	Ugly Americans	(voice)	3 episodes
2011	Conan	Candy Apple	Episode: "The Fluffer of Seville"
2013	Arrested Development	Check Out	Episode: "Off the Hook"
2016	We Don't Hate It Here	Edie	5 episodes
2017–19	GLOW	Dawn Rivecca	29 episodes
2017	A Christmas Story Live!	Candy Apple	Television special
2018	WWE SmackDown	Herself	Episode: "The Road to WWE Extreme Rules 2018 Begins"
2019	Crazy Ex-Girlfriend	Elated Cat	Episode: "I Need Some Balance"
2019	American Dad!	(voice)	Episode: "I Am the Jeans: The Gina Lavetti Story"
2020	The Baby-Sitters Club	Natalie Barrett	Episode: "Dawn and the Impossible Three"
2021	The Sex Lives of College Girls	Coach Hanson	Episode: "The Surprise Party"
