= Annie Parisse =

American actress (born 1975)

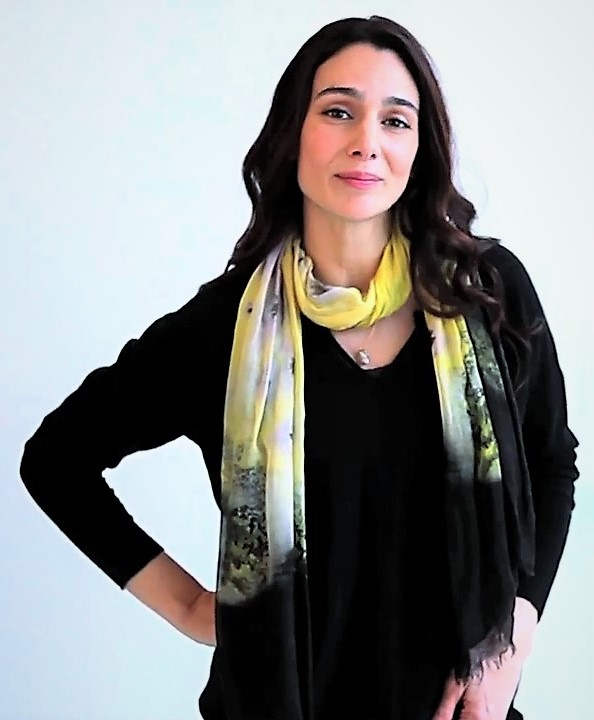
- Parisse in 2015
- Born: Anne Marie Cancelmi; July 31, 1975 (age 51); Anchorage, Alaska, U.S.
- Education: Fordham University
- Occupation: Actress
- Years active: 1993–present
- Spouse: Paul Sparks
- Children: 2

Anne Marie Cancelmi (born July 31, 1975), known professionally as Annie Parisse, is an American actress. She portrayed Alexandra Borgia on the drama series Law & Order. Parisse has also starred as Julia Snyder on the soap opera As the World Turns, for which she was nominated for a Daytime Emmy Award.

== Early life and education ==
Parisse was born in Anchorage, Alaska, the daughter of Annette, a teacher, and Louis G. Cancelmi, a senior executive with Alaska Airlines. She has Italian, Slovak and Syrian ancestry. Her brother Louis is also an actor. Louis is married to Elisabeth Waterston, a daughter of Law & Order veteran and Parisse's co-star Sam Waterston.

Parisse grew up in Mercer Island, Washington, and attended Mercer Island High School.

Parisse moved to New York City when she was 18 to attend Fordham University, where she majored in theater and appeared in numerous productions, including Medea and Antigone, both of which featured her as the lead.

== Career ==
=== Television and film ===
Parisse joined the cast of the CBS soap opera As the World Turns as Julia Snyder from 1998 to 2001 and returned for a few episodes in 2002. She was later nominated for a Daytime Emmy Award for Outstanding Younger Actress in a Drama Series in 2001.

Early in her career, Parisse guest starred on shows such as Big Apple, Third Watch, and Friends. She made a 2002 appearance on Law & Order, playing an exotic dancer in the episode "Attorney Client", where she testified against a defendant (a defense attorney) who plotted the murder of his wife. This made her one of the Law & Order cast members who had a solo appearance prior to securing a sustaining role, along with Jerry Orbach, S. Epatha Merkerson, Michael Imperioli, Milena Govich, and Jeremy Sisto.

In a 2002 supporting role, Parisse portrayed Jeannie Ashcroft in How to Lose a Guy in 10 Days. She also had a minor role in the 2004 action movie National Treasure, playing the role of Agent Dawes. For the 2005 film Monster-in-Law, she held a supporting role.

In 2004, Parisse joined the cast of Law & Order during the middle of season 15 as assistant district attorney Alexandra Borgia; she made her final appearance in the May 17, 2006, season 16 finale, in which her character is murdered.

In the 2010 war drama The Pacific, Parisse took on the role of Marine Sergeant Lena Riggi Basilone, wife of John Basilone, the revered United States Marine Gunnery Sergeant. She had a recurring role on CBS' Person of Interest as Kara Stanton, the former partner of Jim Caviezel's character John Reese. In August 2012, Parisse was cast in a regular role on the Fox series The Following, premiering on January 21, 2013, as an FBI specialist. In 2016, Parisse appeared in the HBO series Vinyl as Andrea Zito, and in 2017, starred in the Netflix series Friends from College as Samantha "Sam" Delmonico. In 2018, she appeared in Paterno opposite Al Pacino.

=== Stage ===
Starting on March 8, 2007, Parisse starred in a revival of Craig Lucas's Prelude to a Kiss, with Alan Tudyk and John Mahoney. In 2008, Parisse reprised her work in an Off Broadway performance as the title role of Becky Shaw. In the summer of 2011, Parisse appeared in the New York Public Theater's Shakespeare in the Park productions of Measure for Measure and All's Well that Ends Well.

== Personal life ==
Parisse is married to actor Paul Sparks. They have a son, Emmett (born 2009), and a daughter, Lydia (born 2014). They live in Manhattan, New York City, New York.

== Filmography ==
=== Film ===
Year	Title	Role	Notes
1999	On the Q.T.	Wendy	
2003	How to Lose a Guy in 10 Days	Jeannie Ashcroft	
2004	Pagans	Elise Ashton	
2004	National Treasure	Agent Dawes	
2005	Monster-in-Law	Morgan	
2005	Prime	Katherine	
2007	Blackbird	Angie	
2008	What Just Happened	"Fiercely" Actress	
2008	Woman in Burka	Annie	Short film
2008	Definitely, Maybe	Anne	
2008	Bubble-Rama	Darcy	Short film
2009	First Person Singular	Mimi	
2009	Tickling Leo	Delphina Adams	
2010	My Own Love Song	Nora	
2010	The Tested	Lisa Varone	
2012	The Amazing Spider-Man	Martha Connors	Deleted scenes
2012	Price Check	Sara Biltmore-Cozy	
2012	One for the Money	Mary Lou Stankovic	
2013	Wallace	Beatrice	Short film
2014	Wild Canaries	Eleanor	
2014	And So It Goes	Kate	
2015	Anesthesia	Rachel	
2021	Giving Birth to a Butterfly	Diana	
2023	Eric Larue	Stephanie	

=== Television ===
Year	Title	Role	Notes
1998–2003	As the World Turns	Julia Snyder	122 episodes
2001	Big Apple	Geena	Episode: "Pilot"
2002	Third Watch	Tammy Sizemore	2 episodes
2002	Law & Order	Jasmine Blake	Episode: "Attorney Client"
2004	Beverly Hills S.U.V.	Taylor Stevens	TV film
2004	Friends	Sarah	Episode: "The One with the Birth Mother"
2004	NYPD 2069	Gina Zal	TV film
2005–2006	Law & Order	Alexandra Borgia	Main role; 33 episodes
2010	Fringe	Teresa Rusk	Episode: "Unearthed"
2010	The Pacific	Sgt. Lena Basilone	2 episodes
2010	The Big C	Daphne	Episode: "There's No C in Team"
2010	Rubicon	Andy	7 episodes
2011	Unforgettable	Elaine Margulies	2 episodes
2011–2016	Person of Interest	Kara Stanton	8 episodes
2013	The Following	Debra Parker	14 episodes
2015	House of Cards	Suzie	Episode: "Chapter 38"
2016	Vinyl	Andrea Zito	8 episodes
2017–2019	Friends from College	Sam Delmonico	Main role
2018	The Looming Tower	Liz	4 episodes
2018	Paterno	Mary Kay Paterno	TV film
2018	The First	Ellen Dawes (Matthew's widow)	4 episodes
2020	Mrs. America	Midge Costanza	3 episodes
2026	Daredevil: Born Again	Ariana Iacovou	6 episodes

== Stage credits ==
Year	Title	Role	Venue	Ref.
2006	The Internationalist	The Internationalist	Off-Broadway, Vineyard Theatre	
2007	Prelude to a Kiss	Rita	Broadway, Todd Haimes Theatre	
2008	Becky Shaw	Becky Shaw	Regional, Humana Festival, Louisville, Kentucky	
2009	Becky Shaw	Becky Shaw	Off-Broadway, Second Stage Theatre	
2010	Clybourne Park	Betsy/Lindsay	Off-Broadway, Playwrights Horizons	
2012	Clybourne Park	Betsy/Lindsay	Broadway, Walter Kerr Theatre	
2018	Nassim	Guest Performer	Off-Broadway, City Center Stage 2	
2019	Long Lost	Molly	Off-Broadway, Manhattan Theatre Club	

== Awards and nominations ==
Year	Award	Category	Work	Result	Ref.
2001	Daytime Emmy Award	Outstanding Younger Actress in a Drama Series	As the World Turns	Nominated	
2007	Drama Desk Award	Outstanding Actress in a Play	The Internationalist	Nominated	
2009	Lucille Lortel Award	Outstanding Lead Actress in a Play	Becky Shaw	Nominated	
