= Grant Harvey =

American actor (born 1984)

- Born: Grant Whitney Harvey; June 30, 1984 (age 42); Hawthorne, Nevada, U.S.
- Education: University of Nevada, Reno
- Occupation: Actor
- Years active: 2008–present
- Height: 6 ft 0 in (1.83 m)

Grant Harvey (born June 30, 1984) is an American actor who is known for starring in films and television series such as Animal Kingdom, The Crossing, The Secret Life of the American Teenager, Thumper and Billy Boy.

== Early life ==
Harvey was born and raised in Hawthorne, Nevada, to parents Debbie and John Harvey. Harvey holds a Journalism degree from the University of Nevada, Reno.

== Career ==
Harvey landed his first acting gig on ABC Family's The Secret Life of the American Teenager, marking the start of his acting career. He guest-starred on the television series Masters of Sex, Supernatural, Lucifer, CSI, NCIS and Criminal Minds. He had a recurring role in Dan Fogelman's The Neighbors. In 2017, Harvey starred in the drama-crime film Billy Boy, and Jordan Ross' Thumper, produced by Cary Joji Fukunaga. In April 2018, Harvey appeared as Roy in The Crossing, and in 2019 as Colin in the fourth season of TNT's Animal Kingdom.

== Filmography ==
=== Film ===
Year	Title	Role	Notes
2008	Insomnia Century 21	Punks	Short
2009	Regression	Josh	Short
2011	Sanctuary	Jay	Short
2012	Save The Date	Trevor	
2012	Last Hours in Suburbia	Jackson	
2012	A Deadly Obsession (Campus Killer)	Connor	
2013	Geography Club	Nolan Lockwood	
2013	The Pug Snatcher	The Boyfriend	Short
2014	The Armadillo	Clark Barbato	Short
2014	Sins of Our Youth	Rich	
2014	Anonymous	Young Man	Short
2014	Starcrossed	Ben Rawlins	
2014	The Blackout	Holden	
2015	Imagination of Young	Detective Taylor	
2017	Thumper	Troy	
2017	But Deliver Us from Evil	Jeremiah Young	
2017	Billy Boy	Mikey Valentino	
2019	Lost Transmissions	Todd	
2020	All for Nikki	Kyle Kassidy	
2022	Emancipation	Leeds	
2023	Asleep in My Palm	Dark Mortius	
2025	The Accountant 2	Cobb	
2026	The Fix	Matt	
2027	F.A.S.T.	TBA	Post-production
TBA	The Life and Deaths of Wilson Shedd	TBA	Post-production

=== Television ===
Year	Title	Role	Notes
2007	House	Coast Guard Diver	Episode: "Human Error"
2009	Hung	Wolves Team Captain	Episode: "Doris is Dead or Are We Rich or Are We Poor"
2010–2013	The Secret Life of the American Teenager	Grant	Recurring; 32 episodes in seasons 2–5
2011	Days of Our Lives	Artie	2 episodes
2012	Jersey Shore Shark Attack	Bradford	TV movie
2012	Runaways	Mason Henry	
2012	CSI: NY	Eric Blaylock	Episode: "Civilized Lies"
2012–2013	The Neighbors	Jeremy	Recurring; 6 episodes
2014	Bones	Alex Heck	Episode: "The Mutilation of the Master Manipulator"
2014	CSI: Crime Scene Investigation	Pete McCrone	Episode: "Let's Make a Deal"
2015	Stalked by My Neighbor	Nick Thompkin	TV movie
2015	Criminal Minds	Marc Clifford	Episode: "A Place at the Table"
2015	Masters of Sex	Martin O'Reilly	Episode: "Surrogates"
2015	NCIS: New Orleans	Conner	Episode: "Sic Semper Tyrannis"
2015	CSI: Cyber	Holden Katnik	Episode: "Heart Me"
2016	Lucifer	The Would-Be Prince of Darkness	Episode: "The Would-Be Prince of Darkness"
2016	Supernatural	Petey Giraldi	Episode: "The Vessel"
2017	Small Shots	Copperfield	Episode: "Tonight's the Night Pt. 2"
2018	Unphiltered	Phil	3 episodes
2018	The Crossing	Roy Aronson	Recurring; 11 episodes
2018	Shooter	Jimmy Poole	2 episodes
2018	Medal of Honor	Joshua Hardt	Episode: "Ty Carter"
2019	The Rookie	Cole Midas	Episode: "Greenlight"
2019	Animal Kingdom	Colin	Recurring; 10 episodes
2022	NCIS	Ian Maddux	Episode: "All Hands"
2022	Station 19	N/A	Episode: "The Road You Didn't Take"
2023	Fire Country	Sleeper	2 episodes
2023	Tom Clancy's Jack Ryan	James (Bizhub Receptionist)	3 episodes
2025	Countdown	Todd	Recurring role; 3 episodes
