= Asleep in My Palm =

2023 American drama film

- Theatrical release poster
- Directed by: Henry Nelson
- Written by: Henry Nelson
- Produced by: Tim Blake Nelson; Shannon Houchins; Vince Jolivette
- Starring: Tim Blake Nelson; Chloë Kerwin; Jared Abrahamson; Grant Harvey; Gus Birney; David Aaron Baker
- Cinematography: Tatjana Krstevski
- Edited by: Max Ethan Miller
- Music by: Henry Nelson; Will Curry
- Production companies: Hideout Pictures; Red Barn Films
- Distributed by: Strike Back Studios
- Release dates: September 28, 2023 (Woodstock); March 1, 2024 (United States)
- Running time: 89 minutes
- Country: United States
- Language: English

Asleep in My Palm is a 2023 American drama film written and directed by Henry Nelson. The story follows Tom (portrayed by Tim Blake Nelson) and Beth Anne (Chloë Kerwin), a homeless father and his daughter living near a college in rural Ohio, as they try to survive the winter. Jared Abrahamson, Grant Harvey, Gus Birney, and David Aaron Baker also star.

Henry Nelson started writing the screenplay during his final year at Oberlin College, with the intent to film it with one of his professors in the starring role. He shared the script with his father Tim Blake Nelson, who signed on to produce and star in the film. The elder Nelson secured additional funding from his collaborators on Old Henry (2021), and principal photography took place in Oberlin, Ohio in early 2022. By March 2022, Kerwin and much of the supporting cast were confirmed to be starring. The film marked the directorial debut of Henry Nelson and the feature film debut of Kerwin.

After premiering at the Woodstock Film Festival in 2023, the film was released in select cinemas in the United States on March 1, 2024, by Strike Back Studios. It received generally positive reviews from critics, with many praising the performances of Tim Blake Nelson and Kerwin.

== Cast ==
- Tim Blake Nelson as Tom
- Chloë Kerwin as Beth Anne
- Jared Abrahamson as José
- Grant Harvey as Dark Mortius
- Gus Birney as Millah
- David Aaron Baker as Sam Wallace

== Production ==
=== Development ===
Henry Nelson began writing Asleep in My Palm as he was about to graduate from Oberlin College. He was inspired by his love of the 2000 film Chuck & Buck (2000), whose main character he "really related to". He sought to write a film with a similar tone but "in a very different setting" before eventually developing it into a "whole other movie". He originally intended for the main role of Tom to be portrayed by one of his music professors, but after sharing the screenplay with his father Tim Blake Nelson, the latter said that the part required "a real actor" and offered to star. Tim Blake Nelson reached out to the financiers of Old Henry (2021), which he starred in, to receive funding for the project. Shannon Houchins of Hideout Pictures, who also produced Old Henry, signed on as a producer, while the film's writer and director Potsy Ponciroli serving as an executive producer. Once Tim Blake Nelson was cast, he and Henry worked together to develop the character of Tom to "suit certain things [Tim Blake Nelson] was gonna be able to bring" to the role.

=== Filming ===
The Nelsons hired cinematographer Tatjana Krstevski based on the strength of her work on The Load (2018), a Serbian film that they found "extraordinary". Asleep in My Palm was "predominantly" shot using a 25 mm camera lens to communicate that "the camera was almost struggling to be in the room".

The film was officially announced in December 2021, with principal photography scheduled to begin in Oberlin, Ohio in late January 2022. Filming took place over 17 days near Oberlin College. In March 2022, it was confirmed that Chloë Kerwin, Grant Harvey, Gus Birney, and Jared Abrahamson also starred in the film, and that it had "recently wrapped production" in Oberlin. Asleep in My Palm was Kerwin's first film role. Production required flight training, but as the film did not have a high enough budget to cover the costs, Tim Blake Nelson paid for the lessons out of pocket.

== Release ==
Asleep in My Palm premiered at the Woodstock Film Festival on September 28, 2023, and screened at the Nashville Film Festival on September 30.

The film had a limited theatrical release in the United States by Strike Back Studios on March 1, 2024, followed by a video-on-demand release on March 19. It was later released to streaming services, including Amazon Prime Video, on April 19.

== Reception ==
=== Critical response ===
On the review aggregator website Rotten Tomatoes, 93% of 14 critics' reviews are positive, with an average rating of 6.3/10. Metacritic, which uses a weighted average, assigned the film a score of 66 out of 100, based on 4 critics, indicating "generally favorable" reviews.

Kyle Smith of The Wall Street Journal called the film a "virtuoso debut" with a "wonderfully offbeat imagination". In addition to Henry Nelson's direction, Smith praised the "oddly charismatic" and "beautifully naturalistic" lead performances of Tim Blake Nelson and Chloë Kerwin, respectively. He criticized some of the film's dialogue for its inaccuracy to "how the downtrodden actually speak", but concluded that "the film has much to recommend it, especially given its status as a rookie effort".

RogerEbert.com's Tomris Laffly also praised the lead actors, along with the "loose-limbed and terrific" Jared Abrahamson and the "charismatic" Grant Harvey. She complimented Henry Nelson's direction for having the "finesse of someone far more experienced" and for the story's focus on "the kinds of lives many would rather not talk about", but found the final act to be "unfortunately undercooked" and "disappointing".

In a review for Collider, Chase Hutchinson echoed the praise for Tim Blake Nelson and Kerwin, saying that "the duo of leads is what gives [the film] life", but was critical of some of the "slightly contrived" conflicts and "occasionally stilted" dialogue.

=== Accolades ===
Awards and nominations received by Asleep in My Palm
Award or film festival	Date of ceremony	Category	Recipient(s)	Result	Ref.
Woodstock Film Festival	September 30, 2023	Gigantic Pictures Award for Best Feature Narrative	Henry Nelson	Nominated	
Woodstock Film Festival	September 30, 2023	Best Editing: Narrative	Max Ethan Miller	Won	
Woodstock Film Festival	September 30, 2023	Haskell Wexler Award for Best Cinematography	Tatjana Krstevski	Won	
