= David Aaron Baker =

American actor

- Born: August 14, 1963 (age 63); Durham, North Carolina
- Occupation: Actor
- Years active: 1993–present

David Aaron Baker (born August 14, 1963) is an American actor whose credits stretch across theater, film, television and audiobooks.

== Biography ==
On Broadway, he is most prominently known for his starring role as "Prince Dauntless" opposite Sarah Jessica Parker in the 1996 Tony nominated revival of Once Upon a Mattress. He subsequently appeared in the 2004 revival of Lorraine Hansberry's A Raisin in the Sun, opposite Phylicia Rashad, Audra McDonald, Sanaa Lathan, and Sean Combs.

Baker performed as Jimmy Curry in New York City Opera's 1992 production of 110 in the Shade at Lincoln Center's New York State Theater, and then in 2018 appeared on the same stage in New York City Ballet's Jerome Robbins 100 Festival playing the MajorDomo in Fanfare (ballet).

On film, he has appeared in Woody Allen’s Melinda and Melinda. He is the voice of Dean Koontz's Odd Thomas on audio book. He voices a role in QCode’s fiction series podcast Listening In starring Rachel Brosnahan.

== Filmography ==
- Sex and the City (1998) as Ted in Season 1, Episode 6: "Secret Sex"
- Getting to Know You (1998) as Dr. Clarke
- The Tao of Steve (2000) as Rick
- The Music Man (2003) as Marcellus
- Criminal Minds (2005) as Will Sykes in Season 1, Episode 17: "A Real Rain"
- Molly: An American Girl on the Home Front (2006) as James McIntire
- Once More with Feeling (2009) as Rich
- Blue Bloods (2010) as Father Leo in Season 1, Episodes 6: "Smack Attack"
- Boardwalk Empire (2010–2011) as Bill Fallon in 6 episodes
- And So It Goes (2014) as David Shaw
- The Purge: Election Year (2016), as NFFA Press Secretary Tommy Roseland
- Boarding School (2018) as Davis Rathbone
- The Society (2019) as Jim Pressman in Season 1, Episode 1: "What Happened"
- Prodigal Son (2021) as Bobby Stevens in Season 2, Episode 11: "You Can Run..."
- Asleep in My Palm (2023) as Sam Wallace
