= Constance Shulman =

American actress

- Born: Constance Ann Shulman; April 4, 1958 (age 68); Johnson City, Tennessee, U.S.
- Education: University of Tennessee
- Occupation: Actress
- Years active: 1987–present
- Spouse: Reed Birney (m. 1999)
- Children: 2, including Gus Birney

Constance Ann Shulman (born April 4, 1958) is an American actress. In 1987, Shulman originated the role of Annelle in the first production of Steel Magnolias off Broadway. She later appeared in films Fletch Lives (1989), Men Don't Leave (1990), and Fried Green Tomatoes (1991). She voiced Patti Mayonnaise in the animated sitcom Doug (1991–99) and the 1999 film Doug's 1st Movie. She played Yoga Jones in the Netflix comedy-drama series, Orange Is the New Black from 2013 to 2017, for which she received three Screen Actors Guild Awards for Outstanding Performance by an Ensemble in a Comedy Series.

== Life and career ==
A native of Johnson City, Tennessee, Shulman is one of seven children born to Mr. and Mrs. Herbert Lipner Shulman, a Jewish-American couple who had recently relocated from Fall River, Massachusetts. She is also the granddaughter of Judge Sadie Lipner Shulman. In 1980, she graduated from the University of Tennessee with a bachelor's degree in both speech and theater. She moved to New York City to study acting at the Circle in the Square Theatre School and pursue an acting career. In 1987, Shulman originated the role of Annelle in the first production of Steel Magnolias on Off-Broadway. In 1989, she made her screen debut in the comedy film Fletch Lives, playing Cindy Mae. She later had supporting parts in films Lost Angels (1989), Men Don't Leave (1990), and Fried Green Tomatoes (1991).

On television, Shulman worked as a voice actress, playing Patti Mayonnaise on Doug from 1991 to 1999. In the early 1990s, Shulman appeared in a series of Kraft mayonnaise commercials. She was also a regular cast member in the short-lived 1996 ABC sitcom, The Faculty, playing the best friend of Meredith Baxter's character, and the Dolly Parton unaired CBS sitcom Heavens to Betsy (1994). In the late 1990s Shulman left the screen to raise her two children.

In 2013, Shulman was cast in a recurring role as "Yoga Jones" in the Netflix comedy-drama series, Orange Is the New Black. Along with the rest of the cast, she received a Screen Actors Guild Award for Outstanding Performance by an Ensemble in a Comedy Series in 2015, 2016 and 2017. She left the series after five seasons in 2017 and appeared in the series finale in 2019. She later appeared in films Nasty Baby (2015) and Most Likely to Murder (2018) and guest-starred on Law & Order: Special Victims Unit, Broad City, and The Blacklist.

In 2015, Shulman starred in off-Broadway production of Barbecue receiving an AUDELCO nomination. In 2018, Shulman received positive reviews and a Drama Desk Award for Outstanding Featured Actress in a Play nomination for her performance in the play Bobbie Clearly. In 2019 she performed in the Broadway revival of The Rose Tattoo. In 2021, Shulman starred in the independent films Giving Birth to a Butterfly playing a former actress like Norma Desmond and Strawberry Mansion. Both films have received positive reviews from critics. In 2022, she had a recurring role in the HBO Max comedy series Search Party and later was cast in the Showtime comedy The Curse. In 2023 she starred in the Manhattan Theatre Club production of The Best We Could.

== Personal life ==
She is married to fellow actor Reed Birney, and their daughter Gus Birney is an actress.

== Filmography ==
=== Film ===
Year	Title	Role	Notes
1989	Fletch Lives	Cindy Mae	
1989	Lost Angels	Beautician	
1990	Men Don't Leave	Carly	
1990	Reversal of Fortune	Pharmacist	Uncredited
1991	He Said, She Said	Make-Up Girl	
1991	McBain	Dr. Blazier	
1991	Fried Green Tomatoes	Missy	
1993	Weekend at Bernie's II	Tour Operator	
1999	Doug's 1st Movie	Patti Mayonnaise	Voice role
1999	Sweet and Lowdown	Hazel	
2008	A Jersey Christmas	Connie	
2009	Finding Jean Lewis	Connie Lewis	Short film
2015	Nasty Baby	Bishop's Girlfriend	
2016	Better Off Single	Unemployment Worker	
2017	Sylvio	Tina	
2017	The Broken Ones	Rowland	
2018	Mama Jane	Jane	Short film
2018	Most Likely to Murder	Lowell's Mom	
2020	Central Standard	Poppy	
2020	Smithtown	Cindy Cohen	
2021	Giving Birth to a Butterfly	Monica	
2021	Strawberry Mansion	Martha	
2022	Funny Pages	Mrs. Ochs	
2024	Darla in Space	Leona Peterson	
2025	Caravan	Margaux	

=== Television ===
Year	Title	Role	Notes
1989	The Days and Nights of Molly Dodd	Bonnie Sayles	Episodes: "Here's Why You Should Lock Your Bathroom Door" and "Here's a Little Night Music"
1991	Lethal Innocence	Nell Willis	Television film
1991–1992	Loving	Maggie	Recurring role
1991–1999	Doug	Patti Mayonnaise	Voice role Main role, 117 episodes
1994	Heavens to Betsy	Donna	6 episodes
1996	The Faculty	Shelly Ray	13 episodes
2013–2017; 2019	Orange Is the New Black	Yoga Jones	Recurring role, 48 episodes Screen Actors Guild Award for Outstanding Performance by an Ensemble in a Comedy Series (2015–17); Nominated—Screen Actors Guild Award for Outstanding Performance by an Ensemble in a Comedy Series
2014	Law & Order: Special Victims Unit	Daycare Manager	Episode: "Wednesday's Child"
2017	Star vs. the Forces of Evil	Milly Sparkles	Voice role, episode: "Mathmagic/The Bounce Lounge"
2017	Broad City	Oda	Episode: "Sliding Doors"
2017	The Blacklist	Fiona	Episode: "Ilyas Surkov (No. 54)"
2019	OK K.O.! Let's Be Heroes	Dr. Sphinxson	Voice role, episode: "Radical Rescue"
2022	Search Party	Helen	3 episodes
2023–2024	The Curse	Elizabeth	Recurring role
2026	Will Trent	Shelly	Episode: "The Blank Expanse of Nothing"
2026	Furious	Marshall's mom	Episodes: "Memory Distortion" and "Some Days It Don't Come Easy"

=== Stage ===
Year	Title	Role	Notes
1987	Steel Magnolias	Annelle	WPA Theatre, Off-Broadway
1993	Loose Knit	Margie	Second Stage Theater, Off-Broadway
2015	Barbecue	Adlean	Public Theater, Off-Broadway
2018	Bobbie Clearly	Darla London	Roundabout Theatre Company, Off-Broadway
2019	The Rose Tattoo	The Strega	American Airlines Theatre, Broadway
2022	Shhhh	Witchy Witch/Sally	Atlantic Theater Company, Off-Broadway
2023	The Best We Could	Peg	Manhattan Theatre Club, Off-Broadway
2024	Dirty Laundry	Another Woman	WP Theater
2025–2026	Well, I'll Let You Go	Joanie	The Space at Irondale/Studio Seaview, Off-Broadway
