= Julia Snyder =

- As the World Turns character
- Portrayed by: Annie Parisse
- Duration: 1998–2003
- First appearance: April 13, 1998
- Last appearance: January 9, 2003
- Created by: Lorraine Broderick
In-universe information
- Occupation: Journalist; Physician's assistant
- Parents: Charles Lindsey; Charlotte Lindsey
- Spouse: Jack Snyder

Julia Snyder is a fictional character from the CBS daytime soap opera As the World Turns. Actress Annie Parisse portrayed the character from April 13, 1998, to August 21, 2001. In 2001, Parisse was nominated for a Daytime Emmy Award for Outstanding Younger Actress in a Drama Series for the role. Parisse later returned for a handful of episodes in 2002 and for one episode in 2003.

== See also ==
- Jack Snyder and Carly Tenney
