= Mickey and Friends Trick or Treats =

2023 TV special for Mickey Mouse

- Promotional poster
- Genre: Comedy; Horror; Slapstick
- Written by: Kim Duran
- Directed by: David H. Brooks
- Starring: Bret Iwan; Kaitlyn Robrock; Tony Anselmo; Debra Wilson; Bill Farmer; Misty Lee; Kimmy Gatewood
- Composers: Beau Black & David Goldsmith (songs); Tony Morales (underscore)
- Country of origin: United States
- Original language: English

Production
- Producer: David H. Brooks
- Editor: Jenny McKibben
- Running time: 22 minutes
- Production companies: Stoopid Buddy Stoodios; Disney Television Studios

Original release
- Network: Disney Channel; Disney Junior; Disney XD
- Release: October 1, 2023

Mickey and Friends Trick or Treats is a musical stop-motion Halloween television special which premiered on October 1, 2023. It was released simultaneously on Disney Channel, Disney Junior, and Disney XD. It is produced by Stoopid Buddy Stoodios in association with Disney Junior. It is the fourth spin-off special of Mickey Mouse Mixed-Up Adventures, following Mickey's Tale of Two Witches, Mickey and Minnie Wish Upon a Christmas, and Mickey Saves Christmas, and the second made in stop-motion after Mickey Saves Christmas.

== Premise ==
Mickey and friends are trick-or-treating when Donald spies the scariest mansion he has ever seen and convinces his friends to risk a visit, but the owner, Witch Hazel, casts a spell that transforms them into their costumes.

== Voice cast ==
- Bret Iwan as Mickey Mouse
- Kaitlyn Robrock as Minnie Mouse
- Tony Anselmo as Donald Duck
- Debra Wilson as Daisy Duck
- Bill Farmer as Goofy
- Misty Lee as Witch Hazel
- Kimmy Gatewood as Ghost Bride

== Production ==
David H. Brooks serves as the director-producer of Mickey and Friends Trick or Treats. The television special uses stop-motion animation. It was animated by Stoopid Buddy Stoodios.

=== Music ===
- "Fright Night" – sung by Mickey & the gang
- "Alone on Halloween" – sung by Witch Hazel
- "Friends Like You Make Halloween" – performed by Beau Black

== Release ==
Mickey and Friends Trick or Treats was officially announced in August 2023. The trailer was released during the same month. The television special premiered on October 1, airing simultaneously on Disney Channel, Disney Junior, and Disney XD. It was subsequently made available on DisneyNow. It also began streaming on Disney+ the following day.

== Reception ==
=== Critical response ===
Alex Reif of Laughing Place compared Mickey and Friends Trick or Treats to Mickey Saves Christmas, expressing hope that this wouldn’t mark the end of stop-motion Mickey Mouse holiday specials. He praised both productions as "fantastic," noting that amidst a landscape filled with quickly produced and often forgettable CG content, these legacy approaches feel especially meaningful. Daps Magic described the film as a "lovely new Halloween special for Disney fans," highlighting its cuteness, charm, and moments of humor that create an enjoyable family viewing experience, while complimenting the stop-motion animation.

Jack Hackney of the Daily Mirror included Mickey and Friends Trick or Treats in his list of the "10 Best Halloween Films for Kids" in 2023, calling it an entertaining and suitable Halloween option for children. Stephanie Morgan of Common Sense Media rated the special three out of five stars, commending its positive messages and role models, particularly emphasizing themes of kindness and friendship.

=== Ratings ===
On its premiere date, Mickey and Friends Trick or Treats was watched by 95,000 total viewers (P2+) on Disney Channel, earning a 0.03% rating. Among viewers aged 18–49, it attracted 26,400 viewers with a 0.02% rating.

=== Accolades ===
Mickey and Friends Trick or Treats won Preschool Programming—Best Holiday or Special Episode at the 2025 Kidscreen Awards.
