= Giving Birth to a Butterfly =

- Directed by: Theodore Schaefer
- Written by: Theodore Schaefer; Patrick Lawler
- Starring: Annie Parisse; Gus Birney
- Release date: August 9, 2021 (Fantasia)
- Running time: 77 minutes
- Country: United States
- Language: English

Giving Birth to a Butterfly is a 2021 American mystery comedy drama film written by Theodore Schaefer and Patrick Lawler, directed by Schaefer and starring Annie Parisse and Gus Birney. It is Schaefer's feature directorial debut.

== Plot summary ==
After having her identity stolen, a woman, and her son's pregnant girlfriend, bond together on a surreal journey as they attempt to track down the perpetrators.

== Cast ==
- Annie Parisse as Diana
- Gus Birney as Marlene
- Rachel Resheff as Danielle
- Constance Shulman
- Paul Sparks as Daryl
- Owen Campbell

== Release ==
The film premiered at the Fantasia International Film Festival on August 9, 2021. Then it was screened in Los Angeles on May 10, 2023. It was also released on Fandor on May 16, 2023.

== Reception ==
The film has a 73% rating on Rotten Tomatoes based on 22 reviews. Lorry Kikta of Film Threat rated the film an 8 out of 10.

Katie Rife of The A.V. Club gave the film a positive review and wrote, "But flimsy as it is, Giving Birth To A Butterfly shows promise."

Drew Tinnin of Dread Central awarded the film three and a half stars out of five and wrote, "Giving Birth to a Butterfly dovetails between the mundane and the profound, the way poems often do."

Shelagh Rowan-Legg of Screen Anarchy gave the film a positive review and wrote, "While it's missing some connective tissue that would strengthen its American-style magical realism mode, there's a heartache and a hopefulness to it that makes for a compelling journey."

Jon Mendelsohn of Comic Book Resources gave the film a positive review and wrote, "Overall, Giving Birth to a Butterfly is more like a complicated poem than a fully realized film, but it's still original enough to warrant a first-time viewing."

David Lynch of KENS gave the film a positive review and wrote, "If Giving Birth to a Butterfly finds Schaefer in his own storytelling metamorphosis, it’s worth awaiting what he has to offer once fully emerged."
