= Thanksgiving (Master of None) =

- Master of None episode
- Episode no.: Season 2 Episode 8
- Directed by: Melina Matsoukas
- Written by: Aziz Ansari; Lena Waithe
- Production code: 208
- Original release date: May 12, 2017
- Running time: 34 minutes

Guest appearances
- Angela Bassett as Catherine; Kym Whitley as Joyce; Venida Evans as Ernestine; Ebony Obsidian as Michelle; Erica Mena as Nikki

Episode chronology
← Previous "Door #3"	Next → "Amarsi Un Po'"

"Thanksgiving" is the eighth episode of the second season of the American comedy-drama streaming television series Master of None. The episode was released on Netflix on May 12, 2017, along with the rest of the second season. It was written by series creator Aziz Ansari and Lena Waithe, who star as Dev Shah and Denise. Melina Matsoukas served as the episode's director.

The episode follows Dev celebrating Thanksgiving with Denise's family throughout the years, as Dev's family doesn't celebrate the holiday. The episode details Denise's coming out as a lesbian throughout the years and their growing, yet resistant acceptance. The episode received widespread acclaim from critics. "Thanksgiving" won the Primetime Emmy Award for Outstanding Writing for a Comedy Series, making Waithe the first African-American woman ever to win such award.

== Plot ==
As Dev's family does not celebrate Thanksgiving, he has spent it with Denise's family for years, the two being childhood friends. On Thanksgiving in 1995, 12-year-old Denise begins to realize she is attracted to women. On Thanksgiving 1999, she comes out to Dev. When he asks why she is nervous to tell her family, she says LGBT issues are touchy in black families. On Thanksgiving in 2006, Denise comes out to her mother Catherine (Angela Bassett). Catherine asks her sister Joyce (Kym Whitley) if this is her fault. On Thanksgiving in 2015, Denise brings her girlfriend Michelle (Ebony Obsidian). Catherine and Joyce are obviously annoyed, and attempt to hide the fact that Denise is gay from her grandma, Ernestine (Venida Evans). The next year, Denise brings home a superficial girl named Nikki (Erica Mena). After dinner, Dev talks with Catherine and Joyce. Catherine admits that while she does struggle with embracing her daughter's sexuality, she still wishes for Denise to end up with a nice woman, and misses Michelle. Finally, on Thanksgiving in 2017, Denise and Michelle are dating again. Joyce and Ernestine are happy to see her. Michelle and Catherine talk alone, and Catherine admits to Denise she is happy the two of them are together. Denise, Catherine, Joyce, Ernestine, Dev, and Michelle have a wonderful dinner, and happily say grace together.

== Production and development ==
The episode was partially based on co-writer Waithe's own life.

== Reception ==
In 2018, TV Guide listed "Thanksgiving" as number 10 in their "TV Guide's 65 Best Episodes of the 21st Century" issue.

Upon winning a Primetime Emmy Award for Outstanding Writing for a Comedy Series, Waithe became the first African-American woman to win an Emmy Award in that category. The episode also won the GLAAD Media Award for Outstanding Individual Episode.
