= Venida Evans =

American actress

- Born: Ypsilanti, Michigan, U.S.
- Occupation: Actor

Venida Evans is an American television, film, stage and commercial actress. Evans is perhaps best known to audiences for her role as "The Muse" in a series of IKEA television commercials in the United States beginning in 2008.

== Personal life ==
Evans was born in Ypsilanti, Michigan, but raised in Detroit. Her father (who was born on April 10, 1912) was 97 years old as of April 2009, while her mother is deceased.

Evans graduated from Southwestern High School in Detroit. She later attended Fisk University in Nashville, Tennessee. Evans also served as an enlisted member of the United States Air Force.

== Career ==
Evans moved from her native Detroit to New York City in 1972 to pursue her acting career. She took a job as a theater usher on Broadway as a "survival job" to pay her bills while she simultaneously pursued acting jobs. Evans continued ushering until 1999, when she began acting full-time. In a 2009 interview with The Detroit News, Evans stated that she would still return to her past job if her acting career ever stalled saying, "I still know how to say 'Five rows up and six seats over."

Evans' earlier film credits included a small role as a nurse in the 1981 film, Only When I Laugh. She has also appeared in the 1998 Merchant Ivory Productions film, Side Streets and in several episodes of the NBC series Law & Order and Law & Order: Special Victims Unit. Other television credits have included Third Watch and New York Undercover.

=== Recent career ===
Venida Evans began appearing in a series of IKEA advertisements beginning in 2008 as an invisible, older woman known simply as "The Muse." The commercials were created by Deutsch New York, the ad agency which is responsible for IKEA's advertisements in the United States. While some television viewers thought that Evans was a ghost in the IKEA ad campaign, executives at Deutsch New York envisioned her character as a "muse." Peter Nicholson, the chief creative officer of Deutsch New York, described the concept of the muse which Evans plays in the commercials saying, "She's the voice of reason and support and your consciousness of why you made a good purchase of an Ikea product. She's got this Mary Poppins quality to me."

Critics and viewers have taken notice of both Evans and the IKEA ad campaign. The ads have variously been described as "surreal" and "creepy." Philadelphia Daily News columnist Ellen Gray compared Evans' IKEA "Muse" to Bruce Willis' character in The Sixth Sense. Evans has said that she never intended for her character in the commercials to be creepy.

Evans' other recent work has included a recurring role on the CBS soap opera, Guiding Light, where she plays a grandmother named Loretta. She has also stated that she will audition for a part in a future Adam Sandler film, noting that her career has accelerated since the launch of the IKEA commercials in 2008.

Evans referred to herself as a "flavor of the month" in a 2009 interview with The Detroit News. She was referring specifically to the sudden interest in her career after working as an actress for more than thirty years. Evans told The Detroit News, "Baby, it's a roller coaster ride. But I'm having a lot of fun...There have been a lot of ups and downs. But suddenly I'm experiencing a real up-kick, which is scary but exciting." On May 21, 2009, she also appeared on ABC's Who Wants To Be A Millionaire winning $8000.

== Filmography ==
=== Film ===
Film work by Venida Evans
Year	Title	Role	Notes
1981	Only When I Laugh	Nurse Garcia	
1998	OK Garage	Florence	
1998	Side Streets	Lydia Moulet	
2002	Just a Kiss	Nurse	
2002	Paper Soldiers	Old Woman	
2002	Brown Sugar	Older Woman	
2005	Transamerica	Arletty	
2009	Once More with Feeling	Lucille	Direct-to-video
2009	Zinzi the Musical	Lavinia	Short film
2010	March!	Ms. J	
2011	The Adjustment Bureau	Bus Passenger	
2013	A Strange Brand of Happy	Rose	
2013	Home	Ginnie	
2014	The Bravest, The Boldest	Miss Jeanette	Short film
2014	I Origins	Margaret Dairy	
2014	Teenage Mutant Ninja Turtles	Subway Hostage	
2017	I Love You, Daddy	Old Woman	Uncredited
2018	Here and Now	Older Woman	

=== Television ===
Television work by Venida Evans
Year	Title	Role	Notes
1992, 2005	Law & Order	Jury Forewoman, Foreperson	2 episodes
1997	New York Undercover	Clarita Armstrong	Episode: "Fade Out"
1999	Third Watch	Sexton	Episode: "Impulse"
2000	Tales from the Crypt	Mambo Delaruse (voice)	Episode: "Zombie!"
2003	Little Bill	Ms. Moses (voice)	Episode: "The Musical Instrument/The Choir"
2004	Law & Order: Criminal Intent	Mrs. Rankin	Episode: "Mad Hops"
2005	The Exonerated	State Attorney	Television film
2005	Law & Order: Special Victims Unit	Old Lady	Episode: "911"
2010–11, 2013	Treme	Mrs. Brooks	16 episodes
2013	Boardwalk Empire	Ada Monroe	Episode: "The Old Ship of Zion"
2014	Crazy House	Frieda	Television film
2015	Blue Bloods	Mrs. Alice Jackson	Episode: "In the Box"
2015	Nurse Jackie	Old Woman	Episode: "Serviam in Caritate"
2015	Limitless	Cora Boyle	Episode: "This Is Your Brain on Drugs"
2017	Girls	Senior Citizen	Episode: "What Will We Do This Time About Adam?"
2017	Master of None	Ernestine	Episode: "Thanksgiving"
2018	Sweetbitter	Mrs. Neely	Episode: "Salt"
2018	Luke Cage	Elderly Neighbor	Episode: "Straighten It Out"
2018	Orange Is the New Black	Mabel Wilkinson	Episode: "Changing Winds"
2018	You	Older Woman	Episode: "Pilot"
2018	Daredevil	Mrs. Callahan	Episode: "The Perfect Game"
2019	The Village	Mrs. Kang	Episode: "Good Thing"
2019	First Wives Club	Doreen	Episode: "The Glow Up"
2020	Awkwafina Is Nora from Queens	Raspy Voiced Casino Woman	Episode: "Atlantic City"
2020	The Last O.G.	Aunt Claretha	Episode: "Family Feud"
2021	For Life	Noreen	Episode: "Say His Name"
2021	The Equalizer	Ms. Sharpe	Episode: "It Takes a Village"
2021	The Other Two	Elderly Woman	Episode: "Pat Hosts Just Another Regular Show"

=== Video games ===
Video game work by Venida Evans
Year	Title	Role	Notes
2005	True Crime: New York City		
