= Good on Paper =

- Official poster
- Directed by: Kimmy Gatewood
- Written by: Iliza Shlesinger
- Produced by: Paul Bernon; Sam Slater; Han West; David Bernon
- Starring: Iliza Shlesinger; Ryan Hansen; Margaret Cho; Rebecca Rittenhouse
- Cinematography: Giles Dunning
- Edited by: Kyla Plewes
- Music by: Jonathan Sanford
- Production companies: Burn Later Productions; Meridian Content; Universal Pictures
- Distributed by: Netflix
- Release date: June 23, 2021 (United States)
- Running time: 92 minutes
- Country: United States
- Language: English

Good on Paper is a 2021 American romantic comedy film, directed by Kimmy Gatewood in her directorial debut, from a screenplay by Iliza Shlesinger. It stars Shlesinger, Ryan Hansen, Margaret Cho, and Rebecca Rittenhouse. The film was released on June 23, 2021, by Netflix.

== Plot ==
Living in Los Angeles, Andrea Singer is a stand-up comedian and a struggling aspiring actress. She is frustrated that Serrena, another woman who has been there for as long as her, is much more successful than she is. At the airport on the way home from an audition in New York City, Andrea meets Dennis Kelley when he returns her missing boarding pass.

On the flight, Andrea finds herself sitting next to Dennis, who tells her that he's a Yale graduate who works in hedge funds. They hit it off and begin hanging out together as friends in the city. Dennis joins her for drinks at her best friend Margot's bar.

Andrea sees Dennis as both pompous and humble, and different than most everyone else. Available to her whenever she's free, he helps her prepare for auditions and they become good friends. Andrea is not even remotely attracted to Dennis.

After a gig at The Comedy Store, Dennis asks Andrea to be his girlfriend over an expensive dinner his credit card is declined to pay, but she isn't interested. Complimenting her, he claims he had ordered her a bracelet at Cartier but had to return it as it wasn't what he'd asked for.

Shortly after, Andrea gets the lead in a series being shot in Vancouver called Space Cadet. She's with Margot when she gets the call. Excited, she calls Dennis to share the news. He proposes they go out on Friday to celebrate, but she already has a date.

On Friday night, Dennis interrupts Andrea's date to spend time with him under the pretense that his mother is dying of cancer. They get high and go out, hooking up at the end of the night. In the morning, Andrea agrees to be his girlfriend.

As Andrea and Dennis get closer, she and her friend Margot start to question if he is all that he claims. They drive to the address Andrea has for him planning to leave him a gift. She learns Dennis has lied about his house and that he has two female roommates.

Andrea confronts Dennis over lying about his living situation, and he further lies about his sick mother living in his house, which she believes. They go to Santa Monica to spend the weekend with her cousin Brett and Alli, both doctors and Yale alumni. Andrea surprises them with a gift of a round of golf, as the men are supposedly golfers. But Dennis fakes an injury to get out of it. That evening Andrea, beginning to be really suspicious, asks Dennis about his diploma, the bracelet and his mother. He presents her with a gaudy ring, meant to be a pre-engagement one.

Back in LA, Margot calls Andrea to give her more dirt on him right before the table read for the pilot. Serrena shows as a guest. Although furious she infiltrated her first big acting gig, Andrea later enlists Serrena's help in investigating Dennis with Margot.

The house he claimed was his is inhabited by a Hispanic woman named Denise. Andrea and Margot interview his roommates, who confirm his work and college education claims are lies. In an attempt to get even, Margot gets Dennis drunk and he passes out. Margot and Andrea accidentally injure him, and Andrea confronts him for his lying. Dennis later takes her to court for kidnapping him. After confronting him again, she is given a restraining order and more fodder for her stand-up routine.

== Cast ==
- Iliza Shlesinger as Andrea Singer, a stand-up comedian who has been putting her career ahead of romance
- Ryan Hansen as Dennis Kelley, Andrea's love interest. He claims to be a Yale graduate and a hedge fund manager, but nothing is really what it seems
- Margaret Cho as Margot, Andrea's best friend who owns a bar. She is suspicious of Dennis's story.
- Rebecca Rittenhouse as Serrena Halstead, a rival actress who seems to audition for a lot of parts that Andrea is going for, and lands them.
- Matt McGorry as Brett, Andrea's cousin, and an actual Yale graduate
- Tyler Cameron as Ruggedly Handsome Man
- Taylor Hill as Chanterelle
- Kimia Behpoornia as Maggie, Dennis's roommate
- Beth Dover as Leslie
- Sonya Eddy as Judge Harriet Gold

== Origin ==
The film originated from a real-life incident involving Shlesinger, which she turned into a stand-up routine called "Lying Brian" in 2015 that was broadcast on This Is Not Happening on Comedy Central. In Shlesinger's comedic routine, she tells of meeting a man named Brian on an airplane who claimed to be a Yale graduate and worked at a hedge fund. They became friends, but when he called to tell her that his mother had cancer, they dated more and got into a relationship. Shlesinger's mother was suspicious of his background, finding that he went to the University of Ohio (Note: Although the source cited does say "University of Ohio", there is no institution with this name, so this may be a reference to Ohio University, Ohio State University, or some other university in the state of Ohio.) and that he lived in a duplex in Hollywood and not a house in Beverly Hills. When Shlesinger asked Brian for his mother's address, she found that no one related lived there. Brian eventually confessed it was all a lie to try to impress her.

== Production ==
In April 2020, it was reported that Iliza Shlesinger had completed the film in a lead role, with Kimmy Gatewood directing, with Universal Pictures distributing.

Principal photography began in November 2019 and completed in December 2019.

== Release ==
The film was released on June 23, 2021, by Netflix.

== Reception ==
On review aggregator Rotten Tomatoes, the film holds an approval rating of 51% based on 37 reviews, with the average rating of 5.1/10. The website's critical consensus reads, "Writer-star Iliza Shlesinger finds some laughs in real-life romantic travails, but Good on Paper makes an overall awkward transition from stand-up to screen." On Metacritic, the film holds a rating of 54 out of 100, based on 11 critics, indicating "mixed or average" reviews.

Decider called it an anti-rom-com and wrote: "A solid premise and Shlesinger and Hansen's unconventional chemistry make it more than worth your while."
