= Shining Vale =

2022 American comedy horror television series

- Genre: Comedy horror Satire
- Created by: Jeff Astrof; Sharon Horgan
- Starring: Courteney Cox; Greg Kinnear; Gus Birney; Merrin Dungey; Dylan Gage; Mira Sorvino
- Composer: Tim Phillips
- Country of origin: United States
- Original language: English
- No. of seasons: 2
- No. of episodes: 16

Production
- Executive producers: Jeff Astrof; Dana Honor; Sharon Horgan; Aaron Kaplan; Clelia Mountford
- Producer: Courteney Cox
- Editors: Gardner Gould; Antonia de Barros; Joel Griffen
- Running time: 29 minutes
- Production companies: Other Shoe Productions; Merman; Kapital Entertainment; Lionsgate Television; Warner Bros. Television

Original release
- Network: Starz
- Release: March 6, 2022 – December 1, 2023

Shining Vale is an American satirical comedy horror television series created by Jeff Astrof and Sharon Horgan. The series stars Courteney Cox, Greg Kinnear, Sherilyn Fenn, Mira Sorvino, Merrin Dungey, and Judith Light. It premiered on Starz on March 6, 2022. In May 2022, the series was renewed for a second season. The second season premiered on October 13, 2023. In December 2023, the series was canceled after two seasons, with its seasons to be removed from the streaming service. On January 1, 2025, the series became available for streaming on Max.

== Premise ==
A dysfunctional family moves from the city to a small town after Patricia "Pat" Phelps, a former "wild child" who became famous through writing raunchy female empowerment novels, is caught cheating on her husband. The house the family moves into is a place where, in the past, terrible atrocities have taken place. Nobody seems to suspect anything odd except for Pat who is convinced she is either depressed or possessed. Pat has been sober for 16 years, but begins to feel very unfulfilled in life – she still has not written her second novel, she cannot remember the last time she had sex with her husband, and her teenage kids have grown up to the point they do not want their mother in their lives. Soon, the demons haunting the family's new home begin to appear much more real.

== Cast and characters ==
=== Main ===
- Courteney Cox as Patricia "Pat" Phelps
- Greg Kinnear as Terry Phelps
- Gus Birney as Gaynor Phelps
- Dylan Gage as Jake Phelps
- Merrin Dungey as Kam
- Mira Sorvino as Rosemary Wellingham / Ruth Levin / Nellie Burke

=== Recurring ===
- Sherilyn Fenn as Robyn Court
- Judith Light as Joan
- Alysia Reiner as Kathryn
- Susan Park as Valerie He (season 1)
- Derek Luh as Ryan He (season 1)
- Parvesh Cheena as Laird
- James M. Connor as Dr. Berg
- Ellie Grace Pomeroy as Daisy Wellingham
- Benjamin Steinberg as Neil
- Allison Tolman as Principal Woodcock (season 2)
- Alberto Frezza as Ennio (season 2)

== Episodes ==
Season	Episodes	Originally released	
Season	Episodes	First released	Last released
1	8	March 6, 2022	April 17, 2022
2	8	October 13, 2023	December 1, 2023

=== Season 1 (2022) ===
No. overall	No. in season	Title	Directed by	Written by	Original release date	U.S. viewers (millions)
1	1	"Chapter One – Welcome to Casa De Phelps"	Dearbhla Walsh	Story by : Sharon Horgan and Jeff Astrof; Teleplay by : Jeff Astrof	March 6, 2022	0.228
2	2	"Chapter Two – She Comes At Night"	Alethea Jones	Jeff Astrof	March 6, 2022	0.179
3	3	"Chapter Three – The Yellow Wallpaper"	Catriona McKenzie	Jill Blotevogel	March 13, 2022	0.139
4	4	"Chapter Four – So Much Blood"	Catriona McKenzie	Julieanne Smolinski	March 20, 2022	0.194
5	5	"Chapter Five – The Squirrel Knew"	Alethea Jones	Jeff Astrof	March 27, 2022	0.134
6	6	"Chapter Six – Whispering Hope"	Alethea Jones	Jill Blotevogel	April 3, 2022	0.131
7	7	"Chapter Seven – Impertinent Questions"	Liz Friedlander	Lindsay Golder	April 10, 2022	0.144
8	8	"Chapter Eight – We Are Phelps"	Liz Friedlander	Jeff Astrof	April 17, 2022	0.117

=== Season 2 (2023) ===
No. overall	No. in season	Title	Directed by	Written by	Original release date	U.S. viewers (millions)
9	1	"Chapter 9 – Homecoming"	Liz Friedlander	Jeff Astrof	October 13, 2023	0.104
10	2	"Chapter 10 – She's Real"	Liz Friedlander	Jill Blotevogel	October 20, 2023	0.112
11	3	"Chapter 11 – The Goat"	Catriona McKenzie	Julieanne Smolinski	October 27, 2023	0.084
12	4	"Chapter 12 – Smile"	Catriona McKenzie	Erin Maher & Kay Reindl	November 3, 2023	0.095
13	5	"Chapter 13 – The Miracle"	Aemilia Scott	Nora Nolan	November 10, 2023	0.075
14	6	"Chapter 14 – What's the Matter with Sandy?"	Mary Lambert	Albertina Rizzo	November 17, 2023	0.043
15	7	"Chapter 15 – Covens"	Daisy von Scherler Mayer	Brian Prodi Flynn	November 24, 2023	N/A
16	8	"Chapter 16 – Redemption"	Daisy von Scherler Mayer	Jeff Astrof	December 1, 2023	N/A

== Production ==
=== Development ===
In January 2018, it was announced that Showtime had put the project from Warner Bros. Television Studios in development with a pilot production commitment. Jeff Astrof and Sharon Horgan were set to write and create the series, as well as executive produce alongside Clelia Mountford for Horgan's production company Merman and Aaron Kaplan and Dana Honor of Kapital Entertainment. In August 2019, the project was given an official pilot order, with the series moving to Starz and Lionsgate Television joining as a co-production studio. In February 2020, Dearbhla Walsh was set to direct and executive produce the pilot. In April 2021, Starz gave the project a series order consisting of eight half hour episodes. In May 2022, Starz renewed the series for an eight-episode second season. In December 2023, Starz canceled the series after two seasons.

=== Casting ===
In February 2020, Courteney Cox was cast in the lead role. In July 2020, Greg Kinnear joined the main cast alongside Gus Birney and Dylan Gage who were added the following month. In February 2021, Mira Sorvino and Merrin Dungey were cast in main roles. In July 2021, Alysia Reiner was cast in a recurring role. The following month, Judith Light joined the main cast.

=== Filming ===
The pilot episode was filmed throughout March 2021 in Los Angeles. Once the show was greenlit, the rest of the season started shooting in July 2021. Production on season 2 started in October 2022.

== Reception ==
=== Critical response ===
On review aggregator website Rotten Tomatoes, the first season holds a 71% approval rating based on 24 critic reviews, with an average rating of 6.20/10. The website's critics consensus reads, "Shining Vale's uneasy mix of comedy and horror can be transparently try-hard, but Courteney Cox's saucy performance gives this genre mashup a glitter of promise." On Metacritic, the first season has a score of 61 out of 100, based on 16 critic reviews, indicating "generally favorable" reviews.

=== Awards and nominations ===
Award	Date of ceremony	Category	Nominee(s)	Result	Ref.
Saturn Awards	October 25, 2022	Best Fantasy Television Series: Network/Cable	Shining Vale	Won	
Saturn Awards	October 25, 2022	Best Actress in a Network or Cable Television Series	Courteney Cox	Nominated	
Saturn Awards	October 25, 2022	Best Performance by a Younger Actor in a Network or Cable Television Series	Gus Birney	Nominated	
