= Kimmy Gatewood =

American actress

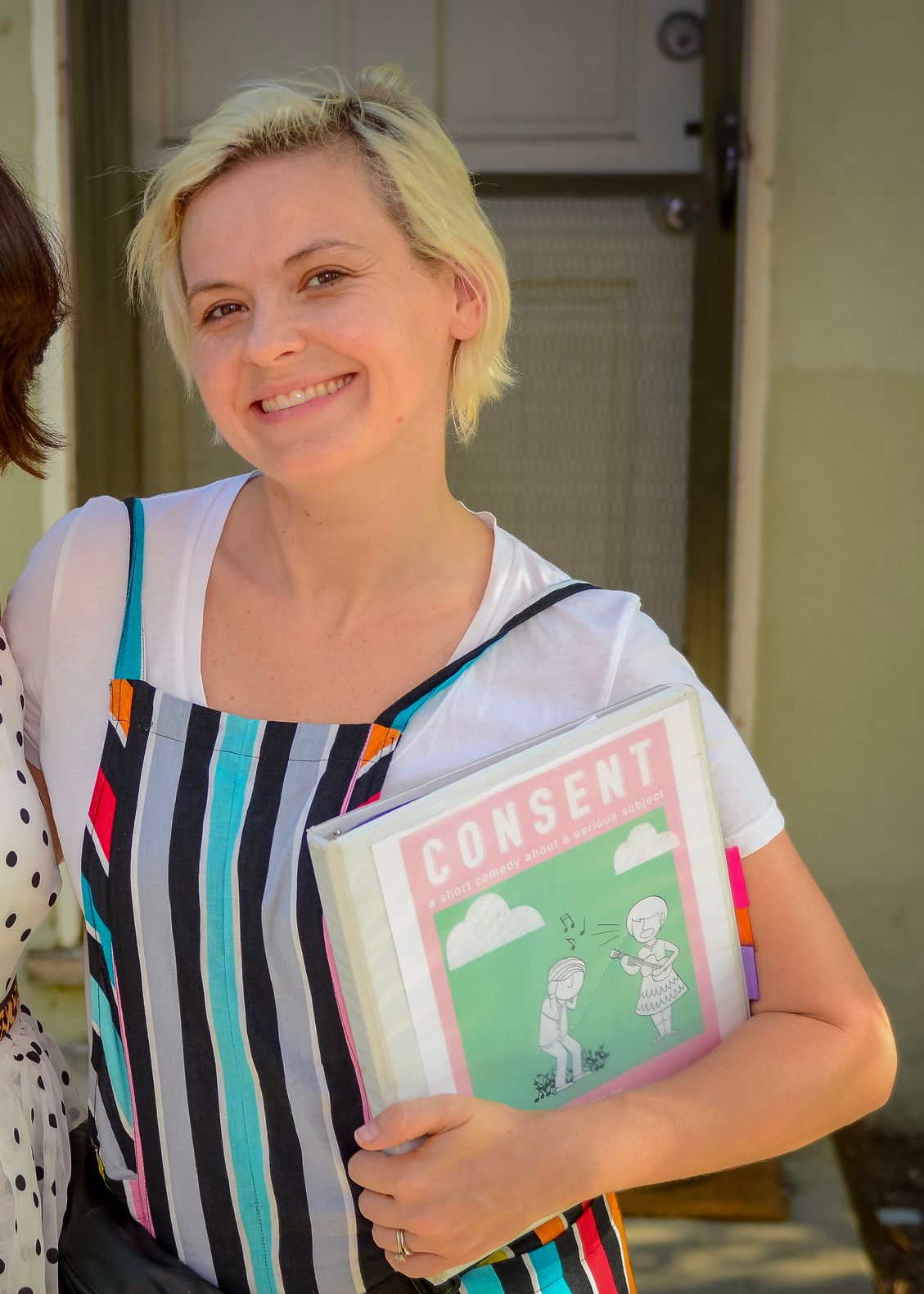
- Gatewood in 2018
- Born: Silver Spring, Maryland, U.S.
- Occupations: Actress; producer; director; singer
- Years active: 2002–present

Kimmy Gatewood is an American actress, director, writer, and singer.

Gatewood is a native of Silver Spring, Maryland, and was educated at Paint Branch High School. She has been in a long-running comedy duo with fellow GLOW actress Rebekka Johnson.

== The Apple Sisters ==
Gatewood is co-creator of The Apple Sisters, a World War II musical comedy trio. The group, which consists of herself, Rebekka Johnson, and Sarah Lowe, started in 2007 in New York City. They received critical acclaim at the 2008 Montreal Just For Laughs Comedy Festival, and moved the group to Los Angeles where they continue to perform.

== Filmography ==
=== As actor ===
==== Film ====
Year	Title	Role	Notes
2003	Ultrachrist!	Drunk Girl #1	
2014	Jersey Boys	Angel #1	
2015	Fun Size Horror: Volume One	Janice	Segment: "Bitter"
2015	Smosh: The Movie	Diri, Hairstylist	

==== Television ====
Year	Title	Role	Notes
2002	Porn 'n Chicken	Feminist	Television film
2011	The Boys & Girls Guide to Getting Down	Client	Television film
2011	Community	Glee Club Girl #2	Episode: "Regional Holiday Music"
2011–2019	Conan	Various characters	19 episodes
2012	Fred: The Show	Mrs. Kovack	3 episodes
2012	Don't Trust the B— in Apartment 23	Carol	Episode: "Sexy People..."
2012–2016	Epic Rap Battles of History	Hillary Clinton / Marilyn Monroe	2 episodes; also writer
2013–2014	Comedy Bang! Bang!	Bridesmaid / Vanity Halliday	2 episodes
2014	Trophy Wife	Ingrid	Episode: "The Big 5-0"
2014	Bad Judge	Kiki	2 episodes
2016	Crazy Ex-Girlfriend	Monrovia	Episode: "Josh and I Go to Los Angeles!"
2016	Foursome	Voicemail	2 episodes
2017	Comrade Detective	Sexy Nurse / Woman Holding Pants (voice)	Episode: "No Exit"
2017	A Christmas Story Live!	Cora Apple	Television special
2017–2019	GLOW	Stacey Beswick	29 episodes
2018	WWE SmackDown	Herself	Episode: "The Road to WWE Extreme Rules 2018 Begins"
2018–2021	Atypical	Coach Crowley	6 episodes
2019	American Dad!	Sue / Old Woman (voice)	3 episodes
2021	The Baby-Sitters Club	Ms. Katimski	Episode: "Stacey's Emergency"
2023	Mickey and Friends Trick or Treats	Ghost Bride (voice)	Television short

=== As director ===
==== Film ====
Year	Title	Notes
2008	Nerdcore Rising	Co-director
2021	Good on Paper	
2026	Descendants: Wicked Wonderland	

==== Television ====
Year	Title	Notes
2011	The Morning After	Episode #1.153
2017	Hyperlinked	5 episodes
2018	The Joel McHale Show with Joel McHale	2 episodes
2019	Crazy Ex-Girlfriend	Episode: "I Need Some Balance"
2020	Just Add Magic: Mystery City	Episode: "Just Add Volume"
2020	Sesame Street	Episode: "Holiday at Hoopers"
2020–2021	The Baby-Sitters Club	5 episodes
2020–2021	Helpsters	3 episodes
2021	The Big Leap	Episode: "Revenge Plot"
2021–2024	Girls5eva	10 episodes
2022	Home Economics	Episode: "Men's Water-Resistant Watch, $289"
2022	Ghosts	2 episodes
2022	Welcome to Flatch	2 episodes
2022–2023	Single Drunk Female	2 episodes
2023	Up Here	2 episodes
2023	The Muppets Mayhem	3 episodes
2023	Survival of the Thickest	2 episodes
2024	The Chicken Sisters	2 episodes
2025–2026	Going Dutch	6 episodes
