= 75th Golden Globe Awards =

US film and TV award ceremony in 2018

- Official poster
- Date: January 7, 2018
- Site: The Beverly Hilton, Beverly Hills, California, U.S.
- Hosted by: Seth Meyers

Highlights
- Best Film: Drama: Three Billboards Outside Ebbing, Missouri
- Best Film: Musical or Comedy: Lady Bird
- Best Drama Series: The Handmaid's Tale
- Best Musical or Comedy Series: The Marvelous Mrs. Maisel
- Best Miniseries or Television movie: Big Little Lies
- Most awards: Three Billboards Outside Ebbing, Missouri; Big Little Lies (4)
- Most nominations: The Shape of Water (7)

Television coverage
- Network: NBC

The 75th Golden Globe Awards honored film and American television of 2017, and was broadcast live on January 7, 2018, from The Beverly Hilton in Beverly Hills, California beginning at 5:00 p.m. PST / 8:00 p.m. EST by NBC. This Golden Globe Awards ceremony was produced by Dick Clark Productions in association with the Hollywood Foreign Press Association.

Talk-show host Seth Meyers hosted the ceremony for the first time. Oprah Winfrey was announced as Cecil B. DeMille Lifetime Achievement Award honoree on December 13, 2017. The nominees were announced on December 11, 2017, by Sharon Stone, Alfre Woodard, Kristen Bell and Garrett Hedlund.

Three Billboards Outside Ebbing, Missouri won the most awards for the evening with four, including Best Motion Picture – Drama. The Shape of Water and Lady Bird won two awards each. Big Little Lies, The Handmaid's Tale, and The Marvelous Mrs. Maisel were among the television shows that received multiple awards.

== Winners and nominees ==
The nominees for 75th Golden Globe Awards were announced on December 11, 2017. Winners are listed first in boldface.

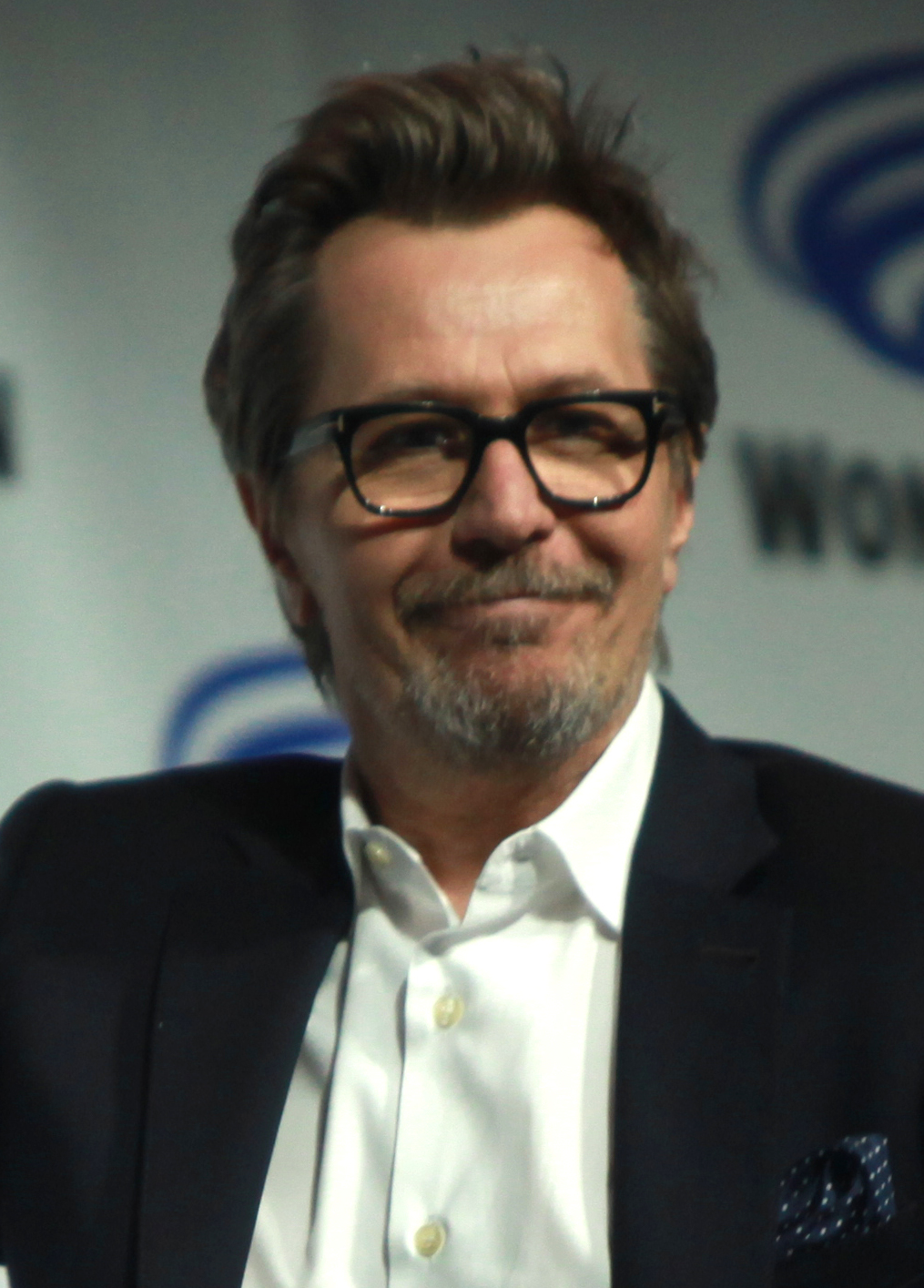
Gary Oldman, Best Actor in a Motion Picture – Drama winner

Frances McDormand, Best Actress in a Motion Picture – Drama winner

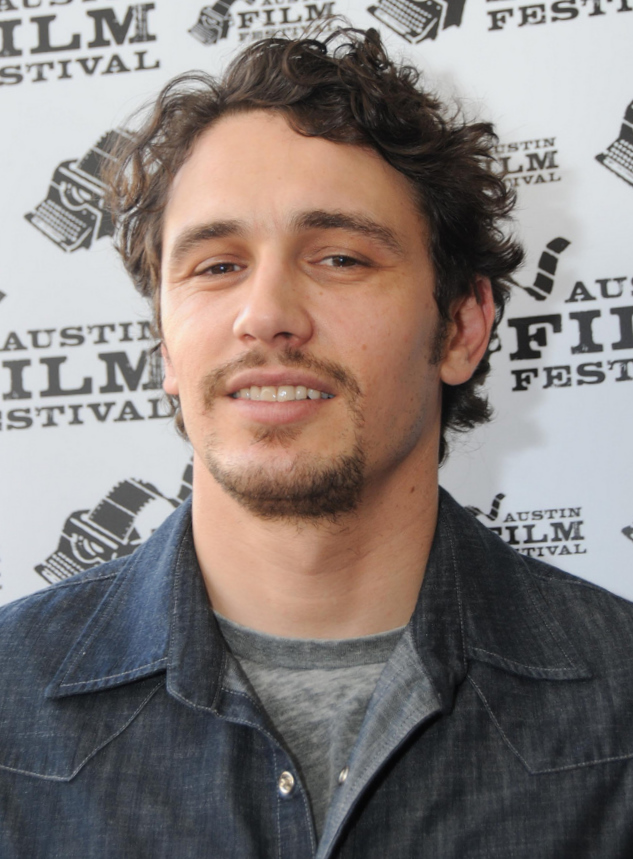
James Franco, Best Actor in a Motion Picture – Musical or Comedy winner

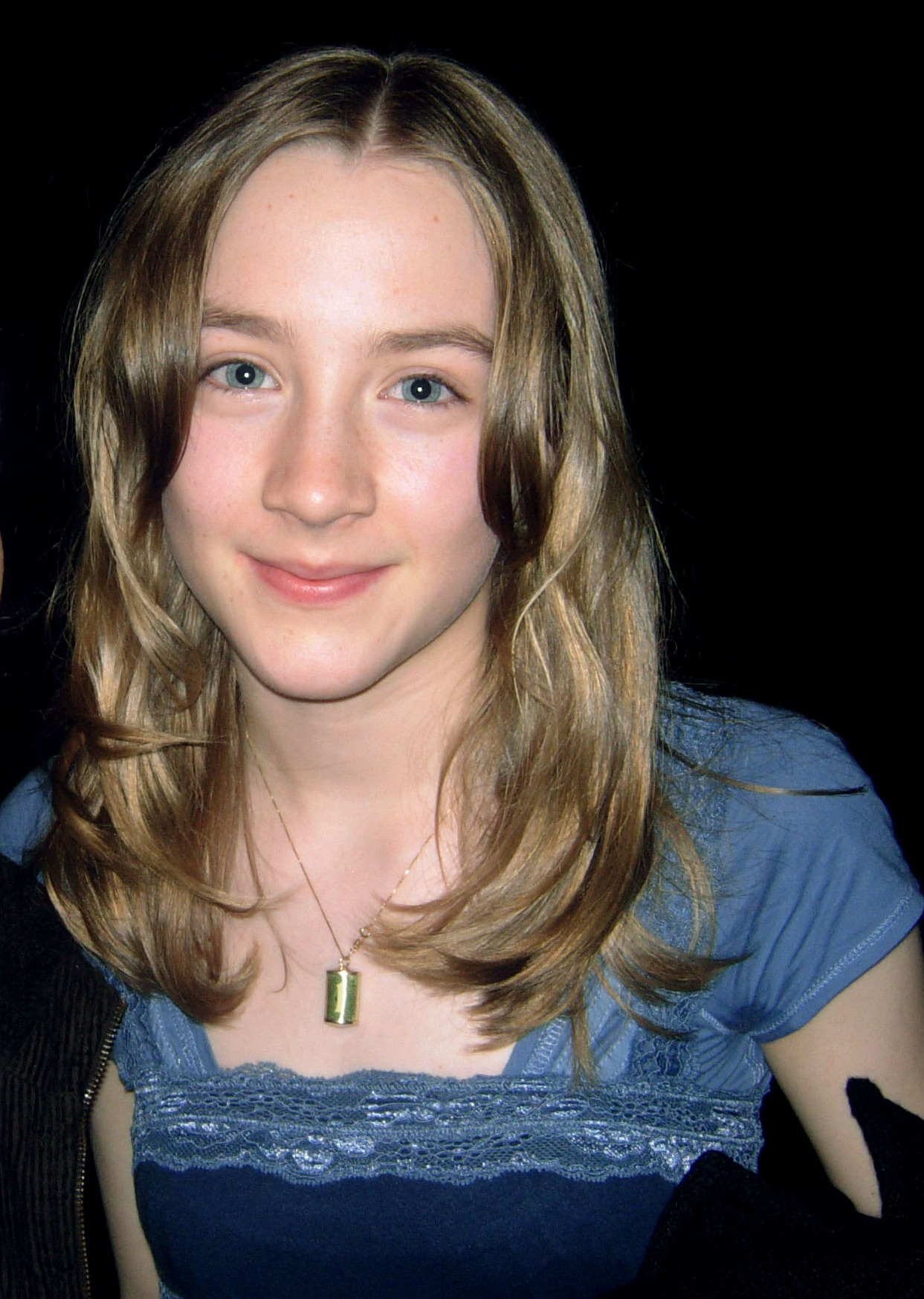
Saoirse Ronan, Best Actress in a Motion Picture – Musical or Comedy winner

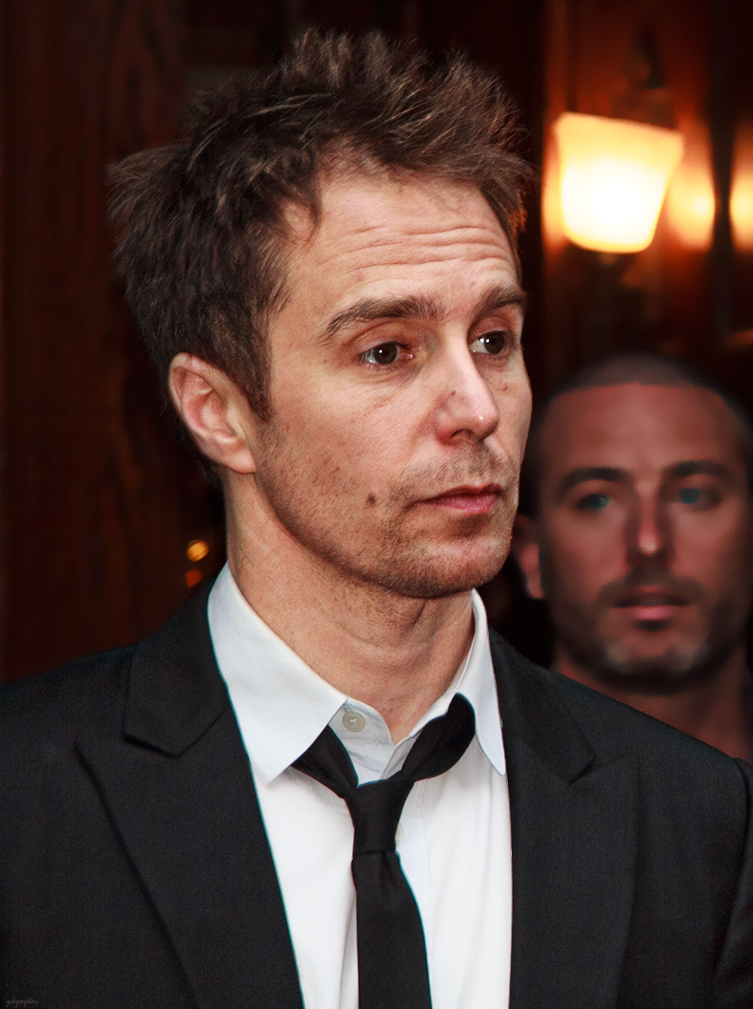
Sam Rockwell, Best Supporting Actor winner

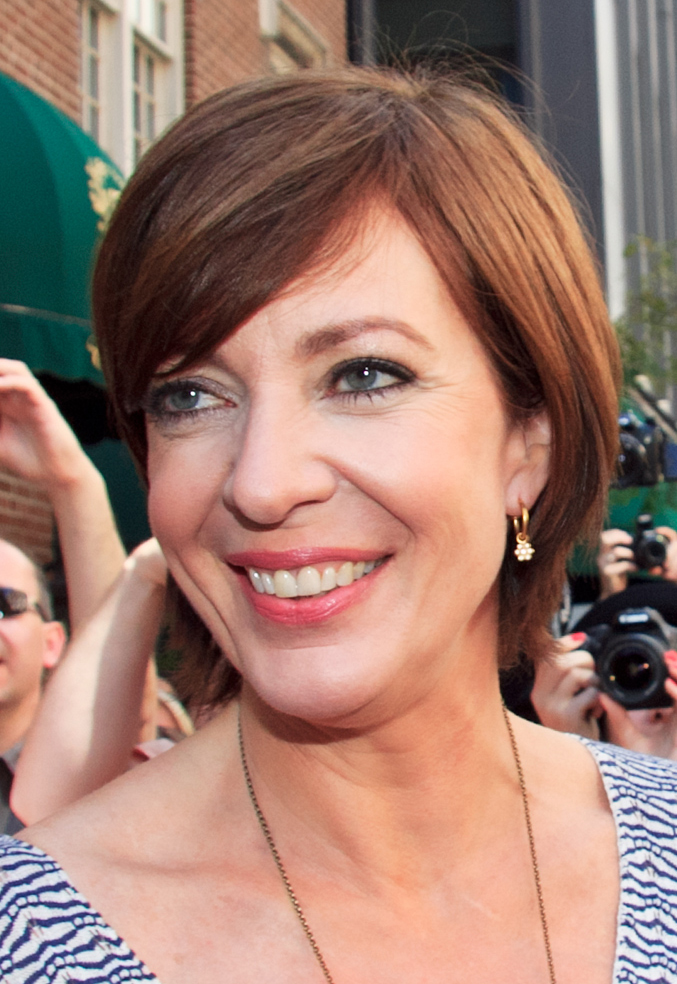
Allison Janney, Best Supporting Actress winner

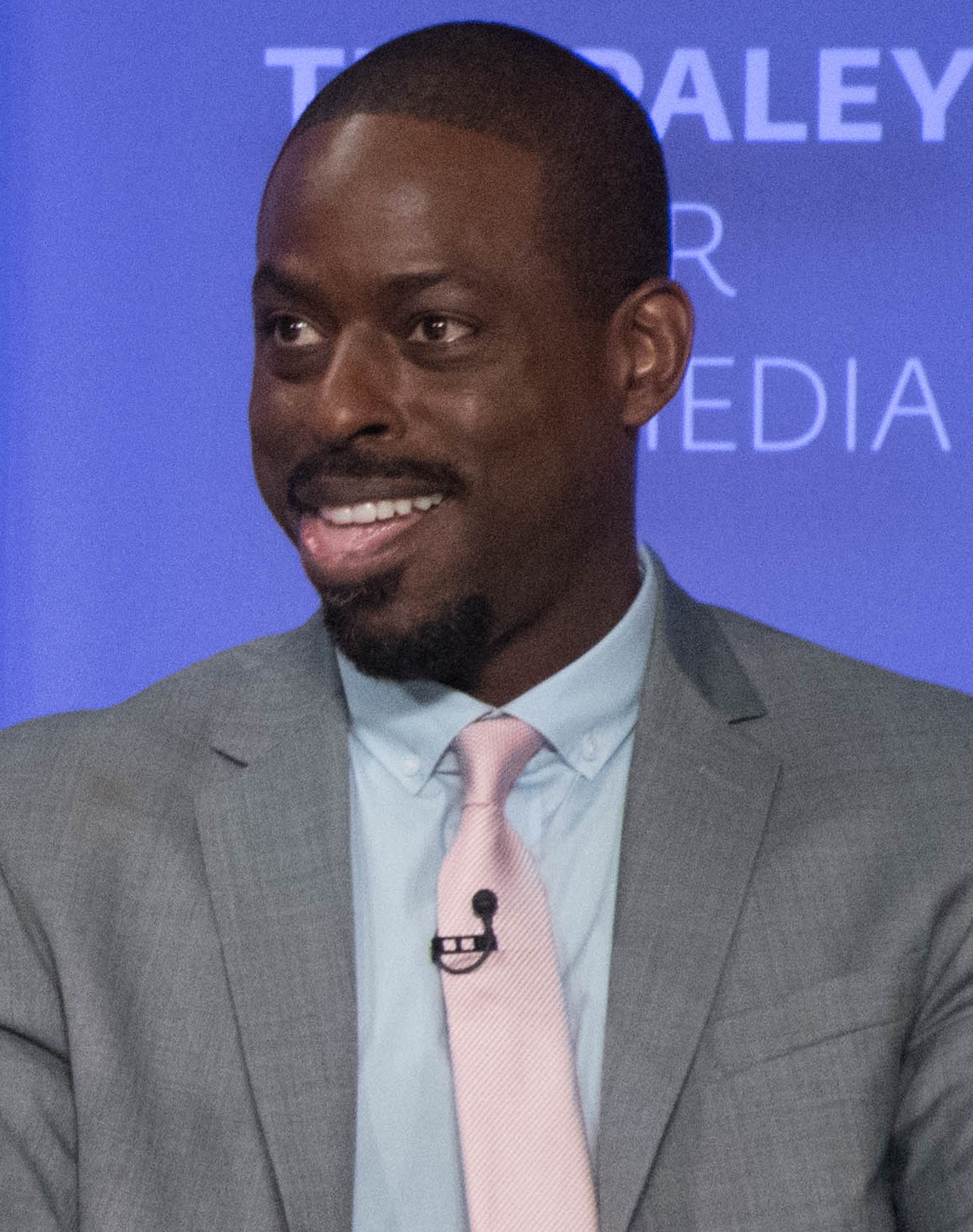
Sterling K. Brown, Best Actor in a Television Series – Drama winner

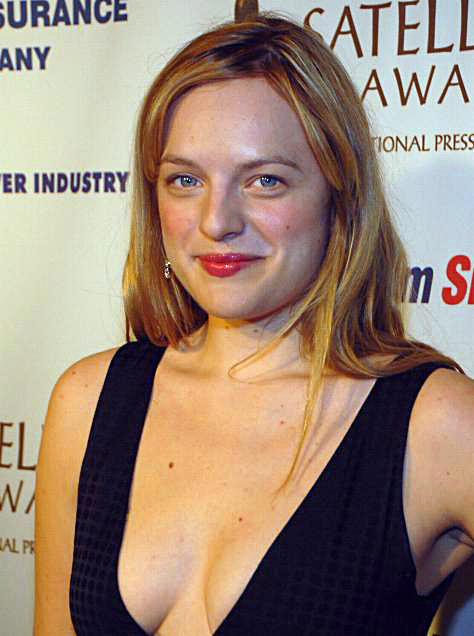
Elisabeth Moss, Best Actress in a Television Series – Drama winner

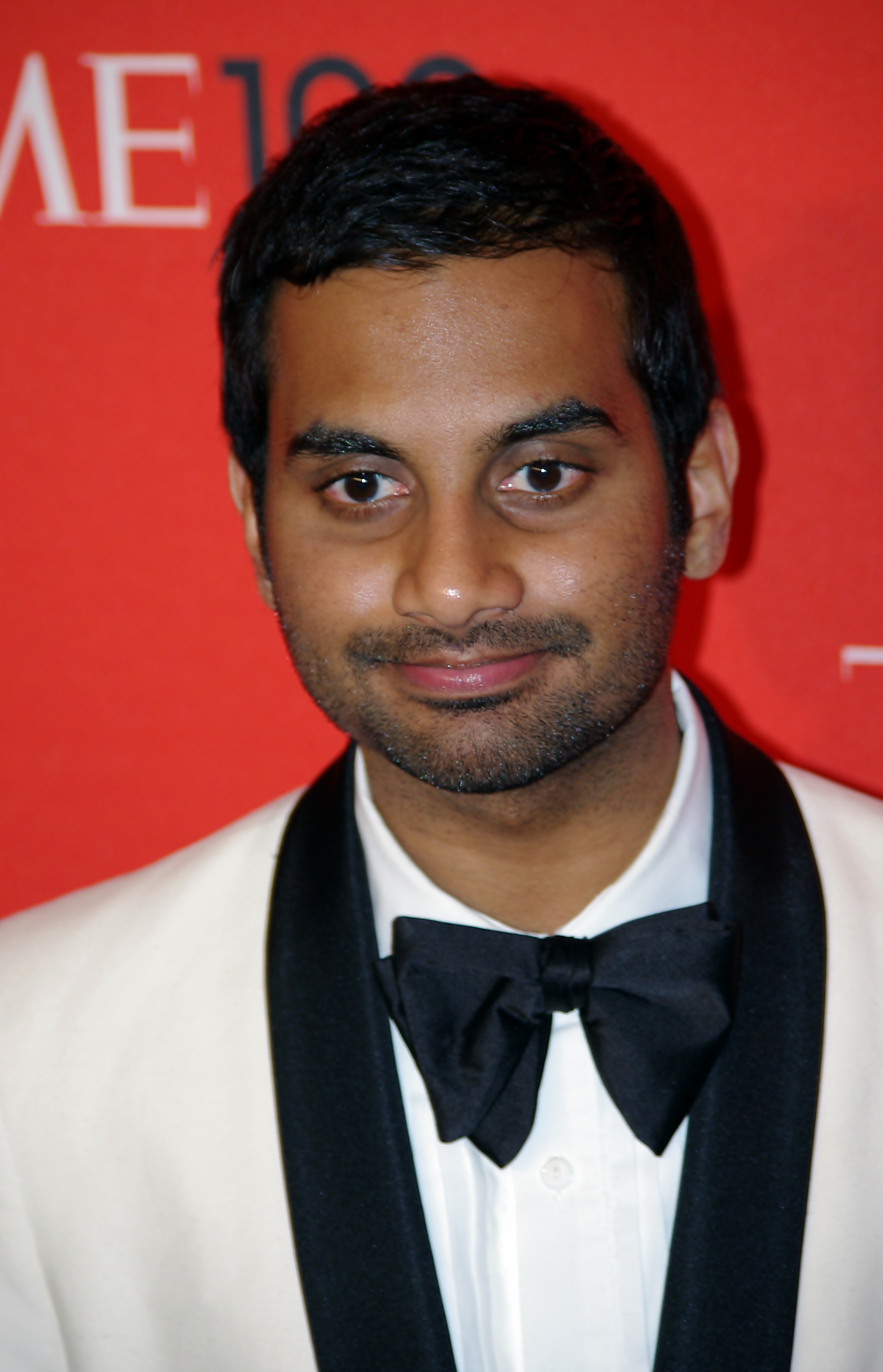
Aziz Ansari, Best Actor in a Television Series – Comedy or Musical winner

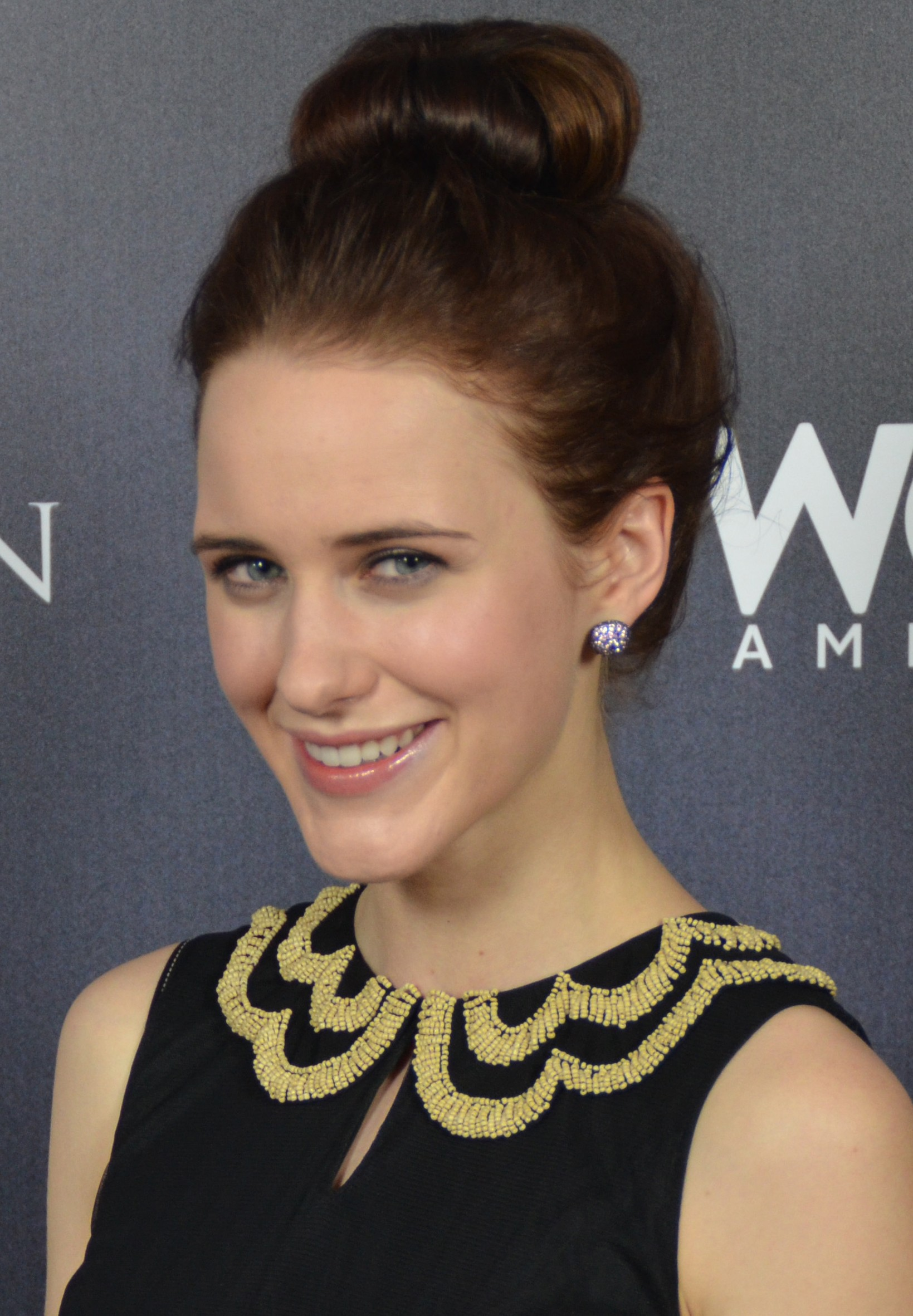
Rachel Brosnahan, Best Actress in a Television Series – Comedy or Musical winner

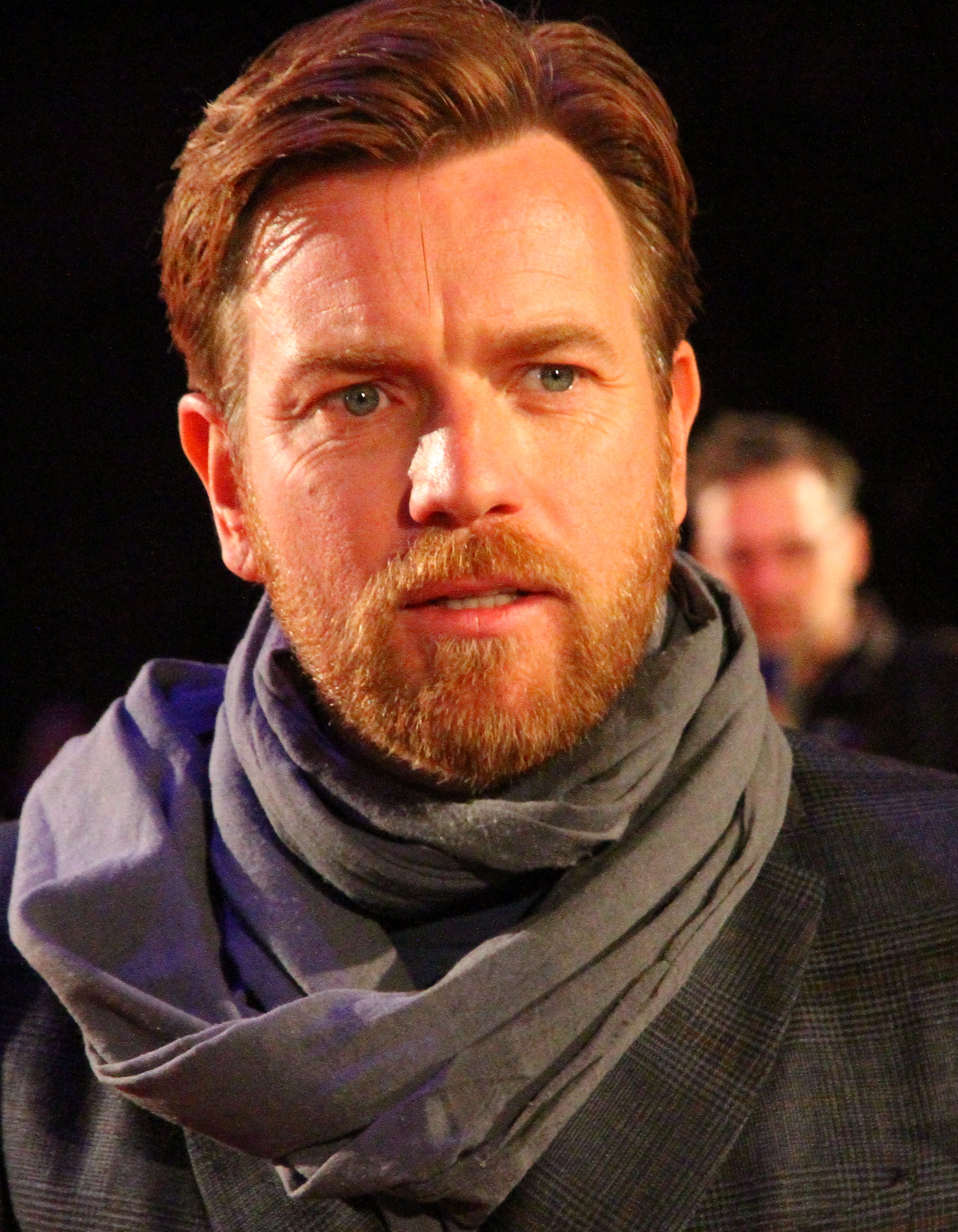
Ewan McGregor, Best Actor in a Miniseries or Television Film winner

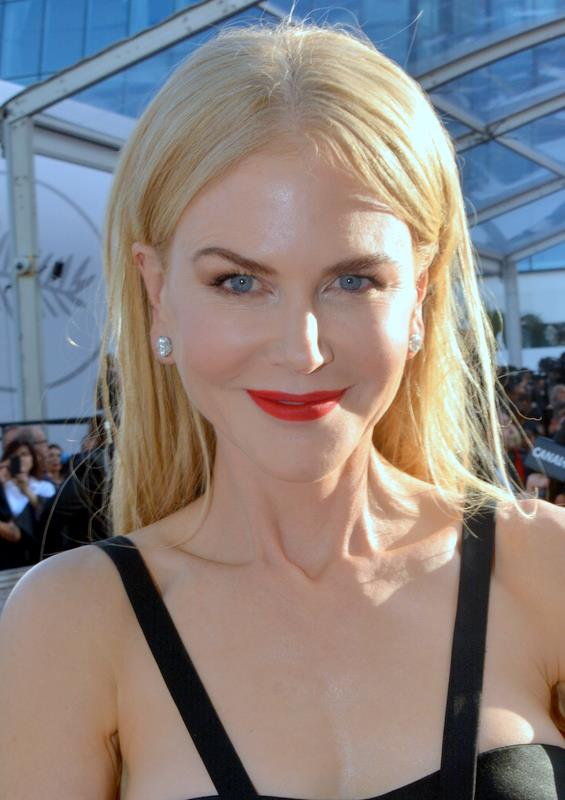
Nicole Kidman, Best Actress in a Miniseries or Television Film winner

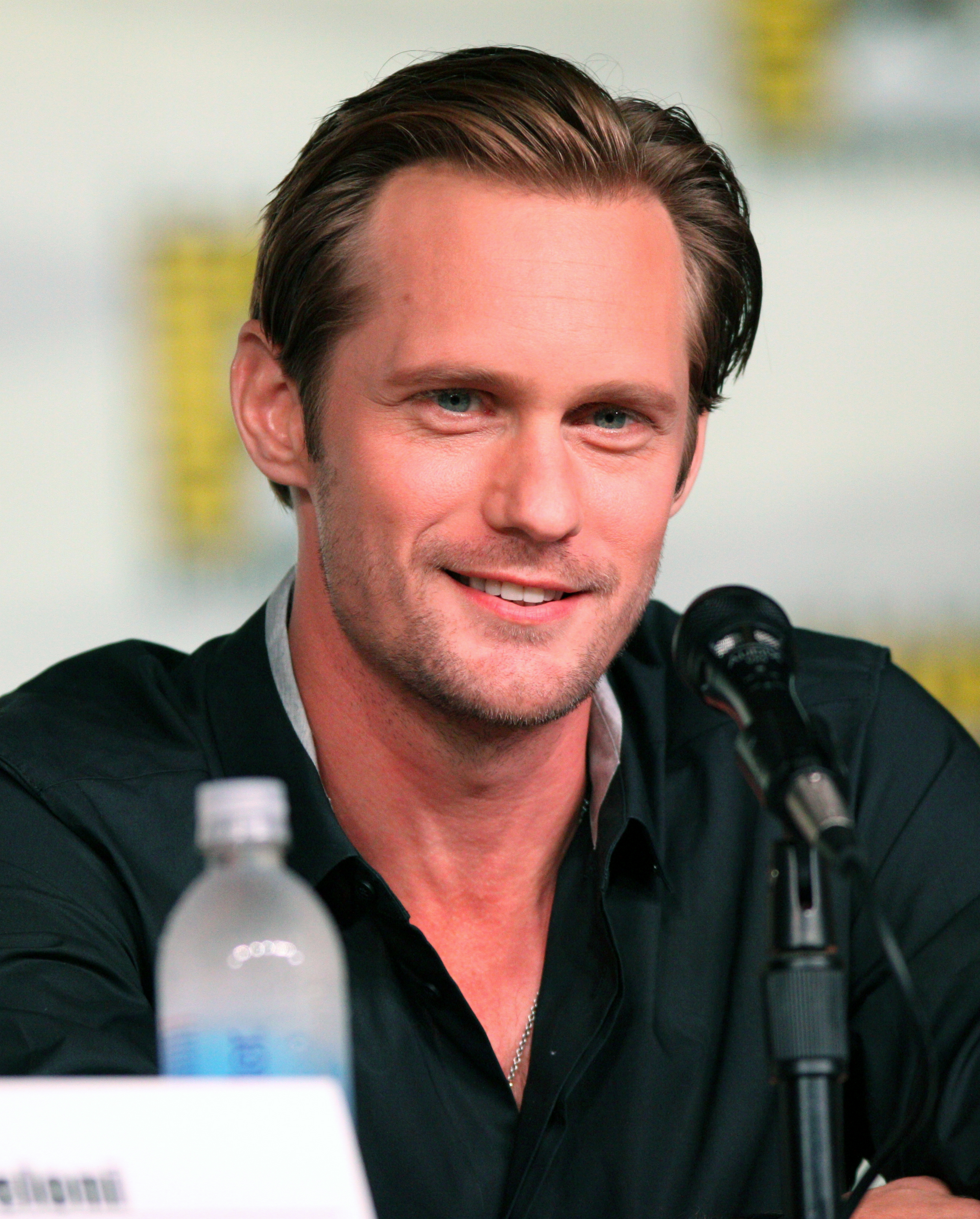
Alexander Skarsgård, Best Supporting Actor in a Series, Miniseries, or Television Film winner

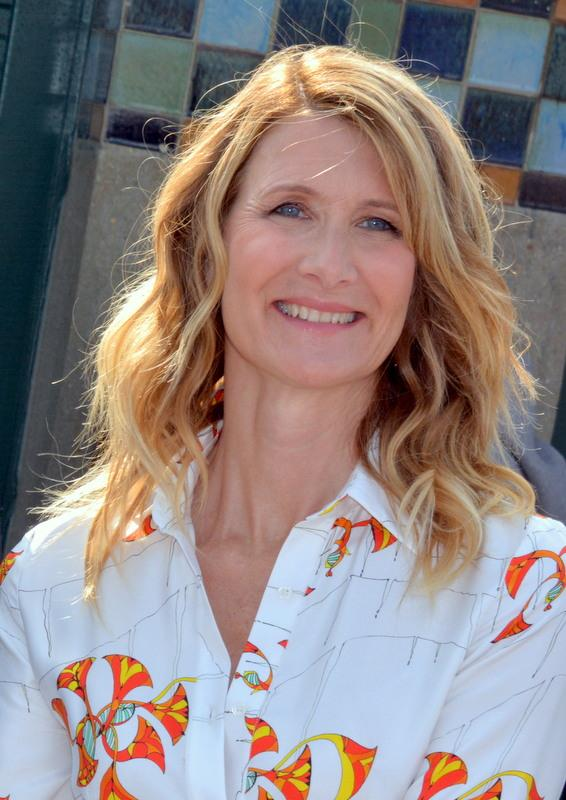
Laura Dern, Best Supporting Actress in a Series, Miniseries, or Television Film winner

=== Film ===
Best Motion Picture
Drama	Musical or Comedy
**Three Billboards Outside Ebbing, Missouri**; Call Me by Your Name; Dunkirk; The Post; The Shape of Water	**Lady Bird**; The Disaster Artist; Get Out; The Greatest Showman; I, Tonya
Best Performance in a Motion Picture – Drama
Actor	Actress
**Gary Oldman – Darkest Hour as Winston Churchill**; Timothée Chalamet – Call Me by Your Name as Elio Perlman; Daniel Day-Lewis – Phantom Thread as Reynolds Woodcock; Tom Hanks – The Post as Ben Bradlee; Denzel Washington – Roman J. Israel, Esq. as Roman J. Israel	**Frances McDormand – Three Billboards Outside Ebbing, Missouri as Mildred Hayes**; Jessica Chastain – Molly's Game as Molly Bloom; Sally Hawkins – The Shape of Water as Elisa Esposito; Meryl Streep – The Post as Katharine Graham; Michelle Williams – All the Money in the World as Gail Harris
Best Performance in a Motion Picture – Musical or Comedy
Actor	Actress
**James Franco – The Disaster Artist as Tommy Wiseau**; Steve Carell – Battle of the Sexes as Bobby Riggs; Ansel Elgort – Baby Driver as Miles "Baby"; Hugh Jackman – The Greatest Showman as P. T. Barnum; Daniel Kaluuya – Get Out as Chris Washington	**Saoirse Ronan – Lady Bird as Christine "Lady Bird" McPherson**; Judi Dench – Victoria & Abdul as Queen Victoria; Helen Mirren – The Leisure Seeker as Ella Spencer; Margot Robbie – I, Tonya as Tonya Harding; Emma Stone – Battle of the Sexes as Billie Jean King
Best Supporting Performance in a Motion Picture – Drama, Musical or Comedy
Supporting Actor	Supporting Actress
**Sam Rockwell – Three Billboards Outside Ebbing, Missouri as Officer Jason Dixon**; Willem Dafoe – The Florida Project as Bobby Hicks; Armie Hammer – Call Me by Your Name as Oliver; Richard Jenkins – The Shape of Water as Giles; Christopher Plummer – All the Money in the World as J. Paul Getty	**Allison Janney – I, Tonya as LaVona Golden**; Mary J. Blige – Mudbound as Florence Jackson; Hong Chau – Downsizing as Ngoc Lan Tran; Laurie Metcalf – Lady Bird as Marion McPherson; Octavia Spencer – The Shape of Water as Zelda Fuller
Other
Best Director	Best Screenplay
**Guillermo del Toro – The Shape of Water**; Martin McDonagh – Three Billboards Outside Ebbing, Missouri; Christopher Nolan – Dunkirk; Ridley Scott – All the Money in the World; Steven Spielberg – The Post	**Martin McDonagh – Three Billboards Outside Ebbing, Missouri**; Guillermo del Toro and Vanessa Taylor – The Shape of Water; Greta Gerwig – Lady Bird; Liz Hannah and Josh Singer – The Post; Aaron Sorkin – Molly's Game
Best Original Score	Best Original Song
**Alexandre Desplat – The Shape of Water**; Carter Burwell – Three Billboards Outside Ebbing, Missouri; Jonny Greenwood – Phantom Thread; John Williams – The Post; Hans Zimmer – Dunkirk	**"This Is Me" (Benj Pasek and Justin Paul) – The Greatest Showman**; "Home" (Nick Jonas, Justin Tranter, and Nick Monson) – Ferdinand; "Mighty River" (Raphael Saadiq, Mary J. Blige, and Taura Stinson) – Mudbound; "Remember Me" (Kristen Anderson-Lopez and Robert Lopez) – Coco; "The Star" (Mariah Carey and Marc Shaiman) – The Star
Best Animated Feature Film	Best Foreign Language Film
**Coco**; The Boss Baby; The Breadwinner; Ferdinand; Loving Vincent	**In the Fade (Germany/France)**; A Fantastic Woman (Chile); First They Killed My Father (Cambodia); Loveless (Russia); The Square (Sweden/Germany/France)

=== Films with multiple nominations ===
The following seventeen films received multiple nominations:

Nominations	Films	Ref.
7	The Shape of Water	
6	The Post	
6	Three Billboards Outside Ebbing, Missouri	
4	Lady Bird	
3	All the Money in the World	
3	Call Me by Your Name	
3	Dunkirk	
3	The Greatest Showman	
3	I, Tonya	
2	Battle of the Sexes	
2	Coco	
2	The Disaster Artist	
2	Ferdinand	
2	Get Out	
2	Molly's Game	
2	Mudbound	
2	Phantom Thread	

=== Films with multiple wins ===
The following films received multiple wins:

Wins	Film	Ref.
4	Three Billboards Outside Ebbing, Missouri	
2	Lady Bird	
2	The Shape of Water	

=== Television ===
Best Series
Drama	Musical or Comedy
**The Handmaid's Tale (Hulu)**; The Crown (Netflix); Game of Thrones (HBO); Stranger Things (Netflix); This Is Us (NBC)	**The Marvelous Mrs. Maisel (Amazon Prime Video)**; Black-ish (ABC); Master of None (Netflix); SMILF (Showtime); Will & Grace (NBC)
Best Performance in a Television Series – Drama
Actor	Actress
**Sterling K. Brown – This Is Us (NBC) as Randall Pearson**; Jason Bateman – Ozark (Netflix) as Martin "Marty" Byrde; Freddie Highmore – The Good Doctor (ABC) as Dr. Shaun Murphy; Bob Odenkirk – Better Call Saul (AMC) as Jimmy McGill; Liev Schreiber – Ray Donovan (Showtime) as Ray Donovan	**Elisabeth Moss – The Handmaid's Tale (Hulu) as June Osborne / Offred**; Caitríona Balfe – Outlander (Starz) as Claire Fraser; Claire Foy – The Crown (Netflix) as Queen Elizabeth II; Maggie Gyllenhaal – The Deuce (HBO) as Eileen "Candy" Merrell; Katherine Langford – 13 Reasons Why (Netflix) as Hannah Baker
Best Performance in a Television Series – Musical or Comedy
Actor	Actress
**Aziz Ansari – Master of None (Netflix) as Dev Shah**; Anthony Anderson – Black-ish (ABC) as Andre "Dre" Johnson, Sr.; Kevin Bacon – I Love Dick (Prime Video) as Dick; William H. Macy – Shameless (Showtime) as Frank Gallagher; Eric McCormack – Will & Grace (NBC) as Will Truman	**Rachel Brosnahan – The Marvelous Mrs. Maisel (Prime Video) as Miriam "Midge" Maisel**; Pamela Adlon – Better Things (FX) as Sam Fox; Alison Brie – GLOW (Netflix) as Ruth "Zoya the Destroya" Wilder; Issa Rae – Insecure (HBO) as Issa Dee; Frankie Shaw – SMILF (Showtime) as Bridgette Bird
Best Performance in a Miniseries or Television Film
Actor	Actress
**Ewan McGregor – Fargo (FX) as Emmit and Ray Stussy**; Robert De Niro – The Wizard of Lies (HBO) as Bernie Madoff; Jude Law – The Young Pope (HBO) as Pope Pius XIII; Kyle MacLachlan – Twin Peaks (Showtime) as Dale Cooper; Geoffrey Rush – Genius (National Geographic) as Albert Einstein	**Nicole Kidman – Big Little Lies (HBO) as Celeste Wright**; Jessica Biel – The Sinner (USA Network) as Cora Tannetti; Jessica Lange – Feud: Bette and Joan (FX) as Joan Crawford; Susan Sarandon – Feud: Bette and Joan (FX) as Bette Davis; Reese Witherspoon – Big Little Lies (HBO) as Madeline Martha Mackenzie
Best Supporting Performance in a Series, Miniseries or Television Film
Supporting Actor	Supporting Actress
**Alexander Skarsgård – Big Little Lies (HBO) as Perry Wright**; David Harbour – Stranger Things (Netflix) as Jim Hopper; Alfred Molina – Feud: Bette and Joan (FX) as Robert Aldrich; Christian Slater – Mr. Robot (USA Network) as Mr. Robot / Edward Alderson; David Thewlis – Fargo (FX) as V. M. Varga	**Laura Dern – Big Little Lies (HBO) as Renata Klein**; Ann Dowd – The Handmaid's Tale (Hulu) as Aunt Lydia; Chrissy Metz – This Is Us (NBC) as Kate Pearson; Michelle Pfeiffer – The Wizard of Lies (HBO) as Ruth Madoff; Shailene Woodley – Big Little Lies (HBO) as Jane Chapman
Best Miniseries or Television Film
**Big Little Lies (HBO)**; Fargo (FX); Feud: Bette and Joan (FX); The Sinner (USA Network); Top of the Lake: China Girl (SundanceTV)

=== Series with multiple nominations ===
The following fourteen series received multiple nominations:

Nominations	Series	Ref.
6	Big Little Lies	
4	Feud: Bette and Joan	
3	Fargo	
3	The Handmaid's Tale	
3	This Is Us	
2	Black-ish	
2	The Crown	
2	The Marvelous Mrs. Maisel	
2	Master of None	
2	The Sinner	
2	SMILF	
2	Stranger Things	
2	Will & Grace	

=== Series with multiple wins ===
The following three series received multiple wins:

Wins	Series	Ref.
4	Big Little Lies	
2	The Handmaid's Tale	
2	The Marvelous Mrs. Maisel	

== Ceremony ==
During a pre-show event the award for "Best Podcast" was announced. The event was streamed live on YouTube. In support of the #MeToo and Time's Up movements, practically all the attendees wore black. Many of the acceptance speeches specifically mentioned these causes, including that of Oprah Winfrey.

=== Presenters ===
- Gal Gadot and Dwayne Johnson with Best Actress – Miniseries or Television Film
- Viola Davis and Helen Mirren with Best Supporting Actor – Motion Picture
- Zac Efron introduced The Greatest Showman
- Jennifer Aniston and Carol Burnett with Best Actress – Television Series Musical or Comedy and Best Actress – Television Series Drama
- Sarah Paulson introduced The Post
- Garrett Hedlund and Kerry Washington with Best Actor – Television Series Drama
- Roseanne Barr and John Goodman with Best Television Series – Drama
- Seth Rogen introduced The Disaster Artist
- Christina Hendricks and Neil Patrick Harris with Best Supporting Actor – Series, Miniseries or Television Film
- Mariah Carey and Common with Best Original Score
- Kelly Clarkson and Keith Urban with Best Original Song
- Octavia Spencer introduced The Shape of Water
- Emma Stone and Shirley MacLaine with Best Actor – Motion Picture Musical or Comedy
- Sharon Stone and J. K. Simmons with Best Supporting Actress – Series, Miniseries or Television Film
- Sebastian Stan and Allison Janney introduced I, Tonya
- Amy Poehler and Andy Samberg with Best Animated Feature Film
- Kate Hudson and Aaron Taylor-Johnson with Best Supporting Actress – Motion Picture
- Catherine Zeta-Jones and Kirk Douglas with Best Screenplay
- Sarah Jessica Parker with Best Foreign Language Film
- Hugh Grant introduced Dunkirk
- Darren Criss, Penélope Cruz, Ricky Martin, and Édgar Ramírez with Best Actor – Miniseries or Television Film
- Halle Berry introduced Get Out
- Emilia Clarke and Kit Harington with Best Television Series – Musical or Comedy and Best Actor – Television Series Musical or Comedy
- Reese Witherspoon with the Cecil B. DeMille Lifetime Achievement Award
- Natalie Portman and Ron Howard with Best Director
- Greta Gerwig introduced Lady Bird
- Emma Watson and Robert Pattinson with Best Miniseries or Television Film
- Jessica Chastain and Chris Hemsworth with Best Actress – Motion Picture Comedy or Musical
- Dakota Johnson introduced Call Me by Your Name
- Salma Hayek introduced Three Billboards Outside Ebbing, Missouri
- Alicia Vikander and Michael Keaton with Best Motion Picture – Musical or Comedy
- Geena Davis and Susan Sarandon with Best Actor – Motion Picture Drama
- Isabelle Huppert and Angelina Jolie with Best Actress in a Motion Picture – Drama
- Barbra Streisand with Best Motion Picture – Drama

=== Golden Globe Ambassador ===
Previously known as Miss or Mr. Golden Globe, the title was changed this ceremony to Golden Globe Ambassador to better reflect inclusiveness. The inaugural ambassador was Simone Garcia Johnson, daughter of Dwayne Johnson and Dany Garcia.

=== Time's Up movement ===
Due to the Weinstein effect, many attendees wore black in support of the Time's Up movement, and wore corresponding #MeToo pins. Tarana Burke, who created the "Me too" movement in 2006, attended the awards as a guest of Michelle Williams.

=== Activist guests ===
Activists attended the ceremony as guests, namely: Tarana Burke as a guest of Michelle Williams, Rosa Clemente as a guest of Susan Sarandon, Saru Jayaraman as a guest of Amy Poehler, Billie Jean King as a guest of Emma Stone, Marai Larasi as a guest of Emma Watson, Calina Lawrence as a guest of Shailene Woodley, Ai-jen Poo as a guest of Meryl Streep, and Mónica Ramírez as a guest of Laura Dern.

== Reception ==
=== Ratings ===
The ceremony averaged a Nielsen 5.0 ratings/18 share, and was watched by 19.0 million viewers. The ratings was a five percent decline from the previous ceremony's viewership of 20.02 million, becoming the lowest since 2012.

== In Memoriam ==
No "In Memoriam" section was broadcast on television during the ceremony, so the HFPA included a slideshow on their website, and they included the following names:

- Jerry Lewis
- Glen Campbell
- Jeanne Moreau
- Martin Landau
- John G. Avildsen
- Roger Moore
- Jonathan Demme
- Christine Kaufmann
- Richard Hatch
- John Hurt
- Mike Connors
- Mary Tyler Moore
- Michèle Morgan
- William Peter Blatty

== See also ==
- 90th Academy Awards
- 45th Annie Awards
- 23rd Critics' Choice Awards
- 71st British Academy Film Awards
- 38th Golden Raspberry Awards
- 21st Hollywood Film Awards
- 33rd Independent Spirit Awards
- 22nd Satellite Awards
- 24th Screen Actors Guild Awards
