= Florida Film Critics Circle Awards 2017 =

Annual US film awards ceremony

22nd FFCC Awards

December 23, 2017

Best Picture:
Dunkirk

The 22nd Florida Film Critics Circle Awards were held on December 23, 2017.

The nominations were announced on December 20, 2017, led by The Shape of Water with nine nominations.

== Winners and nominees ==
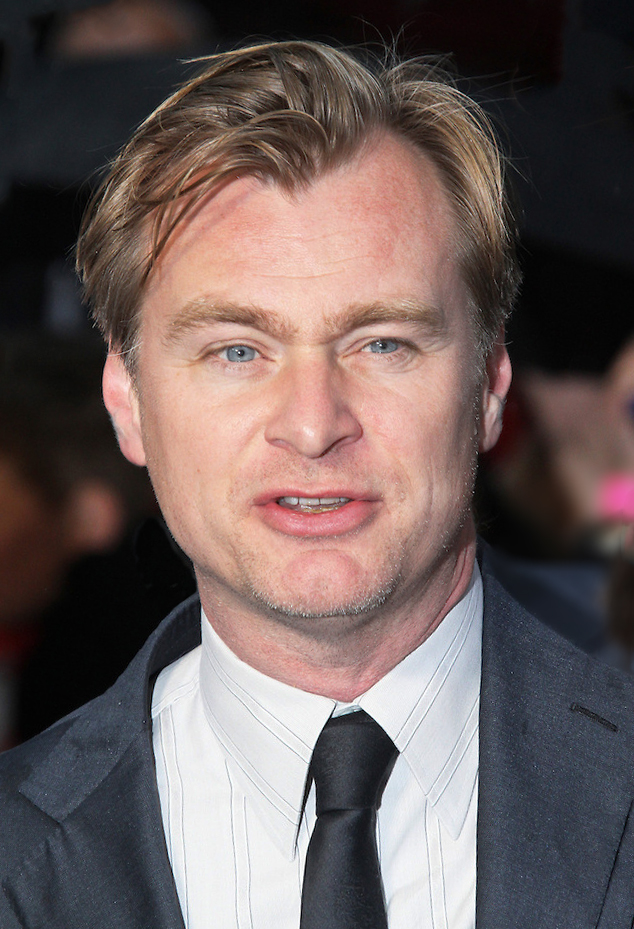
Christopher Nolan, Best Director winner

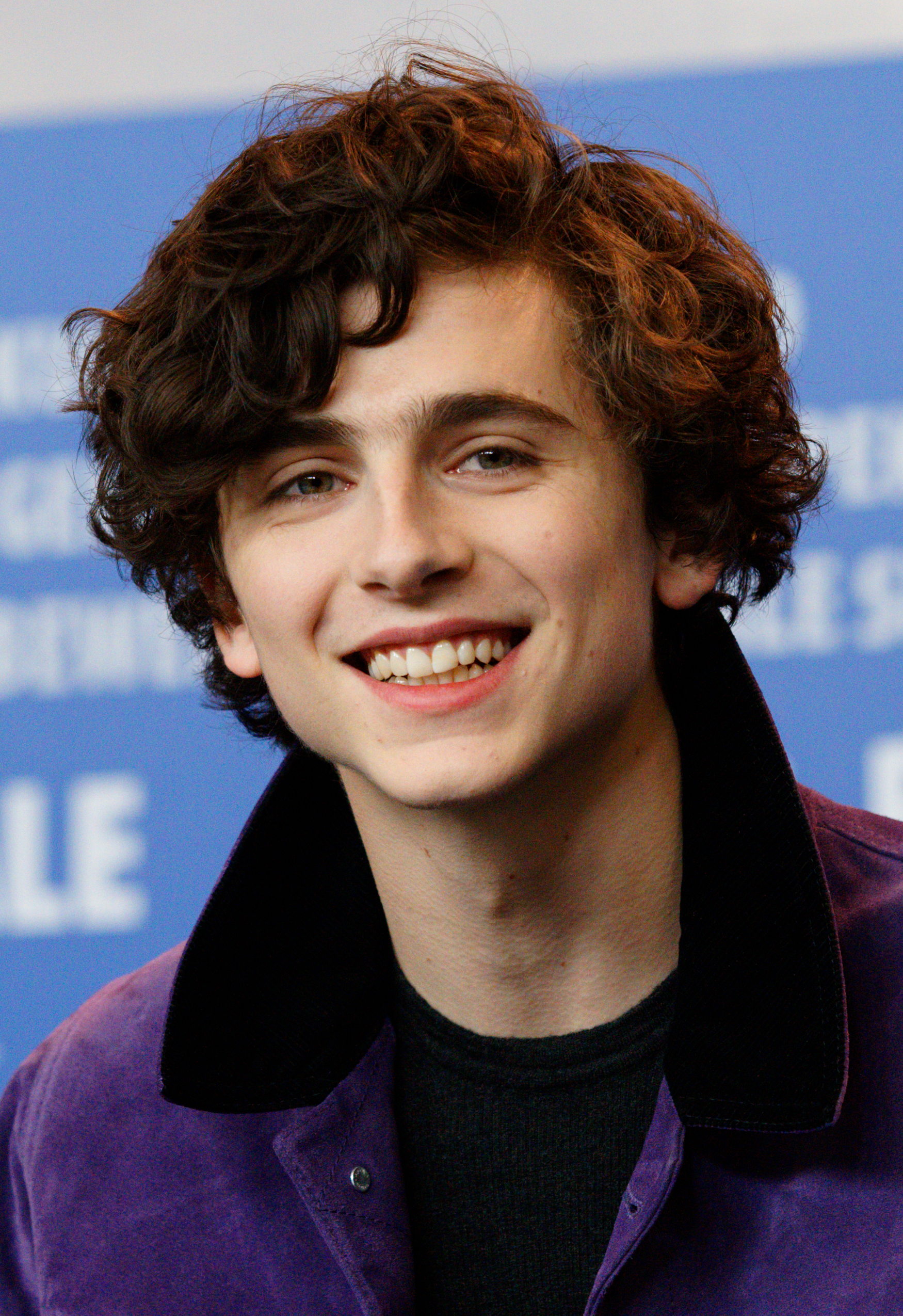
Timothée Chalamet, Best Actor and Pauline Kael Breakout Award winner

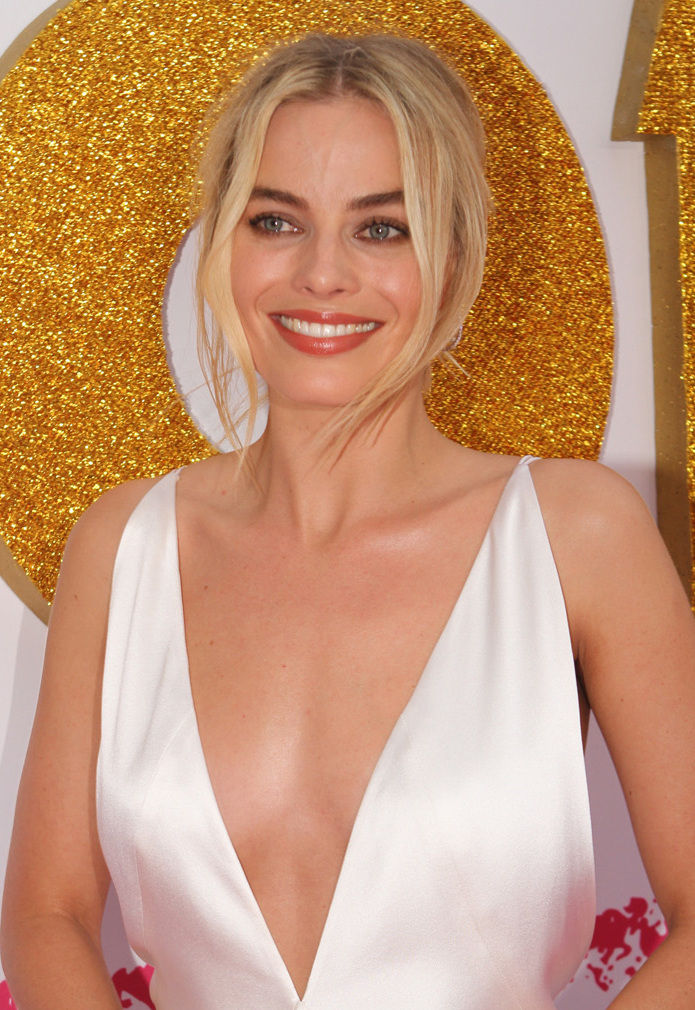
Margot Robbie, Best Actress winner

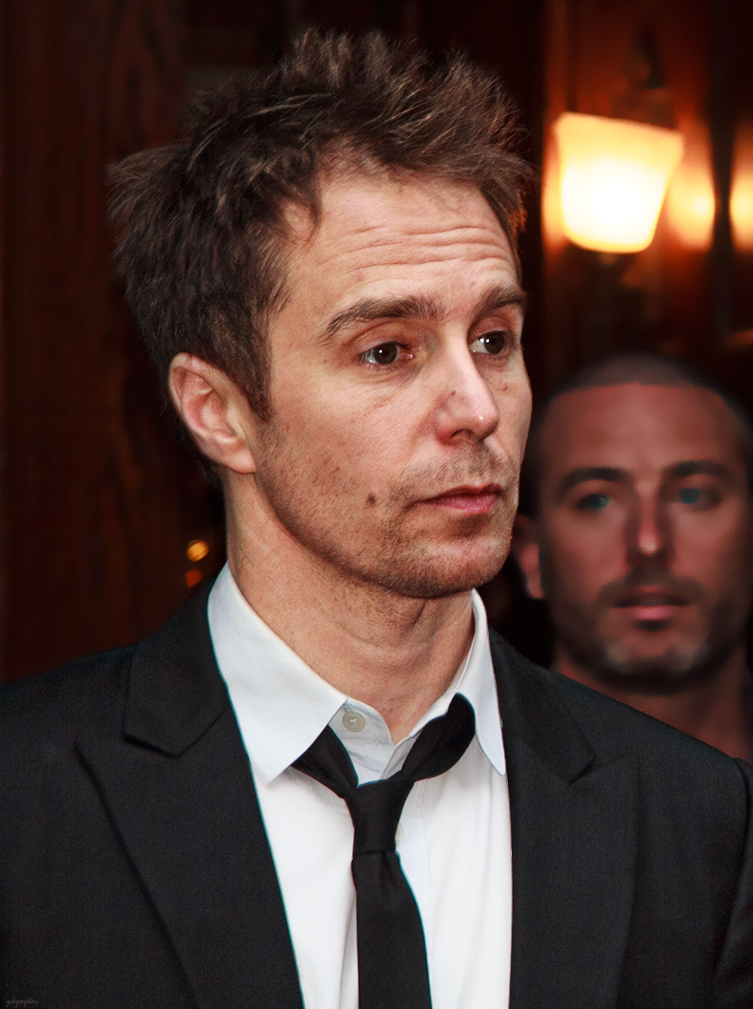
Sam Rockwell, Best Supporting Actor winner

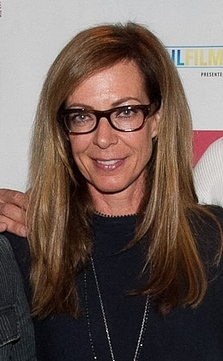
Allison Janney, Best Supporting Actress winner

Winners are listed at the top of each list in bold, while the runner-ups for each category are listed under them.

Best Film	Best Director
**Dunkirk**: Runner-up: Lady Bird; Call Me by Your Name; Get Out; The Shape of Water; Three Billboards Outside Ebbing, Missouri	**Christopher Nolan – Dunkirk**: Runner-up: Greta Gerwig – Lady Bird; Guillermo del Toro – The Shape of Water; Martin McDonagh – Three Billboards Outside Ebbing, Missouri; Jordan Peele – Get Out
Best Actor	Best Actress
**Timothée Chalamet – Call Me by Your Name as Elio Perlman**: Runner-up: Gary Oldman – Darkest Hour as Winston Churchill; James Franco – The Disaster Artist as Tommy Wiseau; Daniel Kaluuya – Get Out as Chris Washington; Robert Pattinson – Good Time as Constantine "Connie" Nikas	**Margot Robbie – I, Tonya as Tonya Harding**: Runner-up: Frances McDormand – Three Billboards Outside Ebbing, Missouri as Mildred Hayes; Sally Hawkins – The Shape of Water as Elisa Esposito; Cynthia Nixon – A Quiet Passion as Emily Dickinson; Saoirse Ronan – Lady Bird as Christine "Lady Bird" McPherson
Best Supporting Actor	Best Supporting Actress
**Sam Rockwell – Three Billboards Outside Ebbing, Missouri as Jason Dixon**: Runner-up: Willem Dafoe – The Florida Project as Bobby Hicks; Armie Hammer – Call Me by Your Name as Oliver; Barry Keoghan – The Killing of a Sacred Deer as Martin Lang; Michael Stuhlbarg – Call Me by Your Name as Mr. Perlman	**Allison Janney – I, Tonya as LaVona Golden**: Runner-up: Laurie Metcalf – Lady Bird as Marion McPherson; Mary J. Blige – Mudbound as Florence Jackson; Hong Chau – Downsizing as Ngoc Lan Tran; Holly Hunter – The Big Sick as Beth Gardner
Best Adapted Screenplay	Best Original Screenplay
**Call Me by Your Name**: Runner-up: The Disaster Artist; The Lost City of Z; Marjorie Prime; Molly's Game; Wonderstruck	**Get Out**: Runner-up: Three Billboards Outside Ebbing, Missouri; The Big Sick; Lady Bird; The Shape of Water
Best Animated Film	Best Documentary
**Coco**: Runner-up: Loving Vincent; The Boss Baby; The Breadwinner; The Lego Batman Movie	**Jane**: Runner-up: Ex Libris: The New York Public Library; Dawson City: Frozen Time; Faces Places; Joan Didion: The Center Will Not Hold; Kedi
Best Foreign Language Film	Best Ensemble
**BPM (Beats per Minute)**: Runner-up: The Square; First They Killed My Father; Loveless; The Ornithologist	**Three Billboards Outside Ebbing, Missouri**: Runner-up: Dunkirk; The Big Sick; Get Out; I, Tonya; Lady Bird; The Shape of Water
Best Art Direction / Production Design	Best Cinematography
**Blade Runner 2049**: Runner-up: Dunkirk; Phantom Thread; The Shape of Water; Wonderstruck	**Blade Runner 2049**: Runner-up: Dunkirk; Personal Shopper; The Post; The Shape of Water; Wonderstruck
Best Score	Best Visual Effects
**Blade Runner 2049**: Runner-up: Dunkirk; Phantom Thread; The Shape of Water; Three Billboards Outside Ebbing, Missouri	**Blade Runner 2049**: Runner-up: War for the Planet of the Apes; Dunkirk; Guardians of the Galaxy Vol. 2; The Shape of Water; Star Wars: The Last Jedi
Best First Film	Pauline Kael Breakout Award
**Get Out**: Runner-up: God's Own Country; Ingrid Goes West; Molly's Game	**Timothée Chalamet**: Runner-up: Jordan Peele; Greta Gerwig; Barry Keoghan; Millicent Simmonds
Golden Orange Award
**The cast and crew of The Florida Project**
