= Hong Chau =

American actress (born 1979)

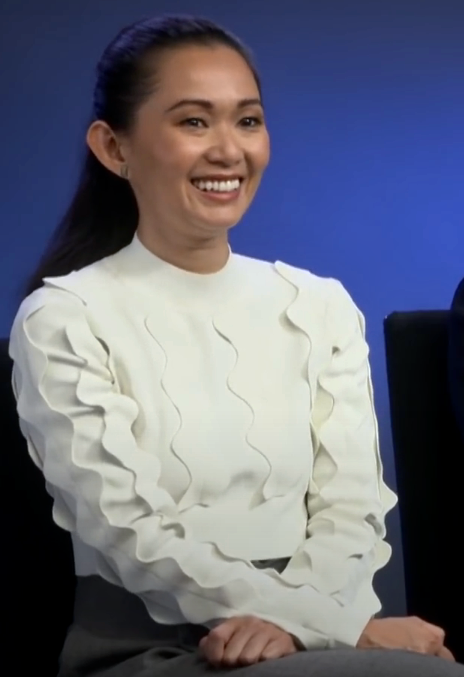
- Chau in 2018
- Born: Hồng Châu; June 25, 1979 (age 47); Thailand (Note: USA Today wrote, "Chau's own parents... fled Vietnam by boat in 1979 when her mom was six months pregnant with her. She was born in a Thai refugee camp, before they were taken in by a sponsor family in New Orleans.")
- Citizenship: American
- Education: Boston University (BA)
- Occupation: Actress
- Years active: 2006–present
- Children: 1

Hong Chau (born June 25, 1979) is an American actress. She is most known for her performance in the 2022 film The Whale, for which she was nominated for an Academy Award for Best Supporting Actress and other supporting actress awards. Her breakthrough role was in the 2017 film Downsizing, for which she was nominated for several supporting-actress awards. Variety wrote in 2022 that Chau had "been prolific in recent years" and that she had "an acclaimed turn" in the TV series Watchmen (2019) and Homecoming (2018–2020).

She appeared in the TV series Treme (2010–2013) and the film Inherent Vice (2014). In 2018, she had guest-star roles in several TV series. In 2019, she played a supporting role in the limited series Watchmen, and had leading roles in the films American Woman and Driveways. She moved from a supporting role in the first season of Homecoming to a starring role in 2020. In 2022, she had supporting roles in the films Showing Up, The Menu, and The Whale. In 2023, she had a main role in the TV series The Night Agent.

Chau was born to Vietnamese parents who lived in a refugee camp in Thailand after fleeing Vietnam in the late 1970s. A Vietnamese Catholic church in New Orleans, Louisiana, sponsored Chau and her family to move to the United States. She grew up in New Orleans and majored in film studies at Boston University's College of Communication.

== Early life and education ==
Chau was born on June 25, 1979, in a refugee camp in Thailand. Before her birth, her parents and two brothers lived in Vietnam. In 1979, the family fled the country as part of the Vietnamese boat people; her mother was six months pregnant with her at the time. During their escape, Chau's father was shot and nearly bled to death.

A Vietnamese Catholic church in New Orleans, Louisiana, arranged for a local family to sponsor them, and they resettled in the United States. Chau grew up speaking Vietnamese as her first language and learned English in school. Her family lived in government housing and relied on subsidized lunch programs.

Chau was raised in New Orleans East and attended Eleanor McMain Secondary School and Benjamin Franklin High School, both in New Orleans. She graduated from the Louisiana School for Math, Science, and the Arts in Natchitoches, Louisiana. Her parents worked as dishwashers and later ran a convenience store, prioritizing their children's college education. Chau has said her parents, who speak English with heavy Vietnamese accents, were often shunned as Asian migrants. She reflected, "My whole life, I've always felt like I was the more acceptable of my parents, and they were always the people who had to stay in the background, or hide in the broom closet."

With the help of Pell Grants, Chau attended Boston University in Massachusetts, where she initially studied creative writing. She switched her major to film studies at her parents' urging to pursue a more practical field. She explored acting to challenge her introversion, appearing in other students' short films and receiving encouragement to pursue it professionally. She graduated from the Boston University College of Communication in 2001. After college, Chau worked for PBS and anticipated a career in documentaries. She began taking public speaking classes to overcome her introversion, which led to improv classes. After a sitcom director encouraged her to move to Los Angeles, she relocated and began seeking acting opportunities.

== Career ==
=== 2006–2017: Early work and breakthrough with Downsizing ===
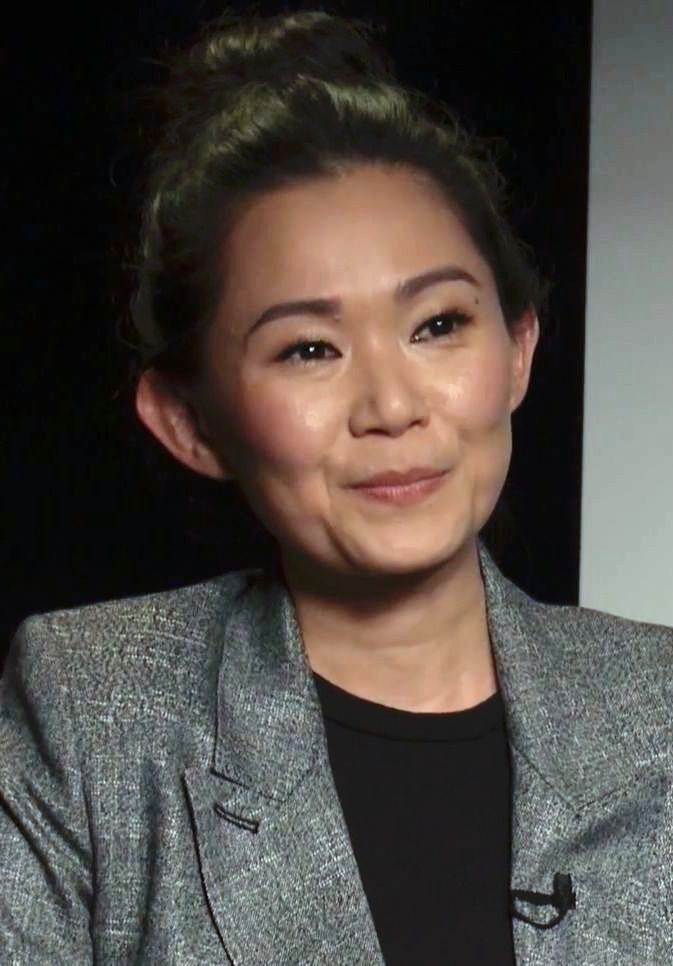
Chau in 2016

Chau began acting in film and television in 2006. In the early 2010s, she had guest roles on the CBS TV series NCIS and How I Met Your Mother. One of her first major roles was in the TV series Treme (2010–2013), which was set in New Orleans. Her first feature film role was in the 2014 film Inherent Vice. For two years after her role, she was not able to get an audition for another film role. In 2015, she had a key role in the Off-Broadway play John; she credited the experience for strengthening her acting. She also had a supporting role in the 2017 premiere season of the TV series Big Little Lies. She subsequently appeared in a supporting role in the 2017 film Downsizing, for which her performance was described as a standout by several reviews. She was nominated for several awards for best supporting actress (see accolades). Some criticized her character Ngoc Lan Tran as stereotypical because Chau spoke in broken English, but Chau said that she found her character "so multifaceted and complex and well-written".

=== 2018–2020: Leading roles ===
Following Downsizing, in 2018, Hong Chau was one of 928 new members invited by the Academy of Motion Picture Arts and Sciences. She appeared in guest roles in several TV series, including BoJack Horseman and Forever. She had a supporting role as a corporate secretary in the first season of the Amazon Prime Video series Homecoming. The Ringer's Alison Herman said another actor would have sought to accumulate more recurring roles on TV series. Herman said, "In the Peak TV Era, Chau opted for something much savvier: taking some choice guest parts in a few critically acclaimed TV shows ... Chau benefits from these shows' prestige; the shows benefit from her talents." In 2019, The Hollywood Reporter's Rebecca Sun said since Downsizing, "Chau has appeared in a series of critically acclaimed projects."

Chau had her first leading roles in the films Driveways and American Woman, both released at film festivals in 2019. For Driveways, Chau was familiar with director Andrew Ahn's previous film Spa Night, recognized his name when he contacted her with an offer for the role, and readily accepted the offer. Also in 2019, Chau appeared in the HBO limited series Watchmen as the trillionaire Lady Trieu, whose performance The Hollywood Reporter's TV critic Tim Goodman said was one of the series' "exceptional, memorable performances". Following the 2020 video-on-demand release of Driveways, Rolling Stone's Maria Fontoura wrote that Chau has a "cool tenacity" in her roles. Fontoura said, "Whether she's playing a mysterious mogul, a secretive secretary, or a grieving single mother, the actress is steely, whip-smart, and deceptively powerful."

In May 2020, Chau had a larger role in Homecoming's second season, in which she moves from secretary to a person in charge in the series's featured corporation. Entertainment Tonight's Stacy Lambe said Chau "has become something of a scene stealer over the years". Lambe said, "What's notable about most of her projects is that they feature a diverse cast of actors of color who get to shine in unexpected ways," highlighting Treme, Watchmen, and Homecoming. While Chau had filmed a small part as Opal Koboi in the 2020 film Artemis Fowl, her appearance was ultimately cut. Her character's voice was used, but Chau was not officially credited. Her deleted scene became available on Disney+.

=== 2021–present: Oscar nomination for The Whale ===
Chau spent most of 2020 in a lockdown for the COVID-19 pandemic in the United States. She gave birth to a daughter in November. In 2021, she acted in four films: The Whale, Showing Up, The Menu, and Asteroid City. For The Whale, she was invited by its director Darren Aronofsky to audition for a role. Chau was initially reluctant to audition, preferring to stay home with her newborn and doubting she would get the role as it was originally played by a white actress. For The Menu, Chau was a fan of the TV series Succession and wanted to work with director Mark Mylod, who had directed over a dozen episodes in the series. She also wanted to work with actor Ralph Fiennes. For Asteroid City, its director Wes Anderson saw Chau in a play about five years earlier and sought an opportunity to cast her.

Showing Up premiered in May 2022 at the 2022 Cannes Film Festival, and in September, The Whale premiered at the 79th Venice International Film Festival, and The Menu premiered at the 2022 Toronto International Film Festival. Both The Whale and The Menu had commercial releases in theaters later in the year. Chau said she gives directors "a wide range of line readings and reactions each time they call 'action'". Variety wrote, "It's resulted in a string of performances of remarkable versatility, star turns." For her role in The Whale, Chau was nominated for the Academy Award for Best Supporting Actress.

Chau appeared as a guest star in an episode of the TV series Poker Face, which premiered in January 2023. Chau also appeared in the TV series The Night Agent, which premiered on March 23, 2023. Chau was familiar with series creator Shawn Ryan's work with the series The Shield and Terriers and accepted the opportunity to work with Ryan and to have a role in a political thriller that would be new genre territory for her.

Chau had a single scene in Asteroid City, which premiered at the 2023 Cannes Film Festival. She was part of another ensemble cast in Yorgos Lanthimos's absurdist anthology film Kinds of Kindness, which premiered at the 2024 Cannes Film Festival. Lanthimos cast her to play three parts in it after being impressed with her acting range in Showing Up. Chau next appeared in the action thriller film The Instigators (2024), directed by Doug Liman.

== Personal life ==
As of May 2020, she owned a Rottweiler-Australian Shepherd mix. In November of that year, Chau gave birth to a daughter. She lives with her husband, whom she met in Boston and who grew up in New Hampshire.

== Filmography ==
=== Film ===
Chau's film roles
Year	Title	Role	Notes	Ref.
2014	Inherent Vice	Jade		
2017	Downsizing	Ngoc Lan Tran		
2018	Duck Butter	Glow		
2019	Driveways	Kathy		
2019	American Woman	Jenny Shimada		
2020	Artemis Fowl	Opal Koboi	Uncredited voice role; deleted scene	
2022	Showing Up	Jo Tran		
2022	The Whale	Liz		
2022	The Menu	Elsa		
2023	Asteroid City	Polly		
2024	Kinds of Kindness	Sarah, Sharon and Aka	Triple role	
2024	The Instigators	Dr. Donna Rivera		
2026	Wuthering Heights	Nelly Dean		
2026	The Sheep Detectives	Beth Pennock		

=== Television ===
Chau's TV roles
Year(s)	Title	Role	Notes	Ref.
2006	Finding My America	Minh	Episode: "The Road Trip Begins"	
2008	The Sarah Silverman Program	Asian Masseuse	Episode: "Patriot Tact"	
2010	How I Met Your Mother	Cook Pu	Episode: "Perfect Week"	
2010	Trenches	Spc. Wing	Main role (10 episodes)	
2010	NCIS	F.B.I. Lab Tech Molly Choi	Episode: "Jurisdiction"	
2010	My Boys	Audrey	Episode: "Puss 'N' Glutes"	
2010	$h*! My Dad Says	DJ	Episode: "Code Ed"	
2011–2013	Treme	Linh	13 episodes	
2012	CSI: Crime Scene Investigation	Julie Blanch	Episode: "Ms. Willows Regrets"	
2012	Good Luck Charlie	Theresa	Episode: "Welcome Home"	
2014–2015	A to Z	Lora	Main role (13 episodes)	
2017	Big Little Lies	Jackie	6 episodes	
2017	American Dad!	Korean Spy	Voice; episode: "Casino Normale"	
2018	BoJack Horseman	Pickles Aplenty	Voice; 5 episodes (Note: In 2019, Julia Chan replaced Chau in voicing Pickles Aplenty.)	
2018	Forever	Sarah	Episode: "Andre and Sarah"	
2018–2020	Homecoming	Audrey Temple	Main role (11 episodes)	
2019	Watchmen	Lady Trieu	Main role (4 episodes)	
2023	Poker Face	Marge	Episode: "The Night Shift"	
2023	The Night Agent	Diane Farr	Main role (season 1)	

=== Theatre ===
Chau's stage roles
Year	Title	Role	Playwright	Venue	Ref.
2015	John	Jenny	Annie Baker	Signature Theatre, Off-Broadway	

== Awards and nominations ==
Chau had a supporting role in the 2017 film Downsizing and was nominated for several awards, including Golden Globe Award for Best Supporting Actress – Motion Picture and Actor Award for Outstanding Performance by a Female Actor in a Supporting Role. Considered a probable nominee for the Academy Award for Best Supporting Actress at the 90th Academy Awards, (Note: Sources have mentioned Chau as a potential candidate for the 90th Academy Awards.) she was not nominated. (Note: Sources have noted that Chau's absence from the Oscar nominations was one of the biggest snubs and surprises of the 90th Academy Awards.) USA Today's Andrea Mandell said, "Hong Chau was snubbed ... a nomination many had assumed was a lock given the strength of her performance as a Vietnamese refugee."

Chau also had a supporting role in the 2022 film The Whale and was nominated for the Academy Award for Best Supporting Actress for the first time. She was also nominated for other supporting-actress awards including the Gotham Independent Film Award for Outstanding Supporting Performance, the BAFTA Award for Best Actress in a Supporting Role, and the Actor Award for Outstanding Performance by a Female Actor in a Supporting Role.

Awards and nominations received by Hong Chau
Organizations (Note: Awards, festivals, honors and other miscellaneous organizations are listed in alphabetical order.)	Year (Note: Year in which award ceremony was held.)	Category	Work	Result	Ref.
Academy Awards	2023	Best Supporting Actress	The Whale	Nominated	
Actor Awards	2018	Outstanding Performance by a Female Actor in a Supporting Role	Downsizing	Nominated	
Actor Awards	2023	Outstanding Performance by a Female Actor in a Supporting Role	The Whale	Nominated	
Alliance of Women Film Journalists	2023	Best Actress in a Supporting Role	The Whale	Nominated	
Astra Creative Arts TV Awards	2024	Best Guest Actress in a Comedy Series	Poker Face	Nominated	
Astra Film Awards	2023	Best Supporting Actress	The Whale	Nominated	
British Academy Film Awards	2023	Best Actress in a Supporting Role	The Whale	Nominated	
Chicago Film Critics Association	2022	Best Supporting Actress	The Whale	Nominated	
Chlotrudis Awards	2024	Best Performance in a Supporting Role	Showing Up	Nominated	
Cinequest Film Festival	2020	Maverick Spirit Award (Note: Cinequest Film Festival describes the award, "The Maverick Award, recognizes bold, visionary and creative forces—exemplary in the worlds of Silicon Valley innovation and the creative arts. Its Maverick Spirit Awards recognizes artists...")	—	Honored	
Critics' Choice Movie Awards	2018	Best Supporting Actress	Downsizing	Nominated	
Dallas–Fort Worth Film Critics Association	2022	Best Supporting Actress	The Whale	Runner-up	
Dorian Awards	2023	Supporting Film Performance of the Year	The Whale	Nominated	
Downtown Los Angeles Film Festival	2019	Best Actress	American Woman	Won	
Florida Film Critics Circle	2017	Best Supporting Actress	Downsizing	Nominated	
Gold List	2023	Best Performance in a Supporting Role	The Whale	Nominated	
Golden Globe Awards	2018	Best Supporting Actress – Motion Picture	Downsizing	Nominated	
Gotham Independent Film Awards	2022	Outstanding Supporting Performance	The Whale	Nominated	
Independent Spirit Awards	2015	Robert Altman Award (Note: The Independent Spirit Robert Altman Award is presented to the ensemble cast, director, and casting director of a film.)	Inherent Vice	Won	
Independent Spirit Awards	2020	Best Female Lead	Driveways	Nominated	
Independent Spirit Awards	2024	Robert Altman Award	Showing Up	Won	
International Cinephile Society	2023	Best Supporting Actress	Showing Up	Nominated	
Las Vegas Film Critics Society	2022	Best Supporting Actress	The Whale	Nominated	
London Film Critics' Circle	2023	Supporting Actress of the Year	The Whale	Nominated	
New York Film Critics Online	2022	Best Supporting Actress	The Whale	Won	
Santa Barbara International Film Festival	2017	Virtuosos Award (Note: Per Variety, "The Virtuosos Award is given annually to artists who have distinguished themselves through breakthrough performances in film.")	Downsizing	Honored	
St. Louis Film Critics Association	2017	Best Supporting Actress	Downsizing	Nominated	

== See also ==
- Asian Americans in arts and entertainment
- List of Academy Award winners and nominees of Asian descent
