= Downsizing (film) =

2017 film directed by Alexander Payne

- Theatrical release poster
- Directed by: Alexander Payne
- Written by: Alexander Payne; Jim Taylor
- Produced by: Mark Johnson; Alexander Payne; Jim Taylor
- Starring: Matt Damon; Christoph Waltz; Hong Chau; Kristen Wiig
- Cinematography: Phedon Papamichael
- Edited by: Kevin Tent
- Music by: Rolfe Kent
- Production companies: Ad Hominem Enterprises; Gran Via Productions
- Distributed by: Paramount Pictures
- Release dates: August 30, 2017 (Venice); December 22, 2017 (United States)
- Running time: 135 minutes
- Country: United States
- Language: English
- Budget: $68–76 million
- Box office: $55 million

Downsizing is a 2017 American science fiction comedy-drama film directed by Alexander Payne, written by Payne and Jim Taylor, and starring Matt Damon, Christoph Waltz, Hong Chau, and Kristen Wiig. It tells the story of Paul Safranek, who decides to undergo a recently invented procedure to shrink his body so he can start a new life in a community for small individuals, which he ends up doing alone when his wife backs out at the last minute; his journey takes an unexpected turn after he befriends an impoverished activist. Principal photography for the film began in Ontario, Canada, on April 1, 2016.

The film premiered at the 74th Venice International Film Festival on August 30, 2017, and was theatrically released in the United States by Paramount Pictures on December 22, 2017. It was a box-office bomb, grossing only $55 million against a production budget of $68–76 million, and received mixed reviews from critics. Nevertheless, it was chosen by the National Board of Review as one of the top ten films of 2017, while Chau earned a nomination for Best Supporting Actress at the 75th Golden Globe Awards.

== Plot ==
Searching for a way to address overpopulation and global warming, Norwegian scientist Dr. Jørgen Asbjørnsen develops "downsizing", an irreversible process that shrinks organic material. He becomes part of the first group of human test subjects and is encouraged that the process reduces people to a height of approximately 5 inches (13 cm), drastically decreasing their consumption and waste. When the findings are revealed at a conference five years later, there is a global sensation.

Ten years later, Paul and Audrey Safranek, a financially struggling married couple in Omaha, see Dave and Carol Johnson, who have downsized, at Paul's high school reunion. Rather than the touted environmental benefits, Dave argues the real reason to downsize is that one's money goes much further when one is small. Paul and Audrey decide to undergo the procedure and move to Leisureland, New Mexico, one of the fancier communities for small individuals. In a Leisureland recovery room after the procedure, Paul receives a call from Audrey, who says she backed out at the last minute and, because they are now different sizes, is leaving him.

Because of his reduced size, Paul is forced into solitary occupancy of a sprawling and luxurious mansion, previously selected by the couple using their greatly enhanced capital. Leisureland is presented as an attractive but bland consumerist enclave for the newly rich and downsized, protected by high walls and a dome.

A year later, Paul signs his divorce papers. Unwilling to live in the mansion Audrey chose, he relocates to an apartment and takes a job as a customer service representative at Lands' End. He had let his occupational therapy license lapse, not anticipating the need to work after being shrunk. He has started dating someone, but they break up, and Paul finds himself at a wild party thrown by his shady yet charming neighbor, Dusan.

The next morning, Paul recognizes one of Dusan's house cleaners as Ngoc Lan Tran, a Vietnamese political activist who was jailed and downsized against her will, escaped in a television box, barely survived being shipped to the United States, and was brought to Leisureland a year ago to have her leg amputated. Wanting to assist Ngoc Lan with her prosthetic leg, Paul goes to her apartment in the slums just outside the walls of Leisureland where those who had no money when they downsized or downsized illegally who now work as the service workers of the community live. Paul had not thought about this part of the small economy, and is shocked by conditions in the slum.

At her apartment, Ngoc Lan has Paul try to help her dying friend. When she finally lets him work on her prosthetic leg, he breaks it, so, until she can get a new one, he agrees to work for her cleaning service and also help her gather food from around the city to distribute throughout the slums. Dusan, upon learning what Paul is doing, attempts to release Paul from his obligation by taking him to deliver supplies to the original colony for small people, but Ngoc Lan unexpectedly decides to tag along, as she has a standing invitation to visit Dr. Asbjørnsen, who had heard about her ordeal.

In a Norwegian fjord, Dr. Asbjørnsen and his wife board the boat piloted by Dusan's friend Joris Konrad. Asbjørnsen announces it has just been determined conclusively that, due to the positive feedback of Antarctic methane emissions, (Note: A mistake for Arctic methane emissions.) the human race will soon become extinct. Paul asks if downsizing can save humanity, but Dr. Asbjørnsen says the procedure came too late, as only three percent of the world has so far chosen to downsize. That night, Paul and Ngoc Lan have sex.

At the colony, the travelers discover that, the next day, Dr. Asbjørnsen is enacting a contingency plan: he and the other colonists are going to enter a large underground vault, and their descendants will emerge when the surface environment stabilizes in about eight thousand years. Dusan and Joris are skeptical of the cult-like plan and say the extinction will not happen for hundreds of years, while Paul is excited to enter the vault and help with this effort to ensure the future of mankind. He asks Ngoc Lan to join him, but she refuses, saying the people in need of help will be those left above ground. As the door of the vault is closing, Paul changes his mind and steps outside.

Back in Leisureland, Paul continues to work with Ngoc Lan to serve the people of the slums, deriving contentment from things like bringing dinner to an old man.

== Cast ==
- Matt Damon as Paul Safranek, an occupational therapist who signs up for the "downsizing" program
- Christoph Waltz as Dusan Mirkovic, an aging Serbian playboy and profiteer
- Hong Chau as Ngoc Lan Tran, a Vietnamese activist who was shrunk by her government against her will and befriends Paul after she winds up in Leisureland
- Kristen Wiig as Audrey Safranek, Paul's wife, who divorces him after she decides not to complete the "downsizing" procedure
- Rolf Lassgård as Dr. Jørgen Asbjørnsen, the inventor of the "downsizing" procedure
- Ingjerd Egeberg as Anne-Helene Asbjørnsen, Jørgen's wife
- Udo Kier as Joris Konrad, Dusan's friend
- Søren Pilmark as Dr. Andreas Jacobsen, the lead scientist at the Edvardsen Institute
- Jason Sudeikis as Dave Johnson, Paul's childhood friend, who encourages Paul to "downsize"
- Maribeth Monroe as Carol Johnson, Dave's wife
- Margareta Pettersson as Solveig Edvardsen, an eccentric elder at the original colony for the small

There are numerous cameos in the film, among them: Joaquim de Almeida as Conference Director Dr. Oswaldo Pereira; James Van Der Beek as an anesthesiologist, a former-classmate of Paul's who he talks to at their high school reunion; Neil Patrick Harris and Laura Dern as Jeff and Laura Lonowski, a small couple who gives a sales presentation for Leisureland; Niecy Nash as a Leisureland salesperson; Margo Martindale as a small woman on a shuttle bus; Donna Lynne Champlin as a Leisureland administrator; Don Lake as Matt, a Leisureland guide; Kerri Kenney-Silver as Kristen, a single mom who Paul dates after his divorce; Jayne Houdyshell as Paul's ailing mother; and Pepe Serna as Señor Cárdenas, a member of the downsized community.

== Production ==
=== Development and casting ===
During the seven-year hiatus between the releases of their collaborations Sideways (2004) and The Descendants (2011), Alexander Payne and Jim Taylor spent two and a half years working on the script for Downsizing, which was going to be Payne's next film after Sideways until it was superseded by The Descendants and then Nebraska (2013). On November 5, 2014, it was officially announced that Downsizing would be Payne's follow-up to Nebraska.

Payne, Taylor, and Mark Johnson produced the film, whose script was co-written by Payne and Taylor. On January 8, 2015, it was announced that Annapurna Pictures would finance and produce the film; Ad Hominem Enterprises, Payne and Taylor's production company, was also involved with the production. 20th Century Fox was originally going to distribute the film, but it was revealed on October 2, 2015, that Paramount Pictures had acquired distribution rights.

Reese Witherspoon was attached to the project in 2009, at which point Paul Giamatti and Sacha Baron Cohen were also set to star. On November 5, 2014, Matt Damon was officially cast in the film, taking over Giamatti's role. On January 7, 2015, it was confirmed that Witherspoon was still participating in the project, which would have been her first collaboration with Payne since Election (1999). The next day, it was announced that Alec Baldwin, Neil Patrick Harris, and Jason Sudeikis had joined the cast, though Baldwin later dropped out. On March 10, 2016, Christoph Waltz and Hong Chau joined the film, and on March 29, it was revealed that Kristen Wiig had replaced Witherspoon as Damon's character's wife. In August 2016, it was announced that Margo Martindale had been cast in a minor role.

=== Filming ===
Principal photography for the film began on April 1, 2016, in Mississauga and Toronto, Ontario, Canada, at York University’s Vari Hall, University of Toronto Mississauga and the Aga Khan Museum. Filming later took place in Markham, Omaha, Los Angeles, and Trollfjorden in Norway.

=== Music ===
Rolfe Kent composed the score for the film.

== Release ==
Downsizing premiered at the 74th Venice Film Festival on August 30, 2017, and later screened at the 2017 Toronto International Film Festival. It was theatrically released in the United States on December 22, 2017, by Paramount Pictures.

=== Home media ===
The film was released on Digital HD on March 6, 2018, and on Ultra HD Blu-ray, Blu-ray, and DVD on March 20.

== Reception ==
=== Box office ===
In the United States and Canada, Downsizing was released alongside Father Figures and Pitch Perfect 3, as well as the wide expansions of The Shape of Water and Darkest Hour, and was projected to gross $10–12 million from 2,668 theaters over its four-day opening weekend. It made $2.1 million on its first day (including $425,000 from Thursday night previews) and grossed $4.95 million over its three-day opening weekend, finishing 7th at the box office. This marked the third recent domestic financial failure for Paramount Pictures, following Mother! and Suburbicon, the latter of which also starred Matt Damon. The following weekend, the film dropped 5% to $4.7 million, finishing 9th.

The film grossed $24.4 million in the United States and Canada, and $30.6 million in other territories, for a total of $55 million, against a production budget of around $68 million.

=== Critical response ===
On review aggregator website Rotten Tomatoes, the film has an approval rating of 47% based on 301 reviews, with an average rating of 5.70/10; the website's critical consensus reads: "Downsizing assembles a talented cast in pursuit of some truly interesting ideas – which may be enough for some audiences to forgive the final product's frustrating shortcomings." On Metacritic, the film has a weighted average score of 63 out of 100, based on 48 critics, indicating "generally favorable" reviews. Audiences polled by CinemaScore gave the film an average grade of "C" on an A+ to F scale.

Todd McCarthy of The Hollywood Reporter, who eventually named the film his best of 2017, praised it as "big and beautiful", highlighting the direction and the lead performances, and saying "this is a deeply humane film that, like the best Hollywood classics, feels both entirely of its moment and timeless. It was a risky roll of the dice, but one that hits the creative jackpot." Xan Brooks of The Guardian gave Downsizing five out of five stars, calling the film "Alexander Payne's miniature masterpiece". Writing for Rolling Stone, Peter Travers gave the film 3.5 out of 4 stars, saying that "with startling performances and special effects, director Alexander Payne's dystopian sci-fi satire brims over with the pleasures of the unexpected."

Conversely, David Sims of The Atlantic gave the film a negative review, writing: "If Payne had landed the mix of genres, Downsizing could have been a masterpiece. Spoiler (small print not required): He does not." Keith Uhlich of Slant Magazine gave the film 1.5 out of 4 stars and said: "Payne [...] appears to think he's making some kind of grand statement. So you just sit back and marvel at how his reach continually exceeds his grasp." Richard Brody of The New Yorker described Downsizing as "three movies in one – a passable one, a terrific one, and a terrible one. They're unified in the realization of the movie's big idea, but the movie's straining after a big idea is its overarching weakness."

=== Accolades ===
| Award | Date of ceremony | Category | Nominee(s) | Result | Ref. |
|---|---|---|---|---|---|
| Art Directors Guild Awards | January 27, 2018 | Excellence in Production Design for a Contemporary Film | Stefania Cella | Nominated | |
| Columbus Film Critics Association | January 4, 2018 | Best Supporting Actress | Hong Chau | Nominated | |
| Critics' Choice Movie Awards | January 11, 2018 | Best Supporting Actress | Hong Chau | Nominated | |
| Florida Film Critics Circle | December 23, 2017 | Best Supporting Actress | Hong Chau | Nominated | |
| Golden Globe Awards | January 7, 2018 | Best Supporting Actress – Motion Picture | Hong Chau | Nominated | |
| Golden Trailer Awards | May 31, 2018 | Best International Poster | Paramount Pictures & Ignition Creative | Nominated | |
| International Film Music Critics Association | February 22, 2018 | Best Original Score For A Comedy Film | Rolfe Kent | Nominated | |
| National Board of Review | January 4, 2018 | Top Ten Films | Downsizing | Won | |
| Online Film & Television Association | 2017 | Best Supporting Actress | Hong Chau | Nominated | |
| Santa Barbara International Film Festival | January 31, 2018 | Virtuoso Award | Hong Chau | Won | |
| Satellite Awards | February 10, 2018 | Best Art Direction and Production Design | Downsizing | Nominated | |
| Saturn Awards | June 27, 2018 | Best Fantasy Film | Downsizing | Nominated | |
| Screen Actors Guild Awards | January 21, 2018 | Outstanding Performance by a Female Actor in a Supporting Role | Hong Chau | Nominated | |
| St. Louis Film Critics Association | December 10, 2017 | Best Supporting Actress | Hong Chau | Nominated | |
| Venice Film Festival | September 9, 2017 | Golden Lion | Downsizing | Nominated | |
| Visual Effects Society | February 13, 2018 | Outstanding Supporting Visual Effects in a Photoreal Feature | Lindy de Quattro, Susan MacLeod, Stéphane Nazé and James E. Price | Nominated | |

== See also ==
- List of films featuring miniature people
