= 24th Screen Actors Guild Awards =

- Awarded for: Outstanding motion picture and primetime television performances
- Date: January 21, 2018
- Location: Shrine Auditorium, Los Angeles, California
- Country: United States
- Presented by: SAG-AFTRA
- Hosted by: Kristen Bell
- Website: www.sagawards.org

Television/radio coverage
- Network: TNT and TBS simultaneous broadcast

The 24th Annual Screen Actors Guild Awards, honoring the best achievements in film and television performances for the year 2017, were presented on January 21, 2018, at the Shrine Auditorium in Los Angeles, California. The ceremony was broadcast on both TNT and TBS 8:00 p.m. EST / 5:00 p.m. PST. On December 4, 2017, it was announced that the ceremony would have its first ever host in its twenty-four year history, with actress Kristen Bell presiding over the award show. The nominees were announced on December 13, 2017.

Morgan Freeman was announced as the 2017 SAG Life Achievement Award recipient on August 22, 2017.

== Winners and nominees ==
Note: Winners are listed first and highlighted in boldface.

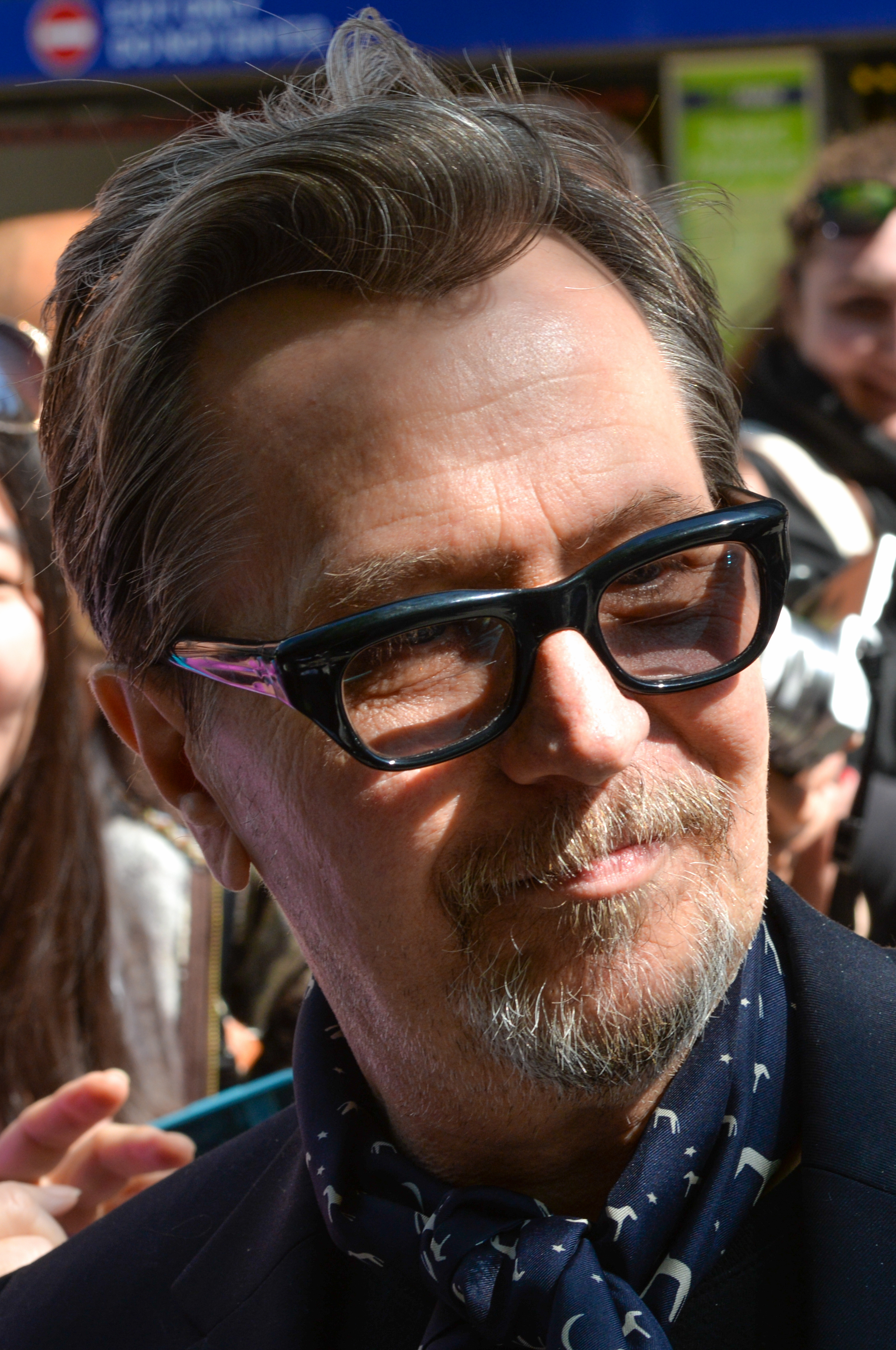
Gary Oldman, Outstanding Performance by a Male Actor in a Leading Role winner

Frances McDormand, Outstanding Performance by a Female Actor in a Leading Role winner

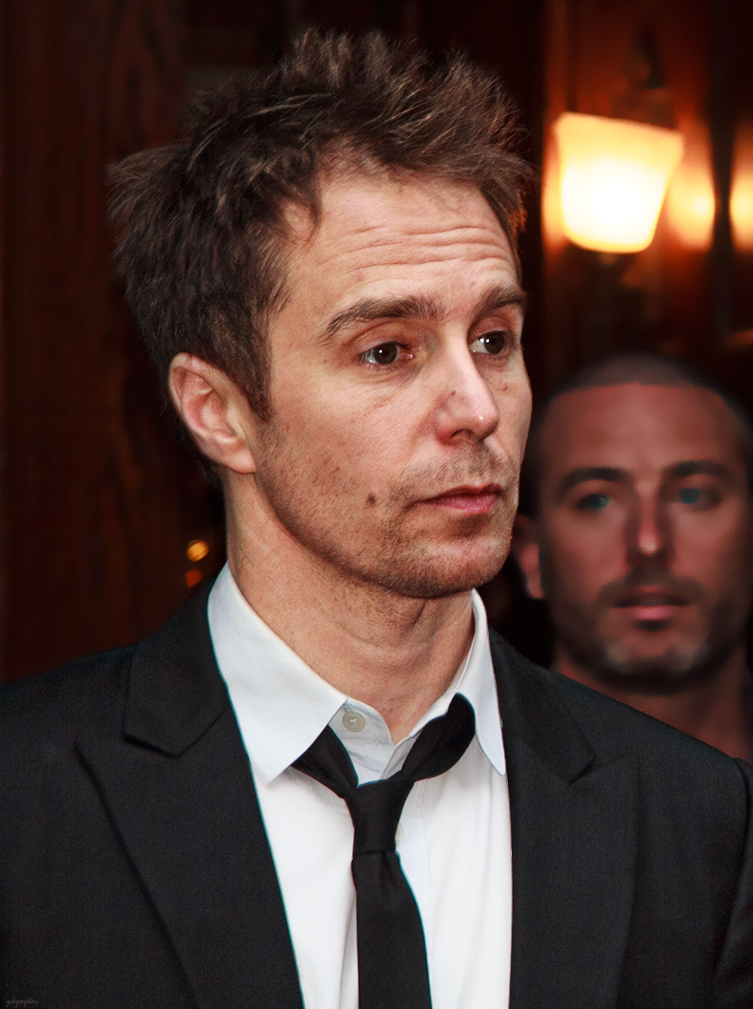
Sam Rockwell, Outstanding Performance by a Male Actor in a Supporting Role winner

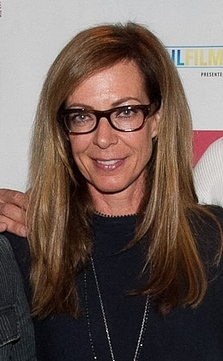
Allison Janney, Outstanding Performance by a Female Actor in a Supporting Role winner

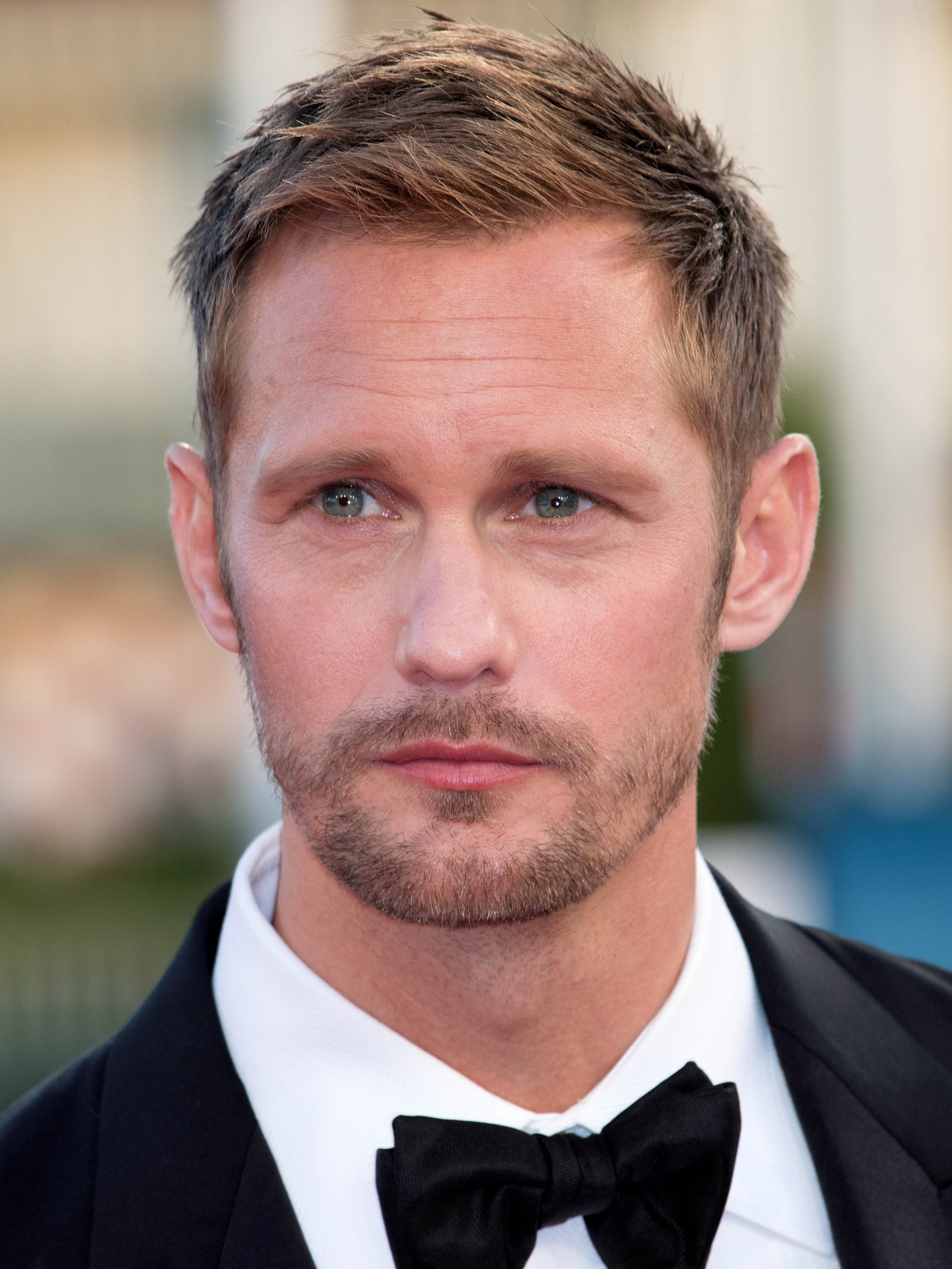
Alexander Skarsgård, Outstanding Performance by a Male Actor in a Miniseries or Television Movie winner

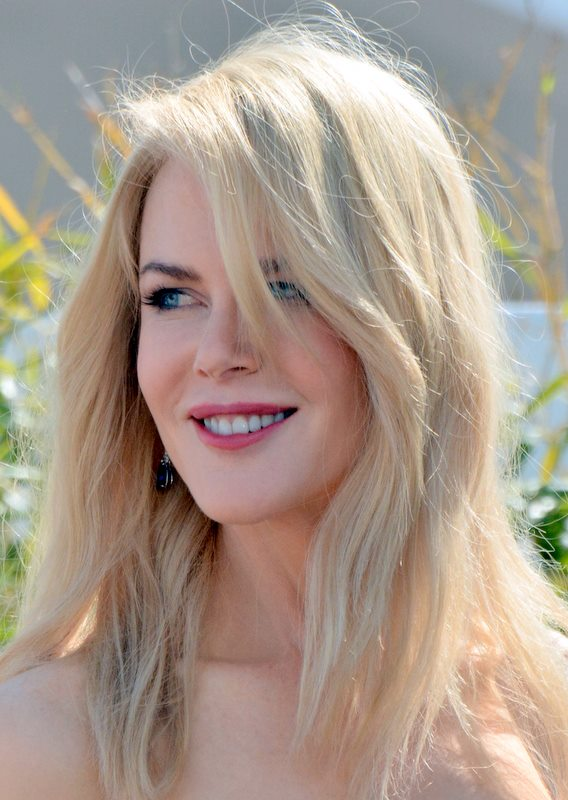
Nicole Kidman, Outstanding Performance by a Female Actor in a Miniseries or Television Movie winner

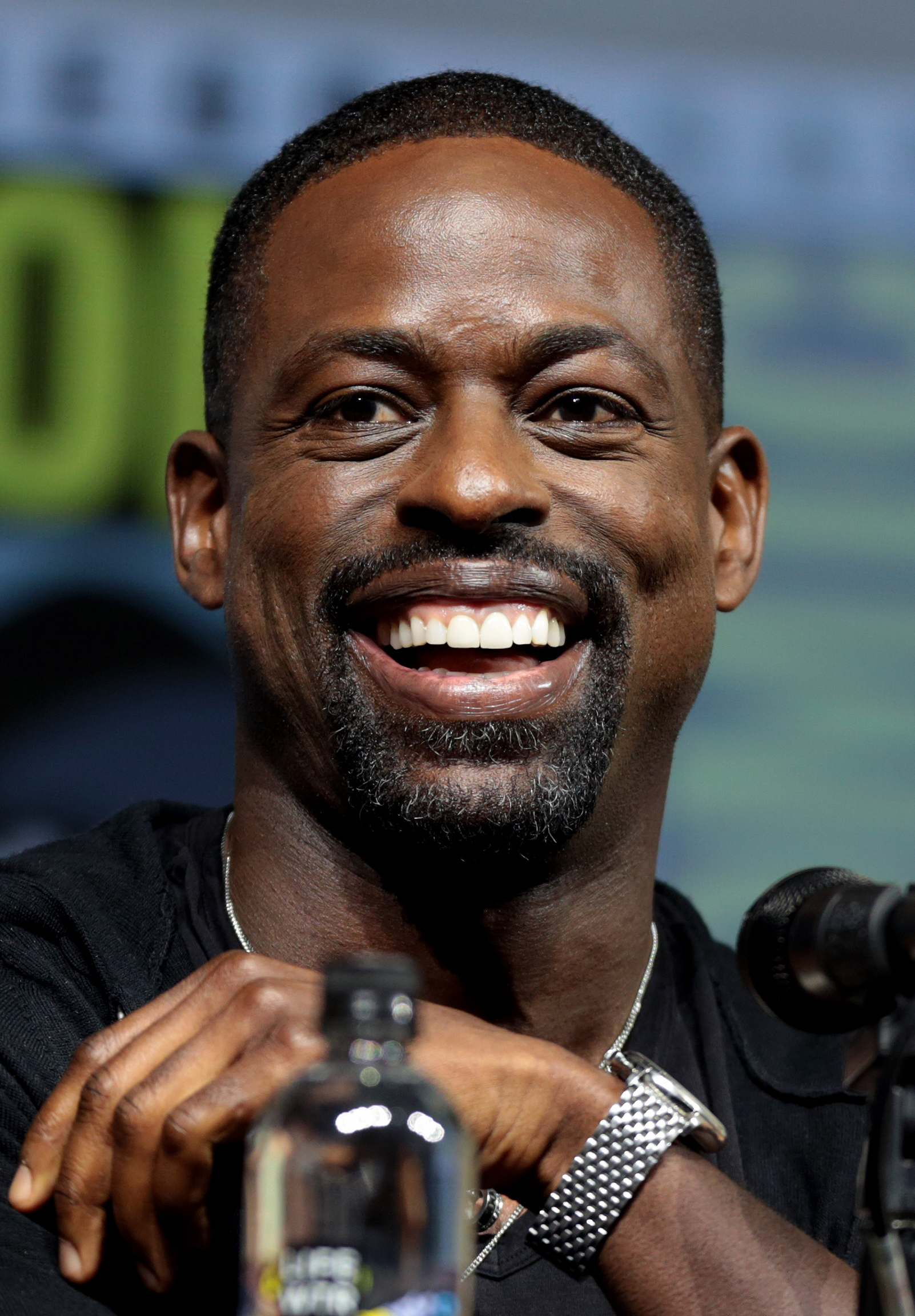
Sterling K. Brown, Outstanding Performance by a Male Actor in a Drama Series winner

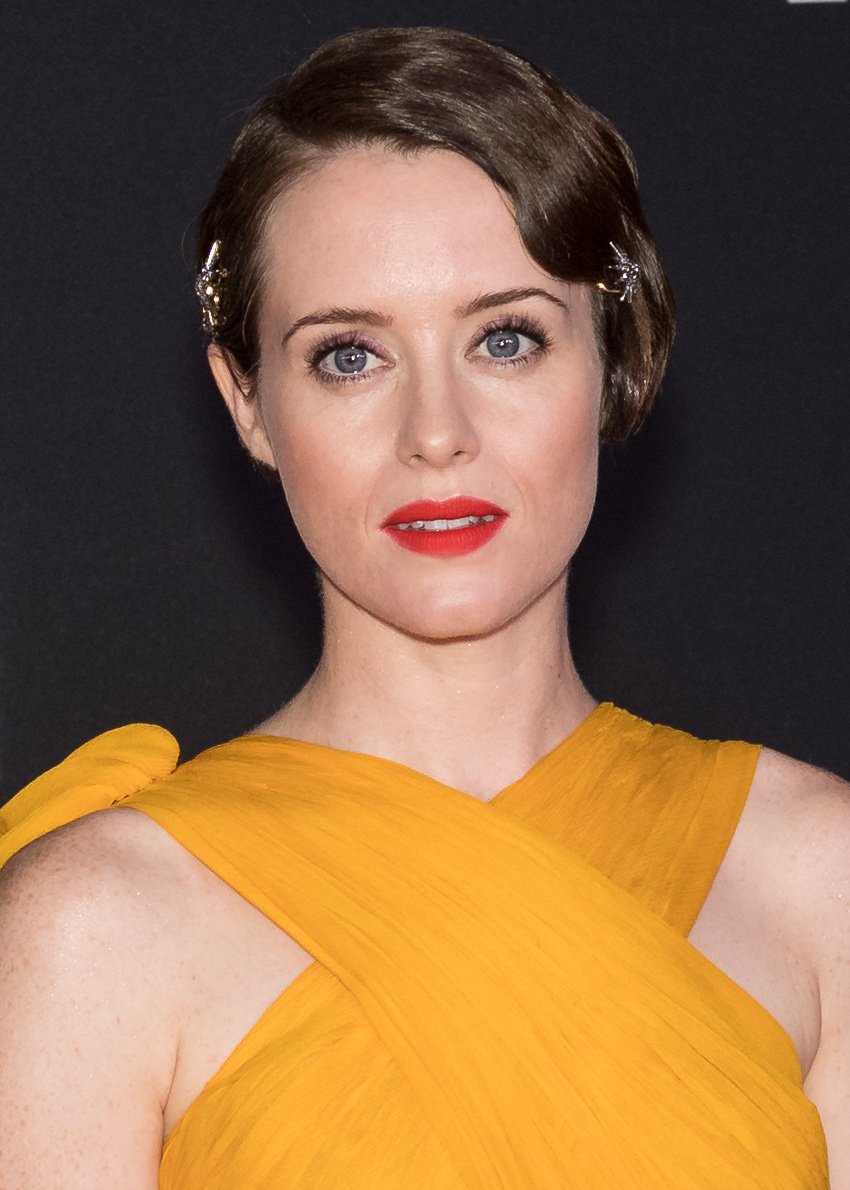
Claire Foy, Outstanding Performance by a Female Actor in a Drama Series winner

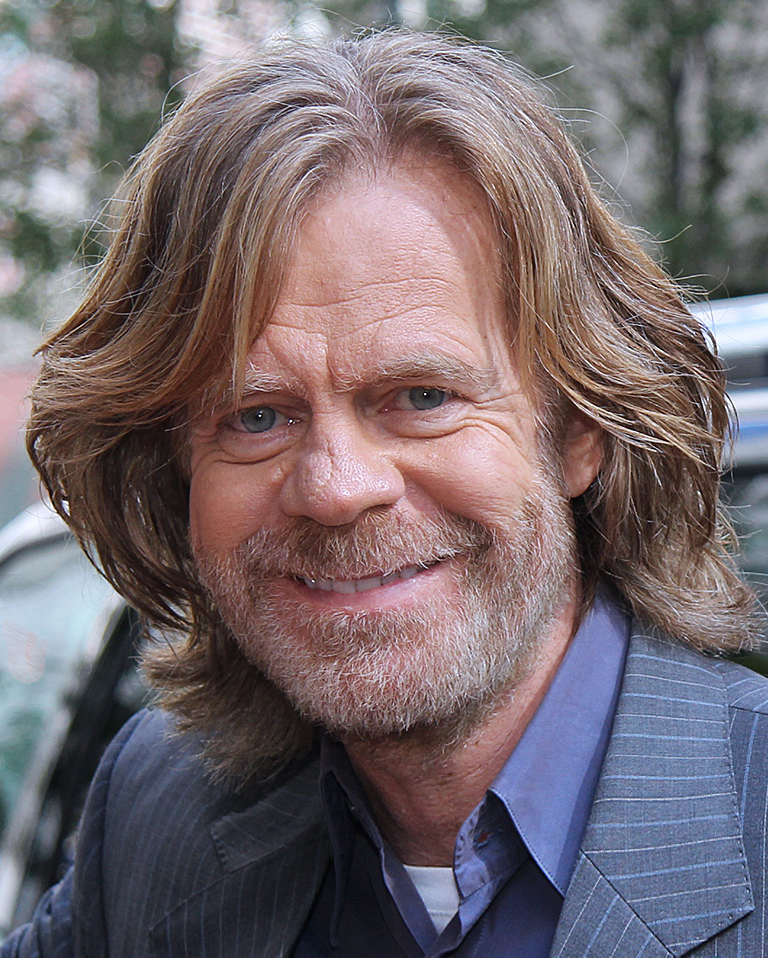
William H. Macy, Outstanding Performance by a Male Actor in a Comedy Series winner

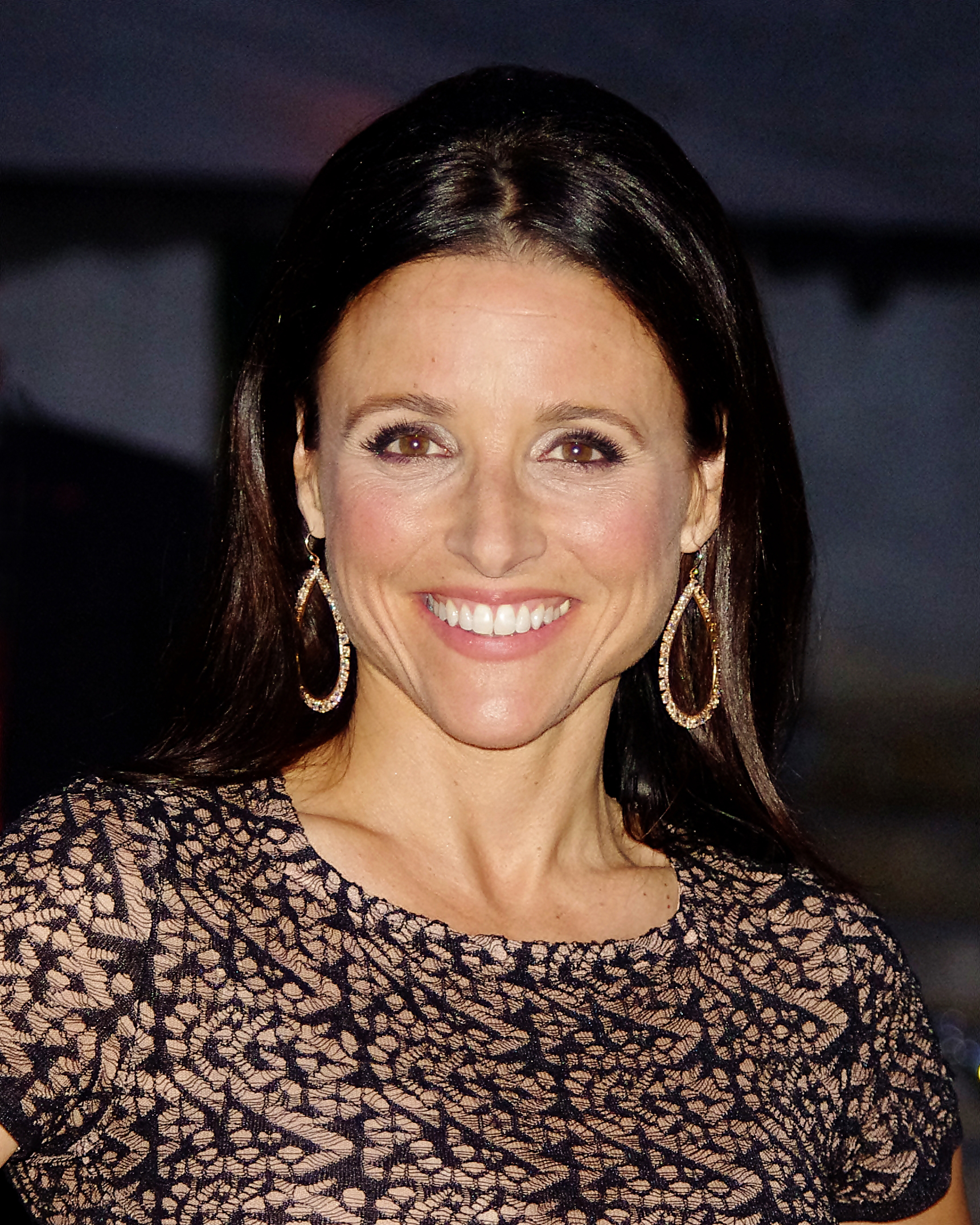
Julia Louis-Dreyfus, Outstanding Performance by a Female Actor in a Comedy Series winner

=== Film ===
Outstanding Performance by a Male Actor in a Leading Role	Outstanding Performance by a Female Actor in a Leading Role
**Gary Oldman – Darkest Hour as Winston Churchill**; Timothée Chalamet – Call Me by Your Name as Elio Perlman; James Franco – The Disaster Artist as Tommy Wiseau; Daniel Kaluuya – Get Out as Chris Washington; Denzel Washington – Roman J. Israel, Esq. as Roman J. Israel	**Frances McDormand – Three Billboards Outside Ebbing, Missouri as Mildred Hayes**; Judi Dench – Victoria & Abdul as Queen Victoria; Sally Hawkins – The Shape of Water as Elisa Esposito; Margot Robbie – I, Tonya as Tonya Harding; Saoirse Ronan – Lady Bird as Christine "Lady Bird" McPherson
Outstanding Performance by a Male Actor in a Supporting Role	Outstanding Performance by a Female Actor in a Supporting Role
**Sam Rockwell – Three Billboards Outside Ebbing, Missouri as Jason Dixon**; Steve Carell – Battle of the Sexes as Bobby Riggs; Willem Dafoe – The Florida Project as Bobby; Woody Harrelson – Three Billboards Outside Ebbing, Missouri as Sheriff William "Bill" Willoughby; Richard Jenkins – The Shape of Water as Giles	**Allison Janney – I, Tonya as LaVona Golden**; Mary J. Blige – Mudbound as Florence Jackson; Hong Chau – Downsizing as Ngoc Lan Tran; Holly Hunter – The Big Sick as Beth Gardner; Laurie Metcalf – Lady Bird as Marion McPherson
Outstanding Performance by a Cast in a Motion Picture
**Three Billboards Outside Ebbing, Missouri – Abbie Cornish, Peter Dinklage, Woody Harrelson, John Hawkes, Lucas Hedges, Željko Ivanek, Caleb Landry Jones, Frances McDormand, Clarke Peters, Sam Rockwell and Samara Weaving**; The Big Sick – Adeel Akhtar, Holly Hunter, Zoe Kazan, Anupam Kher, Kumail Nanjiani, Ray Romano and Zenobia Shroff; Get Out – Caleb Landry Jones, Daniel Kaluuya, Catherine Keener, Stephen Root, Lakeith Stanfield, Bradley Whitford and Allison Williams; Lady Bird – Timothée Chalamet, Beanie Feldstein, Lucas Hedges, Tracy Letts, Stephen McKinley Henderson, Laurie Metcalf, Jordan Rodrigues, Saoirse Ronan, Odeya Rush, Marielle Scott and Lois Smith; Mudbound – Jonathan Banks, Mary J. Blige, Jason Clarke, Garrett Hedlund, Jason Mitchell, Rob Morgan and Carey Mulligan
Outstanding Performance by a Stunt Ensemble in a Motion Picture
**Wonder Woman**; Baby Driver; Dunkirk; Logan; War for the Planet of the Apes

=== Television ===
Outstanding Performance by a Male Actor in a Miniseries or Television Movie	Outstanding Performance by a Female Actor in a Miniseries or Television Movie
**Alexander Skarsgård – Big Little Lies (HBO) as Perry Wright**; Benedict Cumberbatch – Sherlock: The Lying Detective (PBS) as Sherlock Holmes; Jeff Daniels – Godless (Netflix) as Frank Griffin; Robert De Niro – The Wizard of Lies (HBO) as Bernie Madoff; Geoffrey Rush – Genius (National Geographic) as Albert Einstein	**Nicole Kidman – Big Little Lies (HBO) as Celeste Wright**; Laura Dern – Big Little Lies (HBO) as Renata Klein; Jessica Lange – Feud: Bette and Joan (FX) as Joan Crawford; Susan Sarandon – Feud: Bette and Joan (FX) as Bette Davis; Reese Witherspoon – Big Little Lies (HBO) as Madeline MacKenzie
Outstanding Performance by a Male Actor in a Drama Series	Outstanding Performance by a Female Actor in a Drama Series
**Sterling K. Brown – This Is Us (NBC) as Randall Pearson**; Jason Bateman – Ozark (Netflix) as Martin "Marty" Byrde; Peter Dinklage – Game of Thrones (HBO) as Tyrion Lannister; David Harbour – Stranger Things (Netflix) as Jim Hopper; Bob Odenkirk – Better Call Saul (AMC) as Jimmy McGill	**Claire Foy – The Crown (Netflix) as Queen Elizabeth II**; Millie Bobby Brown – Stranger Things (Netflix) as Eleven; Laura Linney – Ozark (Netflix) as Wendy Byrde; Elisabeth Moss – The Handmaid's Tale (Hulu) as June Osborne / Offred; Robin Wright – House of Cards (Netflix) as Claire Underwood
Outstanding Performance by a Male Actor in a Comedy Series	Outstanding Performance by a Female Actor in a Comedy Series
**William H. Macy – Shameless (Showtime) as Frank Gallagher**; Anthony Anderson – Black-ish (ABC) as Andre "Dre" Johnson, Sr.; Aziz Ansari – Master of None (Netflix) as Dev Shah; Larry David – Curb Your Enthusiasm (HBO) as Himself; Sean Hayes – Will & Grace (NBC) as Jack McFarland; Marc Maron – GLOW (Netflix) as Sam Sylvia	**Julia Louis-Dreyfus – Veep (HBO) as Selina Meyer**; Uzo Aduba – Orange Is the New Black (Netflix) as Suzanne "Crazy Eyes" Warren; Alison Brie – GLOW (Netflix) as Ruth "Zoya the Destroya" Wilder; Jane Fonda – Grace and Frankie (Netflix) as Grace Hanson; Lily Tomlin – Grace and Frankie (Netflix) as Frankie Bergstein
Outstanding Performance by an Ensemble in a Drama Series
**This Is Us (NBC) – Eris Baker, Alexandra Breckenridge, Sterling K. Brown, Lonnie Chavis, Mackenzie Hancsicsak, Justin Hartley, Faithe Herman, Ron Cephas Jones, Chrissy Metz, Mandy Moore, Chris Sullivan, Milo Ventimiglia, Susan Kelechi Watson and Hannah Zeile**; The Crown (Netflix) – Claire Foy, Victoria Hamilton, Vanessa Kirby, Anton Lesser and Matt Smith; Game of Thrones (HBO) – Alfie Allen, Jacob Anderson, Pilou Asbæk, Hafþór Júlíus Björnsson, John Bradley West, Jim Broadbent, Gwendoline Christie, Emilia Clarke, Nikolaj Coster-Waldau, Liam Cunningham, Peter Dinklage, Richard Dormer, Nathalie Emmanuel, James Faulkner, Jerome Flynn, Aidan Gillen, Iain Glen, Kit Harington, Lena Headey, Isaac Hempstead Wright, Conleth Hill, Kristofer Hivju, Tom Hopper, Anton Lesser, Rory McCann, Staz Nair, Richard Rycroft, Sophie Turner, Rupert Vansittart and Maisie Williams; The Handmaid's Tale (Hulu) – Madeline Brewer, Amanda Brugel, Ann Dowd, O. T. Fagbenle, Joseph Fiennes, Tattiawna Jones, Max Minghella, Elisabeth Moss, Yvonne Strahovski and Samira Wiley; Stranger Things (Netflix) – Sean Astin, Millie Bobby Brown, Cara Buono, Joe Chrest, Catherine Curtin, Natalia Dyer, David Harbour, Charlie Heaton, Joe Keery, Gaten Matarazzo, Caleb McLaughlin, Dacre Montgomery, Paul Reiser, Winona Ryder, Noah Schnapp, Sadie Sink and Finn Wolfhard
Outstanding Performance by an Ensemble in a Comedy Series
**Veep (HBO) – Dan Bakkedahl, Anna Chlumsky, Gary Cole, Margaret Colin, Kevin Dunn, Clea Duvall, Nelson Franklin, Tony Hale, Julia Louis-Dreyfus, Sam Richardson, Paul Scheer, Reid Scott, Timothy Simons, Sarah Sutherland and Matt Walsh**; Black-ish (ABC) – Anthony Anderson, Miles Brown, Deon Cole, Laurence Fishburne, Jenifer Lewis, Peter Mackenzie, Marsai Martin, Jeff Meacham, Tracee Ellis Ross, Marcus Scribner and Yara Shahidi; Curb Your Enthusiasm (HBO) – Ted Danson, Larry David, Susie Essman, Jeff Garlin, Cheryl Hines and J. B. Smoove; GLOW (Netflix) – Britt Baron, Alison Brie, Kimmy Gatewood, Betty Gilpin, Rebekka Johnson, Chris Lowell, Sunita Mani, Marc Maron, Kate Nash, Sydelle Noel, Marianna Palka, Gayle Rankin, Bashir Salahuddin, Rich Sommer, Kia Stevens, Jackie Tohn, Ellen Wong and Britney Young; Orange Is the New Black (Netflix) – Uzo Aduba, Emily Althaus, Danielle Brooks, Rosal Colon, Jackie Cruz, Francesca Curran, Daniella De Jesús, Lea DeLaria, Nick Dillenburg, Asia Kate Dillon, Beth Dover, Kimiko Glenn, Annie Golden, Laura Gómez, Diane Guerrero, Evan Arthur Hall, Michael J. Harney, Brad William Henke, Mike Houston, Vicky Jeudy, Kelly Karbacz, Julie Lake, Selenis Leyva, Natasha Lyonne, Taryn Manning, Adrienne C. Moore, Miriam Morales, Kate Mulgrew, Emma Myles, John Palladino, Matt Peters, Jessica Pimentel, Dascha Polanco, Laura Prepon, Jolene Purdy, Elizabeth Rodriguez, Nick Sandow, Abigail Savage, Taylor Schilling, Constance Shulman, Dale Soules, Yael Stone, Emily Tarver, Michael Torpey and Lin Tucci
Outstanding Performance by a Stunt Ensemble in a Television Series
**Game of Thrones (HBO)**; GLOW (Netflix); Homeland (Showtime); Stranger Things (Netflix); The Walking Dead (AMC)

=== Screen Actors Guild Life Achievement Award ===
- Morgan Freeman

== Multiple nominations ==
=== Film ===
Nominations	Film
4	Three Billboards Outside Ebbing, Missouri
3	Lady Bird
2	The Big Sick
2	Get Out
2	I, Tonya
2	Mudbound
2	The Shape of Water

=== Television ===
Nominations	Program
4	Big Little Lies
4	GLOW
4	Stranger Things
2	Black-ish
2	The Crown
2	Curb Your Enthusiasm
2	Feud: Bette and Joan
2	Game of Thrones
2	Grace and Frankie
2	The Handmaid's Tale
2	Orange Is the New Black
2	Ozark
2	This Is Us
2	Veep

== Multiple wins ==
=== Film ===
Wins	Film
3	Three Billboards Outside Ebbing, Missouri

=== Television ===
Wins	Program
2	Big Little Lies
2	This Is Us
2	Veep

== In Memoriam ==
Source: The segment honors the following who died in 2017.

- Miguel Ferrer
- John Hurt
- Bill Paxton
- Jeanne Moreau
- Robert Guillaume
- Powers Boothe
- Adam West
- Martin Landau
- John Heard
- Glen Campbell
- Jerry Lewis
- John Hillerman
- Mike Hodge
- Harry Dean Stanton
- Richard Anderson
- Sam Shepard
- Bernie Casey
- Shelley Berman
- Ann Wedgeworth
- Rose Marie
- Glenne Headly
- Jay Thomas
- Charlie Murphy
- Nelsan Ellis
- Dina Merrill
- Joseph Bologna
- Roger Moore
- Loren Janes
- Dick Gregory
- June Foray
- Jerry Van Dyke
- Míriam Colón
- Elena Verdugo
- Paula Dell
- John Bernecker
- Della Reese
- David Cassidy
- Jim Nabors
- Erin Moran
- Don Rickles

== Presenters ==
- Halle Berry
- Dakota Fanning
- Lupita Nyong'o
- Emma Stone
- Kelly Marie Tran
- Mary J. Blige
- Jason Clarke
- Woody Harrelson
- Holly Hunter
- Daniel Kaluuya
- Zoe Kazan
- Frances McDormand
- Laurie Metcalf
- Kumail Nanjiani
- Sam Rockwell
- Ray Romano
- Saoirse Ronan
- Allison Williams
- Rosanna Arquette
- Gabrielle Carteris
- Mandy Moore
- Olivia Munn
- Niecy Nash
- Gina Rodriguez
- Maya Rudolph
- Marisa Tomei
- Connie Britton
- Geena Davis
- Goldie Hawn
- Kate Hudson
- Brie Larson
- Laura Linney
- Leslie Mann
- Megan Mullally
- Sarah Silverman
- Rita Moreno
- Molly Shannon
