= Trapped in Silence =

- Directed by: Michael Tuchner
- Written by: Torey Hayden story "Murphy's Boy"; Vickie Patik (as Pat A. Victor)
- Produced by: Dick Atkins; Jeff Grant executive producer
- Starring: Kiefer Sutherland; Marsha Mason
- Edited by: Eric Albertson
- Release date: May 11, 1986
- Running time: 94 minutes

Trapped in Silence (Note: Trapped In Silence at IMDb) is a 1986 American made-for-television drama film starring Kiefer Sutherland and Marsha Mason, produced by Dick Atkins and Jeff Grant for Reader's Digest Entertainment Inc. It is based on the book Murphy's Boy (Silent Boy) by Torey Hayden.

== Plot ==
The film is about a psychologist (Marsha Mason) who works with a traumatized boy (Kiefer Sutherland) with selective mutism - the patient cannot speak in specific situations or to specific people. Eventually the boy starts to open up to reveal his sordid story.

== Cast ==
- Marsha Mason as Jennifer Hubbell
- Kiefer Sutherland as Kevin Richter
- Ron Silver as Dr. Jeff Tomlinson
- John Mahoney as Dr. Winslow
- Rebecca Schull as Marlys Mengies

== Bibliography ==
- Mitgang, Herbert (May 10, 1986). "TV: 'TRAPPED IN SILENCE' EXPLORES ELECTIVE MUTISM - The New York Times". The New York Times. Arthur Gregg Sulzberger (acceded January 1, 2018). ""Trapped in Silence" manages to tell its depressing story without being too maudlin. [… It] is all too believable as a horrible case history."
- "Trapped In Silence - TV Movie - TV Tango". TV Tango. Michael Allen Vicic (CEO). May 11, 1986. "A psychologist ferrets out the reason why a sixteen year old boy suffers from elective mutism (not talking because of emotional trauma)."
