= The Last (film) =

- Promotional release poster
- Directed by: Jeff Lipsky
- Written by: Jeff Lipsky
- Produced by: Michael Gotanich
- Starring: Reed Birney; A J Cedeño; Jill Durso; Julie Fain Lawrence; Rebecca Schull
- Cinematography: Erlendur Sveinsson
- Edited by: Joana de Bastos Rodrigues
- Production company: Plainview Pictures
- Distributed by: Glass Half Full Media
- Release date: March 29, 2019
- Running time: 123 minutes 124 minutes
- Country: United States
- Language: English

The Last is a 2019 American drama film written and directed by Jeff Lipsky and starring Reed Birney, A J Cedeño, Jill Durso, Julie Fain Lawrence and Rebecca Schull.

== Cast ==
- Rebecca Schull
- Jill Durso
- A J Cedeño
- Reed Birney
- Julie Fain Lawrence

== Release ==
The film was released in theaters on March 29, 2019.

== Reception ==
The film has an 80% rating on Rotten Tomatoes.

Peter Debruge of Variety gave the film a negative review and wrote, "There’s something undeniably fearless in Lipsky’s filmmaking, which makes virtually no concessions to his audience. Still, he seems to have chosen the wrong medium to express himself, and it’s becoming all too clear that he’s not improving with practice."

Frank Scheck of The Hollywood Reporter gave the film a positive review and wrote, "To say that thespians live for opportunities such as this is an understatement, and Schull, whose restrained underplaying only makes the material more powerful, makes the most of it."
