= Twelve Thirty =

Twelve Thirty may refer to:

- "Twelve Thirty (Young Girls Are Coming to the Canyon)", a song by The Mamas & The Papas
- Twelve Thirty (film), a 2010 American drama film
