= Alistair Banks Griffin =

American film director

Alistair Banks Griffin (born May 1, 1978) is an American visual artist and film director. He made his feature film directorial debut with Two Gates of Sleep (2010), which premiered at the 2010 Cannes Film Festival. He also directed the historical drama, The Wolf Hour (2019).

== Filmography ==
| Year | Title | Director | Writer | Producer | Editor | Notes |
|---|---|---|---|---|---|---|
| 2008 | Gauge | Yes | Yes | Yes | Yes | 2008 New York Film Festival (Short film) |
| 2010 | Two Gates of Sleep | Yes | Yes | No | Yes | |
| 2019 | The Wolf Hour | Yes | Yes | No | Yes | |

== Awards and nominations ==
| Year | Award | Category | Work | Result | Ref. |
|---|---|---|---|---|---|
| 2010 | Cannes Film Festival | Caméra d'Or | Two Gates of Sleep | Nominated | |
| 2010 | Cannes Film Festival | C.I.C.A.E. Award | Two Gates of Sleep | Nominated | |
| 2010 | Deauville American Film Festival | Special Grand Prize | Two Gates of Sleep | Nominated | |
| 2010 | BFI London Film Festival | Sutherland Trophy | Two Gates of Sleep | Nominated | |
| 2011 | CPH:PIX | New Talent Grand Prix | Two Gates of Sleep | Won | |
| 2019 | Sundance Film Festival | NEXT Innovator Award | The Wolf Hour | Nominated | |
