= List of Wings episodes =

The following is an episode list for the American television sitcom Wings, which ran on NBC from April 19, 1990, to May 21, 1997, with a total of 172 episodes produced, spanning eight seasons.

== Series overview ==
Season	Episodes	Originally released		Rank	Rating	Ref.
Season	Episodes	First released	Last released	Rank	Rating	Ref.
1	6	April 19, 1990	May 24, 1990	—N/a	—N/a	—N/a
2	22	September 28, 1990	March 28, 1991	42	12.2 (Note: Tied with The NBC Tuesday Night Movie.)	
3	22	September 19, 1991	May 7, 1992	18	15.1	
4	22	September 24, 1992	May 13, 1993	30	13.0	
5	24	September 16, 1993	May 12, 1994	18	14.1 (Note: Tied with NYPD Blue.)	
6	26	September 20, 1994	May 23, 1995	30	11.9	
7	26	September 19, 1995	May 23, 1996	35	11.0	
8	24	September 18, 1996	May 21, 1997	76	7.6 (Note: Tied with Almost Perfect, Chicago Sons, and Temporarily Yours.)	

== Episodes ==
=== Season 1 (1990) ===
The first season consists of only 6 episodes. This is the shortest season of the series.

No.	Title	Directed by	Written by	Original release date	US viewers (millions)
1	"Legacy"	James Burrows	David Angell & Peter Casey & David Lee	April 19, 1990	27.9
In the series premiere, Joe Hackett gets a message that his late father planned a scavenger hunt for an old suitcase of his. However, it also requires Joe to reconnect with his estranged younger brother Brian, who ran off with Joe's ex-fiancée Carol six years earlier.
2	"Around the World in Eighty Years"	Noam Pitlik	Philip LaZebnik	April 26, 1990	25.8
Fay encourages a retired pilot to complete his trip around the world. Brian encourages Helen to wear something more revealing for an upcoming audition.
3	"Return to Nantucket"	Noam Pitlik	Philip LaZebnik	May 3, 1990	23.6
4	"Return to Nantucket"	Noam Pitlik	David Angell	May 10, 1990	21.8
Brian flies through the fog to Boston to see if he can reunite with his ex-wife (and Joe's ex-fiancée) Carol (Kim Johnston Ulrich). Joe and Brian compete to see who Carol loves more. Helen falls into old habits.
5	"There Once Was a Girl from Nantucket"	Noam Pitlik	Dave Hackel	May 17, 1990	22.0
Brian sets Joe up on a blind date with Cindy McGrath (Megan Mullally), a drugstore cosmetics clerk with an "easy" reputation.
6	"All for One and Two for Helen"	Noam Pitlik	Dave Hackel	May 24, 1990	21.3
Joe spies on Brian and Helen when he thinks they're on a date.

=== Season 2 (1990–91) ===
No. overall	No. in season	Title	Directed by	Written by	Original release date	US viewers (millions)
7	1	"The Puppetmaster"	Noam Pitlik	Philip LaZebnik	September 28, 1990	13.4
In order to get Helen to break her vow that she does not date pilots, Brian hires an actor (Craig Bierko) to play the role of a charming pilot who asks Helen out.
8	2	"The Story of Joe"	Noam Pitlik	Bruce Rasmussen	October 5, 1990	13.5
A magazine writer is on the island to do a cover story on Joe, but after he meets Brian he finds Brian's life more interesting. Cliff Clavin (John Ratzenberger) and Norm Peterson (George Wendt) visit the island.
9	3	"A Little Nightmare Music"	Noam Pitlik	Bryan Winter	October 12, 1990	15.0
Brian schemes to get Helen an audition for a very famous conductor (David Ogden Stiers), who tells her she's terrible. Helen decides to give up the cello gaining a new level of peace, until she is thrown for a loop when the conductor concludes that with considerable effort she could show promise.
10	4	"Sports and Leisure"	Noam Pitlik	David Angell	October 19, 1990	11.2
Fay keeps inviting Roy to group events despite how much the group dislikes him. Roy asks for help from Joe on how to be a nice guy and tries to make friends with the gang by joining them in a friendly game of Trivial Pursuit. Unfortunately, Lowell is his partner.
11	5	"A Stand Up Kind of Guy"	Noam Pitlik	Dave Hackel	October 26, 1990	13.1
Joe holds a bachelor party for Jerry Stark, a guy he can't remember going to high school with despite Jerry claiming Joe is his oldest and best friend. No one else on the island seems to know Jerry until the party's exotic dancer turns out to be his long lost love, suddenly putting the whole wedding in disarray. When Joe admits to the man that he cannot remember him, he thinks Joe is a great practical joker.
12	6	"It's Not the Thought, It's the Gift"	Noam Pitlik	Peter Casey & David Lee	November 9, 1990	12.2
Helen has received a birthday package from her parents which includes some old home movies. Joe and Brian compete to see who gets Helen a more expensive birthday gift. Brian gives Helen a CD player and makes Joe jealous. After arguing about the gift, Joe gives Helen his mother’s cameo pin. Helen realizes the significance while watching her home movies after he leaves. Subplot: Fay helps Lowell with his budget.
13	7	"Hell Hath No Fury like a Policewoman Scorned"	Noam Pitlik	Bill Diamond & Michael Saltzman	November 16, 1990	12.8
Brian is roped into dating a policewoman to get her to drop charges on his unpaid parking tickets. Unfortunately she's not his type and is very vindictive. Subplot: Lowell tries to capture something funny on his video camera for "America's Wackiest Videos."
14	8	"High Anxiety"	Noam Pitlik	Bruce Rasmussen	November 23, 1990	14.8
Joe is grounded due to hypertension with the unreliable Brian his only option for keeping the airline running. When Brian quits and Joe can't afford a new pilot Sandpiper's future seems in doubt. Guest star: Robert Colbert.
15	9	"Friends or Lovers?"	Noam Pitlik	David Lloyd	December 7, 1990	11.9
Brian hires high school student Kenny McElvey (Michael Manasseri) as a backup pilot for the still-grounded Joe. Joe and Helen decide to go on their first date and try to keep it from Brian. Joe and Helen decide they may be better as friends.
16	10	"There's Always Room for Cello"	Noam Pitlik	Peter Casey & David Lee	December 14, 1990	11.5
Roy's son R.J. (Abraham Benrubi) takes cello lessons from Helen. Roy agrees to pay for the lessons after he thinks R.J. is "hot for teacher," but the truth is R.J. is gay. An enraged Roy then challenges R.J. to a one-on-one basketball match in which R.J. is not allowed to be gay if he loses.
17	11	"A Terminal Christmas"	Noam Pitlik	Bill Diamond & Michael Saltzman	December 21, 1990	11.1
After all their plans for Christmas go badly, the gang tries to cheer Fay up who is having her first Christmas without her husband.
18	12	"Airport '90"	Noam Pitlik	Bruce Rasmussen	January 3, 1991	28.1
After Helen asks to learn how to fly, Joe starts a flight school. Helen, annoyed with Joe's classroom ways, takes Brian up on his offer to let her fly the Sandpiper plane, despite her being unlicensed. When turbulence knocks Brian out Joe has to talk Helen through the landing. After the landing Joe and Helen realize life is too short and decide to start dating.
19	13	"Love Is Like Pulling Teeth"	Noam Pitlik	Dave Hackel	January 10, 1991	24.5
Joe has to take care of Helen when she gets her wisdom teeth pulled out. Unfortunately for Joe, her appointment falls on the same day as a gathering based around a much anticipated college basketball game and Helen's TV is in the shop.
20	14	"The Tennis Bum"	Noam Pitlik	Peter S. Mehlman	January 24, 1991	22.2
Brian's upset because Fay beat him at tennis. Meanwhile, Roy tries to mess with Helen's mind by claiming that one of his male pilots is actually female, and Joe accidentally destroys Lowell's beloved Graf Zeppelin model.
21	15	"My Brother's Back and There's Going to Be Trouble"	Noam Pitlik	Bill Diamond & Michael Saltzman	January 31, 1991	22.5
Joe is hospitalized for back trouble and leaves his normally overly detailed schedule for Brian to manage Sandpiper. Brian disregards Joe's schedule and runs the airline his own way. All his schemes suddenly go off the rails when the plane goes missing.
22	16	"Plane Nine from Nantucket"	Noam Pitlik	Philip LaZebnik	February 7, 1991	22.7
Joe and Brian think they spotted a UFO but Joe is reluctant to report it to the FAA for fear of Sandpiper becoming a joke. Meanwhile, Helen and Fay squabble over a lunch bill.
23	17	"Looking for Love in All the Wrong Places"	Noam Pitlik	Bill Diamond & Michael Saltzman	February 14, 1991	22.8
After a disastrous start to Valentine's Day, Joe and Helen agree to meet at their special place. Unfortunately, they each have a different idea as to where that is. First appearance of Tony Shalhoub as Antonio Scarpacci, portraying a waiter.
24	18	"Love Means Never Having to Say Geronimo"	Noam Pitlik	Bruce Rasmussen	February 21, 1991	23.9
Joe and Helen want to spend time alone together, but Brian keeps interrupting them. After they kick him out of the house, Brian meets Gwen, a very spontaneous woman who convinces Brian to marry her... while jumping out of an airplane. Joe and Helen try to talk them out of it only to find they're no match for Gwen.
25	19	"All in the Family"	Noam Pitlik	Bryan Winter	March 7, 1991	23.1
Brian dates young pilot Kenny's mother. Knowing Brian's ways with women, Kenny isn't thrilled. Subplot: Joe is paranoid that Helen is keeping a secret from him after she finds the name of an ex in his little black book.
26	20	"Mother Wore Stripes"	Noam Pitlik	David Lloyd	March 14, 1991	23.1
Joe and Brian’s estranged mother returns to reconnect with her sons. Brian is thrilled but Joe feigns apathy to hide his anger for having to be the responsible one of the Hackett household.
27	21	"Murder She Roast"	Noam Pitlik	Dave Hackel	March 21, 1991	23.1
When Brian sees a woman who looks like Fay on a TV show about escaped fugitives (hosted by Maury Povich) he's convinced Fay is the killer and is trying to murder him.
28	22	"Duet for Cello and Plane"	Noam Pitlik	Philip LaZebnik	March 28, 1991	23.3
Helen gets a music job with the Maine symphony orchestra forcing her and Joe to talk about their future. Joe and Helen have a messy fight and break up after neither is able to commit to changing their life for the other. When the symphony job falls through, Helen leaves for New York City.

=== Season 3 (1991–92) ===
No. overall	No. in season	Title	Directed by	Written by	Original release date	US viewers (millions)
29	1	"The Naked Truth"	Andy Ackerman	Dave Hackel	September 26, 1991	22.4
After struggling in New York for ten months and resorting to waiting tables at a strip joint, Helen relents and wishes to return to Nantucket. Joe and Brian bring her back, but Joe does not mention that he has a new girlfriend, Gail, even though he and Helen had already broken up. Helen reacts to the news by driving her Jeep Wrangler through Joe's office.
30	2	"Is That a Subpoena in Your Pocket?"	Andy Ackerman	Bill Diamond & Michael Saltzman	October 3, 1991	24.4
Joe sues Helen for running into his office. However, not even small-claims court can change Helen's anger. Tony Shalhoub joins the cast permanently as Antonio Scarpacci, former restaurant waiter who now is a cab driver.
31	3	"The Taming of the Shrew"	Andy Ackerman	Christopher Lloyd	October 10, 1991	22.5
Helen goes to a group therapy session to deal with her anger towards Joe.
32	4	"I Ain't Got No Bunny"	Andy Ackerman	Ken Levine & David Isaacs	October 17, 1991	18.8
Lowell becomes paranoid, thinking that his wife Bunny (Laura Innes) is committing adultery. Lowell soon learns that paranoia does not nullify concern.
33	5	"If Elected, I Will Not Live"	Andy Ackerman	Larry Balmagia	October 24, 1991	21.3
Roy and Joe both run for the position of alderman, but the local paper somehow endorses Fay. Subplot: Helen decides to sell her cello.
34	6	"My Brother's Keeper"	Andy Ackerman	David Lloyd	October 31, 1991	22.7
When a rich woman, Mimsy Borogroves (Tyne Daly), comes to the island, she starts dating Brian.
35	7	"Crate Expectations"	Andy Ackerman	Dave Hackel	November 7, 1991	21.4
The gang plans a surprise birthday for Joe.
36	8	"Ladies Who Lunch"	Andy Ackerman	Kathryn Baker	November 14, 1991	23.3
Joe doesn't like it when Helen becomes friends with his new girlfriend Gail. In a subplot, Roy tries to sneak aboard Air Force One when President George H. W. Bush and First Lady Barbara Bush are visiting Nantucket so he can bolster his political credibility. Fay also tries to sneak aboard so she can shake hands with Barbara Bush in order to keep her streak of touching every President's wife ever since Eleanor Roosevelt gave Fay a pat on the head when she was a little girl. Gail breaks up with Joe and ends her friendship with Helen when she sees the both of them having a messy fight, clearly not over each other but not ready to rekindle their romance. As Joe mopes about no one else having a worse day than him, a news report shows Roy getting arrested for trespassing on Air Force One.
37	9	"Try to Remember the Night He Dismembered"	Andy Ackerman	Bill Diamond & Michael Saltzman	November 21, 1991	22.5
With the airport fogged in, Brian entertains the gang with his hypnosis act and gets Roy to confess his deepest, darkest secret: he stole $250,000 from an old man at a local Norwegian restaurant and buried it in his backyard. As everyone excitedly digs up Roy's backyard, Brian wonders how effective his hypnosis was.
38	10	"The Late Mrs. Biggins"	Andy Ackerman	Steven Levitan	November 28, 1991	21.4
Roy reveals the fact that his late wife is not dead, she left him.
39	11	"The Bogey Men"	Andy Ackerman	Larry Balmagia	December 12, 1991	21.9
Roy and Brian trick Joe into coming with them to a timeshare lecture in South Carolina, to which both Brian and Roy assure Joe that they know how to finesse these hucksters and can use it for free golf, but a rainstorm ruins their plan. Subplot: Antonio plays the only song he knows on guitar ("Michael, Row the Boat Ashore") over and over, entertaining the passengers, but annoying Helen.
40	12	"Marriage, Italian Style"	Andy Ackerman	Christopher Lloyd	January 9, 1992	20.9
Antonio's visa is not renewed and his deportment to Italy is imminent. Helen offers to marry Antonio so he can remain in the United States. (Part 1 of a two-part episode.)
41	13	"Divorce, American Style"	Andy Ackerman	Steven Levitan	January 16, 1992	23.4
Helen learns that she will get arrested for matrimony fraud if she divorces Antonio before three years have elapsed, unless he wins a green card in a lottery. Antonio is ambiguous about whether or not he won, suggesting he has genuine feelings for Helen. (Part 2 of a two-part episode.)
42	14	"Stew in a Stew"	Andy Ackerman	David Angell	January 23, 1992	20.1
Fay is upset when Joe declines to give her a raise, citing budget cutbacks. But when Joe appears with expensive sheep-lined bomber jackets for him and Brian, Fay is outraged and quits. Joe has to eat several slices of humble pie to convince Fay of their partnership. Note: This episode shows a flashback of how Joe met Fay when she was a stewardess, and they decided to start Sandpiper Air.
43	15	"This Old House"	Andy Ackerman	David Lloyd	February 6, 1992	22.0
Joe and Brian's childhood home is due to be demolished after a severe storm condemns it. At first they're upset, but then they can't really recall many happy memories of being there.
44	16	"Planes, Trains, and Visiting Cranes"	Andy Ackerman	Ken Levine & David Isaacs	February 13, 1992	20.9
In this Cheers crossover episode, Frasier Crane (Kelsey Grammer) visits the island with his then-wife Lilith Sternin (Bebe Neuwirth), and Helen wants her money back from one of his self-help seminars.
45	17	"Das Plane"	Andy Ackerman	Bill Diamond & Michael Saltzman	February 20, 1992	18.5
Joe announces Sandpiper will give a plane ticket anywhere to whoever makes the biggest donation to charity by a specific deadline. Cranky Carlton Blanchard (William Hickey) wins by donating $10,000. The catch is Carlton wants to fly cross-country to reunite with his estranged brother, and along the way, annoys everyone on the plane. Furthermore, Carlton has a dull memory, as he cannot recall whether his brother lives in Rock Springs, Wyoming or Las Cruces, New Mexico.
46	18	"Take My Life, Please"	Andy Ackerman	Christopher Lloyd	February 27, 1992	23.0
Helen wants a new goal in life and takes an aptitude test. When the results are in, the gang intercepts the letter and sees her best skills are food service and musician. In order to avoid the forthcoming guilt, anger and depression from her, Brian falsifies the paper, which prompts Helen to aspire to become a stand-up comedienne. Guest appearance by Oliver North as himself.
47	19	"Four Dates That Will Live in Infamy"	Andy Ackerman	Dave Hackel	April 2, 1992	21.4
Joe, Brian, Helen and Lowell try out a video dating service and compare notes to each other's experiences. Brian gets matched up with a pushy trader (Peri Gilpin), Helen gets matched up with a local waiter who conscripts Helen into his work, Joe gets matched up with a ventriloquist who will not talk but her dummy has a crush on Joe, and Lowell gets matched up with an ordinary woman, but his idea of a fun date is to take her on a ride on the forklift.
48	20	"The Bank Dick"	Andy Ackerman	David Lloyd	April 23, 1992	19.2
Brian gets a large tax refund and treats himself to an expensive vacation in Barbuda. When he learns the refund was in error and the IRS is demanding the money back, he is subject to a tirade from responsible Joe, who advised him to save the refund instead. Brian gets a second job as a security guard at a bank to earn the money. In the subplot, "Responsible Joe" seems to only be so in financial matters, as he is taking a girl he is dating to Fenway Park for an opening day Red Sox game despite the fact that Helen paid for the tickets when she was dating Joe. This is one of the few episodes where the subplot and main plot collide.
49	21	"Say It Ain't So, Joe"	Andy Ackerman	Steven Levitan	April 30, 1992	22.6
Joe is reunited with his old baseball coach Snyder (Brian Doyle-Murray) who touts his new star pitcher Ty Warner (Matthew Fox) who is poised to break Joe's longstanding record at Siasconset High School for the most strikeouts. This causes Joe to feel both anger and jealousy at his age and station in life.
50	22	"As Fate Would Have It"	Andy Ackerman	Larry Balmagia	May 7, 1992	22.1
The gang accompanies Helen to her gig as a cellist for the Boston Symphony Orchestra. But on the way there, the plane's engines die.

=== Season 4 (1992–93) ===
No. overall	No. in season	Title	Directed by	Written by	Original release date	US viewers (millions)
51	1	"Lifeboat"	Andy Ackerman	Christopher Lloyd	September 24, 1992	24.3
The gang waits to be rescued from the plane crash. After making it back home, Joe considers whether it is time for Sandpiper to close up shop.
52	2	"The Fortune Cookie"	Andy Ackerman	David Lloyd	October 1, 1992	20.0
The amount of insurance money Joe gets for the plane is so low that Brian tries to get Joe to fake being handicapped.
53	3	"Noses Off"	Andy Ackerman	Ken Levine & David Isaacs	October 8, 1992	19.8
When a plastic surgeon informs Brian of his imperfect nose, he plans to get a new one.
54	4	"Blackout Biggins"	Andy Ackerman	Steven Levitan	October 22, 1992	17.5
Roy faints when he tries to sing the National Anthem at a Red Sox game.
55	5	"Mathers of the Heart"	Andy Ackerman	Adam Belanoff	October 29, 1992	21.1
Lowell goes on a date with Helen.
56	6	"Two Jerks and a Jill"	David Lee and Andy Ackerman	Dave Hackel	November 5, 1992	23.4
When a female helicopter pilot, Alex Lambert (Farrah Forke) moves to the island, Joe and Brian compete to impress her. Subplot: Lowell invites Antonio to join him and his friends for their Tuesday night rat shoot at the local dump, and is upset when Antonio shoots more rats than he does.
57	7	"It's So Nice to Have a Mather Around the House"	David Lee	Ken Levine & David Isaacs	November 12, 1992	24.3
Brian sinks Lowell's houseboat, so he lets Lowell stay with him and Joe. When Lowell proves to be a surprisingly adept chef, Joe and Brian wonder whether they should hide Lowell's insurance check.
58	8	"Just Say No"	Andy Ackerman	Adam Belanoff	November 19, 1992	20.4
Shannon Moss (Teri Austin), a woman Brian is obsessed with comes back to the island, and Brian can't seem to say no to her, even though she stands him up several times.
59	9	"It May Have Happened One Night"	Andy Ackerman	Christopher Lloyd	December 3, 1992	20.6
Everyone's trying to find out whether or not Joe slept with Alex.
60	10	"The Customer's Usually Right"	Leonard R. Garner Jr.	Janet Leahy	December 17, 1992	22.1
In this Christmas episode, Joe has a meltdown when he's charged a 50-cent rewinding fee on a videotape he is sure he rewound.
61	11	"Exit Laughing"	Andy Ackerman	Larry Balmagia	January 7, 1993	21.2
Helen goes on a date with a friend of Joe's (Steven Eckholdt), who laughs like a hyena. Subplot: Roy helps Antonio with an irritating neighbor who uses a leaf blower.
62	12	"What the Cabbie Saw"	Judy Pioli	Steven Levitan	January 14, 1993	22.8
Antonio fears for his life when he testifies against a jewelry store robber.
63	13	"Labor Pains"	Andy Ackerman	Dave Hackel	January 28, 1993	N/A
Lowell has been offered a job at Logan Airport in Boston, but he doesn't want to leave Nantucket.
64	14	"I've Got a Secret"	Andy Ackerman	Adam Belanoff	February 4, 1993	17.4
Alex thinks Antonio blabbed her secret about posing for Playboy.
65	15	"The Gift"	Andy Ackerman	David Angell	February 11, 1993	18.7
66	16	"The Gift"	Andy Ackerman	David Angell	February 18, 1993	17.5
Joe mortgages his house to buy Helen a new cello so she can audition for a string quartet. Helen gets the job, but the string quartet drives her crazy. Subplot: Fay, Lowell, Roy and Antonio rehearse for a community theatre play titled "Phantom of the Oprah".
67	17	"I Love Brian"	Andy Ackerman	Ian Gurvitz	February 25, 1993	20.1
Brian tries to impress Alex by telling her he knows Clint Black. Subplot: Antonio becomes a fan of I Love Lucy. Kirstie Alley makes a cameo as Rebecca Howe from Cheers.
68	18	"The Key to Alex"	Andy Ackerman	David Lloyd	April 8, 1993	13.1
After Helen agrees to a date with a sensitive guy she just met, Joe and Brian try to be more sensitive to get to Alex. Subplot: Lowell wants a nickname.
69	19	"The Houseguest"	Andy Ackerman	Bill Diamond & Michael Saltzman	April 15, 1993	15.1
When Carlton Blanchard (William Hickey) falls down the stairs at Helen's house, she lets him stay with her until his ankle heals, fearing a lawsuit.
70	20	"Goodbye, Old Friend"	Andy Ackerman	Christopher Lloyd	April 29, 1993	18.1
Lowell has a hard time accepting that a long-time mechanic friend of his, Weeb Gilroy, has died. Subplot: Joe and Brian have to keep an already sleepless Helen awake for another 18 hours after she suffers a concussion.
71	21	"Another Wedding"	Andy Ackerman	Larry Balmagia	May 6, 1993	17.3
The gang gets invited to attend the wedding of Walter, the airport's air traffic controller.
72	22	"Date Package Number Seven"	Andy Ackerman	Steven Levitan	May 13, 1993	18.3
Brian tries to impress Alex with a spontaneous date to Maine, but the date is pre-planned.

=== Season 5 (1993–94) ===
No. overall	No. in season	Title	Directed by	Written by	Original release date	US viewers (millions)
73	1	"Stop in the Name of Love"	Andy Ackerman	Dave Hackel	September 16, 1993	19.8
Everyone is skeptical when Brian tells them his relationship with Alex is different from all his past ones.
74	2	"Terminal Jealousy"	Leonard R. Garner Jr.	Mark Reisman	September 23, 1993	20.8
Roy gets bored and decides to have some fun at everyone else's expense.
75	3	"Bye-Bye, Bunny"	Leonard R. Garner Jr.	Ian Gurvitz	September 30, 1993	20.2
After Lowell finalizes his divorce with his wife Bunny, he starts sleeping with her again.
76	4	"Business or Pleasure"	Leonard R. Garner Jr.	Steven Levitan	October 7, 1993	20.7
When Joe flies in potential investor Davis Lynch (Mark Harelik), he's more interested in Helen than in Sandpiper.
77	5	"An Affair to Forget"	Andy Ackerman	Dave Hackel	October 14, 1993	21.2
Joe becomes everyone's chauffeur; first for Brian and Alex, then for Helen.
78	6	"A Black Eye Affair"	Andy Ackerman	Steven Levitan	October 28, 1993	23.3
Helen gets a black eye before her date with Davis.
79	7	"Joe Blows"	David Lee	Steven Levitan	November 4, 1993	24.0
80	8	"Joe Blows"	Leonard R. Garner Jr.	Ian Gurvitz	November 11, 1993	20.7
Joe leaves the island because he got tired of everyone running to him with their problems. Brian is now in charge of Sandpiper and realizes how much he needs Joe. Kevin Connolly guest stars.
81	9	"2 Good 2 Be 4 Gotten"	Leonard R. Garner Jr.	Rick Copp & David A. Goodman	November 18, 1993	19.9
When Sandy Cooper (Valerie Mahaffey), an old high school classmate, returns to Nantucket, Joe fears she's still obsessed with him. Subplot: Antonio tries to sell some of his personal items to raise money for his family back in Italy.
82	10	"Come Fly with Me"	Leonard R. Garner Jr.	Howard Gewirtz	December 2, 1993	19.5
Joe, Brian, Helen and Lowell go to a singles party in Boston. Back at the airport, Roy, Fay and Antonio team up to try to win a radio call-in contest.
83	11	"Happy Holidays"	Andy Ackerman	Mark Reisman	December 16, 1993	19.8
It's Christmas, and Lowell's ex-wife Bunny shows up and ends up sleeping with Antonio. Subplots: Brian is skeptical about meeting Alex's family and Fay becomes overbearing in preparing for the annual holiday party.
84	12	"Ready, Teddy, Go"	Andy Ackerman	Joyce Gittlin	January 6, 1994	25.8
Helen's upset because she thinks Davis bought her a teddy.
85	13	"Oh Give Me a Home Where the Mathers Don't Roam"	Peter Bonerz	Shelly Landau	January 20, 1994	21.8
Lowell buys a new house, but is afraid to live there alone.
86	14	"The Faygitive"	Peter Bonerz	Shelly Landau	January 27, 1994	25.7
Fay thinks she's being stalked when a P.I. starts asking questions.
87	15	"Say Uncle, Carlton"	Peter Bonerz	Steven Levitan	February 3, 1994	25.6
Antonio chauffeurs Carlton Blanchard (William Hickey) around the island for extra money. Carlton's equally irritating nephew Lewis (Gilbert Gottfried) also visits the island.
88	16	"Hey, Nineteen"	Peter Bonerz	Howard Gewirtz	February 10, 1994	27.6
Joe dates a 19-year-old college student (Liz Vassey) that Helen babysat when she herself was 19.
89	17	"Exclusively Yours"	Peter Bonerz	David Lloyd	February 14, 1994	13.9
Brian and Alex vow to date only each other. Guest star: Lee Garlington.
90	18	"Moonlighting"	Peter Bonerz	Ian Gurvitz	February 17, 1994	15.0
The gang recalls odd jobs they've had during the off-season.
91	19	"Sleepless in Nantucket"	Peter Bonerz	Jeffrey Richman & Joyce Gittlin	March 10, 1994	20.7
Brian moves in with Alex, and they find each other hard to live with.
92	20	"Boys Will Be Girls"	Peter Bonerz	David Lloyd	April 7, 1994	21.6
Dan Mattay (Jack Ging), Joe and Brian's mean-spirited football coach from Siasconset High, returns to Nantucket as the school is dedicating the gymnasium in his honor. As revenge for all his insults and torture, Joe and Brian sneak into Coach Mattay's hotel room in the middle of the night and dress him up in drag as a prank, unaware that he just died in his sleep.
93	21	"Roy Crazy"	Peter Bonerz	Mark Reisman	April 14, 1994	17.3
Roy's ex-wife Sylvia (Concetta Tomei) shows up, and Roy tries to win her back. Subplot: A waiter from a local restaurant goes gaga over Helen.
94	22	"Long Distance Lament"	Peter Bonerz	Shelly Landau	April 28, 1994	17.9
When Davis cancels another date with Helen, she decides to date another guy.
95	23	"Call of the Wild"	Leonard R. Garner, Jr.	Howard Gewirtz & Steven Levitan	May 5, 1994	18.4
Danny (Charles Rocket), an old friend of Brian's, shows up, and they relive some wild times, much to Alex's dismay. Lowell takes in his idol, an over-the-hill television superhero (Robert Ridgely), who takes advantage of his hospitality.
96	24	"A Decent Proposal"	Peter Bonerz	Mark Reisman & Ian Gurvitz	May 12, 1994	17.7
Davis proposes to Helen, but Joe still has feelings for her. Subplot: Brian tries to win Alex back. Ray Charles makes a cameo appearance in the teaser.: Note: This was Farrah Forke's final appearance as a cast regular; she would make a guest appearance in the following season.

=== Season 6 (1994–95) ===
No. overall	No. in season	Title	Directed by	Written by	Original release date	Prod. code	US viewers (millions)
97	1	"Whose Wife Is It Anyway?"	Leonard R. Garner Jr.	Ian Gurvitz	September 20, 1994	40346-097	16.7
Joe's determined to win back Helen, so he goes to New York to stop her from marrying Davis Lynch.
98	2	"Twisted Sister"	David Lee	Steven Levitan	September 27, 1994	40346-098	19.6
Helen's snobby sister Casey (Amy Yasbeck) shows up. When Joe and Helen confront Casey, she reveals a big secret of her own.
99	3	"The Shrink"	Leonard R. Garner Jr.	Mark Reisman	October 4, 1994	40346-099	19.2
Joe takes Brian to see a psychiatrist (George Plimpton), but he ends up treating Joe instead. Subplot: Lowell goes on a search for his favorite hat that Antonio lost.
100	4	"The Spark and How to Get It"	Leonard R. Garner Jr.	Howard Gewirtz	October 11, 1994	40346-100	19.2
After his therapist pronounces him fully recovered from his break-up with Alex, Brian plunges back into the dating world. His efforts at the Club Car yield nothing of interest (despite Antonio's assistance with the "Good Cop, Bad Cop" routine), so he follows the advice of others and starts dating casual friend Joan. That elusive "spark" that is missing from their first three dates finally comes to life when Brian breaks up with her. Meanwhile, Lowell prepares a commencement speech address for his alma mater and Casey has trouble getting a good haircut.
101	5	"The Waxman Cometh"	Leonard R. Garner Jr.	Shelly Landau	October 18, 1994	40346-101	18.2
After receiving $20,000 from his family's trust fund, Lowell invests the money in an old wax museum. Despite everyone's doubts about it, Lowell renovates the museum and renames it "Lowell Mather's House O' Wax", but at the lackluster grand reopening, he comes to realize that running the museum won't be easy. When fire ravages the museum, Lowell is determined to start again from scratch, but after realizing that the museum has fire insurance, he's just thankful to get his money back.
102	6	"Is That a Ten Foot Sandwich or Are You Just Glad to See Me?"	Jeff Melman	Ellen Byron & Lissa Kapstrom	November 1, 1994	40346-102	19.9
Joe and Helen just want some time alone with one and another, but Brian and Casey continually interrupt them. To apologize, Brian and Casey decide to surprise them with an engagement party, but Antonio misinterprets an overheard conversation and believes Brian to be sleeping with Casey. When she hears about it, Helen drags Joe to the party site well before they are expected.
103	7	"All's Fare"	Leonard R. Garner Jr.	Steven Levitan	November 8, 1994	40346-104	16.6
Lovesick Antonio finally works up the nerve to ask Casey on a date, but before he's able to, he must earn some money to pay his back taxes. Antonio ends up working as a chauffeur to a successful businessman (Jonathan Frakes) who also has his eye on Casey. However, when this man has the attitude of "what goes onboard ship stays onboard ship", both Antonio and Casey are forced to look to themselves for who they really are: Antonio about how integrity and honor vs. success and money, and Casey for seeing more to men than their ability to take care of a wife.
104	8	"Miss Jenkins"	Leonard R. Garner Jr.	Michael Sardo	November 15, 1994	40346-103	14.6
Brian's attractive ninth-grade teacher Laurie Jenkins (Peggy Lipton) shows up, and he goes out with her. Although Joe and Lowell are thrilled that Brian is "hot for teacher", he cannot get over the fact she is an older woman who once taught him. TV legend Soupy Sales makes a cameo appearance in the teaser as a "Simon Says" competitor who courts Roy's mother.
105	9	"If It's Not One Thing, It's Your Mother"	Jeff Melman	Joyce Gittlin & Jeffrey Richman	November 22, 1994	40346-105	18.1
Helen and Casey's mother Dee Dee (Debbie Reynolds) comes to the island to help plan the wedding. Subplots include Fay and Roy splitting a ticket to see Barbra Streisand, and Brian and Lowell compete to see who can eat more of Dee Dee's food.
106	10	"The Wrong Stuff"	Leonard R. Garner Jr.	David Lloyd	November 29, 1994	40346-106	17.7
When Sandpiper is losing business to Aeromass, Brian tries a celebrity endorsement by hiring an ex-astronaut (Robert Culp), but the guy turns out to be even more obnoxious than Roy. Despite his private bluster, the astronaut's excellent public image is helping Sandpiper business, but can they bank on it?
107	11	"Insanity Claus"	Leonard R. Garner Jr.	Ian Gurvitz	December 13, 1994	40346-107	18.1
When an air traffic controller (Dann Florek) finds out Antonio ate his donut, he holds the entire airport hostage on Christmas Eve, with Antonio at gunpoint in the control tower. In getting to know the man, he admits he was on edge because his wife was committing adultery, but the gang soon learns Antonio was the one she was having the fling with.
108	12	"She's ... Back"	Rick Beren	Rick Copp & David A. Goodman	January 3, 1995	40346-108	20.8
Sandy Cooper (Valerie Mahaffey) is back on the island, and Joe tries again to get anyone to believe she's obsessed with him. Subplot: Fay gives Antonio her third husband's wardrobe, which makes Antonio the butt of 1970s jokes.
109	13	"Have I Got a Couple for You"	Jeff Melman	Mark Reisman	January 10, 1995	40346-109	17.9
Fay sets Joe and Helen up with another married couple whom they love, but they get a little too clingy with the other couple. Subplots: Antonio assists Lowell after he injures his hands working on Antonio's taxi, and Brian and Casey try out a new singles place in Boston.
110	14	"Fools Russian"	Jeff Melman	Howard Gewirtz	January 31, 1995	40346-110	16.9
Roy plans to marry a mail-order bride from Russia, but problems arise when Helen sees she is better suited for a professor from Boston University.
111	15	"Let's Call the Whole Thing Off"	Jeff Melman	Ellen Byron & Lissa Kapstrom	February 7, 1995	40346-111	17.2
Joe and Helen crash a wedding to see how much things will cost, and end up getting into a fight which spills over onto the bride and groom. Subplot: Lowell and Antonio train for a Polar Bears water jump competition.
112	16	"Remembrance of Flings Past"	Jeff Melman	Ian Gurvitz	February 9, 1995	40340-112	30.0
113	17	"Remembrance of Flings Past"	Jeff Melman	Howard Gewirtz & Steven Levitan	February 14, 1995	40340-113	17.2
Part 1: It's the gang's high school reunion, and Brian's old girlfriend shows up, informing Joe that he might be the father of her child. Part 2: Joe has to wait for blood test results to come back to find out whether or not he's the boy's father. The waiting game is tense for all as Brian has to deal with his ex-girlfriend having a fling with Joe, which also goes over poorly with Helen. Although Joe was not dating Helen when this happened, the fact he may have a son is a trust issue for their upcoming wedding.
114	18	"Gone But Not Faygotten"	Leonard R. Garner Jr.	Shelly Landau & Michael Sardo	February 21, 1995	40340-114	19.3
Fay retires and Casey takes her place behind the ticket counter, proving to be adept at the job. When Fay returns wanting her job back, Sandpiper runs into human resource problems.
115	19	"Ex, Lies and Videotape"	Jeff Melman	Ellen Byron & Lissa Kapstrom	February 28, 1995	40340-116	18.6
Brian appears on a popular woman's talk show hosted by Mary Pat Lee (Caroline Aaron), but it turns out to be a trap set up by his ex-girlfriend Alex (Farrah Forke in a guest appearance).
116	20	"Portrait of the Con Artist as a Young Man"	Ken Levine	Joyce Gittlin & Jeffrey Richman	March 21, 1995	40340-115	17.9
Casey gets interested in the sculptures Lowell makes out of old plane parts, and wants him to make a career of it. Subplot: Brian takes a prank snapshot which ends up in the wrong hands.
117	21	"The Love Life and Times of Joe and Helen"	Jeff Melman	Steven Levitan	April 4, 1995	40340-117	18.3
Brian makes a video diary of Joe and Helen's relationship for them as a wedding gift.
118	22	"A House to Die For"	Jeff Melman	David Lloyd	May 2, 1995	40340-120	11.9
Cranky Carlton Blanchard is at death's door, and everyone goes to his house to set what they can buy from his greedy nephew. The kids from The Brady Bunch Movie make a cameo appearance when Helen dreams she is Marcia.
119	23	"Nuptials Off"	Jeff Melman	Michael Sardo	May 9, 1995	40340-118	11.5
Helen realizes she never sent in the paperwork to divorce her and Antonio. So she enlists the help of Brian to fly her and Antonio to Mexico to get a divorce before Joe finds out. Subplot: Lowell refuses to rest despite his obvious signs of illness.
120	24	"Et Tu, Antonio?"	Leonard R. Garner Jr.	Ian Gurvitz & Mark Reisman	May 16, 1995	40340-119	12.7
Antonio plays host to his cousin, who is engaged to a beautiful woman. Subplot: Joe and Helen receive their first wedding gifts, but the ones from Helen's side are better than those from Joe's side.
121	25	"Boys Just Wanna Have Fun"	Rick Beren	Michael Sardo & Shelly Landau	May 23, 1995	40340-121	17.9
Casey throws Helen a bachelorette party and Brian throws Joe a bachelor party. But Helen has a better time at her party than Joe does at his.
122	26	"Here It Is: The Big Wedding"	Jeff Melman	Ellen Byron & Lissa Kapstrom	May 23, 1995	40340-122	17.9
Joe and Helen are finally set to get married, except for a few minor setbacks, such as Joe dropping Helen's wedding ring in the toilet and getting his hand stuck, and Brian picking up the wrong size tuxedos. This was Thomas Haden Church's last appearance as a cast regular, having made one final appearance in the next season.

=== Season 7 (1995–96) ===
No. overall	No. in season	Title	Directed by	Written by	Original release date	US viewers (millions)
123	1	"Burnin' Down the House"	Jeff Melman	Ian Gurvitz	September 19, 1995	16.9
124	2	"Burnin' Down the House"	Jeff Melman	Howard Gewirtz	September 26, 1995	16.3
Part 1: Joe and Helen return from their honeymoon in Jamaica to discover that their house burned down. Joe tries to find the root cause, but when he learns it was Brian (who unknowingly threw Casey's clothes too close to the fireplace hearth while having sex with her), he fires Brian from Sandpiper and disowns him. Subplot: Antonio hopes for one more shot at winning Casey's heart. Rebecca Schull does not appear in the episode. Part 2: While digging through the remains of Helen's house, Brian discovers the old suitcase their late father left them and tries to use it to make up with Joe. Joe is extremely reluctant, until he is visited by his father's ghost (Don Murray), who uses reverse psychology to get Joe to reconcile with Brian. Subplots: Helen has her own method of revenge on Casey and Antonio exacts his revenge on both Casey and Brian.
125	3	"Death Becomes Him"	Leonard R. Garner Jr.	Mark Reisman & Ian Gurvitz	October 10, 1995	19.9
Sandpiper is chartered by Eleanor Kingsbury (Marian Seldes) to fly to Miami to retrieve the body of her late father Harrison, Nantucket's richest man, for his funeral service. While in Miami, Joe and Brian live it up and party, but when a buzzed Joe picks up the wrong corpse the next day, he must become the replacement corpse until Kingsbury's body can be found and switched. At the funeral, Joe overhears shocking evidence of the actual cause of Kingsbury's death.
126	4	"The Person Formerly Known as Lowell"	Jeff Melman	Mark Reisman	October 31, 1995	12.7
When Lowell witnesses a mob hit, he must decide whether or not to enter the Witness Protection Program, struggling with the issue of leaving his friends behind forever versus letting a guilty man run free and hurt again should Lowell not testify in court. This was Thomas Haden Church's final appearance on the show.
127	5	"Hooker, Line, and Sinker"	Rick Beren	Christopher Vane	November 7, 1995	17.7
Joe and Brian set up Antonio with a fabulous woman, only to later discover that she is a call girl. Subplot: When Casey shows drawing talent, Roy shows her a manuscript to a children's book he wrote, asking if she would illustrate it.
128	6	"She's Gotta Have It"	Jeff Melman	Ellen Byron & Lissa Kapstrom	November 14, 1995	16.3
Helen goes on a wild shopping spree with her insurance check. Peter Tork of The Monkees makes a guest appearance.
129	7	"So Long, Frank Lloyd Wrong"	Rick Beren	Howard Gewitz	November 21, 1995	15.8
Joe and Helen engage a famous architect to build their new home. Subplot: Brian must find out why Budd, Lowell's replacement, is having bad flashbacks of his days in the Marine Corps.
130	8	"When a Man Loves a Donut"	Leonard R. Garner Jr.	Jeffrey Richman & Joyce Gittlin	November 28, 1995	14.3
Brian feels left out now that Joe's married, so he starts to overeat. Subplots include Casey applying for a job as a tour guide and Antonio buying a valuable (and painful) pair of Italian leather shoes.
131	9	"The Big Sleep"	Jeff Melman	Michael Sardo	December 12, 1995	14.1
After fighting with Helen over the plans for the new house, Joe dreams that he and Helen are in a plane crash.
132	10	"Twas the Heist Before Christmas"	Jeff Melman	Ellen Byron & Lissa Kapstrom	December 19, 1995	19.1
Joe and Helen throw a Christmas party that everyone wants to leave, including Joe himself. Rebecca Schull does not appear in the episode.
133	11	"Honey, We Broke the Kid"	Jeff Melman	Lori Kirkland	January 2, 1996	15.8
While babysitting the daughter of a mutual friend, Joe and Helen each have their own way of parenting.
134	12	"B.S. I Love You"	Leonard R. Garner Jr.	Christopher Vane	January 9, 1996	17.7
Joe and Brian reunite with whom they think is their grandfather (Pat Hingle), but is actually an old roommate of their dad's from the mental hospital. Subplot: Antonio throws away a chain letter as superstitious garbage and bad fortune follows.
135	13	"Sons and Lovers"	Jeff Melman	Jeffrey Richman & Joyce Gittlin	January 16, 1996	16.7
Roy is celebrating his leap year birthday at a Chuck E. Cheese-style restaurant, and Helen invites his estranged gay son R.J., who has recently finished law school. Roy seems glad to see R.J., but R.J. does not mention he also brought along his boyfriend Luke (Tim Bagley). Meanwhile, Joe becomes frustrated in his attempts to win Helen a stuffed bear from the restaurant's Claw machine.
136	14	"Bye, George"	Jeff Melman	Jim McGoulf	January 30, 1996	16.7
Fay plans to marry a man she met on a cruise, until she finds out his is the same as her late husbands: George. Subplot: A bedridden Joe expects Helen to baby him.
137	15	"The Team Player"	Leonard R. Garner Jr.	Howard Gewirtz	February 6, 1996	16.0
When Antonio runs the ticket desk for Joe and Brian, a star from the Boston Bruins misses his flight due to being late and Antonio selling the player's seat to a woman with a standby ticket. This soon ruins Sandpiper's business reputation, even making its way into a Tonight Show joke (Jay Leno in a cameo). Rebecca Schull does not appear in the episode.
138	16	"Love at First Flight"	Darryl Bates	Michael Sardo	February 13, 1996	15.4
Brian falls in love with Melissa Williams (Ally Walker), a woman who's just about to get married. Roy acts like he is going out with Edna so that Antonio falls back in love with Edna.
139	17	"Lynch Party"	Jeff Melman	Ian Gurvitz & Mark Reisman	February 20, 1996	16.6
In flashbacks explaining the continuation of "Whose Wife is it Anyway", Helen shows that she never got the chance to inform Davis Lynch the wedding was off, as during the engagement party he was rushed off to Burma in wake of a military coup to salvage his major investments. Once there he had been taken hostage and only now is released, and is coming to Nantucket to marry Helen. She tries to find a way to end the engagement while doing so behind Joe's back. Rebecca Schull does not appear in the episode.
140	18	"One Flew Over the Cooper's Nest"	Jeff Melman	Ellen Byron & Lissa Kapstrom	February 27, 1996	16.9
Sandy Cooper (Valerie Mahaffey) is back in town and Joe tries, yet again, to prove to Helen just how nuts she is. But it is he who ends up in the psychologist's chair. Roy, Fay, Antonio and Casey fear that the tuna they had for lunch may be tainted.
141	19	"Driving Mr. DeCarlo"	Jeff Melman	Christopher Vane	March 12, 1996	16.7
Antonio starts driving around a man everyone thinks is connected to the mob.
142	20	"A Tale of Two Sister Cities"	Leonard R. Garner Jr.	Jeffrey Richman	March 26, 1996	14.5
Casey is in danger of losing her job, so she tries to create a sister city for Nantucket. Brian unknowingly slept with the wife of the leader of Kiranon. In a rare example where the subplot collides with the main plot, Joe is becoming increasingly angry with other men who pay attention to Helen.
143	21	"What About Larry?"	Jeff Melman	Mark Reisman and Michael Sardo	April 9, 1996	13.7
Joe and Helen's new contractor ends up crashing at their house after his wife leaves him. George Kennedy guest stars as himself.
144	22	"The Lady Vanishes"	Jeff Melman	Ian Gurvitz and Michael Sardo	April 23, 1996	18.6
Antonio goes on a quest looking for this woman he met in the terminal. Anne Francis guest stars as Vera.
145	23	"Life Could Be a Dream"	Jeff Melman	Lori Kirkland	April 30, 1996	15.5
When the gang opens up a time capsule they buried 20 years ago, they imagine what their lives would've been like.
146	24	"The Lyin' King"	Jeff Melman	Christopher Vane	May 7, 1996	15.1
Joe feels awful about lying to Helen about going to help out at an old age home, when he's actually going to see an old girlfriend at a strip club.
147	25	"Love Overboard"	Leonard R. Garner Jr.	Ellen Byron & Lissa Kapstrom	May 14, 1996	15.0
Casey's ex-husband Stuart (John Ritter) shows up with news that he is bankrupt. Roy teaches Antonio how to dance, and they enter a contest on a cruise ship.
148	26	"Grouses, Houses, and Bickering Spouses"	Jeff Melman	Jeffrey Richman & Lori Kirkland	May 21, 1996	15.0
While celebrating moving into their new house, Joe and Helen accidentally burn Brian's house down.

=== Season 8 (1996–97) ===
No. overall	No. in season	Title	Directed by	Written by	Original release date	US viewers (millions)
149	1	"Porno for Pyros"	Jeff Melman	Ian Gurvitz	September 18, 1996	10.7
Joe and Helen burn Brian's house down and he expects to get a big check like they did. But the insurance investigator thinks Joe, Helen, Brian and Casey are conspiring to commit insurance fraud. Antonio manages to woo the woman and get a room at the Century Inn, where she leaves an unextinguished cigarette lying around.
150	2	"Like a Neighbor Scorned"	Jeff Melman	Howard Gewirtz	September 25, 1996	10.4
When Joe and Helen meet their new neighbors Steve and Barbara, they think they are great at first until Steve asks Joe to bail him out of $5,000 of gambling debts and Barbara bluntly accuses Helen of sleeping with Steve. Now scared of these two, Joe and Helen must find a way to avoid them, even going so far as to break into their own dark house. Subplot: Antonio receives his recently deceased Uncle Bernardo's personal belongings, which include perfumed love letters written to Gina Lollobrigida.
151	3	"Maybe It's You"	Leonard R. Garner Jr.	Mark Reisman	October 2, 1996	11.1
Brian's vow to find a meaningful relationship is tested when he meets a beautiful but annoying woman named Dani (Jenny McCarthy).
152	4	"Single and Hating It"	Leonard R. Garner Jr.	Ellen Byron & Lissa Kapstrom	October 9, 1996	9.6
While a storm rages outside, Joe and Helen stop by a singles mixer to drop off Brian's wallet and end up stuck there for their first anniversary.
153	5	"Too Beautiful for You"	Joyce Gittlin	Lori Kirkland	October 23, 1996	10.9
Antonio mans the suicide hotline and makes a date with a woman who calls. Subplot: Helen loses customers when a new food cart arrives at the airport.
154	6	"The Gift of Life"	Leonard R. Garner Jr.	Michael Sardo	October 30, 1996	11.6
On Halloween, the gang convinces a man who is separated from his wife to stop being so focused on work and spend time with her. Little do they realize that he is a medical courier, and he left a cooler with one of his deliveries at the airport.
155	7	"Olive or Twist"	Jeff Melman	Jeffrey Richman	November 6, 1996	10.9
Casey suggests that Brian uses his insurance check to open a martini bar with her as the manager. However, when a customer (Stuttering John) suffers an accident on Brian's property, Casey says she neglected to have Brian's bar insured.
156	8	"Wingless"	Darryl Bates (Part 1) Jeff Melman (Part 2 & 3)	Christopher Vane	November 13, 1996	10.3
157	9	"Wingless"	Darryl Bates (Part 1) Jeff Melman (Part 2 & 3)	Ian Gurvitz	November 20, 1996	9.5
158	10	"Wingless"	Darryl Bates (Part 1) Jeff Melman (Part 2 & 3)	Lori Kirkland	December 11, 1996	9.6
Part 1: A financial crisis forces Joe to seek out an investor. When businessman Edgar Clayton comes to the island, Joe thinks it's his lucky day. But Clayton informs Joe he doesn't invest in businesses, he buys them. With no other choice, Joe sells. Joe and Brian are glad that with Clayton's backing they got their plane out of repossession and are up and running, until Clayton says now his slacker son Cord is the new president of Sandpiper. Part 2: The first act that new Sandpiper president Cord Clayton does is hold a meeting telling everyone they need a big idea. After learning that Roy cannot break into the market of charter flights, Cord proposes making Sandpiper an exclusive charter service, and has Joe and Brian fly a pair of bickering mother-daughter country music singers. When the tour fails, Cord tries fleeing, only for Joe and Helen to tell him he must be a man and face his father at a business meeting in New York. Part 3: Cord returns but becomes nervous during a presentation before his father's board of directors and leaves, leaving Joe and Brian to continue. Helen overhears one of Clayton's young hotshots saying that he recommended Cord for the presidency of Sandpiper in order for him to run Sandpiper into the ground, which Clayton could use as a tax write off. Clayton takes the news badly but, at Cord's behest, allows Joe to run Sandpiper to him and agrees to stay on as a silent investor.
159	11	"All About Christmas Eve"	Joyce Gittlin	Michael Sardo	December 18, 1996	9.7
Another odd Christmas hits Nantucket as Antonio drives a nun around the island who's in search of a vision she saw in a dream, Joe and Brian try to defuse a long-standing feud between two elderly brothers, and Fay, Helen and Casey get trapped in the basement of the department store where Casey works.
160	12	"Let's Talk about Sex"	Leonard R. Garner Jr.	Ellen Byron & Lissa Kapstrom	January 8, 1997	12.13
Roy falls in love with talk show host Mary Pat Lee (Caroline Aaron), but discovers she's using information he gave her to ambush Joe and Helen on her show. Subplot: Brian pays Casey to run errands for him.
161	13	"Hosed"	Leonard R. Garner Jr.	Story by : Christopher Vane and Art Baer & Ben Joelson; Teleplay by : Christopher Vane	January 15, 1997	12.03
Joe and Helen deal with a crooked vacuum cleaner salesman who charges them for a vacuum cleaner that had an eternal guarantee. Subplot: Brian comes up with a scheme to date Roy's niece.
162	14	"Just Call Me Angel"	Jeff Melman	Christopher Vane and Lori Kirkland	February 5, 1997	9.79
Joe and Brian return home after vacationing in Las Vegas, during which Joe gets food poisoning after eating at a cheap casino breakfast buffet. When the flight's pilots also get food poisoning, Brian lands the plane safely and is hailed by the media as the "Angel of Flight 28". Brian's newfound fame is taking up all his time and overloading Joe at Sandpiper. Cameo appearance by Steve Young playing himself as one of Flight 28's passengers.
163	15	"Fay There, Georgy Girl"	Jeff Melman	Ken Keeler	February 12, 1997	8.65
Fay holds a yard sale to help clear all of the clutter from her house. After selling goods that belonged to her three late husbands, Fay begins to be visited by their ghosts. However, Fay is also asked out by a man she met at the yard sale who tells her he values the memories of his relatives more so than the gifts they gave him.
164	16	"Escape from New York"	Jeff Melman	Jeffrey Richman	February 19, 1997	9.35
Brian and Helen go to New York to see the Broadway musical Rent, but their trip turns into a nightmare when Helen loses all her money in a card game. Cameo appearance by Calvert DeForest. Rebecca Schull does not appear in the episode.
165	17	"House of Blues"	Jeff Melman	Jeffrey Richman	March 5, 1997	10.41
Brian and Casey are kicked out of Joe and Helen's place, so they rent a house of their own with help from Antonio as they know he's spending all his time at his new girlfriend's house and won't be there. When Antonio and his girlfriend break up, however, they find themselves all living together. Subplot: Helen and Joe are blackmailed by some teenagers who have pictures of them doing various things around their house in the nude. Guest Starring Sibel Ergener.
166	18	"Ms. Write"	Leonard R. Garner Jr.	Ellen Byron & Lissa Kapstrom	March 19, 1997	9.46
Brian falls for someone after reading love letters mistakenly sent to the old occupant of the house. Antonio installs a home security system for Joe and Helen.
167	19	"Dreamgirl"	Leonard R. Garner Jr.	Michael Sardo	April 2, 1997	9.48
With Fay on vacation, Joe and Brian hire a beautiful woman to fill in. Subplot: Casey gets Antonio a job at the department store where she works.
168	20	"Heartache Tonight"	Leonard R. Garner Jr.	Lori Kirkland	April 16, 1997	10.32
Roy invites Joe and Helen over to his house to meet his mother (Rose Marie) and tells her that Helen is his girlfriend and Joe's the help. Subplot: Casey catches Brian's cold before a date.
169	21	"Oedipus Wrecks"	Darryl Bates	Ellen Byron & Lissa Kapstrom	May 7, 1997	8.25
Brian's surprised to find out his girlfriend Emily Palmer (Shannon Tweed), has son is in college, named Shawn (Christopher Wiehl). Further complications happen when Casey starts dating Shawn. Joe and Roy try to overcome a fear of the circus. Rebecca Schull does not appear in the episode.
170	22	"Raging Bull*&@!"	Jeff Melman	Christopher Vane	May 14, 1997	7.46
Joe enters a boxing tournament to beat an old rival. Things turn unusual when the rival is injured and the replacement contender turns out to be Brian.
171	23	"Final Approach"	Leonard R. Garner Jr.	Michael Sordo	May 21, 1997	14.23
172	24	"Final Approach"	Jeff Melman	Ian Gurvitz	May 21, 1997	14.23
To cheer up Helen, Joe restores her cello. While she rediscovers her passion for music, the rest of the gang hunts for money that Joe and Brian's father left them. They eventually find it and now have $250,000. Joe and Brian each have different plans for the money; Joe wants to expand Sandpiper while Brian wants to leave Nantucket. In the end, Joe and Helen move to Vienna for a year so that Helen can study cello with a famous conductor, while Brian agrees to run Sandpiper while Joe is away. Fay will continue on at Sandpiper (and is given a small ownership stake as a reward for her dedicated service), and it's strongly implied that Casey will run the lunch counter in Helen's absence.

== Home releases ==
All eight seasons of this series have been released on DVD.

DVD set	Episodes	Company	Release date
Wings: Seasons 1 & 2	28	Paramount Home Video	May 23, 2006
Wings: The Complete 3rd Season	22	Paramount Home Video	October 24, 2006
Wings: The Complete 4th Season	22	Paramount Home Video	May 15, 2007
Wings: The Complete 5th Season	24	Paramount Home Video	November 6, 2007
Wings: The Complete 6th Season	26	Paramount Home Video	March 25, 2008
Wings: The Complete 7th Season	26	Paramount Home Video	September 9, 2008
Wings: The 8th and Final Season	24	Paramount Home Video	April 14, 2009
Wings: The Complete Seasons 1 & 2	28	Mill Creek Entertainment	October 1, 2013
Wings: The Complete Seasons 3 & 4	44	Mill Creek Entertainment	January 21, 2014
Wings: The Complete Series	172	Mill Creek Entertainment	November 11, 2014
