= Once More with Feeling (film) =

2009 film by Jeff Lipsky

- Directed by: Jeff Lipsky
- Written by: Gina O'Brien
- Produced by: Nick Huston; Paul Jarrett
- Starring: Chazz Palminteri; Drea de Matteo; Linda Fiorentino
- Cinematography: Ruben O'Malley
- Music by: Paul Hsu
- Release date: 2009
- Country: United States
- Language: English

Once More with Feeling is a 2009 American independent direct-to-video comedy-drama film written by Gina O'Brien and directed by Jeff Lipsky and starring Chazz Palminteri, Drea de Matteo and Linda Fiorentino in her final film role to date as of 2026.

== Plot summary ==
A man pursues his old dream of becoming a singer by performing karaoke.

== Cast ==
- Chazz Palminteri as Frank Gregorio
- Drea de Matteo as Lana Gregorio
- Linda Fiorentino as Lydia
- Lauren Bittner as Susan
- Maria Tucci as Angelina Gregorio
- Daisy Tahan as Chloe
- Gene Ruffini as Nonno
- David Aaron Baker as Rich
- Ezra Barnes as Plastic Surgeon
- Chris Beetem as Officer Murphy
- David Call as Kevin
- Angelica Boccella as Nancy
- Venida Evans as Lucille
- Steven Maglio as Joey Garone
