= Handgun (disambiguation) =

A handgun is a firearm designed to be usable with only one hand. It may also refer to:

- Handgun (film), the 1983 vigilante film
- "Handgun", the song by DaBaby on the 2020 album My Brother's Keeper (Long Live G)
- "Handgun", the song by YG on the 2018 album Stay Dangerous
- Handguns (band), an American pop punk band
