= Childhood's End (disambiguation) =

Childhood's End is a 1953 science fiction novel by Arthur C. Clarke.

Childhood's End or Child Hood's End may also refer to:

== Western media ==
- Childhood's End (miniseries), a 2015 Syfy TV miniseries adapting the Clarke novel
- Childhood's End (film), a 1997 feature film starring Reiko Aylesworth
- "Childhood's End" (Stargate Atlantis), a 2004 episode of the science fiction TV series

== Japanese media ==
- "The Children's Night" or "Child Hood's End", a 2002 episode of the RahXephon anime television series
- Gurren Lagann the Movie –Childhood's End- a September 2008 film
- "Childhood’s end", an episode of the 2023 Netflix series Gamera Rebirth

== Music ==
- Childhood's End (album), a 2012 music album by the Norwegian band, Ulver

=== Songs ===
- "Childhood's End" (Pink Floyd song), on the 1972 album, Obscured by Clouds
- "Childhood's End" on Carnival of Souls: The Final Sessions, a 1997 album by US hard rock band, Kiss
- "Childhood's End" on Fear of the Dark a 1992 album by British heavy metal band, Iron Maiden
- "Childhoods End?" on Misplaced Childhood, a 1985 album by progressive rock band, Marillion
