= One child =

One child may refer to:

- One Child, a 1980 American memoir
- "One Child" (Mariah Carey song), a 2010 Christmas song
- "One Child" (Savatage song), a 1996 heavy metal song
- One-child policy, the population control policy of the People's Republic of China
- OneChild, a Canadian-based, non-governmental organization
- One Child (TV series), a 2016 TV series
