= Goldilocks and the Two Bears =

- Directed by: Jeff Lipsky
- Written by: Jeff Lipsky
- Produced by: Nick Athas
- Starring: Claire Milligan; Bryan Mittelstadt; Serra Naiman
- Cinematography: Zak Ray
- Release date: July 5, 2024 (Quad Cinema)
- Country: United States
- Language: English

Goldilocks and the Two Bears is a 2024 American drama film written and directed by Jeff Lipsky and starring Claire Milligan, Bryan Mittelstadt and Serra Naiman.

== Cast ==
- Claire Milligan
- Bryan Mittelstadt
- Serra Naiman

== Production ==
In October 2022, it was announced that production concluded. The film was shot entirely in and around Las Vegas.

== Release ==
The film was released in the Quad Cinema in New York City on July 5, 2024.

== Reception ==
Sheila O’Malley of RogerEbert.com awarded the film half a star.
