= Elective mutism =

Outdated term defined as refusal to speak

Elective mutism is an outdated term which was defined as a refusal to speak in almost all social situations (despite normal ability to do so), while selective mutism was considered to be a failure to speak in specific situations and is strongly associated with social anxiety disorder. In contrast to selective mutism, it was thought someone who was electively mute might not speak in any situation, as is usually shown in books and films. Elective mutism was often attributed to defiance or the effect of trauma. Those who are able to speak freely in some situations but not in others are better described with selective mutism.

== History ==
In 1877, a German physician named the disorder aphasia voluntaria to describe children who were able to speak normally but often "refused" to.

In 1980, a study by Torey Hayden identified four "subtypes" of Elective Mutism:

- Symbiotic mutism: the most common of the forms, caused by a vocal and dominating mother and absent father (very rarely the other way around) and characterized by the use of mutism as controlling behavior around other adults.
- Speech phobic mutism: the least common, in which the child showed distinct fear at hearing a recording of their voice. This also involved ritualistic behaviors, which may reflect obsessive-compulsive disorder (OCD), and was thought to be caused by the child having been told to keep a family secret.
- Reactive mutism: a reaction to trauma and/or abuse, with all children showing symptoms of depression and being notably withdrawn, usually showing no facial expressions. Notably, Hayden admits that some children put in this category had no apparent incident to react to, but they were included because of their symptoms.
- Passive-aggressive mutism: silence is used as a display of hostility, connected to anti-social behavior. Some of the children in her study had reportedly not been mute until age 9–12.

The Diagnostic and Statistical Manual of Mental Disorders (DSM), first published in 1952, first included Elective Mutism in its third edition, published in 1980. Elective mutism was described as "a continuous refusal to speak in almost all social situations" despite normal ability to speak. While "excessive shyness" and other anxiety-related traits were listed as associated features, predisposing factors included "maternal overprotection", intellectual disability, and trauma. Elective mutism in the third edition revised (DSM III-R) is described similarly as in the third edition except for specifying that the disorder is not related to social anxiety disorder.

In 1994, the fourth edition of the DSM reflected the name change to selective mutism and redefined the disorder.

== Cultural references ==
Though elective mutism is no longer recognized by most psychiatrists, it is a popular character element or plot point in stories and movies. Many characters choose to stop speaking, for various reasons. Even more commonly, there are also characters who stop speaking after a traumatic incident. In both these cases, often, and almost always in the second, the character is silent in all situations. This is therefore not selective mutism, and anxiety is very rarely involved. Selective mutism itself is almost nonexistent in pop culture.
