= Jackrabbit (film) =

- Directed by: Carleton Ranney
- Written by: Carleton Ranney; Destin Douglas
- Produced by: Rebecca Rose Perkins; Destin Douglas; Joe Stankus
- Starring: Josh Caras; Ian Christopher Noel; Joslyn Jensen; Reed Birney
- Cinematography: Ashley Connor
- Edited by: Joe Stankus; Talia Barrett
- Music by: Will Berman
- Production company: Vopo Technologies
- Release date: April 2015 (TFF)
- Running time: 101 minutes
- Country: United States
- Language: English

Jack Rabbit is a 2015 American cyberpunk film directed by Carleton Ranney, who co-wrote it with Destin Douglas. Josh Caras and Ian Christopher Noel star as residents of a dystopian city who attempt to find details about the death of their mutual friend, a computer hacker. It premiered at the 2015 Tribeca Film Festival.

== Plot ==
Twenty-five years after an unspecified cataclysm known as "The Reset", tech company Vopo Technologies rebuilds society in City Six. Although Vopo has access to modern technology, which they use to maintain control, the people scavenge for 1980s-era parts. Simon, a computer technician, learns his best friend, Eric, has committed suicide. At the funeral, he observes Max. Max later sells scavenged computer parts to a shop where Simon works. Though Max brushes off Simon's attempts to make conversation, he later comes back to request aid in decoding an encrypted message Eric sent him. Max is disappointed to learn that Simon has quit his job to work for Vopo, as he believes Vopo to be untrustworthy.

Simon easily accesses Eric's message. After watching cryptic video footage together, Max kicks out Simon to further research the matter alone. Simon returns the next day and insists Max allow him to help, pointing out that his Vopo contacts could prove useful. Max agrees, and they leave the city to visit the house of a woman seen in the footage, disguised as Vopo technicians. The woman knows nothing, but in her house, Max and Simon find clues that lead them to a fellow computer hacker, Steven, who was working with Eric. Overhearing from a Vopo security officer who has come to visit the house that Steven has died, they contact his girlfriend's sister, Grace, who works at a hospital.

Grace explains she has been searching for her missing sister. She leads them to a safe house said to be frequented by anti-Vopo hackers, though they find little information. When a curfew passes, they hide from a Vopo patrol and crash at Grace's house. There, the three get to know each other better. Simon says he drifted apart from Eric once Eric began hanging out with computer hackers who opposed Vopo, and Max reveals that he met Eric at a juvenile detention center, where Eric taught him how to hack computers. The others press Max to play a tape, which they believe to be music; instead, it is a recording of his mother, who Max believes was killed by Vopo. Simon dances with Grace, eventually telling her that Steven has died. After they leave Grace's house, they see a man kill her.

Though shaken, they continue their investigation. At work, Paul Bateson, the co-founder of Vopo, speaks to Simon. He says he knows of Simon and Max's investigation, saying Simon reminds him of himself and his idealistic partner, Tom, a talented computer hacker who, for reasons left unexplained by Bateson, is no longer with Vopo. Urged by an anonymous computer hacker, Max and Simon uncover a hidden message left by Tom in which he expresses regret with how Vopo and the city have turned out, inviting anyone who can decode his message to join him searching out other surviving cities. Later, while discussing this with Bateson, Bateson stresses the need for stability and safety over idealism. Bateson reasons that even if any other settlements existed – which he discounts – they would only raid City Six if they knew of its success.

Simon and Max leave the city, violating a curfew by bluffing their way through a guard post via Simon's Vopo credentials and hacking Vopo's computer surveillance. Outside the city, they find a wide desert. Overjoyed by their newfound freedom, Max encourages Simon to leave City Six with him. Simon reveals that he informed on Eric to save himself when Eric was sent to juvenile detention, and Max says he already knew this. Max repeats his offer, but Simon declines, saying he has chosen to ally himself with Vopo. He urges Max to flee from Vopo's security and says he will no longer be able to help him beyond this point. As a drone approaches, Simon watches Max flee.

== Cast ==
- Josh Caras as Simon
- Ian Christopher Noel as Max
- Joslyn Jensen as Grace
- Reed Birney as Paul Bateson

== Production ==
Writer-director Carleton Ranney was inspired by news stories about WikiLeaks and Aaron Swartz, a hacktivist who committed suicide. Although the film was shot in Austin, Texas, Ranney sought to keep the setting ambiguous. Ranney also kept details about the world itself ambiguous, including the nature of The Reset, as he felt it worked better as a mystery that not even the fictional world fully understood. Ranney cited David Cronenberg, Michael Mann, William Gibson, and films of the 1980s, including WarGames and the claustrophobic close-ups in Dekalog: One, as further inspirations. The film's themes address how technology can be used to both aid and hinder free access to information and make human connections. The film's outdated technology was sourced from a Goodwill computer museum.

== Release ==
Jackrabbit premiered at the Tribeca Film Festival in April 2015.

== Reception ==
John DeFore of The Hollywood Reporter called it a "moody and terse" film whose slow pacing and minimalist story will leave mainstream audiences uninterested. Maria Vultaggio of the International Business Times described it as "exciting in theory, but lacking in execution", criticizing its lack of substance.
