= Lauren Bittner =

American actress

- Years active: 2004–present

Lauren Bittner is an American actress.

== Life and career ==
Bittner is best known for her role as Julie in Paranormal Activity 3. Bittner has also appeared in The Thing About My Folks, Flannel Pajamas, Gardener of Eden, Bride Wars, The Mighty Macs, and Subject: I Love You.

Bittner was cast as a series regular on the Lifetime drama series Secret Lives of Wives, and in the Apple TV comedy-horror series Widow's Bay.

== Filmography ==
Year	Title	Role	Notes
2004	Third Watch	Amber	Episode: "Purgatory"
2005	The Thing About My Folks	Baseball Cutie	
2006	Nobody's Watching	Jill Nolan	TV pilot
2006	Flannel Pajamas	Amanda	
2006	Law & Order: Criminal Intent	Amanda Breen	Episode: "Wasichu"
2006	Lovebites	Katie	Episode: "One Night Stand"
2007	The Black Donnellys	Mary Ann Maxwell	2 episodes
2007	Gardener of Eden	Laura	
2007	Spellbound	Alex	TV pilot
2009	Bride Wars	Amie	
2009	Once More with Feeling	Susan	
2009	The Mighty Macs	Mary Margaret O'Malley	
2010	Worn	Emma	Short film
2011	Subject: I Love You	Rena	
2011	The Secret Lives of Wives	Jessie	TV movie
2011	Paranormal Activity 3	Julie	
2012	Blue Bloods	Alyssa Mulrow	Episode: "Risk and Reward"
2013–2014	Hart of Dixie	Vivian Wilkes	12 episodes
2014	Saint Janet	Rachel	
2016	Beauty & the Beast	Judy Toland	Episode: "Something's Gotta Give"
2017	The Handmaid		Short film
2018	Deception	Adi	Episode: "Black Art"
2020	Monsterland	Nancy Breaux	Episode: "New Orleans, LA"
2021	Unknown Dimension: The Story of Paranormal Activity	Herself	Documentary film
2026	Widow's Bay	Kris	2 episodes
