= Karen Young (actress) =

American actress (born 1958)

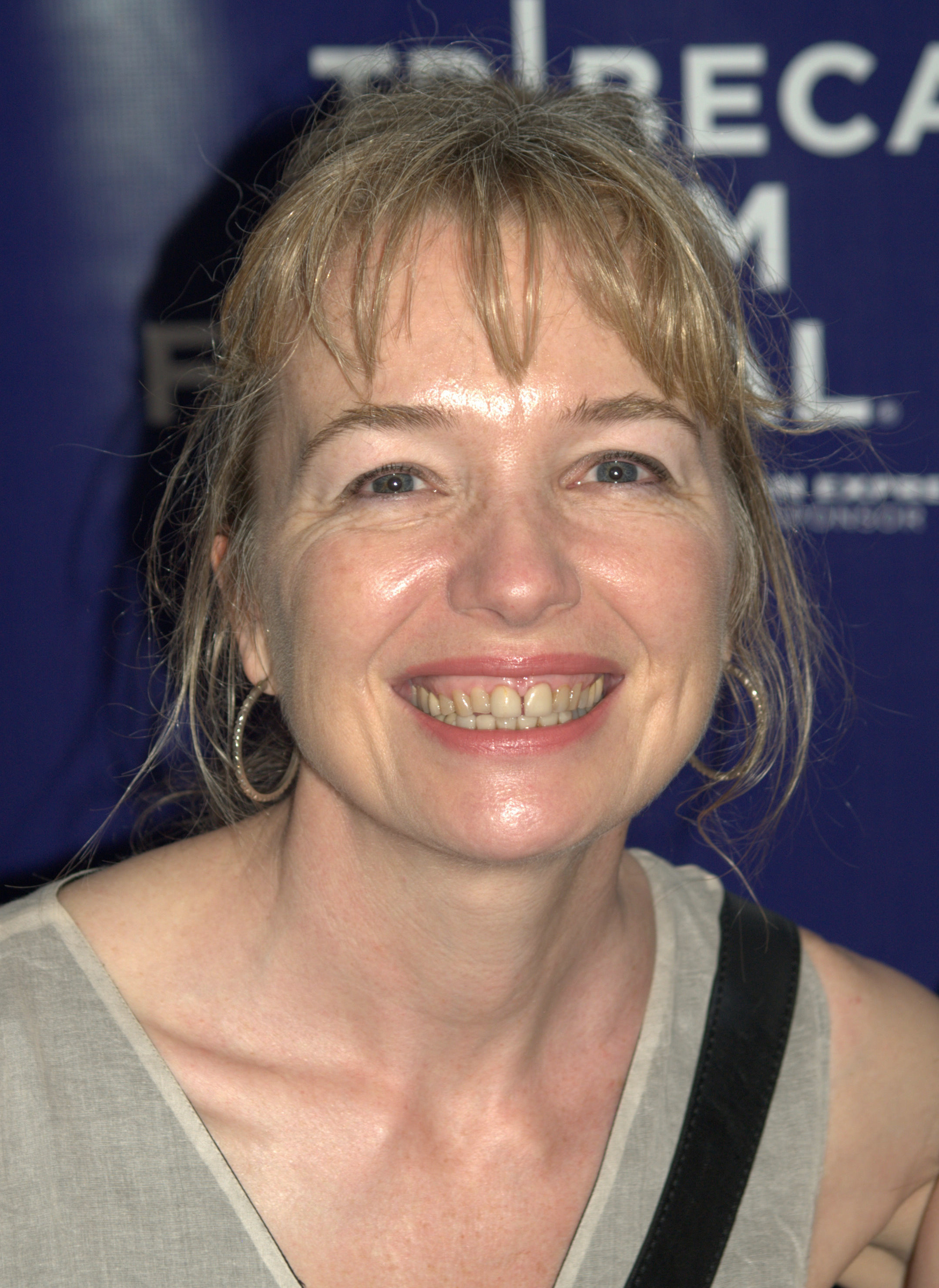
- Young at the 2009 Tribeca Film Festival
- Born: September 29, 1958 (age 67); Pequannock Township, New Jersey, U.S.
- Education: Rutgers University
- Occupation: Actress
- Years active: 1983–present
- Spouses: Tom Noonan (m. 1992; div. 1999); Ken Eisen (m. 2012)
- Children: 2

Karen Young (born September 29, 1958) is an American film, television, and stage actress.

== Early life and education ==
Young was born in Pequannock Township, New Jersey on September 29, 1958. She graduated from Douglass Residential College at Rutgers University as an English major.

== Career ==
After graduation, Young moved to New York City and became an actress. She was working as a waitress when she saw an advertisement in Backstage that read: "Wanted: 24-year-old Irish Catholic girl with long blonde hair." Young responded to the ad and made her screen debut starring in Tony Garnett's 1983 vigilante-thriller feature film Handgun, for which she had her hair cut off and in which she agreed to appear topless.

She also appeared in films such as 9½ Weeks, Heat (1986), Jaws: The Revenge, Torch Song Trilogy, Night Game, The Wife, Daylight and Mercy. Young portrayed Sister Mary in The Orphan Killer (2011), and starred in many U.S. independent and foreign films including Heading South, Two Gates of Sleep and Conviction.

Young made her television debut on The Equalizer in the 1985 season one episode "Lady Cop" as Officer Sandra Stahl, who doesn't want anything to do with dirty cops led by Stahl's new partner Officer Nick Braxton (Will Patton), and his partners-in-crime, Officer Frank Sergi (Bruce MacVittie), and Officer Miguel Canterra (Esai Morales). Young portrayed FBI Agent Robyn Sanseverino on The Sopranos as well as various characters in the Law & Order franchise.

Her stage credits include roles in both New York productions of Sam Shephard's A Lie of the Mind, playing daughter Sally in 1985 and mother Lorraine in Ethan Hawke's 2010 production. Young and the rest of the cast were recognized as some of the "best performers of 2010" by Hilton Als in The New Yorker.

== Personal life ==
Young married actor Tom Noonan in 1992, and they had two children together before their 1999 divorce. She married Ken Eisen in 2012.

== Filmography ==
=== Film ===
Year	Title	Role	Notes
1983	Handgun	Kathleen Sullivan	
1984	Maria's Lovers	Rosie	
1984	Almost You	Lisa Willoughby	
1984	Birdy	Hannah Rourke	
1985	Night Magic	Doubt	Voice
1986	9½ Weeks	Sue	
1986	Heat	Holly	
1987	Jaws: The Revenge	Carla Brody	
1988	Criminal Law	Ellen Faulkner	
1988	Torch Song Trilogy	Laurel	
1989	Little Sweetheart	Dorothea	
1989	Night Game	Roxy	
1991	The Boy Who Cried Bitch	Candice Love	
1992	Hoffa	Young Woman At RTA	
1995	The Wife	Arlie	
1996	Daylight	Sarah Crighton	
1998	Pants on Fire	Dierdre Grogan	
1999	Joe the King	Theresa Henry	
2000	Mercy	Mary	
2001	Falling Like This	Dolly	
2005	Factotum	Grace	
2005	Heading South	Brenda	
2008	Restless	Yolanda	
2008	Bonne année	Ellen	
2009	Handsome Harry	Muriel	
2010	Two Gates of Sleep	Bess	
2010	Twelve Thirty	Vivien	
2010	Conviction	Elizabeth Waters	
2011	The Green	Janette	
2011	Warrior Woman	Alice	
2011	The Orphan Killer	Sister Mary	
2012	The Sumo Wrestler	Kathy	

=== Television ===
Year	Title	Role	Notes
1985	The Equalizer	Officer Sandra Stahl	Episode: "Lady Cop"
1986	The High Price of Passion	Robin Benedict	Television film
1988	Wild Things	Jane	Television film
1991	The Summer My Father Grew Up	Chandelle	Television film
1991	The 10 Million Dollar Getaway	Theresa	Television film
1992	Drug Wars: The Cocaine Cartel	Faye Vaughan	2 episodes
1992	L.A. Law	Marcia Trafficante	Episode: "Silence of the Lambskins"
1996–2010	Law & Order	Various	4 episodes
1997	On the Edge of Innocence	Mrs. Victoria Tyler	Television film
2001	Third Watch	Shirley Holsclaw	Episode: "Man Enough"
2001	Law & Order: Criminal Intent	Denise Talbott	Episode: "Jones"
2002–2006	The Sopranos	FBI Agent Robyn Sanseverino	10 episodes
2004-2011	Law & Order: Special Victims Unit	Dr. Meg Whitmere / Christina Nerrit	3 episodes
2011	CSI: Miami	Diana Chandler	Episode: "F-T-F"
