= Molly's Theory of Relativity =

2013 American drama film

- Film poster
- Directed by: Jeff Lipsky
- Written by: Jeff Lipsky
- Produced by: Nick Athas; Inna Braude
- Starring: Sophia Takal, Lawrence Michael Levine
- Cinematography: Jendra Jarnagin
- Edited by: Patricia Burgess
- Release date: March 1, 2013 (New York City)
- Running time: 102 minutes
- Country: United States
- Language: English

Molly's Theory of Relativity is a 2013 American drama film written and directed by Jeff Lipsky and starring Sophia Takal.

== Plot Summary ==
A young astronomer (Sophia Takal) loses her job on Halloween. Along with her husband (Lawrence Michael Levine) who is trapped with two dead end jobs when he isn't engulfing her with a series of sexual trysts, she's on the verge of moving to Norway with him, thus making the first reckless decision of her life, all the while facing a slew of interruptions by neighbors and relatives.

== Cast ==
- Sophia Takal as Molly
- Lawrence Michael Levine as Zak
- Reed Birney as Asher
- Daisy Tahan as Ruby
- Cady Huffman as Natasha
- Rebecca Schull as Sylvie
- Adam LeFevre as Boris
- Tom Morrissey as Uncle Eli
- Nicholas Lampiasi as Chet

== Reception ==
The film has a 10% rating on Rotten Tomatoes, based on ten reviews with an average rating of 3.65/10. Time Out awarded the film one star out of five. Andrew Schenker of Slant Magazine awarded the film two stars out of four.
