= Alice Sluckin =

British social worker and psychologist (1919–2019)

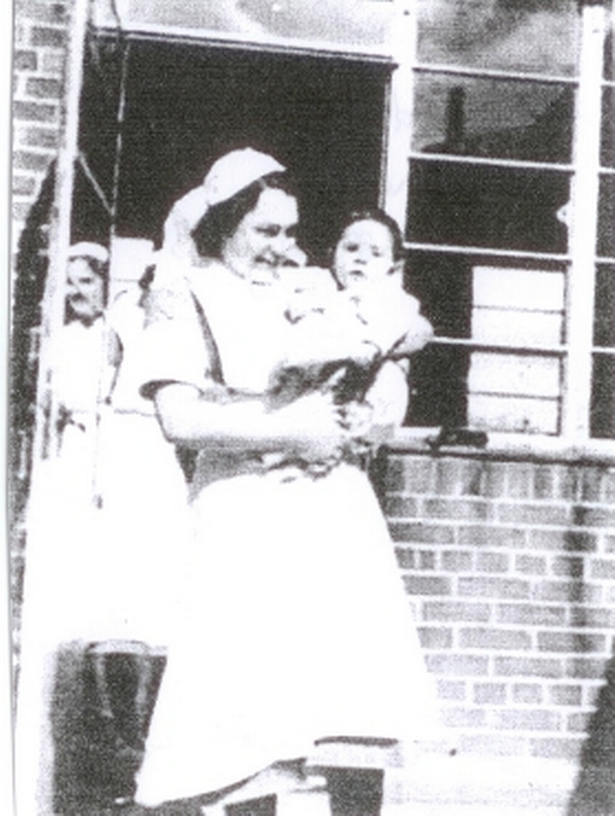
- Alice Sluckin in 1938
- Born: 21 July 1919; Prague, Czechoslovakia
- Died: 15 February 2019 (aged 99); United Kingdom
- Known for: Pioneer of research and treatment of selective mutism
- Awards: The Times/Sternberg Active Life Award
- Scientific career
- Fields: Social work, psychology

Alice Sluckin OBE (21 July 1919 – 15 February 2019) was a British social worker and psychologist.

== Biography ==
Alice was born in Prague to Mira and Otto Klaus. Her mother was Polish Jew and her father a German-speaking Jewish Czechoslovak. She grew up in the German-speaking province of Sudetenland. After the annexation of Sudetenland by the Nazis in 1938 as part of the Munich Agreement, Alice and her family fled to Prague and then, in February 1939, she arrived in Britain. Her family were killed during the Holocaust. Alice worked as a nurse in Southampton, but was forced to leave her position because she was regarded as an enemy alien. She moved to Cambridge and there met her future husband Wladek Sluckin, a Polish-Jewish engineering student. They married in 1942. During the war she worked as a billeting officer, rehoming people who had to be evacuated from their own.

Alice Sluckin studied for a diploma in social administration at Leeds University and then qualified as a psychiatric social worker from the London School of Economics in 1946. In 1964 Alice and her husband moved to Leicester. She was a Senior Psychiatric Social Worker at this time. She became interested in 'elective mutism' and became a pioneering figure in this field. She founded the Selective Mutism Information & Research Association (SMIRA) in 1992. She was a Fellow of the University of Leicester's Schools of Education and Psychology.

Whilst still serving as the Chair of SMIRA, Alice was awarded an OBE in the 2010 New Year Honours for services to children and families. In 2011 she was awarded The Times/Sternberg Active Life Award.

== Select publications ==
- Sluckin, W., Herbert, M., Sluckin, A., and Swildens, E. 1984. Moeder-kind-binding : mythe en realiteit. Rotterdam, Ad. Donker.
- Sluckin, A. 1989. "Behavioral Social Work Treatment of Childhood Nocturnal Enuresis", Behavior Modification 13 (4), 482–497.
- Sage, R. and Sluckin, A. 2004. Silent children : a step by step approach to better communication for children with selective mutism. Leicester, SMIRA.
- Smith, B. R. and Sluckin, A. (eds) 2015. Tackling selective mutism : a guide for professionals and parents. London, Jessica Kingsley Publishers.
