= Daisy Tahan =

American actress

- Born: March 25, 2001 (age 25); United States
- Occupation: Actress
- Years active: 2007–present
- Relatives: Charlie Tahan (brother)

Daisy Tahan (born March 25, 2001) is an American actress best known for her role as Samantha Focker in Little Fockers. Tahan also originated the role of Fiona Peyton in the Showtime series Nurse Jackie. Daisy, the younger sister of actor Charlie Tahan, lives in Glen Rock, New Jersey.

== Filmography ==
=== Film ===
Year	Title	Role	Notes
2007	Then She Found Me	Ruby	
2007	The Girl in the Park	Maggie	
2008	Synecdoche, New York	Ariel	
2009	Once More with Feeling	Chloe	
2009	Motherhood	Clara	
2009	The Other Woman	Emma	AKA Love and Other Impossible Pursuits
2010	13	Jenny Ferro	
2010	Little Fockers	Samantha Focker	
2010	Lulu at the Ace Hotel	Lulu	Short film
2013	Molly's Theory of Relativity	Ruby	
2013	Blood Ties	Robin Pierzynski	
2014	A Most Violent Year	Annie Morales	
2016	The Nice Guys	Jessica	
2018	The Kindergarten Teacher	Lainie Spinelli	

=== Television ===
Year	Title	Role	Notes
2009	Law & Order: Special Victims Unit	Rosie Rinaldi	"Snatched"
2009	Nurse Jackie	Fiona Peyton	Recurring role
2012	Royal Pains	April	"My Back to the Future"
2012	The Corrections	Young Denise	TV film
2013	House of Cards	Sarah Russo	Recurring role
2014	Blue Bloods	Stacy Goldman	"Open Secrets"
2014	Believe	Rachel	"Origin", "Perception"
