= Flannel Pajamas =

- Directed by: Jeff Lipsky
- Written by: Jeff Lipsky
- Produced by: Jonathan Gray
- Starring: Justin Kirk; Julianne Nicholson; Rebecca Schull; Jamie Harrold
- Cinematography: Martina Radwan
- Edited by: Sara Corrigan
- Music by: Paul Hsu
- Distributed by: Gigantic Pictures
- Release date: November 2006 (USA)
- Running time: 124 minutes
- Language: English
- Budget: US $470,000

Flannel Pajamas is a 2006 American drama film written and directed by Jeff Lipsky. It stars Justin Kirk and Julianne Nicholson. The plot charts the course of a short-lived marriage, from its passionate beginning through the daily erosion of feeling and romance to separation.

== Cast ==
- Justin Kirk as Stuart Sawyer
- Julianne Nicholson as Nicole Reilly
- Chelsea Altman as Tess
- Jamie Harrold as Jordan
- Rebecca Schull as Elizabeth
- Michelle Forbes as Tara
- Tom Bower as Bill
- Stephanie Roth Haberle as Megan
- George Riddle as Calvin
- Lauren Bittner as Amanda
- Stephanie March as Cathy
- Kirby Mitchell as Winston
- Tracy Sallows as Barbara
- Richard Robichaux as Marc
- Geoffrey Nauffts as Peter
- Jamie Harris as Brad
- Josh Elliot as Rabbi
- Walter Turney as Christopher
- Munro M. Bonnell as Jack Reilly
- Erin Davie as Sylvie (uncredited)
- Frank Deal as Gregory (uncredited)
- Rita Gardner as Gloria (uncredited)
- Elizabeth Martin as Dixie (uncredited)
- Mairead O'Neill as Baby Fiona (uncredited)
- Hilary Prentice as Denise (uncredited)
- Matt Walton as Dr. Butler (uncredited)

== Production ==
Filming took place in New York City, NY, Rockland County, NY, and Chester Springs, PA with a budget of just under $500,000.

== Release ==
It was shown at Sundance Film Festival, where it was nominated for a Grand Jury prize. It later opened in several large cities across the country, including New York City, where it received a mixed, though admiring, review from The New York Times, and San Francisco, where it received a similar review from the Chronicle.

=== Reception ===
Lipsky, the director, got his start as a distributor of independent films such as John Cassavetes' A Woman Under the Influence, and some reviewers noted Cassavetes' influence on this film. Entertainment Today and the New York Observer both picked it as one of the best films of the year. Roger Ebert called it "one of the wisest films I can remember about love and human intimacy. It is a film of integrity and truth, acted fearlessly, written and directed with quiet, implacable skill."
