= Mad Women =

- Poster
- Directed by: Jeff Lipsky
- Written by: Jeff Lipsky
- Produced by: Nikolai Metin
- Starring: Reed Birney
- Cinematography: Valentina Caniglia
- Edited by: Patricia Burgess
- Music by: XBOP
- Production company: Plainview Pictures
- Release date: July 10, 2015 (New York City)
- Running time: 130 minutes
- Country: United States
- Language: English

Mad Women is 2015 American drama film written and directed by Jeff Lipsky and starring Reed Birney.

== Cast ==
- Reed Birney as Richard
- Eli Percy as Otto
- Kelsey Lynn Stokes as Nevada
- Christina Starbuck as Harper
- Jamie Harrold as Anton
- Sharon Van Ivan as Julianne

== Release ==
The film was released theatrically in New York City on July 10, 2015, and in Los Angeles on July 24, 2015.

== Reception ==
The film has a 0 percent rating on Rotten Tomatoes based on 7 reviews.

Sheila O'Malley of RogerEbert.com awarded the film half a star and wrote, "The plot of Mad Women is ridiculous, unmotivated and "shocking," but that wouldn't be an issue at all if there had been some attempt at style, or mood, or a point of view."

The Hollywood Reporter gave the film a negative review, calling it "A mess of a family drama wrapped up in some never-credible politics and more misshapen monologues than you could find in a freshman play-writing course..."
