= Portia Reiners =

American actress (born 1990)

- Born: Portia Sullivan Reiners; March 8, 1990 (age 35)
- Occupation: Actress
- Years active: 1997–present

Portia Sullivan Reiners (born March 8, 1990) is an American actress. She has worked in theater, television, and film. Her television career includes the role of Britney Jennings on One Life to Live.

== Career ==
Reiners began her acting career in theater at age seven, appearing as Oliver in the musical Oliver!, and then was signed to the Abrams Artists Agency at age ten. She began her television career in 2000 as Lily Benton Montgomery in All My Children, then played Ada Dunne in As the World Turns in 2006 followed by Britney Jennings in One Life to Live from 2006 through 2007.

She continued in theater playing Annie in the musical Annie, Catherine in The Children's Hour, Baby June in the musical Gypsy, and then starring as Jenny Litnov in The Notebook at the McGinn-Cazale Theatre in New York City. In 2001, she played Kasia Gruszka in More Lies about Jerzy at the Vineyard Theatre in New York City.

She starred as Mel in the 2010 movie Twelve Thirty.

== Filmography ==
- All My Children (7 episodes, 2000–2006) .... Lily Benton Montgomery
- The Grey Zone (2001) .... Young Girl (voice)
- Iron Jawed Angels (2004) (TV movie) .... 14-year-old Jenny Leighton
- Law & Order: Criminal Intent (1 episode, "In the Wee Small Hours: Part 1", 2005) .... Nancy
- Law & Order (1 episode, "Great Satan", 2009) ....Jill Sorenson
- As the World Turns (13 episodes, 2006) .... Ada Dunne
- One Life to Live (47 episodes, 2006-2007) .... Britney Jennings
- Neal Cassady (2007) .... Cathy Cassady
- Twelve Thirty (2010)

== Personal life ==
Her mother was an actress. Reiners was named after the character Portia from Shakespeare's The Merchant of Venice.
