= The Wife (1995 film) =

Tom Noonan film

- Movie Poster
- Directed by: Tom Noonan
- Written by: Tom Noonan
- Produced by: Michael D. Aglion; Scott Macaulay; Robin O'Hara
- Starring: Tom Noonan; Wallace Shawn; Karen Young; Julie Hagerty
- Cinematography: Joe DeSalvo
- Edited by: Tom Noonan (as Richmond Arrley)
- Music by: Tom Noonan (as Ludovico Sorret)
- Distributed by: Artistic License
- Release date: August 16, 1995
- Running time: 119 min.
- Country: United States
- Language: English

The Wife is a 1995 American comedy-drama film written and directed by Tom Noonan, based on his play Wifey. The film was nominated for the Grand Jury Prize at the 1995 Sundance Film Festival, after Noonan had won the Grand Prize the previous year with What Happened Was.

== Plot ==
Jack and his wife Rita, both professional therapists, live and work in virtual isolation in a remote Vermont cottage. One night, one of Jack's patients, Cosmo, unexpectedly turns up with young wife Arlie in tow. And the more the couples talk and drink, the more tension builds over what personal issues are being shared in analysis, as well as the private troubles of the therapists themselves.

== Cast ==
- Tom Noonan as Jack
- Wallace Shawn as Cosmo
- Karen Young as Arlie
- Julie Hagerty as Rita
- Danny Darrow as The Tailor (uncredited)

== Critical reception ==
Stephen Holden of The New York Times gave the film a mixed review:

The Wife begins promisingly, but once Mr. Noonan's screenplay lurches into comic caricature, the movie loses its psychological authority... You are more inclined to laugh derisively at the characters than to sympathize with them... The detailed ensemble acting goes a long way toward covering up some of the screenplay's holes.
