= One Child =

Book by Torey Hayden

- First edition
- Author: Torey L. Hayden
- Language: English
- Subject: child psychopathology, child abuse
- Publisher: Putnam
- Publication date: 1980
- Publication place: United States
- ISBN: 978-0-399-12467-9
- Followed by: The Tiger's Child (1995)

One Child is a memoir by American author and psychologist Torey Hayden. It was first published in the United States in 1980, becoming a bestseller in the 2000s. The book has been translated into 27 languages and dramatized as an interactive opera. It was also loosely adapted as the 1994 Lifetime television film Untamed Love, starring Ashlee Lauren, Lois Foraker and Cathy Lee Crosby. The book has inspired people to move into Special Educational Need careers.

The book opens with Hayden, a special education teacher, reading a newspaper article about a six-year-old girl who had beat up and burned a three-year-old boy a couple of days prior. Since there was no place for her at the hospital, the girl, named Sheila, was placed in Hayden's class. Sheila had been abused and abandoned by her parents, and she rarely speaks. Over the subsequent five months in Hayden's class, Sheila gradually became more involved in classroom activities. Meanwhile, Hayden incrementally learned more about Sheila's background, which included horrific abuse from an uncle.

A sequel to this book, The Tiger's Child, was published in 1995.

== Summary ==
At the beginning of the year, Torey is given a long, narrow, carpeted classroom with a single window at the end – very inconvenient for a special education class. Her teaching assistant is a Mexican migrant worker named Anton who did not finish high school.

The students at the beginning of the year are as follows:

- Peter, 8, who has seizures and aggressive behavior caused by a neurological condition
- Tyler, 8, suicidal
- Max, 6, autistic
- Freddie, 7, obese and profoundly intellectually disabled
- Sarah, 7, angry, defiant and selectively mute because of physical and sexual abuse by her father
- Susannah Joy, 6, schizophrenic
- William, 9, OCD with phobias of water, darkness, cars, vacuum cleaners, and dust
- Guillermo, 9, blind, but he's in this class because the normal blind classes were unprepared to handle his aggressive behavior

At age four, Sheila's abusive then-eighteen-year-old mother left and took Sheila and two-year-old brother Jimmie with her; however, on the highway, Sheila's mother opened the door and pushed Sheila out, leaving her behind. Since then, Sheila has lived in poverty with her neglectful and verbally abusive father. When she joined Torey's class, Sheila's dad did not have enough money to get water to wash themselves or the one set of clothes Sheila owned. Thus, she came to school dirty and smelly every day.

Sheila is initially angry and has violent outbursts. These classic hallmarks of reactive attachment disorder are a result of her having been abused at home.

Sheila joins the group just after Christmas vacation. At first, she refuses to participate in class and refuses to speak to anyone. She stays sitting in one chair. On her first day of school, at lunch, Sheila takes all of the goldfish from the aquarium and stabs their eyes out with a pencil. Torey and Whitney, a shy fourteen-year-old girl who assists the class, chase Sheila into the gymnasium, and Torey eventually soothes the terrified girl into coming back to class.

After a few days, Sheila and Torey begin to trust one another, and Torey takes to giving her a bath every morning and massaging her body with baby lotion. Torey also shampoos Sheila's hair and styles it with kiddie barrettes, although Sheila fears that the pretty new hair decorations will be confiscated by her father.

After Sheila began participating in class, there were still a few issues. First, she was focused on revenge. At one point, a teacher scolded her in the lunch room, so she went into the teacher's room and caused $700 worth of damage to the classroom. Also, Sheila refuses to do paperwork. However, when given other media to work with (stacking blocks, for instance), she reveals that she is incredibly smart and talented for someone who only had a few months of first grade; her I.Q. is later tested and comes to a total of 182, which is, according to Torey, around 1 in 10,000 for a six-year-old. Sheila remains obsessed with showing people that she matters, and is terrified of abandonment.

At one point, Torey goes to California for a few days for a conference. The students were given plenty of notice, but Sheila interpreted it as abandonment by the one person who had shown her love and misbehaved throughout the whole trip.

In the middle of the year, Torey is notified that a space has opened up at the state hospital for Sheila. Torey is horrified and cries, seeing that this girl with all her improvement should not be put into an institution. Torey brings the case to court, with the help of Torey's then-boyfriend Chad, a lawyer, and wins. Afterward, Torey and Chad take Sheila out for pizza and buy her a dress.

One day, Sheila comes to school looking pale and poorly. She uses the bathroom twice in the first half-hour. Torey takes Sheila on her lap and then notices she's bleeding. Sheila eventually discloses that her uncle Jerry had tried to rape her, and when she was too small, he cut her genitalia with his knife. Sheila is rushed to the hospital after losing a lot of blood and has to have surgery to repair the damage. In the 1995 sequel, The Tiger's Child, it is revealed that because of this incident, Sheila is infertile. Sheila deals with the traumatic experience remarkably well, though she refuses to wear dresses for a while afterward.

At the end of the year, Torey introduces Sheila to the next year's teacher. Sheila will be going into third grade because Torey feels she can deal with the harder material and that it is more important at this point that Sheila's teacher be loving and understanding. Torey knows this teacher personally and knows she would be.

== Research and reception ==
The book has been used as the basis of research by Appalachian State University, by Michael Marlow & Gayle Disney.

Bookrags has provided a One Child Summary & Study Guide for educational purposes.

Reviewing the book for the Australian Journal of Human Communication Disorders, Mandy Brent concluded that "this book is an interesting but undeveloped narrative and is of limited use to the practising clinician" .

The book is used as a reference in the book Inquiry and Reflection: Framing Narrative Practice in Education by Diane DuBose Brunner.
