= Rebecca Schull =

American actress (born 1929)

- Born: February 22, 1929 (age 97); New York City, New York, U.S.
- Occupation: Actress
- Years active: 1976–present
- Spouse: Gene Schull (m. 1951; died 2008)
- Children: 3
- Relatives: Ben Wattenberg (brother); Daniel Wattenberg (nephew)

Rebecca Schull (née Wattenberg; born February 22, 1929) is an American actress, best known for her role as Fay Cochran in the NBC sitcom Wings (1990–1997).

== Life and career ==
Schull is the daughter of Rachel Gutman and real estate attorney Judah Wattenberg. She was the elder sister of the late writer Ben Wattenberg, and is journalist Daniel Wattenberg's aunt. She was married to Gene Schull, with whom she had three children, from 1951 until his death in 2008.

Schull studied acting in the United States and in Dublin, Ireland. She may be best known as Fay Cochran, the ticket agent for a one-plane Nantucket Island airline, on the long-running 1990s NBC sitcom Wings (1990–1997).

In 1977, Schull played Fefu in the premiere of Fefu and Her Friends off-broadway. She played the nursemaid in the 1976 Broadway play Herzl. Schull also has appeared in such films and television shows as Roseanne, Law & Order, Law & Order: Criminal Intent, United 93, Frasier, My Life, Analyze This, Analyze That, Flannel Pajamas, and Little Children. From 1982–83, she played Twyla Ralston on One Life to Live, and appeared on various other soap operas. She appeared regularly on USA Network's drama Suits from Season 1 to 5 until 2015, when her character died; she has since made appearances in flashback scenes.

Schull was a regular cast member on the ABC Family series Chasing Life, which ran from 2014 to 2015.

In 2016, Schull played Rose on the Amazon series Crisis in Six Scenes, written and directed by Woody Allen.

In 2019, Schull starred as Claire in the movie The Last, written and directed by Jeff Lipsky.

In 2022, Schull appeared opposite Kaley Cuoco and Pete Davidson in the movie Meet Cute.

== Filmography ==
Year	Title	Role	Notes
1980	A Private Battle	Anne Bardenhagen	TV movie
1981	Ryan's Hope	Nurse Dunphy	Recurring role
1982	The Soldier	Israeli Undersecretary of Agriculture	
1982–83	One Life to Live	Twyla Ralston	Recurring role
1985	Stone Pillow	Mrs. Nelson	TV movie
1986	Trapped in Silence	Marlys Mengies	TV movie
1988	Hooperman		Episode: "The Naked and the Dead"
1988	St. Elsewhere	Lavinia	Episode: "Their Town"
1988	Eisenhower and Lutz	Dodie	Episode: "Bud's Buddy"
1988	Newhart	Valerie	Episode: "Town Without Pity"
1989	Crimes and Misdemeanors	Chris' Mother	
1989	Roseanne	Miss English	Episode: "Sweet Dreams"
1990–97	Wings	Fay Evelyn Schlob Dumbly DeVay Cochran	Series regular, 172 episodes
1991	Guilty Until Proven Innocent	Beverly Rosen	TV movie
1993	My Life	Rose Ivanovich	
1994	Mortal Fear	Dr. Danforth	TV movie
1997	That Darn Cat	Ma	
1997	Holiday in Your Heart	Grandma Teeden	TV movie
1998	The Odd Couple II	Wanda	
1999	Analyze This	Dorothy Sobel	
2000	Frasier	Betty	Episode: "RDWRER"
2000	Law & Order	Mrs. Whitman	Episode: "Vaya Con Dios"
2002	Analyze That	Dorothy Sobel	
2004	Law & Order: Criminal Intent	Esther Gruenwald	Episode: "Unrequited"
2006	Flannel Pajamas	Elizabeth	
2006	United 93	Patricia Cushing	
2006	Little Children	Laurel	
2010	Damages	Virginia Fink	Episode: "Flight's at 11:08"
2010	Twelve Thirty	Katherine	
2011–13	Suits	Edith Ross	Recurring role, 9 episodes
2013	Molly's Theory of Relativity	Sylvie	
2014–15	Chasing Life	Emma	Recurring role, 22 episodes
2016	Crisis in Six Scenes	Rose	3 episodes
2019	The Last	Claire	
2022	Meet Cute	Gertrude	
