= Daniel Wattenberg =

American journalist and musician (born 1959)

Daniel Eli Wattenberg (born 1959) is an American journalist and musician. He was raised in Bethesda, Maryland. His father was the pundit Ben Wattenberg and his aunt is the actress Rebecca Schull. He received his BA degree from Columbia University in 1983.

== Biography ==
Wattenberg left his music career in 1983 to join the US State Department. He was first assigned to the embassy in Paris before being called back to Foggy Bottom to serve as a speechwriter for Elliott Abrams. After the Iran-Contra scandal, he left public service to work as a journalist. He joined the staff of The Washington Times, and became one of the founding staffers of its spinoff, Insight on the News.

In the early 1990s, he moved on to the magazine American Spectator where he collaborated with David Brock on a number of exposés of Bill and Hillary Clinton.

Wattenberg went on to work as a writer and editor for such magazines as The Weekly Standard and John F. Kennedy Jr.'s George. He also collaborated with his father, Ben Wattenberg, on a syndicated newspaper column. In the mid-2000s (decade), he returned to The Washington Times to serve as its arts editor.
