= Torey Hayden =

American special education teacher, university lecturer and writer

- Born: 21 May 1951 (age 75); Livingston, Montana, U.S.
- Education: Whitman College
- Known for: factual books about her experiences
- Scientific career
- Fields: autism, Tourette syndrome, sexual abuse, fetal alcohol syndrome, elective mutism, selective mutism

Victoria Lynn Hayden, known as Torey L. Hayden (born 21 May 1951 in Livingston, Montana, U.S.), is a special education teacher, university lecturer and writer of non-fiction books based on her real-life experiences with teaching and counseling children with special needs and also of fiction books.

Subjects covered in her books include autism, Tourette syndrome, sexual abuse, fetal alcohol syndrome, and elective mutism (now called selective mutism), her specialty.

== Biography ==
Hayden attended high school in Billings, Montana and graduated in 1969. She attended Whitman College in Walla Walla, Washington. She received a master's degree in special education from Montana State University Billings in 1975 and moved to University of Minnesota in Minneapolis for a doctorate in educational psychology. While there, she also worked with the Department of Child and Adolescent Psychiatry in the university hospitals.

Hayden moved to Wales in 1980. She is divorced and has a daughter.

In Wales Hayden has worked primarily with charities associated with child neglect and abuse, including Childline, the NSPCC, the Samaritans and the Citizens' Advice Bureau.

She has written five works of fiction in addition to her non-fiction books.

== Works ==
=== Non-fiction ===
- One Child (1980)
- Somebody Else’s Kids (1981)
- Murphy’s Boy (1983) / Silent Boy (British title for Murphy's Boy)
- Just Another Kid (1988)
- Ghost Girl (1991)
- The Tiger’s Child (1995)
- Beautiful Child (2002)
- Twilight Children (2005)
- Lost Child (2019)
- The Invisible Girl (2021)

=== Fiction ===
- The Sunflower Forest (1984)
- The Mechanical Cat (1998) / Overheard In A Dream (English title for The Mechanical Cat)
- The Very Worst Thing (2003)
- Innocent Foxes (2011) (In UK)
