= Jeff Lipsky (filmmaker) =

American film director

Jeff Lipsky (born October 10, 1953) is an American screenwriter and film director. He has written and directed such films as Flannel Pajamas (2006), Twelve Thirty (2011), Molly's Theory of Relativity (2013), Mad Women (2015) and The Last (2019). He is also one of the co-founders of the now-defunct film distribution studio October Films.

Lipsky grew up in Plainview, New York, and was raised as a Conservative Jew.

Lipsky admired John Cassavetes more than any other living American director and described him as his most important mentor. Later, Lipsky became the distributor of Cassavetes's independently produced film, A Woman Under the Influence.

In 2017, Lipsky launched the New York based distribution consulting firm Glass Half Full Media.

He was married to Maura Hoy.

== Filmography ==
| Year | Film | Director | Writer |
|---|---|---|---|
| 1996 | Childhood's End | Yes | Yes |
| 2006 | Flannel Pajamas | Yes | Yes |
| 2009 | Once More with Feeling | Yes | No |
| 2010 | Twelve Thirty | Yes | Yes |
| 2013 | Molly's Theory of Relativity | Yes | Yes |
| 2015 | Mad Women | Yes | Yes |
| 2019 | The Last | Yes | Yes |
| 2024 | Goldilocks and the Two Bears | Yes | Yes |
