= Two Gates of Sleep =

- Film poster
- Directed by: Alistair Banks Griffin
- Written by: Alistair Banks Griffin
- Produced by: Josh Mond; Andrew Renzi
- Starring: Brady Corbet; David Call; Karen Young
- Cinematography: Jody Lee Lipes
- Edited by: Alistair Banks Griffin; Brady Corbet
- Music by: Danny Bensi; Saunder Jurriaans
- Production company: BorderLine Films
- Release date: May 18, 2010 (Cannes)
- Running time: 78 minutes
- Country: United States
- Language: English

Two Gates of Sleep is a 2010 American drama film written and directed by Alistair Banks Griffin and starring Brady Corbet, David Call and Karen Young.

Two Gates of Sleep was produced by Josh Mond and Andrew Renzi through the production company Borderline Films. The film premiered at the 2010 Cannes Film Festival in the Director’s Fortnight selection, went on to win the 2011 New Talent Grand PIX at CPH:PIX and was distributed in the US by Factory 25.

== Plot ==
After preparing for their mother's imminent death, two brothers go on an arduous upriver journey to honor her final request.

== Cast ==
- Brady Corbet as Jack
- David Call as Louis
- Ross Francis as Hunter
- Ritchie Montgomery as Dr. Benjamin
- Lindsay Soileau as Dell
- Karen Young as Bess

== Reception ==
Robert Tumas of Slant Magazine awarded the film three stars out of four.

== Accolades ==
Awards
Award	Category	Recipient(s)	Outcome
Cannes Film Festival	Caméra d'Or	Alistair Banks Griffin	Nominated
Cannes Film Festival	C.I.C.A.E. Award	Alistair Banks Griffin	Nominated
CPH:PIX	New Talent Grand PIX	Alistair Banks Griffin	Won
BFI London Film Festival	Sutherland Trophy	Alistair Banks Griffin	Nominated
Deauville Film Festival	Grand Special Prize	Alistair Banks Griffin	Nominated
