= Reed Birney =

American actor (born 1954)

- Born: September 11, 1954 (age 72); Alexandria, Virginia, U.S.
- Education: Boston University
- Occupation: Actor
- Years active: 1976–present
- Spouse: Constance Shulman (m. 1999)
- Children: 2, including Gus Birney

Reed Birney (born September 11, 1954) is an American actor. Birney is known for his performances on stage and screen often acting on and off Broadway. Birney gained acclaim in 2016 for his role in The Humans winning the Tony Award for Best Featured Actor in a Play. He was also nominated previously in the same category for his performance in Casa Valentina in 2014.

He starred in the films Mass (2021) and The Menu (2022). He is also known for his recurring roles in Gossip Girl (2007–2009), House of Cards (2013–2017), The Blacklist (2014–2015), and Home Before Dark (2021–2022). He has also acted in The Americans, The Handmaid's Tale, and Succession.

== Career ==
Birney attended the Boston University College of Fine Arts for two years. After moving to New York City, he attended classes sponsored by the National Academy of Television Arts and Sciences.

Birney appeared off-Broadway at Playwrights Horizons in 1976 in Gemini by Albert Innaurato. He has appeared in many plays off-Broadway since, including Bug (2004) and Circle Mirror Transformation (2009).

He has performed on Broadway in Casa Valentina (2014) and The Humans. He appeared in the Annie Baker adaptation of Uncle Vanya at the Soho Rep in 2012. Charles Isherwood in his review for The New York Times wrote: "The indispensable Reed Birney is as vitally moving a Vanya as I’ve yet to see..." He was nominated for the Drama Desk Award, Outstanding Actor in a Play, for Uncle Vanya.

He won the 2016 Tony Award, Best Performance by an Actor in a Featured Role in a Play, for The Humans; the 2014 Drama Desk Award, Outstanding Featured Actor in a Play, for Casa Valentina; and the 2010 Obie Award, Performance, for Circle Mirror Transformation. He received a Special Drama Desk Award in 2011, honoring his career.

He appeared off-Broadway in the play by Tracy Letts, Man from Nebraska, which opened in January 2017 in previews at the Second Stage Theatre. From May to October 2017, he starred as O'Brien in the Broadway production of 1984 at the Hudson Theatre.

His television performances include Matthew Lester in Kane & Abel, Mr. Prescott on Gossip Girl, Donald Blythe on the Netflix series House of Cards, Tom Connolly in The Blacklist and Dr. Adamson on Titans. He also appeared in Hulu's adaptation of Margaret Atwood's The Handmaid's Tale as Lieutenant Stans.

His movie roles included Louie in Four Friends (1981), the Merchant Prince in A Perfect Murder (1998), Governor Willis in Morning Glory (2010), J. Whitman in The 40-Year-Old Version, Pa in The Hunt (both 2020), Peter Bloom in Strawberry Mansion, and Richard in Mass (both 2021).

Birney is an adjunct assistant professor at Columbia University.

== Personal life ==
He is married to actress Constance Shulman, who appears in Orange is the New Black, and they have two children together. Their daughter Gus Birney is also an actor, as is their son, Ephraim. Birney's nephew is filmmaker Albert Birney.

== Acting credits ==
=== Film ===
Year	Title	Role	Notes
1976	Not a Pretty Picture	Fred	Feature film debut
1981	Four Friends	Louie	
1985	Crimewave	Vic Ajax	
1998	A Perfect Murder	Merchant Prince #1	
2003	Uptown Girls	Executive	
2007	The Ten	Jim Stansel	
2008	Changeling	Mayor Cryer	
2010	Twelve Thirty	Martin	
2010	Morning Glory	Governor Willis	
2012	Girl Most Likely	Dr. Chalmers	
2013	Molly's Theory of Relativity	Asher	
2013	Adult World	Todd	
2014	In Your Eyes	Dr. Maynard	
2015	Jackrabbit	Paul Bateson	
2015	Mad Women	Richard	
2019	The Lost Weekend	Henry	Short film
2020	The Forty-Year-Old Version	J. Whitman	
2020	Lost Girls	Peter Hackett	
2020	The Hunt	Pop	
2021	Strawberry Mansion	Peter Bloom	
2021	Mass	Richard	
2022	Baby Ruby	Dr. Rosenbaum	
2022	The Menu	Richard Liebrandt	
2024	Horizon: An American Saga – Chapter 2	Henry Bennett	
2024	If You See Something	Ward	
2025	Blue Film	Hank	
TBA	The Steel Harp		Post-production
TBA	Outrage	Jake Gadling	Post-production

=== Television ===
Year	Title	Role	Notes
1979	Eight Is Enough	Steven	Episode: "Mary, He's Married"
1981	Nurse		Episode: "Margin for Error"
1983	3-2-1 Contact	Wenfield	Episode: "Flight: Flying Animals"
1985	Kane & Abel	Matthew Lester	2 episodes
1987	Beverly Hills Buntz	Larry Fielding	Episode: "Sid and Randy"
1990	Tales from the Crypt	Paul	Episode: "Mute Witness to Murder"
1992–2010	Law & Order	Various	3 episodes
1994	Another World	Walter Trask	3 episodes
1994	American Masters	Actor	Episode: "Tennessee Williams: Orpheus of the American Stage"
1998	From the Earth to the Moon	John Houbolt	Episode: "Spider"
2000	Law & Order: Special Victims Unit	Harry Waters	Episode: "Chat Room"
2002	The Education of Max Bickford	Todd	Episode: "Money Changes Everything"
2002	Ed	Mr. Walzer	Episode: "Human Nature"
2002–2005	Law & Order: Criminal Intent	A.D.A. Stillman / Fred Martz	2 episodes
2003	Queens Supreme		Episode: "The Eyes Have It"
2006	Kidnapped	Mancini	Episode: "Number One with a Bullet"
2007–2009	Gossip Girl	Mr. Prescott	4 episodes
2008	Wainy Days	Charlie Rose	Episode: "Jonah and the Manilow"
2009	Kings	Minister Forsythe	5 episodes
2010	My Generation	Michael Foster	2 episodes
2012	The Good Wife	Lee Tripke	Episode: "Battle of the Proxies"
2013–2017	House of Cards	Donald Blythe	17 episodes
2014	Blue Bloods	Burden Maxwell	Episode: "Manhattan Queens"
2014	Girls	Peter	Episode: "I Saw You"
2014–2015	The Blacklist	Tom Connolly	9 episodes
2015	American Odyssey	Senator Darnell	3 episodes
2017	Madam Secretary	Roland Hobbs	Episode: "Gift Horse"
2017	The Immortal Life of Henrietta Lacks	Dr. George Gey	Television film
2018	Chicago Med	Greg	Episode: "Best Laid Plans"
2018	The Americans	Patrick McCleesh	2 episodes
2018	Titans	Dr. Adamson	5 episodes
2019	A Million Little Things	Eugene Bloon	Episode: "The Day Before..."
2019	High Maintenance	Leonard	Episode: "Cruise"
2019	Bull	Judge Humphrey	Episode: "Imminent Danger"
2020–2021	Home Before Dark	Sylvester Lisko	18 episodes
2021	The Handmaid's Tale	Lieutenant Stans	Episode: "The Crossing"
2021	Evil	Father Thunderland	Episode: "I Is for IRS"
2021	Succession	Vice President Dave Boyer	Episode: "What It Takes"
2023	Poker Face	Gabriel/Ben	Episode "Time of the Monkey"
2023	Star Trek: Strange New Worlds	Luq	Episode: "Among the Lotus Eaters"
2024	American Horror Story: Delicate	Dexter Harding Sr.	4 episodes
2026–present	Silo	Henry	8 episodes
TBA	Rabbit, Rabbit		Upcoming series

=== Theatre ===
Year	Title	Role	Playwright	Venue	Ref.
1977	Gemini	Randy Hastings	Albert Innaurato	Little Theatre, Broadway	
2013	Picnic	Howard Bevans	William Inge	American Airlines Theatre, Broadway	
2014	Casa Valentina	Charlotte	Harvey Fierstein	Samuel J. Friedman Theatre, Broadway	
2016	The Humans	Erik Blake	Stephen Karam	Gerald Schoenfeld Theatre, Broadway	
2017	1984	O'Brien	Robert Icke	Hudson Theatre, Broadway	

== Awards and nominations ==
Year	Association	Category	Project	Result	Ref
2011	Drama Desk Award	Special Drama Desk Award		Won	
2014	Tony Award	Best Featured Actor in a Play	Casa Valentina	Nominated	
2014	Drama Desk Award	Outstanding Featured Actor in a Play	Casa Valentina	Won	
2014	Drama League Award	Distinguished Performance Award	Casa Valentina	Nominated	
2016	Tony Award	Best Featured Actor in a Play	The Humans	Won	
2016	Drama Desk Award	Outstanding Ensemble	The Humans	Won	
2016	Outer Critics Circle Award	Outstanding Actor in a Play	The Humans	Nominated	
2016	Drama League Award	Distinguished Performance Award	The Humans	Nominated	
2016	Long Island International Film Expo	Best Supporting Actor in a Short Film	Mired	Won	
2021	Gotham Award	Outstanding Supporting Performance	Mass	Nominated	
2021	Independent Spirit Award	Robert Altman Award	Mass	Nominated	
