= Handgun (film) =

1983 American vigilante thriller film

- Directed by: Tony Garnett
- Written by: Tony Garnett
- Starring: Karen Young; Clayton Day; Suzie Humphreys
- Music by: Mike Post
- Production company: Kestrel Films
- Distributed by: EMI Films
- Release date: May 12, 1983
- Running time: 101 minutes
- Country: United States
- Language: English

Handgun (also known as Deep in the Heart) is a 1983 American vigilante film starring Karen Young, Clayton Day, and Suzie Humphreys. It was written and directed by Tony Garnett.

== Synopsis ==
Kathleen Sullivan is a new teacher at a Texas high school. She meets local lawyer Larry Keeler, a gun enthusiast, who takes her out to dinner and then rapes her at gunpoint. Kathleen reports him to the police, who, though sympathetic, dissuade her from taking her case further. Kathleen seeks revenge.

== Cast ==
- Karen Young as Kathleen Sullivan
- Clayton Day as Larry Keeler
- Suzie Humphreys as Nancy

== Production ==
After a successful career in British television, Tony Garnett moved to the United States in 1980, wanting a new challenge. He was assisted in the move by a development deal from the Ladd Company. Garnett wanted to make a film about gun violence, inspired as he was by the murder of John Lennon. He went to Dallas, Texas, to research and write the film. The Ladd Company ultimately turned down the project, but Garnett succeeded in raising the budget (reported as $2.5 million—$3 million) from EMI Films.

Garnett found Karen Young in New York City, and the actors who played her parents in Boston. The rest of the cast were from Dallas. He used techniques he had developed in British drama, rehearsing and improvising with the actors for several months. "I didn't come here to make pat judgements about American culture", said Garnett. "I came to try to understand." Filming took place in 1981 in Dallas.

Karen Young said she was never given a script, and worked through improvisation. She called it "a personally gruelling experience but one I would not want to have missed. The rape scene took 14 hours to film in one day and it took me a long time to recover from it."

Garnett said EMI were "hands-off" until the final edit, but that changed once they saw the film. "The problem was that I had made a slow, thoughtful, and I hope considered character study, and they were expecting a commercial hit—an action movie with some sexy rape scenes. I hadn't delivered. Some of the distributors were disappointed as they considered the rape scenes a turn off and not sexy! I had to cut elements from the film that I now regret."

== Release ==
EMI Films had a loose arrangement with Universal for the latter to distribute its films, but Universal turned down Handgun.

Garnett sold the film to Warner Bros. instead of the Samuel Goldwyn Company, who had also expressed interest in it. He later said this was a mistake, claiming Warner "were producing a Clint Eastwood rape and revenge film. They didn't want the competition so they bought mine, sat on it, and opened it in a few theatres before pulling the film. It was a failure."

The Daily Telegraph said Young gave a performance of "exceptional emotional power". The Guardian praised Young's "brilliantly realistic performance". The Evening Standard called the film "a vengeance thriller with a refreshing, feminist slant and a surprising twist at the end". Los Angeles Times called it "a great deal more than an ordinary rape/revenge story and a lot of the credit goes to Karen Young's multilevel performance".
