= Childhood's End (film) =

- Directed by: Jeff Lipsky
- Written by: Jeff Lipsky
- Produced by: Jason Kliot; Joana Vicente
- Starring: Sam Trammell; Reiko Aylesworth
- Cinematography: Victoria Ford
- Edited by: Sabine Hoffman
- Production company: Open City
- Distributed by: Plainview Pictures
- Release date: August 25, 1996 (Montreal World Film Festival)
- Running time: 90 minutes 115 minutes
- Country: United States
- Language: English

Childhood's End is a 1996 American romantic comedy-drama film written and directed by Jeff Lipsky and featuring Sam Trammell and Reiko Aylesworth. It is Lipsky's feature directorial debut.

== Plot ==
Denise is displeased with Greg and has a relationship with another girl. Greg has his first sexual relationship with his friend's mother.

== Cast ==
- Cameron Foord as Evelyn Edwards
- Heather Gottlieb as Rebecca Meyer
- Colleen Werthmann as Denise Edwards
- Sam Trammell as Greg Chute
- Bridget White as Chloe Chute
- Reiko Aylesworth as Laurie Cannon
- Philip Coccioletti as Harvey Branch
- Ellen Tobie as Miranda Chute
- John Rothman as Bernard Chute
- Maureen Silliman as Mrs. Meyer

== Release ==
The film was released at the Montreal World Film Festival on August 25, 1996.

== Reception ==
Emanuel Levy of Variety gave the film a mixed review, calling it "mildly engaging but ultimately frustrating."

Stephen Holden of The New York Times gave the film a negative review and wrote that it "has the atmosphere of a tasteful upper-middle-class talk show, crammed with dialogue that is as dispassionate as it is savvy."
