= Twelve Thirty (film) =

- Directed by: Jeff Lipsky
- Written by: Jeff Lipsky
- Produced by: Dan Satorius
- Starring: Barbara Barrie; Reed Birney; Halley Feiffer; Jonathan Groff; Mamie Gummer; Portia Reiners; Rebecca Schull; Karen Young
- Cinematography: Ruben O’Malley
- Edited by: Sara Corrigan
- Music by: Paul Hsu
- Production company: Twelve-Thirty Prods.
- Distributed by: SenArt Films
- Release dates: October 2010 (Montreal); January 14, 2011 (Angelika Film Center)
- Running time: 121 minutes
- Country: United States
- Language: English

Twelve Thirty is a 2010 American drama film written and directed by Jeff Lipsky and starring Barbara Barrie, Reed Birney, Halley Feiffer, Jonathan Groff, Mamie Gummer, Portia Reiners, Rebecca Schull, and Karen Young. The film premiered at the 2010 Montreal World Film Festival.

== Premise ==
There are three women in the Langley household. Vivien (Karen Young), the mother, is caught between a fierce independence and an almost agoraphobic attachment to home. Seductive and confident Mel (Portia Reiners) is a 19 year-old mirror of her mother. Maura (Mamie Gummer), 22 year-old, is alienated afraid and unable to pinpoint her place in the world. They live together in a seemingly close household, yet each is very much alone. The family's status quo explodes when Jeff (Jonathan Groff) walks into their comfortable yet dysfunctional world. Bright, handsome, ambitious and sure of his future at the age of 22, he's also socially awkward and a sexual novice who's been infatuated with Mel since high school. When they begin working together at the same restaurant, he jumps at the opportunity to finally start a romance with the free-spirited girl. But Mel has other ideas about their time together.

== Cast ==
- Mamie Gummer as Maura
- Jonathan Groff as Jeff
- Portia Reiners as Mel
- Karen Young as Vivien
- Reed Birney as Martin
- Barbara Barrie as Eve
- Halley Feiffer as Irina
- Rebecca Schull as Katherine
- Kirby Mitchell as Mr. Levinson
- Fred Berman as Chris
- Dan Gill as Irina's Boyfriend (uncredited)

== Release ==
The film premiered at the 2010 Montreal World Film Festival. It later showed at the Angelika Film Center on January 14, 2011.

== Reception ==
The film has a 17% rating on Rotten Tomatoes based on 12 reviews. Eric Kohn of IndieWire graded the film a C+.

Roger Ebert awarded the film two and a half stars and wrote, "It doesn't work but I doubt you'll regret seeing it."

Steven Rea of The Philadelphia Inquirer awarded the film one and a half stars out of four and wrote, "Reiners and Gummer have respective moments where their talents shine, but there's not enough here to keep any but the most masochistic even moderately interested."
