= Paul Hsu (sound designer) =

American sound designer, re-recording mixer and supervising sound editor

- Born: U.S.
- Occupations: sound designer, Re-recording mixer, Supervising sound editor
- Years active: 1995–present

Paul Hsu is an American sound designer, re-recording mixer and supervising sound editor. He has won one Primetime Emmy Award from three nominations.

== Career ==
Paul was invited to become a member of Academy of Motion Picture Arts and Sciences in 2016. He is a principal partner at c5 sound, inc. in New York City.

== Selected filmography ==
- 2023 – Beau Is Afraid (supervising sound editor and re-recording mixer)
- 2022 – Jeen-Yuhs (re-recording mixer)
- 2022 – Nanny (sound designer)
- 2021 – Tick, Tick... Boom! (supervising sound editor and re-recording mixer)
- 2021 – Respect (re-recording mixer)
- 2021 – Stillwater (supervising sound editor and re-recording mixer)
- 2021 – Summer of Soul (re-recording mixer)
- 2020 – American Utopia (re-recording mixer)
- 2020 – Da 5 Bloods (re-recording mixer)
- 2019 – Motherless Brooklyn (supervising sound editor and re-recording mixer)
- 2017-2019 – She's Gotta Have It (supervising sound editor and re-recording mixer)
- 2018 – Ocean's 8 (supervising sound editor)
- 2017 – Lady Bird (supervising sound editor and re-recording mixer)
- 2017 – A Night at the Garden (supervising sound editor and re-recording mixer)
- 2017 – American Made (sound designer)
- 2017 – The Meyerowitz Stories (supervising sound editor and re-recording mixer)
- 2016 – Free State of Jones (supervising sound editor and re-recording mixer)
- 2015 – Chi-Raq (re-recording mixer)
- 2015 – Creative Control (re-recording mixer)
- 2014 – While We're Young (supervising sound editor and re-recording mixer)
- 2014 – Foxcatcher (supervising sound editor and re-recording mixer)
- 2013 – Cutie and the Boxer (supervising sound editor)
- 2012 – Frances Ha (supervising sound editor and re-recording mixer)
- 2011 – Win Win (supervising sound editor and re-recording mixer)
- 2010 – Salt (supervising sound editor)
- 2010 – Bill Cunningham New York (re-recording mixer)
- 2010 – Greenberg (supervising sound editor and re-recording mixer)
- 2009 – Away We Go (supervising sound editor and re-recording mixer)
- 2009 – Fighting (supervising sound editor)
- 2008 – Be Kind Rewind (supervising sound editor and re-recording mixer)
- 2006 – God Grew Tired of Us (supervising sound editor and re-recording mixer)
- 2005 – Street Fight (re-recording mixer)

As composer

- 2021 – Ruby
- 2016 – Modern Houses
- 2006 – Flannel Pajamas
- 2002 – Justice and the Generals
- 2001 – Limón: A Life Beyond Words

== Awards and nominations ==
Year	Award	Category	Work	Result	Ref.
2022	Satellite Awards	Best Sound	Tick, Tick... Boom!	Won	
2022	Cinema Audio Society Awards	Outstanding Achievement in Sound Mixing for a Motion Picture – Documentary	Summer of Soul	Won	
2022	Cinema Eye Honors	Outstanding Achievement in Sound Design	Summer of Soul	Nominated	
2021	Primetime Emmy Awards	Outstanding Sound Mixing for a Variety Series or Special	American Utopia	Won	
2013	News and Documentary Emmy Awards	Outstanding Music and Sound	In Tahrir Square: 18 Days of Egypt's Unfinished Revolution	Won	
2011	Motion Picture Sound Editors	Outstanding Achievement in Sound Editing – Sound Effects and Foley for Feature Film	Salt	Nominated	
2006	Primetime Emmy Awards	Outstanding Sound Mixing for a Nonfiction or Reality Program (Single or Multi-Camera)	Baghdad ER	Nominated	
1999	Primetime Emmy Awards	Outstanding Sound Editing for a Nonfiction or Reality Program (Single or Multi-Camera)	The Farm: Angola, USA	Nominated	
