= Selective mutism =

Anxiety disorder blocking speech

- Specialty: Psychiatry, laryngology

Selective mutism (SM) is an anxiety disorder in which a person who is otherwise capable of speech becomes emotionally overwhelmed and does not speak when exposed to specific situations, specific places, or to specific people, one or multiple of which serve as triggers. This kind of mutism usually co-exists with social anxiety disorder. People with selective mutism may stay silent even when the consequences of their silence include shame, social ostracism, or punishment. In some cases, the affected person wants to speak, but feel like they can not get the words out.

== Signs and symptoms ==
The DSM-5 describes selective mutism as a persistent difficulty with speaking in specific social settings where speech is expected, such as in school, despite an ability to speak in other situations. The symptoms should not be too temporary and they must affect the person's ability to perform in a certain situation. Consideration should be given to possible other diagnoses.

Children and adults with selective mutism are fully capable of speech and understanding language but may be completely unable to speak in certain situations, even if speech is expected of them. This behaviour may be perceived as shyness for some or rudeness by others. A child with selective mutism may be completely silent at school for years but speak quite freely or even excessively at home. There is a hierarchical variation among people with this disorder: some people participate fully in activities and appear social but do not speak, others will speak only to peers but not to adults, others will speak to adults when asked questions requiring short answers but never to peers, and still others speak to no one and participate in few, if any, activities presented to them. In a severe form known as "progressive mutism", the disorder progresses until the person with this condition no longer speaks to anyone in any situation, even close family members.

Selective mutism is strongly associated with other anxiety disorders, particularly social anxiety disorder. In fact, the majority of children diagnosed with selective mutism have comorbid social anxiety disorder (100% of participants in two studies and 97% in another). Selective mutism is sometimes conflated with autism, particularly among young children; this happens most frequently when a child acts particularly withdrawn around their diagnostician, and can lead to misdiagnosis and ineffective treatment. Although many autistic people are also selectively mute, they often display other behaviors—stimming, repetitive behaviors, social isolation even among family members (not always answering to name, for example)—that set them apart from a child with selective mutism alone. Some autistic people may be selectively mute due to anxiety in unfamiliar social situations. If mutism is entirely due to autism spectrum disorder, it cannot be diagnosed as selective mutism as stated in the last item on the list above.

The former name elective mutism indicates a widespread misconception among psychologists that selectively mute people choose to be silent in certain situations, while the truth is that they often wish to speak but are unable to do so. To reflect the involuntary nature of this disorder, the name was changed to selective mutism in 1994, although this name remains controversial. The name situational mutism was first suggested by Alice Sluckin, and has been used by some activists and autism researchers such as Damian Milton, arguing that the current name still carries the implication that people with the condition are choosing to be mute.

The incidence of selective mutism is not certain. Due to the poor understanding of this condition by the general public, many cases are likely undiagnosed. Based on the number of reported cases, the figure is commonly estimated to be 1 in 1000, 0.1%. However, a 2002 study in The Journal of the American Academy of Child and Adolescent Psychiatry estimated the incidence to be 0.71%.

=== Other symptoms ===
In addition to reduced speech, people with selective mutism may display other associated behaviours and characteristics.

- Shyness, social anxiety, fear of social embarrassment, or social withdrawal
- Difficulty maintaining eye contact
- Reduced facial expression or difficulty smiling
- Difficulty expressing feelings, including to family members
- A tendency to worry
- Sensitivity to noise or crowds

== Causes ==
Selective mutism (SM) is an umbrella term for the condition of otherwise well-developed children or adults who cannot speak or communicate under certain settings. Selective mutism could be caused due to a combination of genetic, environmental, and developmental factors. Key causes include inherited anxious temperament, high social anxiety, family history of anxiety, sensory processing issues, and language delays. Many people are not diagnosed until late in childhood only because they do not speak at school and therefore fail to accomplish assignments requiring public speaking. Their involuntary silence makes the condition harder to understand or test. Parents often are unaware of the condition since the children may be functioning well at home. Teachers and pediatricians also sometimes mistake it for severe shyness or common stage fright.

Most children and adults with selective mutism are hypothesized to have an inherited predisposition to anxiety. They often have inhibited temperaments, which is hypothesized to be the result of over-excitability of the area of the brain called the amygdala. This area receives indications of possible threats and sets off the fight-or-flight response. Behavioral inhibitions, or inhibited temperaments, encompass feelings of emotional distress and social withdrawals. In a 2016 study, the relationship between behavioral inhibition and selective mutism was investigated. Children between the ages of three and 19 with lifetime selective mutism, social phobia, internalizing behavior, and healthy controls were assessed using the parent-rated Retrospective Infant Behavioral Inhibition (RIBI) questionnaire, consisting of 20 questions that addressed shyness and fear, as well as other subscales. The results indicated behavioral inhibition does indeed predispose selective mutism. Corresponding with the researchers' hypothesis, children diagnosed with long-term selective mutism had a higher behavioral inhibition score as an infant. This is indicative of the positive correlation between behavioral inhibition and selective mutism.

Given the very high incidence of social anxiety disorder within selective mutism (as high as 100% in some studies), it is possible that social anxiety disorder causes selective mutism. Some children or adults with selective mutism may have trouble processing sensory information. This could cause anxiety and a sense of being overwhelmed in unfamiliar situations, which may cause the child or adult to "shut down" and not be able to speak (something that some autistic people also experience). Many children or adults with selective mutism have some auditory processing difficulties. Many children or adults who have selective mutism almost always speak confidently in some situations.

About 20–30% of children or adults with selective mutism have speech or language disorders that add stress to situations in which the child is expected to speak. In the DSM-4, the term "elective mutism" was changed to "selective mutism". This name change intended to deemphasize this refusal and oppositional aspect of the disorder. Instead, it highlighted that in select environments, the child is unable to speak rather than choosing not to. In fact, children with selective mutism have a lower rate of oppositional behavior than their peers in a school setting. Some previous studies on the subject of selective mutism have been dismissed as containing serious flaws in their design.

Some have suggested a connection between selective mutism and the freeze response. According to the unsafe world model of selective mutism, selective mutism is a stress reaction to situations erroneously experienced via cognition without awareness as unsafe. It assumes a high sensitivity to unsafety, whereby the nervous system triggers dissociation or freeze mode at relatively low thresholds. Various factors could influence the process of distinguishing safe from unsafe contexts. Environmental influences (family dysfunction, traumatic or stressful life events, parental control, negative experiences at school, and immigrant status) have shown some involvement in the origins of selective mutism, however research and the evidence for the contribution of these factors is limited. According to a systematic study it is believed that children or adults who have selective mutism are not more likely than other children or adults to have a history of early trauma or stressful life events. This could be because abuse is only one of several risk factors for selective mutism.

== Prevalence ==
Estimates of the prevalence of selective mutism (the fraction of the population experiencing it at any given time) face methodological challenges, and vary between 0.2% and 1.6%. Studies disagree as to whether prevalence is higher among males, females or neither. Prevalence is slightly higher among children who have immigrated to a different country, speak a minority language, or have speech or language delays.

== Treatment ==
Contrary to popular belief, people with selective mutism do not necessarily improve with age. Effective treatment is necessary for a child to develop properly. Without treatment, selective mutism can contribute to chronic depression, further anxiety, and other social and emotional problems.

The exact treatment depends on the person's age, any comorbid mental illnesses, and a number of other factors. For instance, stimulus fading is typically used with younger children because older children and teenagers recognize the situation as an attempt to make them speak, and older people with this condition and people with depression are more likely to need medication.

Like other disabilities, adequate accommodations are needed for those with the condition to succeed at school, work, and in the home. In the United States, under the Individuals with Disabilities Education Act (IDEA), a federal law, those with the disorder qualify for services based upon the fact that they have an impairment that hinders their ability to speak, thus disrupting their lives. This assistance is typically documented in the form of an Individualized Education Program (IEP). Post-secondary accommodations are also available for people with disabilities. Another federal law, the Americans with Disabilities Act (ADA), provides protections for distinct civil rights regarding effective communication.

Under another law in the US, Section 504 of the Rehabilitation Act of 1973, public school districts are required to provide a free, appropriate public education to every "qualified handicapped person" residing within their jurisdiction. If the child is found to have impairments that substantially limit a major life activity (in this case, learning), the education agency has to decide what related aids or services are required to provide equal access to the learning environment.

Social Communication Anxiety Treatment (S-CAT) is a common treatment approach by professionals and has proven to be successful. S-CAT integrates components of behavioral-therapy, cognitive-behavioral therapy (CBT), and an insight-oriented approach to increase social communication and promote social confidence. Tactics such as systemic desensitization, modeling, fading, and positive reinforcement enable individuals to develop social engagement skills and begin to progress communicatively in a step-by-step manner.

=== Self-modeling ===
An affected child is brought into the classroom or the environment where the child will not speak and is videotaped. First, the teacher or another adult prompts the child with questions that likely will not be answered. A parent, or someone the child feels comfortable speaking to, then replaces the prompter and asks the child the same questions, this time eliciting a verbal response. The two videos of the conversations are then edited together to show the child directly answering the questions posed by the teacher or other adult. This video is then shown to the child over a series of several weeks, and every time the child sees themself verbally answering the teacher/other adult, the tape is stopped and the child is given positive reinforcement.

Such videos can also be shown to affected children's classmates to set an expectation in their peers that they can speak. The classmates thereby learn the sound of the child's voice and, albeit through editing, have the opportunity to see the child conversing with the teacher.

=== Mystery motivators ===
Mystery motivation is often paired with self-modeling. An envelope is placed in the child's classroom in a visible place. On the envelope, the child's name is written along with a question mark. Inside is an item that the child's parent has determined to be desirable to the child. The child is told that when they ask for the envelope loudly enough for the teacher and others in the classroom to hear, the child will receive the mystery motivator. The class is also told of the expectation that the child ask for the envelope loudly enough that the class can hear.

=== Stimulus fading ===
Affected subjects can be brought into a controlled environment with someone with whom they are at ease and can communicate. Gradually, another person is introduced into the situation. One example of stimulus fading is the sliding-in technique, where a new person is slowly brought into the talking group. This can take a long time for the first one or two faded-in people but may become faster as the patient gets more comfortable with the technique.

As an example, a child may be playing a board game with a family member in a classroom at school. Gradually, the teacher is brought in to play as well. When the child adjusts to the teacher's presence, then a peer is brought in to be a part of the game. Each person is only brought in if the child continues to engage verbally and positively.

=== Desensitization ===
The subject communicates indirectly with a person to whom they are afraid to speak through such means as email, instant messaging (text, audio or video), online chat, voice or video recordings, and speaking or whispering to an intermediary in the presence of the target person. This can make the subject more comfortable with the idea of communicating with this person.

=== Shaping ===
The subject is slowly encouraged to speak. The subject is reinforced first for interacting nonverbally, then for saying certain sounds (such as the sound that each letter of the alphabet makes) rather than words, then for whispering, and finally saying a word or more.

=== Spacing ===
Spacing is important to integrate, especially with self-modeling. Repeated and spaced out use of interventions is shown to be the most helpful long-term for learning. Viewing videotapes of self-modeling should be shown over a spaced out period of time of approximately 6 weeks.

=== Medication ===
Some practitioners believe there would be evidence indicating anxiolytics to be helpful in treating children and adults with selective mutism, to decrease anxiety levels and thereby speed the process of therapy.

Since selective mutism is categorized as an anxiety disorder, using similar medication to treat either makes sense. Antidepressants have been used in addition to self-modeling and mystery motivation to aid in the learning process. Selective serotonin reuptake inhibitors (SSRIs) in particular have been used to treat selective mutism. In a systematic review, ten studies were looked at which involved SSRI medications, and all reported medication was well tolerated. In one of them, Black and Uhde (1994) conducted a double-blind, placebo-controlled study investigating the effects of fluoxetine. By parent report, fluoxetine-treated children showed significantly greater improvement than placebo-treated children. In another, Dummit III et al. (1996) administered fluoxetine to 21 children for nine weeks and found that 76% of the children had reduced or no symptoms by the end of the experiment. These small studies reported possible benefits from fluoxetine, but the limited evidence does not permit firm conclusions about its effectiveness.

== History ==
In 1877, German physician Adolph Kussmaul described children who were able to speak normally but often refused to as having a disorder he named aphasia voluntaria. Although this is now an obsolete term, it was part of an early effort to describe the concept now called selective mutism.

In 1980, a study by Torey Hayden identified what she called four "subtypes" of elective mutism (as it was called then), although this set of subtypes is not in current diagnostic use. These subtypes are no longer recognized, though "speech phobia" is sometimes used to describe a selectively mute person who appears not to have any symptoms of social anxiety.

The Diagnostic and Statistical Manual of Mental Disorders (DSM), first published in 1952, first included selective mutism in its third edition, published in 1980. Selective mutism was described as "a continuous refusal to speak in almost all social situations" despite normal ability to speak. While "excessive shyness" and other anxiety-related traits were listed as associated features, predisposing factors included "maternal overprotection", "mental retardation", and trauma. Elective mutism in the third edition revised (DSM III-R) is described similarly to the third edition except for specifying that the disorder is not related to social phobia.

In 1994, Sue Newman, co-founder of the Selective Mutism Foundation, requested that the fourth edition of the DSM reflect the name change from elective mutism to selective mutism and describe the disorder as a failure to speak. The relation to anxiety disorders was emphasized, particularly in the revised version (DSM IV-TR). As part of the reorganization of the DSM categories, the DSM-5 moved selective mutism from the section "Disorders Usually First Diagnosed in Infancy, Childhood, or Adolescence" to the section for anxiety disorders.

== Society and culture ==
In the UK teen-drama Skins, Effy Stonem is believed to have suffered from selective mutism. For the whole first season of the show, Effy does not speak at all and only communicates with her family or friends through her expressions. She was even confronted about it: Michelle, her older brother's girlfriend, asked: "Why don't you speak, Effy? Does nobody ask you why? It must mean something. Doesn't anybody care?".

In The Big Bang Theory, Raj Koothrappali could not speak to women. Specifically, he says, "Excuse me, I have selective mutism, a recognized medical disorder. You're just a douche."

== See also ==
- Communication disorder
- June and Jennifer Gibbons, the Silent Twins
- Nonverbal autism
