= Orange Is the New Black season 6 =

Orange Is the New Black
- Season 6
- Promotional poster
- Starring: Taylor Schilling; Natasha Lyonne; Uzo Aduba; Danielle Brooks; Jackie Cruz; Laura Gómez; Selenis Leyva; Taryn Manning; Adrienne C. Moore; Matt Peters; Jessica Pimentel; Dascha Polanco; Elizabeth Rodriguez; Nick Sandow; Dale Soules; Yael Stone; Kate Mulgrew; Laura Prepon
- No. of episodes: 13

Release
- Original network: Netflix
- Original release: July 27, 2018

Season chronology
- ← Previous; Season 5 Next → Season 7

The sixth season of the American comedy-drama television series Orange Is the New Black premiered on Netflix on July 27, 2018, at 12:00 am PDT in multiple countries. It consists of thirteen episodes, each between 50 and 84 minutes. The series is based on Piper Kerman's memoir, Orange Is the New Black: My Year in a Women's Prison (2010), about her experiences at FCI Danbury, a minimum-security federal prison. The series is created and adapted for television by Jenji Kohan.

This season takes place in a maximum security prison, after the inmates incite a riot at Litchfield Penitentiary during the previous season, and the season deals with the fallout from the riot. The main story arc of the season involves a gang-like war between two cell blocks which is sparked by the feud between two sisters. Meanwhile, the guards play a fantasy sport game called "fantasy inmate". Several supporting characters who appeared throughout the first five seasons are absent in this season due to change in setting, but this season introduces several new characters featured in maximum security.

== Cast and characters ==
=== Main cast ===
- Taylor Schilling as Piper Chapman, inmate
- Natasha Lyonne as Nicky Nichols, inmate
- Uzo Aduba as Suzanne Warren, inmate
- Danielle Brooks as Tasha "Taystee" Jefferson, inmate
- Jackie Cruz as Marisol "Flaca" Gonzales, inmate
- Laura Gómez as Blanca Flores, inmate
- Selenis Leyva as Gloria Mendoza, inmate
- Taryn Manning as Tiffany "Pennsatucky" Doggett, inmate
- Adrienne C. Moore as Cindy "Black Cindy" Hayes, inmate
- Matt Peters as Joel Luschek, correctional officer
- Jessica Pimentel as Maria Ruiz, inmate
- Dascha Polanco as Dayanara "Daya" Diaz, inmate
- Elizabeth Rodriguez as Aleida Diaz, former inmate
- Nick Sandow as Joe Caputo, former warden
- Dale Soules as Frieda Berlin, inmate
- Yael Stone as Lorna Morello, inmate
- Kate Mulgrew as Galina "Red" Reznikov, inmate
- Laura Prepon as Alex Vause, inmate

=== Guest stars ===
- Michael J. Harney as Sam Healy
- Lea DeLaria as Carrie "Big Boo" Black
- Alex Trebek as himself
- Rosal Colon as Carmen "Ouija" Aziza
- Francesca Curran as Helen "Skinhead Helen" Van Maele
- Willie Casper Perry as Slide Orderly

=== Recurring cast ===
==== Inmates ====
- Amanda Fuller as Madison "Badison" Murphy
- Finnerty Steeves as Beth Hoefler
- Alice Kremelberg as Nicole Eckelcamp
- Vicci Martinez as Dominga "Daddy" Duarte
- Laverne Cox as Sophia Burset
- Ashley Bacon as Young Frieda Berlin
- Henny Russell as Carol Denning
  - Ashley Jordyn as Young Carol Denning
- Mackenzie Phillips as Barbara "Barb" Denning
  - Lauren Kelston as Young Barbara "Barb" Denning
- Sipiwe Moyo as Adeola Chinede
- Phumzile Sithole as Akers
- Daniella De Jesus as Irene "Zirconia" Cabrera
- Shannon Esper as Alana Dwight
- Lori Petty as Lolly Whitehill
- Christina Toth as Annalisa Damiva
- Kana Hatakeyama as Charlene Teng
- Reema Sampat as Shruti Chambal
- Jo Lampert as Marie Brock
- Shirley Roeca as Vazquez
- Rebecca Knox as Tina Swope

==== Staff ====
- Alysia Reiner as Natalie Figueroa, interim warden
- Emily Tarver as CO Artesian McCullough
- Susan Heyward as CO Tamika Ward
- Nicholas Webber as CO Alvarez
- Shawna Hamic as CO Copeland a.k.a. Ginger
- Greg Vrotsos as CO Hellman
- Mike Houston as CO Lee Dixon
- James McMenamin as Charlie Coates
- Josh Segarra as CO Stefanovic
- Beth Dover as Linda Ferguson
- Nick Dillenburg as CO Blake
- Branden Wellington as CO Jarod Young
- Hunter Emery as CO Rick Hopper

==== Others ====
- Michael J. Burg as Agent Mark Bellamy
- Ali Ahn as Agent Nguyen
- Alexander Wraith as Vasily Reznikov
- Miguel Izaguirre as Diablo
- Karina Ortiz as Margarita

== Episodes ==
No. overall	No. in season	Title	Directed by	Written by	Featured character(s)	Original release date
66	1	"Who Knows Better Than I"	Michael Trim	Jenji Kohan	Suzanne & Cindy	July 27, 2018
Suzanne has hallucinations while getting back on her medications. She is the first to be interviewed for a federal investigation into the riot and murders. Those found in the bunker are held in isolation at Litchfield's maximum security prison, and they face various abuses from the guards and inmates. Frieda attempts suicide, while Red confronts her roommate, Badison, to protect her family. Piper desperately tries to find Alex, and fears the worst when she learns a prisoner had died in the riot. Gloria tries to attack Maria, but they are handcuffed and forced to kiss by the guards. Taystee is visited by CO Tamika Ward, who had been her friend on the outside. Suzanne is released from questioning and is brought to the prison, which she realizes is not her "home" anymore. Flashback: Suzanne and Cindy hide in the pool and witness CERT officers stage Piscatella's body as if the inmates killed him with his own gun. On the bus, Red provides a story that Piscatella brought them in the pool to torture them. Suzanne snaps at the false version of events, but Cindy insists they lie so the guards won't kill them.
67	2	"Sh*tstorm Coming"	Mark A. Burley	Brian Chamberlayne	Cindy	July 27, 2018
Detectives are pressured to file charges on two murderers and three riot leaders within a week. Daya makes a plea agreement for Humphrey's murder, while Taystee is considered a leader as the public face of the riot. Cindy tries (and fails) to warn Taystee about the framing with a note, but when she learns their fingerprints are on Piscatella's gun, Cindy turns on Taystee to save herself. Gloria names Maria as the riot's mastermind and pressures Blanca to do the same. Despite Maria's attempts to frame Gloria, MCC corroborates Gloria's story and she gets immunity for her testimony. Piper bonds with her cellmate, Beth, but she later learns that Beth killed her children. Caputo becomes depressed while on suspension. He reconnects with Figueroa, who is now interim warden. Dixon invites himself on a road trip with Coates, not realizing that Pennsatucky is hiding in the trunk. Flashback: Flashbacks depict Cindy's teenage pregnancy, and how she abandoned the infant to her mother's care.
68	3	"Look Out for Number One"	Erin Feeley	Hilary Weisman Graham	Frieda	July 27, 2018
Linda is identified in a Cleveland prison. When she threatens to sue MCC for $10 million, she is promoted to senior vice president. Red learns of Piscatella's death during her interview, and fails to inform the others; Piper misinterprets Red's message to mean Alex was killed in the pool. Nicky is threatened with drug, theft, and distribution charges to pressure her testimony against Red. Frieda retrieves Cindy's note and fakes senility in her interview. She is transferred to B Block with the old-timers and crazies, including Suzanne. In general population, inmates learn the power structure: D Block is run by Barbara, and C Block is run by Carol, two antagonistic sisters at the head of a decades-old feud. After Daya is beaten by a guard, Daya's roommate, Daddy, gives her oxycodone. On work detail, Cindy, Flaca, Daya and Morello steal toiletries, but the products are sabotaged as an initiation. Flashback: In the 1980s, Frieda - in Litchfield Max - antagonizes a rivalry between Carol and Barbara. While the sisters attack each other on the kickball field, Frieda turns over Carol's stash to the warden for a transfer to minimum security.
69	4	"I'm the Talking Ass"	Phil Abraham	Tami Sagher	Nicky	July 27, 2018
Blake, Luschek and McCullough return to duty; McCullough is suffering from PTSD following the riot. They are invited into the fantasy inmate league, a game played by the guards where they gamble on inmate deaths and injuries. Alex returns to general population and reunites with Piper. It is revealed that Maureen was the inmate who died in the riot. Coates, Dixon and Pennsatucky spend their day at an amusement park. Aleida struggles with employment outside of prison, and she gets involved in a pyramid scheme selling dietary shakes. Taystee speaks with Caputo after learning she is being charged for Piscatella's murder. Nicky tells Red about the drug charges and gets Red's permission to testify against her. Flashback: Nicky's selfish divorced parents fight through revisions to her bat mitzvah speech. During her speech, Nicky, inspired by her Torah portion of Balaam's Talking Ass, mocks God for the Holocaust and her parents for neglecting her, while comparing herself to the donkey who suddenly found its voice after enduring abuse.
70	5	"Mischief Mischief"	Andrew McCarthy	Anthony Natoli	none	July 27, 2018
Luschek hosts the fantasy inmate draft party, and he replaces CO Alvarez as league commissioner. CO Copeland gets fantasy inmate points when she instigates a fight between Piper and Maria. Alex helps Badison with a prank to make peace. Daddy instructs her D Block gang to release rats in the cheese-packaging facility, in hopes that C Block will be fired and D Block will get the work assignments. Blanca reveals that Maria set the hostages free, thwarting Maria's attempts to join a gang. Later, someone tries to drown Maria in a toilet. Afraid that someone in B Block has been sent to kill her, Frieda agrees to be Suzanne's cellmate. Linda blackmails Caputo into taking a dead-end job at a Missouri prison. She also calls a manhunt for the missing prisoner in the riot. Coates convinces Pennsatucky to hike across the Canadian border, but when his anger resurfaces, Pennsatucky secretly leaves him and turns herself in as the missing prisoner.
71	6	"State of the Uterus"	Constantine Makris	Merritt Tierce	Daddy	July 27, 2018
Daddy's rat prank results in MCC losing the lucrative cheese-packaging contract and unintentionally closing the route that CO Hellman uses for smuggling. Badison seeks revenge by having her people defecate in D Block's laundry. Daddy further incites her strung-out followers by blaming C Block for cutting off their supply. Daya consoles Daddy. Luschek is made head of recreation and interviews radio show acts. Flaca looks for a co-host and finds an unexpected rapport with Cindy. Gloria fears she is entering menopause. Blanca learns that she has limited fertility. Red signs a plea agreement to inciting the riot to avoid other charges. In court, Taystee pleads guilty to inciting the riot but not guilty to murder; the ACLU offers representation for Taystee, and the Black Lives Matter movement pressures MCC into taking Taystee out of solitary. Piper proposes a prison wedding to Alex. Aleida visits her kids in foster care, but discovers that none of them want anything to do with her. Flashback: Daddy ran a house of college escorts to successful Latino businessmen. Although a woman is killed at a party, Daddy covers it up and soon provides another escort for the client.
72	7	"Changing Winds"	Andrew McCarthy	Heather Jeng Bladt	Badison	July 27, 2018
Carol holds Badison accountable for Daddy's prank that cost them their cushy job and cuts her out. Badison consults with Alex and convinces Luschek to smuggle valuable smartphones. Though Alex doesn't want to take part, she ends up with the phone when Badison is stabbed in the yard by Daddy's girls. Strung-out, Daya steals Barbara's personal stash; Daddy is incensed and they have angry sex. Taystee receives fan mail, which the guards redact. Suzanne reunites with Taystee and Cindy, but she doesn't know how to talk with them while keeping the secret. After being suspected of an attempted suicide, Maria is released from Psych with the suggestion of finding religion. Pennsatucky blackmails Linda for a bunk in B Block. Preparing to leave town, Caputo goes on his first real date with Figueroa, and tries to give her closure for a past event. Considering writing a memoir, Piper examines the library and finds old photos from before the feud. Piper determines to heal divisions by bringing back kickball. Flashback: Bullied Badison acts out, is expelled from school, and sent to a boot camp for troubled teens where she tries to find acceptance by severely bullying the weakest girl.
73	8	"Gordons"	Sian Heder	Vera Santamaria	Taystee & Tamika	July 27, 2018
Alex hides the cellphone through a lockdown and search. She finds more money added to her commissary, despite wanting to stay out of the gang. Gloria helps Luschek with his dance-aerobics class. Piper extorts Luschek to return kickball. Daddy asks Daya to buy drugs through her friends in C Block. Blanca, wanting a baby due to her limited fertility, provides Daya the drugs in exchange for retrieving Diablo's sperm donation from the visitation washroom. The swap is noticed and Daya is beaten by C Block inmates. However, Daya manages to save four pills for Daddy. Blanca and Nicky are surrounded by the same gang during the insemination procedure. Red schemes against Frieda and gains an alliance with Carol. Aleida is stopped from selling outside the prison by CO Hopper, who takes her out for a date. In a media interview, Taystee describes guard abuses and has her mail cut off by Tamika. Flashback: Tamika and Taystee get high while working a night shift at a fast food restaurant. When they are threatened by a robber, Taystee lies and claims she cannot open the register that late without activating the security cameras. The robber steals her shoes instead. Tamika is impressed by Taystee's quick thinking; Taystee reveals that there are no security cameras, but she decided against calling the police as they would be arrested for being high.
74	9	"Break the String"	Nick Sandow	Kirsa Rein	none	July 27, 2018
Zirconia becomes jealous when Gloria causes Luschek to get an erection in dance-aerobics class. Zirconia tells Badison that Gloria is turning Luschek against her, and Badison threatens Gloria against returning to class. Daddy gives Barbara "bath salts", sidelining her in the infirmary. Nicky bonds with Barbara over addiction experiences and Barbara agrees to get clean. Red reconnects with her real family, and learns her husband is having an affair. Full of vengeance, Red climbs into Carol's inner circle. Piper gains Carol's permission for kickball. When Maria signs the church ladies, Carol then demands her people form an opposing team, to Piper's dismay. Caputo is deposed ahead of Taystee's trial, and he admits that she did break his nose. Linda confronts Caputo over the deposition, and Caputo quits on the spot. Cindy continues to struggle with guilt, but she fails to confess her betrayal to Taystee. Aleida refuses to smuggle drugs for Daya until she is evicted and forced into domesticity with Hopper.
75	10	"Chocolate Chip Nookie"	Ludovic Littee	Carolina Paiz	Carol & Barb	July 27, 2018
Aleida uses Hopper as an unwitting mule to bring drugs into the prison by using a false bottom of the dietary shake container, but as the weight is increased, Hopper discovers the tampering. The inmate league has seen little action since segregating the blocks, so Luschek agrees to an interblock kickball championship in the field. In warmups, Piper is confirmed as C Block captain over Badison. Gloria continues to be harassed, and is transferred to D Block with Daya and Maria. Barbara achieves 30 days of sobriety. Now with new clarity, Barbara plots to kill Carol, who she blames for spiking her drugs. Cindy makes an anonymous call to Caputo, provoking him into questioning a suspicious CERT member; Figueroa advises him to instead work the PR campaign. Frieda apologizes for misleading Suzanne and explains the block feud. Flashback: In 1983, high schoolers Barb and Carol kill their younger sister whose gymnastics training was causing the family to move. In Litchfield, an argument over an anecdote led to the sisters' separation and the block feud.
76	11	"Well This Took a Dark Turn"	Laura Prepon	Anthony Natoli	none	July 27, 2018
Hopper confronts Aleida about the drugs but, nearing 10 years at Litchfield, he continues the operation. Badison vomits when Piper has her team run sprints. Badison tries to extend Piper's sentence by planting drugs on her, but the plan fails. When Frieda discovers that a wealthy inmate, Gladys, had been paid by Carol to kill her, Frieda cuts her own arm to frame Gladys. Barbara sends her gang to kill Carol and her lieutenants at the salon; Nicky joins as a lookout to warn Red, but her message is intercepted and a guard takes Carol into protective custody. Nicky talks her way out of suspicion. Caputo asks Sophia to join a lawsuit with other inmates wronged by MCC, but Linda offers settlements and early release to everyone he'd visited. Sophia agrees and signs a non-disclosure agreement. Maria is inspired to be a good person, but this quickly ends when Beth admits to attacking her. Cindy testifies against Taystee after being told that changing her story would make her an unreliable witness. Aiming for league points, Copeland locks Barbara in Carol's cell.
77	12	"Double Trouble"	Clark Johnson	Hilary Weisman Graham	none	July 27, 2018
Barbara and Carol agree to a truce, then each declare war to their blocks. Caputo tells Taystee that she has a chance if she can win over the jury. McCullough snaps after a kickball bursts. MCC is being rebranded to PolyCon Corrections. Alex asks Badison to leave Piper alone. Instead, Badison hires Hellman to frame Piper. To keep Badison in line, Alex agrees to work for Carol. Hellman gives a fraudulent incident report to Hopper, to whom Piper had promised to inform on drug activities. Deciding that Piper is an unnecessary risk to his drug operation, Hopper destroys the report and puts Piper at the top of Linda's new inmate-ranking system, so that she'll be released at the end of the week. Gloria helps with Flaca's radio show in order to warn Luschek about the impending block war, but Luschek is called away at the last second. Gloria discovers Luschek's fantasy inmate data, and tries to expose it on the radio. She fails, and Alvarez sends her to solitary. Red prepares for her first visitation with her grandchildren, but she ruins it to attack Frieda in the hallway.
78	13	"Be Free"	Nick Sandow	Brian Chamberlayne	Carol & Barb	July 27, 2018
Piper, Sophia and Blanca are told they'll be released the next day - the day of the kickball championship. Piper and Alex are "prison married" by Nicky. Aleida is shocked to see Daya high on heroin, but she continues supplying her eldest to save her younger children. Taystee is found guilty. Caputo confronts a CERT member, who punches him; Figueroa sets aside business to tend Caputo's wounds. Luschek visits Gloria, who challenges him to stop the fight. Carol and Barbara meet in a closet; the war is a diversion for them to infiltrate B Block and kill Frieda. Maria has a change of heart and convinces McCullough to let the captains pick new teams, mixing the blocks. When Badison signals the attack, Suzanne kicks a high ball and the inmates are caught in the excitement of the play. With no fight causing a lockdown, Barbara and Carol's antagonism results in their deaths, bumping Copeland from last to first in fantasy inmate. Lorna goes into labor and is brought to medical in distress. Piper and Sophia are united with family members, but Blanca is taken into custody by Immigration and Customs Enforcement, for which PolyCon is running a new detention facility. Flashback: The anecdote Carol and Barbara both claimed happened to them as waitresses (bringing a customer a newspaper after mishearing a request for a "glass of ice" as "classifieds") actually happened to a co-worker who told them the story.

== Production ==
In February 2016, Netflix gave the series a three-season renewal, which included its sixth season. For the sixth season, Laura Gómez, Matt Peters and Dale Soules were promoted to series regulars.

== Reception ==
=== Critical response ===
The sixth season received positive reviews from critics, with most critics noting its improvement over the previous season. On Metacritic, it has a score of 69 out of 100 based on 14 reviews. On Rotten Tomatoes, it has an 83% rating with an average score of 7.3 out of 10 based on 35 reviews. The site's critical consensus reads: "Brutality and humor continue to mesh effectively in a season of Orange Is the New Black that stands as a marked improvement from its predecessor, even if some arcs are more inspired than others."

=== Accolades ===
For the 71st Primetime Emmy Awards, Laverne Cox received a nomination for Outstanding Guest Actress in a Drama Series.
