= Alex Vause =

Character from Orange is the New Black

- Orange Is the New Black character
- Laura Prepon as Alex Vause
- First appearance: "I Wasn't Ready" (2013)
- Last appearance: "Here's Where We Get Off" (2019)
- Portrayed by: Laura Prepon; Rachel Resheff (young)

In-universe information
- Family: Diane Vause (mother); Lee Burley (father)
- Significant others: Piper Chapman (wife); Sylvia (ex-girlfriend)

Alexandra "Alex" Pearl Vause is a fictional character played by Laura Prepon on the Netflix series, Orange Is the New Black. The character is loosely based on the real ex-girlfriend of Piper Kerman, author of Orange Is the New Black: My Year in a Women's Prison. Before her arrest, Vause worked for an international drug cartel and was in a relationship with protagonist Piper Chapman, who once transported drug money for her during their travels. Vause is portrayed as the catalyst for Chapman's indictment. She is reunited with her ex-lover in federal prison, nearly a decade after the events that led to their breakup. Her relationship with Chapman is reignited, as they carry out a tumultuous love affair in prison.

Vause is noted for her pragmatism, forthrightness, wit and veiled vulnerability. She is a main character in seasons one, three, four, five, six, and seven and a recurring character in season two. The character received acclaim from television critics, who often cite Alex as one of the series' best characters. For her performance, Prepon won the Satellite Award for Best Supporting Actress – Series, Miniseries or Television Film at the 18th Satellite Awards in 2014.

== Inspiration ==
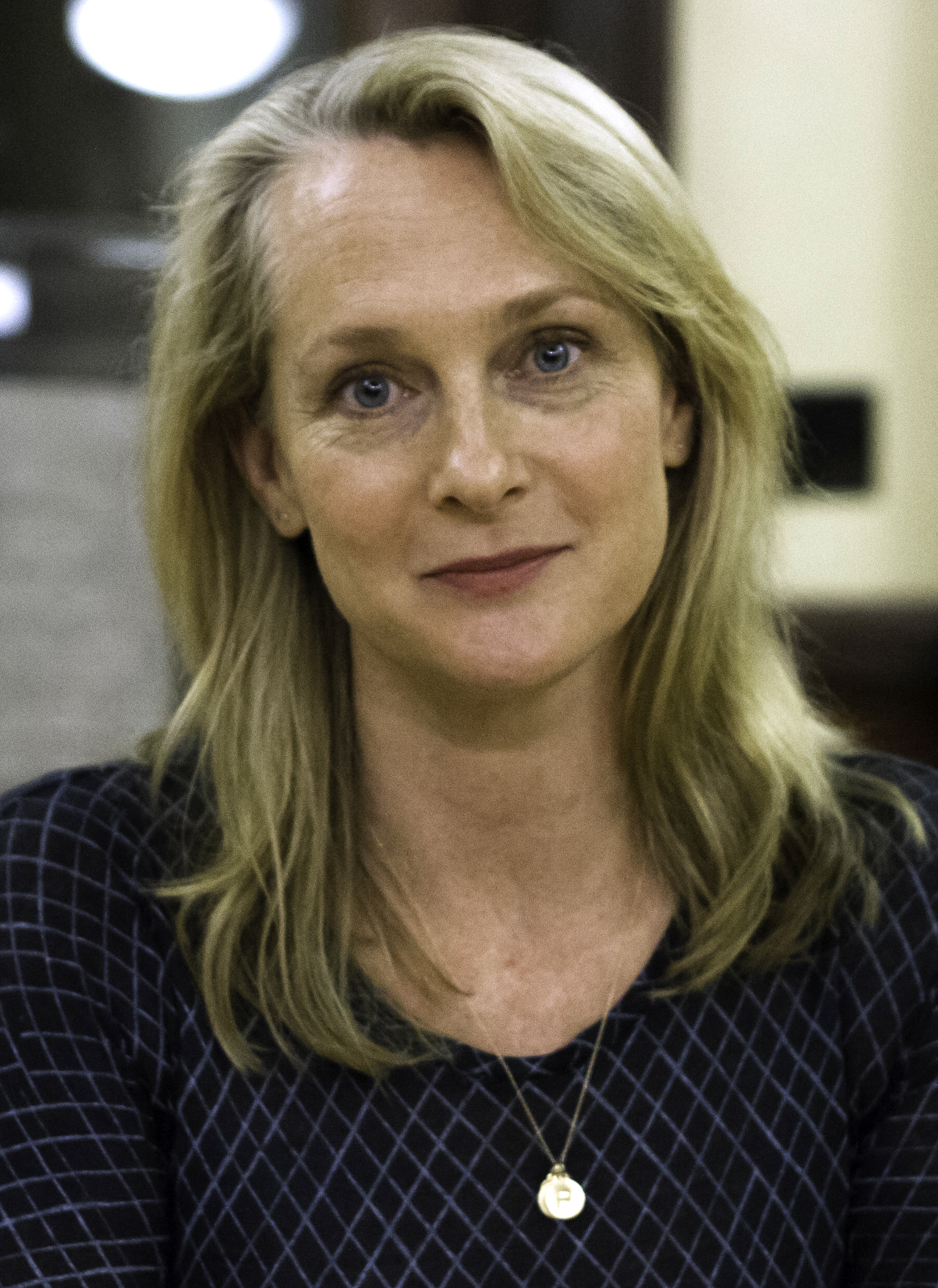
Piper Kerman (pictured) had a relationship with Catherine Cleary Wolters, who served as the main source of inspiration for the character of Alex Vause.

The character of Alex Vause is loosely based on Catherine Cleary Wolters, ex-girlfriend of Piper Kerman, the author of Orange Is the New Black: My Year in a Women's Prison and an executive consultant on the series. In Kerman's memoir, Wolters is given the pseudonym Nora Jansen, who is a marginal character in the book. In actuality, Kerman and Wolters did not serve their prison sentences together as depicted in the series; however, they were reunited in a flight to Chicago, where they were detained for several weeks in a detention facility to testify in the drug trafficking case. Their stint in Chicago is portrayed in the series' second season; however, the defendant they were to testify against was changed to the cartel's kingpin, as was that Wolters and Kerman were cell-mates in the prison.

Wolters met Kerman in 1991 in Northampton, Massachusetts, becoming friends around the time Kerman graduated from Smith College. Kerman wrote in her memoir that Wolters was part of a "clique of impossibly stylish and cool lesbians in their mid-30s". Wolters said both of them ran in "the same little Noho lesbian social circle", and spent time together when she returned from her travels. Wolters had told Kerman she worked for an African drug lord, moving heroin around internationally, while Kerman was fascinated by her globe-trotting, adventurous lifestyle. Wolters asked Kerman if she wanted to take part in the operation. According to Wolters, she and Kerman became romantically involved after Kerman had gotten involved in the drug ring. In her interview with Vanity Fair, Wolters said that they were not girlfriends but friends with benefits, a notion with which Kerman disagreed, stating that they may have different perspectives about their time together and their relationship was complicated.

Kerman traveled with Wolters to exotic places, and made several trips carrying drug-funds for the cartel. Kerman realized she needed to walk away when Wolters asked her to transport heroin instead of money, after which she flew home and started a new life. Years later, Kerman was indicted and pled guilty to a money laundering charge, serving 13 months in a minimum-security prison in Danbury, Connecticut. Wolters was charged with conspiracy to import heroin, serving nearly six years in a Dublin, California prison, and nearly 14 years on parole. In the series, the issue of whether Vause implicated Chapman and the effect on their personal relationship is a major plot line of the first season. When Wolters and others involved in the drug ring were arrested by federal law enforcement, Wolters said that she, like the others, named everyone involved, including Kerman. Wolters also stated that, contrary to Kerman's implication in her memoir, she was not "singularly responsible for [her] downfall", as she was honest about what she did and getting involved was Kerman's decision. Although Kerman aimed to take responsibility for her actions, she said she still carried some resentment toward Wolters [for naming her], later making peace with her when they were held together in a Chicago facility. Unlike in the series, Wolters and Kerman did not get back together when they were reunited in prison.

According to Wolters, "the only [physical] similarity between myself and [Vause] is my black glasses." In her memoir, Kerman described Wolters as a "droll" woman, with a "drawling, wisecracking husky voice" and a "playful, watchful way of drawing a person out"; "when she paid you attention, it felt as if she were about to let you in on a private joke." Wolters' interview to Vanity Fair in April 2014 led to a book deal for her memoir. In 2015, HarperOne released Out of Orange, Wolters' memoir covering from the circumstances of her involvement in the drug trafficking ring and her relationship with Kerman, to her arrest, prison experience, and the present.

== Storylines ==
=== Season 1 ===
Vause is introduced in the first episode through flashbacks; she and Chapman were both involved in crimes involving drug money. At the end of the first episode, the audience sees that Vause and Chapman are both serving their sentences in the same prison, Litchfield Penitentiary. The two begin a romantic and sexual relationship in episode nine; they are also both involved in a dispute with another inmate, Tiffany "Pennsatucky" Doggett (Taryn Manning), who locks Vause in a dryer and then attempts to kill Chapman in the season finale. Vause was raised solely by her mother and, in the ninth episode 'Fucksgiving', Vause's father is seen to be an influence on her being involved in the drug cartel. When Chapman realises that Vause was the one who told authorities about her illegal drug activities, they break off their relationship. Vause then becomes sexually involved with another inmate, Nicky Nichols (Natasha Lyonne).

=== Season 2 ===
In the first episode, Vause promises Chapman that she will lie to protect her in the upcoming trial of her former boss Kubra Balik. She breaks this promise, however, and, after testifying against Balik, Vause manages to secure release from prison while Chapman remains incarcerated. After discovering that Balik was not imprisoned for his crimes, Vause fears for her life; she is also unable to leave her apartment due to the terms of her parole. She visits Chapman in prison and confides in her that she is scared; Chapman then gets Bloom to tell Vause's parole officer that Vause is breaking her parole, which lands her back in prison, where she is safe from Balik's retribution.

=== Season 3 ===
Vause appears in every episode of the third season. Chapman reports Vause to a parole officer and she is sent back to Litchfield prison; Chapman does eventually admit to doing this and the two begin frequently having hate sex. Chapman and Vause reconcile and officially resume their relationship, but become more distant again as the season progresses; Chapman becomes romantically involved with a new inmate, Stella Carlin (Ruby Rose), and this upsets Vause. Vause becomes increasingly concerned that Balik has sent someone into the prison to spy on her and bring her harm; she suspects that this person is Lolly Whitehill (Lori Petty) and attacks her in the toilet. It turns out that Whitehill is completely delusional and thinks that Vause is from the National Security Agency. In the season finale, Vause is confronted by Balik's henchman Aydin Bayat and her fate is left ambiguous.

=== Season 4 ===
In the first episode, Vause is seen being strangled by Aydin Bayat in the greenhouse, struggling for her life. She is saved by Lolly Whitehill who kicks him seemingly to death. However, Vause discovers in the night that he is just barely alive and is forced to suffocate him. Vause and Whitehill, planning on burying Aydin under the floorboards, discover Frieda Berlin, who has found the body in its temporary hiding place. Together Vause, Whitehill, and Berlin dismember and bury the body in the garden. As the season progresses, Whitehill becomes increasingly at risk of blowing their cover. Meanwhile, Vause is suffering from guilt and lives in constant fear of being caught. When Berlin suggests poisoning Whitehill, Vause confides in Galina "Red" Reznikov, hoping she will convince Berlin otherwise. In episode 8, Vause and Chapman bond again while getting high with Nichols in the garden, and their relationship once again progresses. Aydin's body is found in an unwarranted investigation by Desi Piscatella, resulting in Whitehill being sent to psych. Vause is never questioned about his murder. Vause's guilt manifests itself in notes left around the prison, revealing Aydin's name. Chapman convinces Vause to find them all, and prepares to burn them.

=== Season 5 ===
Following Poussey Washington's death and the subsequent prison riot, Alex and Piper (Taylor Schilling) help Linda (Beth Dover) disguise herself as an inmate for her protection. Alex help Piper and Taystee (Danielle Brooks) to strengthen their negotiating position by confiscating supplies sent by the governor. Piscatella captures Red, Piper, Alex and several other inmates and violently breaks Alex's arm, Piper with the help of other inmates overpowers Piscatella. Now evidence gathered by Gina (Abigail Savage) is released online cornering Piscatella. As the negotiations collapse a big proposal takes place, Piper proposes to Alex and she accepts, providing a sigh of releif before Alex joins Piper and several other inmates in hiding inside Frieda's bunker until CERT officers breach the bunker at the end of the riot.

=== Season 6 ===
Following the prison riot, Alex is transferred to Litchfield Maximum Security along with the other inmates who were found in Frieda's (Dale Soules) bunker. After initially fearing Alex has died during the riot, Piper is renuited with her in general population. Alex later becomes involved in Badison's smartphone smuggling operation, reluctantly hiding and concealing a cellphone during prison searches. As the two adjust to a life in maximum security, Piper proposes that they have a prison wedding to strengthen their relationship. Alex later agrees to work for Carol (Henny Russell) in exchange for Badison (Amanda Fuller) leaving Piper alone. As Piper's release from Litchfield approaches, she and Alex are married in prison ceremony officiated by Nicky Nichols.

=== Season 7 ===
Following Piper's release, both she and Alex try to maintain their relationship while Alex is still in prison. Alex has three years left of her sentence at this point. Due to a lack of intimacy and the obvious restrictions in their relationship, Alex encourages Piper to seek physical comfort from somebody else whilst she is away with the agreement that it is a temporary arrangement and to ensure she isn't lonely. Alex herself embarks in a physical relationship with CO McCullough who is blackmailing her to sell phone chargers to inmates. Prepon stated that Piper and Alex remain a couple at the end of the final season.

== Critical commentary ==
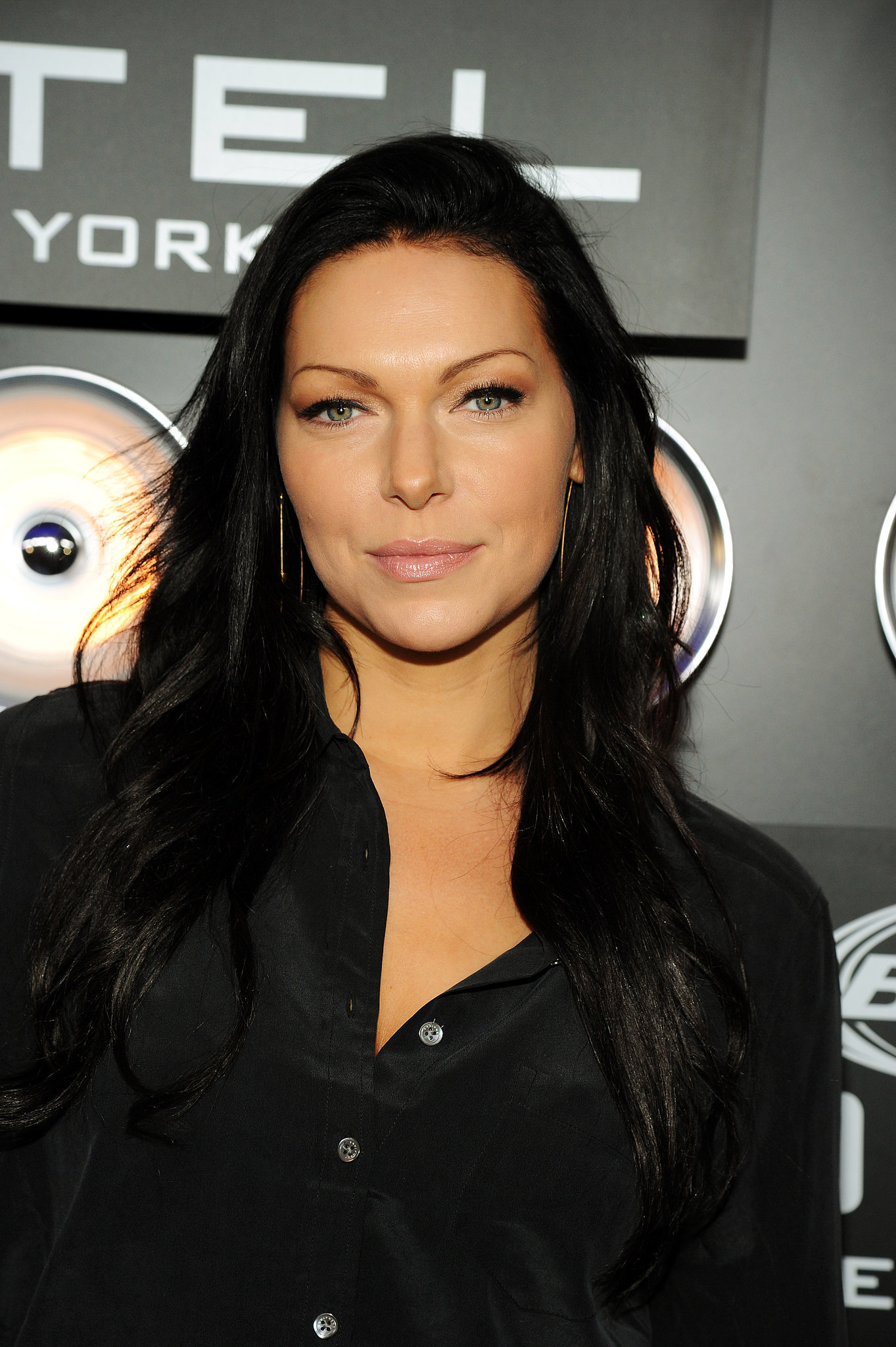
Laura Prepon (pictured) portrays Alex Vause in all seven seasons of Orange is the New Black.

Matthew Wolfson of Slant Magazine described Vause as intelligent, "with the instincts of a pragmatist, but without a strategy—a striking and emotionally direct person who may have closed off too many options for a workable future”. Dana Piccoli of AfterEllen said that Vause could be considered a villain in the first season as she is the reason Chapman is in prison, but she is also a "fascinating character that we want to understand and spend time with." Writing in The Daily Beast, Victoria Kezra similarly suggested that Vause is already a villain before the audience meets her, but the audience's "perception of her changes throughout the show", from a villainous figure to a sympathetic individual. Vause has "a great sense of humor about the whole situation" and is "pretty caring and insightful". TV Guide's Liz Raftery considered her a polarizing character, asking "is she a master manipulator or just misunderstood?". She proposed that Vause "seems to think of herself as a bad person but maybe she isn't, whereas [Chapman] is so convinced that she's a good person and is totally taken aback whenever anyone challenges that." Gerri Mahn of Den of Geek wrote that unlike Chapman, Vause "doesn’t harbor any illusions about who she is or what playing by the rules will get her". Vause sincerely loves Chapman, Mahn considered, and "continually came to her defense throughout season one", turning her down when she realized Chapman was using her as "someone to fall back on when Larry doesn’t come through".

Tim Surette of TV.com said that Vause's season one flashbacks fit the character well and "instantly gave us a story to be interested in", as they provided a more rounded view of Vause than Chapman's purview allowed. PopMatters's J.M Suarez described Vause as street-smart, "fearless" and "intimidating", contrary to Chapman who is "sheltered" and "often afraid and deferential", and it is "in highlighting these differences in prison, that their eventual backstories have even more impact." Greco Patti of Vulture complimented Prepon's "nuanced" portrayal, and noted that, despite Vause's illicit occupation and her role in Chapman's imprisonment, she is a woman who "came from nothing, who loved and lost, and who maybe got used", and seems more loyal and genuine in her love for Chapman. The A.V. Club's Myles McNutt considered Vause's relationship with her crimes to be "complicated"; he appreciates when the show does not filter character development solely through Chapman, deeming it "productive" when Vause had "a chance to open up to Nicky". Mahn said that, growing up poor, a free ride wasn't a possibility in Vause's world. She "left her scruples at the door" when she built her life on an alliance through her father's drug dealer, "worked hard, gambled big, and lost everything". McNutt said Vause's conflict with Doggett, who saw her as "coming from privilege", is a trigger for Vause's "past struggles with class hierarchies". Her despondency regarding her absent father "could either gain [her] new perspective and put her life on the right track or [she could] try to fill the absence as quickly as possible", the latter of which she chose. Autostraddle posited that Vause hates and fears vulnerability, and is a complicated character; the writer found her sexual threat to Doggett "troubling", but she empathized with Vause as a young girl "who would do anything for the life she was cheated out of".

In Den of Geek, Chris Longo wrote that, as the first season played out, Vause "was vilified, then the tables turned when she won Piper’s friendship, then they turned upside down during their inevitable hookup. Alex, for all the bad she’s done, seems like a woman who stays true to her word." Longo praised Prepon's performance, and hoped the series progressed Vause's storylines. The Guardian's Tom Meltzer wrote that Prepon plays Chapman's "jilted" former lover "with subtlety and unabashed smoulder". In his review of the first season, Matthew Gilbert of The Boston Globe described pre-prison Vause as "icy cool", and called Prepon a "revelation" in the role. David Hiltbrand wrote in The Philadelphia Inquirer that Prepon plays the character with "real vigor". Maureen Ryan of HuffPost also praised Prepon's portrayal, commenting that "underneath the cool-girl exterior is a whole lot of pain and loneliness, and Prepon has done a wonderful job of subtly bringing those notes forward." Chris Jancelewicz of The Huffington Post Canada deemed Vause "charismatic", adding that Prepon "excels as the bad girl influence".

Kristi Turnquist of The Oregonian said that although Vause was only in a few episodes of the second season, she "turns up to devastating effect early on". In a review of the season two premiere, Horatia Harrod of The Daily Telegraph felt that Vause is dedicated to self-preservation and "another betrayal" of Chapman "reached new depths", thus she found it "puzzling" that Vause's bad-girl routine "seems to have won her a fan following, while [Chapman] is reviled." Kevin Fallon of The Daily Beast noted that there is something about Vause that "convinces [Chapman] to throw her lifelong caution to the wind." Kate Zernike of The New York Times said that Vause is "calculating", and "there’s something black cat-like about [her] – she slips into the frame and you know things are about to go bad, or at least, get interesting." Chris Harvey of The Daily Telegraph called Prepon's portrayal "unforgettable" and wrote that Vause's wicked attitude and bespectacled look have made the character a "cult favourite". The Wall Street Journal's Candace Jackson said that Prepon is "excellent in this role as ever", walking a "believable line between flirtation and manipulation". Spencer Kornhaber of The Atlantic said Vause was "correct [...] when she diagnosed how inconsistent Chapman's worldview is", and her "return, in letter and in flashback, offers another lesson in moral relativity and personal transformation." Danielle Henderson remarked in Vulture that Vause "has balls" for sending Chapman letters after the incident in the season two premiere. In her review of the season's finale, Zernike wrote that although Vause may not be the "typical re-entering felon", her speech to Chapman about needing to violate her probation, flee, and likely return to her former felonious life "does raise some good points" regarding issues with the prison system.

The Advocate's Nico Lang described Vause as a notably popular femme fatale character, whom the show brought back after the second season "despite the fact that the real-life character was barely in [Kerman's memoir] at all". Charlotte Richardson Andrews wrote in Sight & Sound that Vause is one of the show's "believable and investment-worthy" queer characters, and the "tangled, romantic dance that [she and Chapman] do is compelling, nuanced and sexy where, in other hands, it might have felt exploitative". In Digital Spy, Emma Dibdin described a "power shift" in the third season between Vause and Chapman and how this positively impacts both characters; "[their] power dynamic is so dramatically shifted that everything about them feels fresh. [Vause] is more vulnerable than we've ever seen her, utterly shattered to find herself back in jail." Observer's Orly Greenberg said Vause returns to prison "completely absent of her flashing eyes and snarky confidence, instead relying on [Chapman] as an almost maternal figure" as Chapman leads Vause to believe her return is a product of "the system", rather than Chapman's own doing. Emily Ambash of CutPrintFilm wrote that Vause is "emotionally broken" when she reenters prison; "embarrassed and ashamed of her own choices" and her failure in handling her brief freedom. Vause and Chapman's dynamic in the third season feels "fresh", as they confront their issues in the present without passive aggressiveness and without a focus on the past, and they are forced to "question their faith not just in each other but also in themselves when dealing with each other." Michael Hindle of Comingsoon.net said that while "one has always had power over the other in some form or another, now [they] are more or less on an even playing field". Joshua Alston of The A.V. Club felt that Vause's return to prison "lands with a surprisingly soft impact". The character Stella "appears right on time to drive a wedge between [Chapman and Vause] just as a functional relationship becomes possible", and the show "manages to make [the looming love triangle] feel consequential."

In her review of the third season, Jessica Kiang of Indiewire wrote that Vause and Chapman "come spectacularly together but find, again with some insight, that they’re a couple whose fire can burn on hate much easier than on routine." Libby Hill argued in her New York Times review of the second episode, that their on-off relationship has become "toxic", and they have "little meaningful interaction" with other characters while they are entangled in their tempestuous dynamic, making them "emotionally unavailable" to other characters and to the audience. Hill hopes Vause is more integrated into "Litchfield's culture" and has more humanizing interactions with other characters as she did with Nicky in the first season. The A.V. Club's Myles McNutt said that although he understands the significance of their intertwined story playing out in prison, their present storyline compels them to exist "independently of anything around them", removing them from ordinary life in the prison community. Perri Nemiroff of Collider felt that it was "an unexpected and unearned twist" that Vause would reconnect with Chapman (through "hate sex") soon after finding out Chapman was responsible for her being back in prison. Their role play in the prison's drama class, however, "balances the palpable hostility with humor and heart, making the scene wildly entertaining, but also ensuring that the moment really means something, too." In Entertainment Weekly, Jonathan Dornbush wrote that Vause and Chapman engaging in angry sex after Chapman's hand in taking away her freedom is "another shift in their power dynamic". Vause is "still in jail, still lost her life on the outside, and she may be in more danger now than ever, but at least she can control something." Ambash said that the drama class improv exercise is necessary as it compels Vause and Chapman "to consider their real-life situation" and "find a sort of reconciliation". Keith Nelson Jr. of Digital Trends found Vause's speech to a correctional officer about the malleable and interpretive nature of morality to be frank "societal commentary". Sarah Bredeman of FanSided opined that the commentary Vause made to Rogers is "one of the best 'we are not your salvation, you can’t save us, and this ain't no Dead Poet’s Society kinda situation' speeches", and "it really hits home a good point."

Kelly Lawler in USA Today suggested that, as opposed to how Chapman painted her, Vause's legitimate concerns over the danger she is in makes her one of the most rational individuals on the show. Perri Nemiroff of Collider said that Vause's season three flashbacks of her witnessing what her drug cartel boss is capable of made her present situation "far more dynamic and tense", giving her anxiety full credibility. Alan Sepinwall of Uproxx felt that the character's flashback, like Nicky's in an earlier episode, was "covering familiar territory solely to support prominent stories each was getting in the present", but at least both flashbacks were "somber" enough to make them an "interesting contrast" to the concurrent comedic moments. In his review of the eleventh episode, McNutt wrote that Vause's "isolation is turned around, and what once felt like a failure of the show's writing becomes a logical character choice." He began "respecting Vause's struggle to embrace her situation — it may not have served the season to this point," McNutt said, "but it serves here as a productive counterpoint to [Chapman]". Ambash said Vause and Chapman's absence from the season's final group scenes – as Vause is trapped with the man sent to kill her, and Chapman is off tattooing herself in the chapel – symbolizes their heightened distrust in others and the prison system itself. "For [Vause], unlike [Chapman], this wasn't her choice. With safety stripped from her, and ties of trust cut by others, it's no surprise [Vause] is kept away now from the freedom of the lake." Vause's season three storyline "highlights real issues regarding prisoners' safety", Ambash noted, "especially when no real background checks are performed on new, untrained officers, who end up with easy access to inmates". Moreover, "it serves as a reminder that [Vause and Chapman] have basically switched roles". Lauren Chval of Chicago Tribune said that Vause "knows who she is and what she wants", trusts her instincts and has "never flipped on her feelings for Chapman". Chval praised Prepon in the role, and felt that Vause is "always more interesting in her scenes without Chapman". Perri Nemiroff of Collider said Prepon has been successful "taking Alex from a strong inmate you don’t want to mess with to someone super vulnerable who's fearing for her life." Rick Porter of The Hollywood Reporter praised Prepon's performance as Vause encounters the man sent to kill her, writing, "Prepon sells the heck of out Alex's disbelief and fear in the scene."

The aftermath of Vause's storyline has a sweeping effect throughout the fourth season according to critics. In Harper's Bazaar, Emma Dibdin wrote that Vause having to kill, dismember, and bury her would-be murderer was "the beginning of a season that saw almost every one of our beloved inmates go through her darkest hour yet." According to Kayla Kumari Upadhyaya of Autostraddle, Vause and Lolly's "greenhouse murder" became one of the "most suspenseful through lines" of the season. Isabel Mohan wrote in The Daily Telegraph that Vause's confidence from previous seasons is gone as she has become "a nervous wreck" and "her scenes are among the most macabre" of the season. The Atlantic's Spencer Kornhaber considered Vause's "saga" to be some of series' "darkest scenes yet." Several themes explored in the season are evoked in Vause's storyline. Jen Chaney of Vulture noted that the "murky issues surrounding blame" are prompted from the outset of the season, as both Vause and Lolly become responsible for the homicide of the hit man, "yet neither of them are true 'murderers' in that both were motivated by self-defense. It’s a case of both women doing wrong and neither of them doing wrong." Kornhaber of The Atlantic said that Vause's acknowledgement that her attacker "was a person", echoed "a mantra that’s surfaced in various forms across the season". Myles McNutt of The A.V. Club wrote, "the season has been consumed by the idea of guilt" and it manifests on Vause and Chapman's attitudes and behavior; in a latter episode, they decide "they aren’t willing to do anything that would add to their sense of guilt". Vulture's Kathryn VanArendonk observed the notion that "regret is real, but time only moves in one direction" reflected on Vause and Chapman's conversation about changing the past, and the need to claim selfhood in Vause wanting to acknowledge the humanity of her attacker.

Myles McNutt wrote that Vause being compelled to finish killing the man, instead of letting him die by Lolly's deed, "makes it more visceral, and creates an internalized event to frame her understanding of her status as a 'criminal' in the season to follow." Hannah Shaw-Williams of Screen Rant regarded Vause taking the life of her attacker as "one of the premiere’s most emotionally powerful scenes, which reveals that despite her background as a hard-as-nails heroin dealer, Vause has never actually had to kill anyone before." In Paste magazine, Matt Brennan commended "the quiet, tearful moment in which Vause [...] decides to end his life." Her "remorse for this choice, and for all the choices that led to it, is palpable," Brennan noted, "even if his death amounts to self-defense." Emma Dibdin wrote in Digital Spy that while Vause's on-off lover Chapman "[insists] she's a force to be reckoned with", Vause "goes through the real moral transformation, pushed to brutal extremes by the hitman sent to kill her." Kayla Kumari Upadhyaya of Autostraddle considered the scenes of Vause helping Lolly reconcile her thoughts and emotions "a cutting and intimate look at self-care and coping mechanisms." The Atlantic's Spencer Kornhaber similarly reviewed Vause's "counseling" of Lolly, finding it a "succinct and touching glimpse at post-traumatic coping". McNutt opined in The A.V. Club that the circumstances of Lolly's paranoia, the lack of evidence that the correctional officer was a hit man, the lack of trust in a broken system, and the difficulty in explaining away Vause and Lolly's actions in the homicide, meant that Lolly being taken away was "tragic" but ultimately "probably the best case scenario" when someone would have to be held responsible.

Autostraddle's Kayla Kumari Upadhyaya considered Vause's decision to not tell Chapman what she has gone through an "emotionally significant" moment for the character; she is not on good terms with Chapman, but she also does not want Chapman to be implicated by it. Apart from the homicide being an overarching plot, Upadhyaya stated it also had "long-term emotional significance" for Vause. Ed Power of The Telegraph found it "wrenching" to see Vause "haunted by doubt and guilt", praising the show for "peeling back the layers, showing a new side to a person we thought we already knew", and the "disquiet and disbelief that flashed across Vause's face" in response to Chapman in the crack scene. Alan Sepinwall of Uproxx wrote that Vause and Chapman needing to be under the influence of drugs "to finally be honest with each other about all their recent tragedies seemed about right for a relationship that's always thrived on a high level of drama." In her review of the season's ninth episode, Pilot Viruet of Decider remarked that it is "good to see [Vause and Chapman] getting along and not plagued by relationship dramatics." In his review of the season's finale, McNutt wrote that he found Vause "reacting to death by thinking about the hitman's humanity rang true to her arc". Prepon received praise for her performance in the fourth season. Dana Schwartzof of The Observer lauded Prepon in the premiere episode, writing that her performance should be up for Emmy consideration. Kayla Kumari Upadhyaya of Autostraddle wrote that Prepon is "giving her best performance to date on the show, effectively capturing the turmoil of Alex’s mind and the psychological toll of this secret."

Prepon won the Satellite Award for Best Supporting Actress – Series, Miniseries or Television Film at the 18th Satellite Awards for her performance as Vause.

== See also ==
- List of Orange Is the New Black characters
