= Orange Is the New Black season 1 =

Orange Is the New Black
- Season 1
- Promotional poster
- Starring: Taylor Schilling; Laura Prepon; Michael Harney; Michelle Hurst; Kate Mulgrew; Jason Biggs
- No. of episodes: 13

Release
- Original network: Netflix
- Original release: July 11, 2013

Season chronology
- Next → Season 2

The first season of the American comedy-drama television series Orange Is the New Black premiered on Netflix on July 11, 2013, at 12:00 am PST in multiple countries. It consists of thirteen episodes, each between 51 and 60 minutes. The series is based on Piper Kerman's memoir, Orange Is the New Black: My Year in a Women's Prison (2010), about her experiences at FCI Danbury, a minimum-security federal prison. Created and adapted for television by Jenji Kohan. In July 2011, Netflix was in negotiations with Lionsgate for a 13-episode TV adaptation of Kerman's memoirs. The series began filming in the old Rockland Children's Psychiatric Center in Rockland County, New York, on March 7, 2013. The title sequence features photos of real former female prisoners including Kerman herself.

The series revolves around Piper Chapman (Taylor Schilling), a woman in her 30s living in New York City who is sentenced to 15 months in Litchfield Penitentiary, a minimum-security women's federal prison (initially operated by the "Federal Department of Corrections," a fictional version of the Federal Bureau of Prisons, and later acquired by Management & Correction Corporation (MCC), a private prison company) in upstate New York. Piper had been convicted of transporting a suitcase full of drug money for her then-girlfriend Alex Vause (Laura Prepon), an international drug smuggler.

Orange Is the New Black received critical acclaim. The series received numerous accolades including but not limited to: Satellite Award for Best Television Series – Musical or Comedy and Critics' Choice Television Award for Best Comedy Series. Also was nominated for a Writers Guild of America Award for Television: Comedy Series, Writers Guild of America Award for Television: New Series and NAACP Image Award for Outstanding Writing in a Dramatic Series. Taylor Schilling was nominated for a Golden Globe Award for Best Actress – Television Series Drama. For the 66th Primetime Emmy Awards, the series was honored with 12 nominations, winning Outstanding Casting for a Comedy Series, Outstanding Single-Camera Picture Editing for a Comedy Series and Primetime Emmy Award for Outstanding Guest Actress in a Comedy Series (Uzo Aduba).

== Plot ==
Piper Chapman (Taylor Schilling) is sentenced to fifteen months at Litchfield Penitentiary, a women's prison, for a drug-related crime she committed ten years earlier. Leaving behind her supportive fiancé, Larry (Jason Biggs), Piper begins her term at Litchfield and meets several inmates including Red (Kate Mulgrew), the powerful matriarch of the prison kitchen; Nicky Nichols (Natasha Lyonne), a former heroin addict whom Piper befriends; Miss Claudette (Michelle Hurst), Piper's stern roommate; and Suzanne "Crazy Eyes" Warren (Uzo Aduba), a mentally unstable inmate who makes a romantic move on Piper. Piper also meets Sam Healy (Michael J. Harney), her homophobic counselor who deals with many of the inmates' problems. Struggling to adjust to the dynamics of the prison, Piper's problems are further compounded when she discovers that her former lover, Alex Vause (Laura Prepon), is in the same prison as her. The first season mainly focuses on Piper's experiences in prison and her growing relationship with Alex, while also providing the backstories of several inmates at Litchfield.

== Cast and characters ==
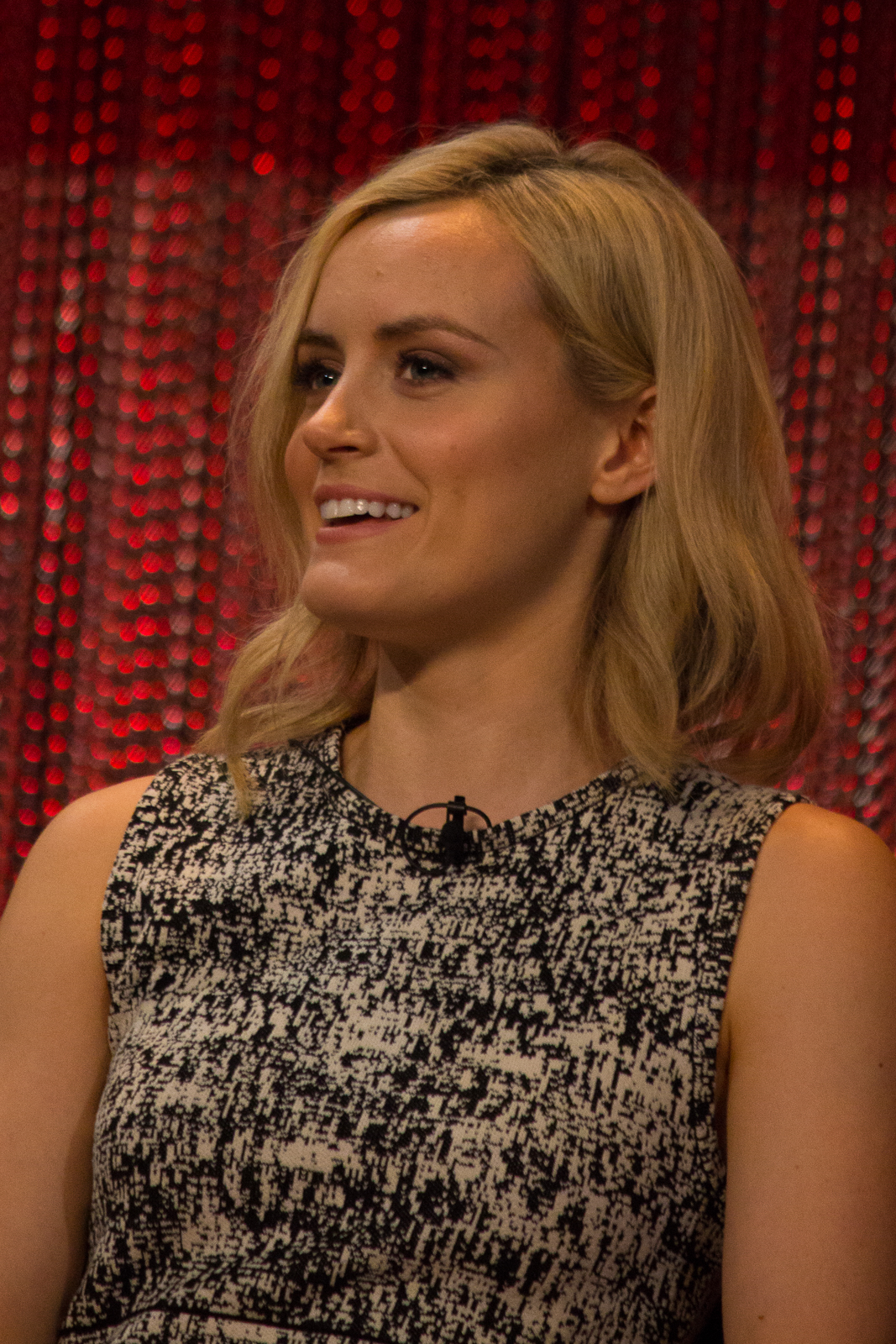
Taylor Schilling

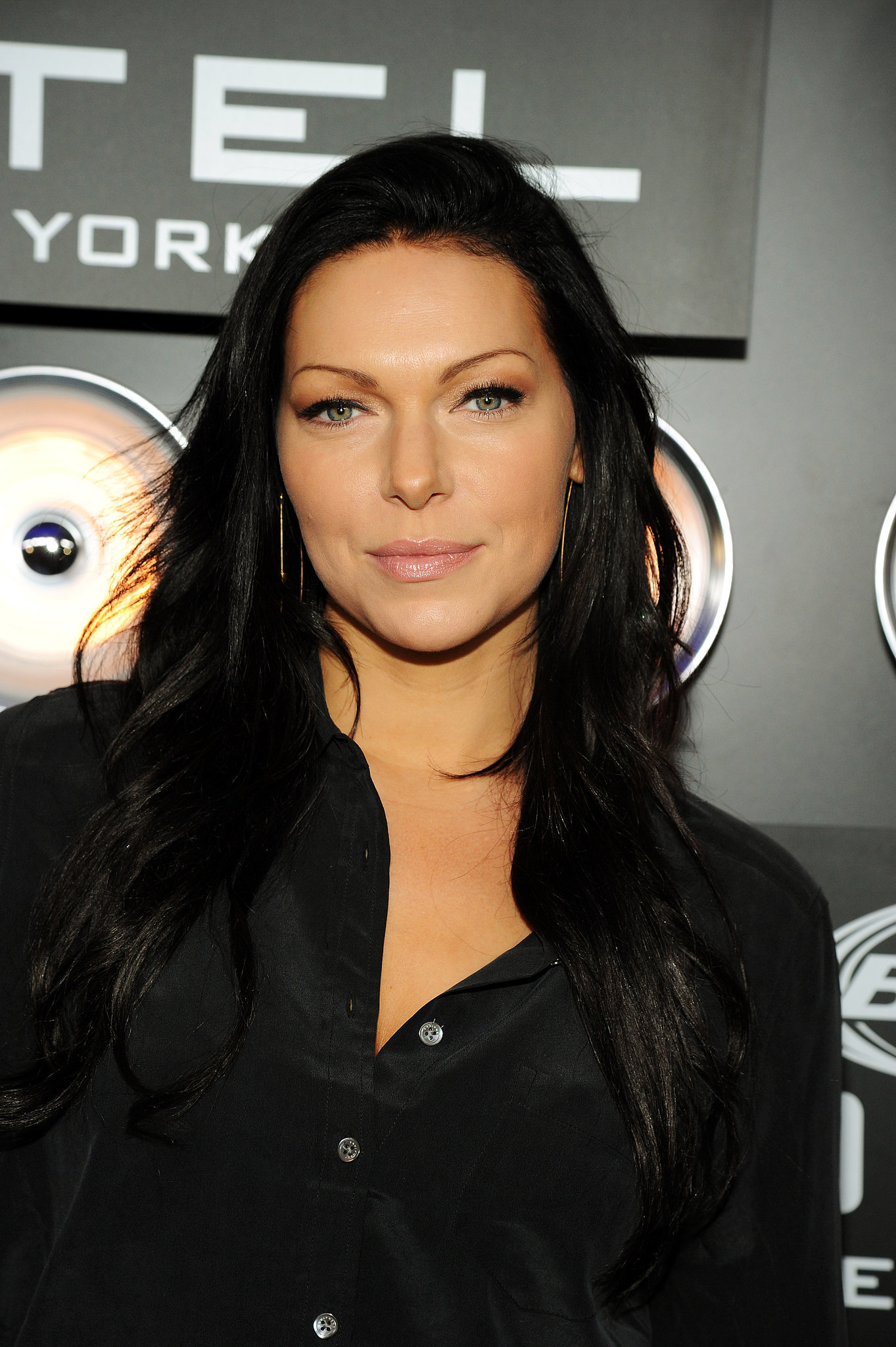
Laura Prepon

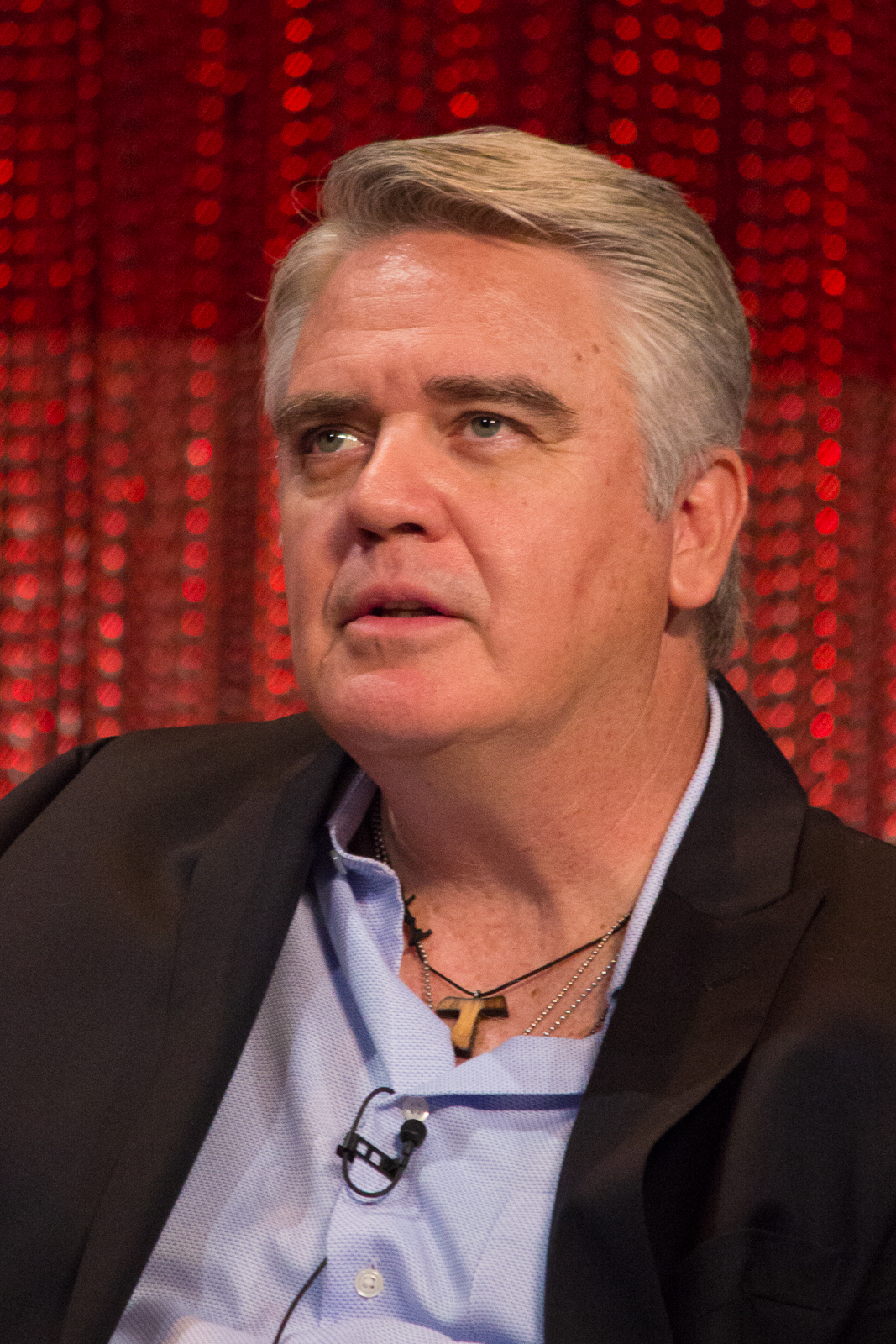
Michael Harney

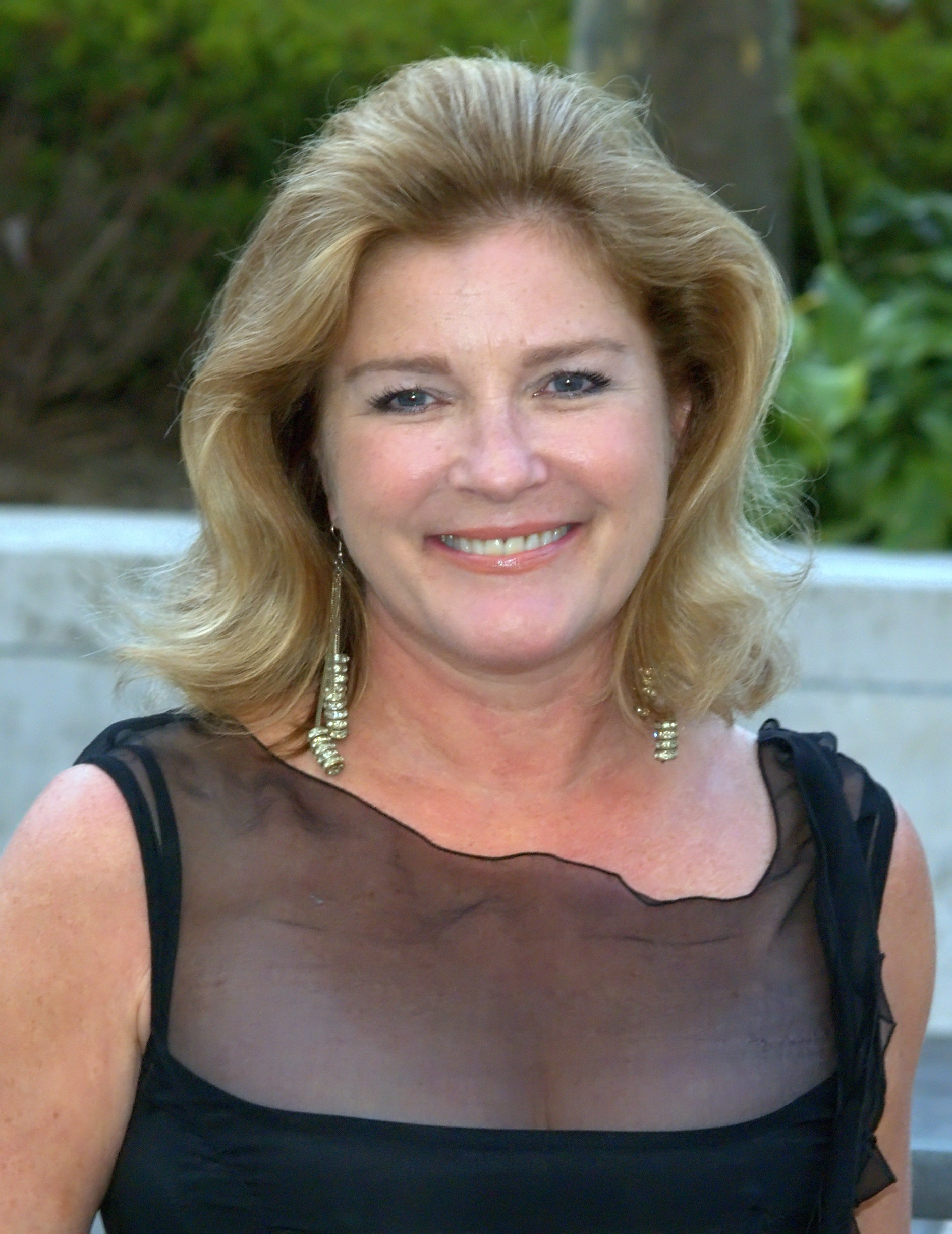
Kate Mulgrew

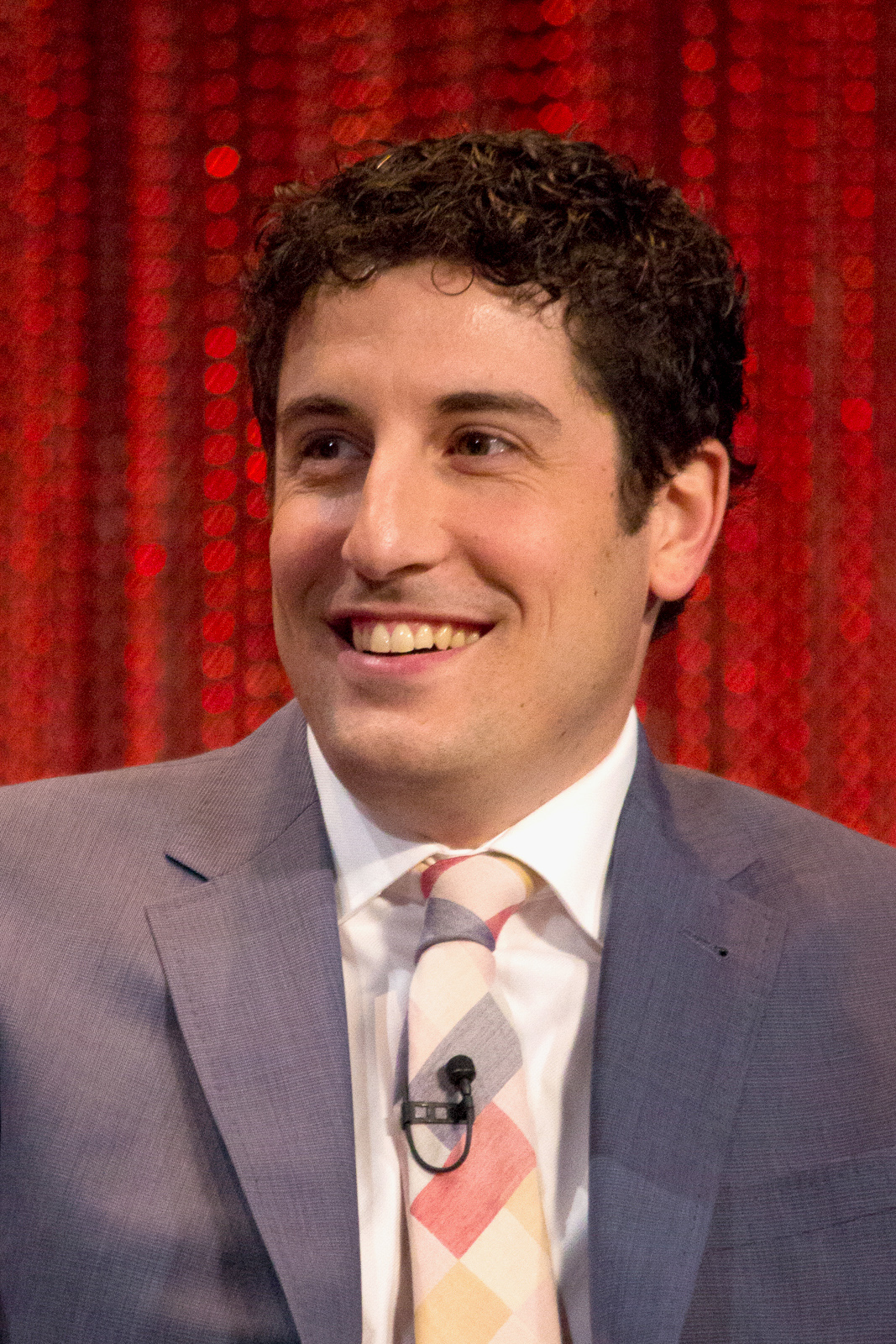
Jason Biggs

=== Main cast ===
- Taylor Schilling as Piper Chapman, inmate
- Laura Prepon as Alex Vause, inmate
- Michael Harney as Sam Healy, correctional officer
- Michelle Hurst as Miss Claudette Pelage, inmate
- Kate Mulgrew as Galina "Red" Reznikov, inmate
- Jason Biggs as Larry Bloom, Piper's fiancé

=== Recurring cast ===
==== Inmates ====
- Uzo Aduba as Suzanne "Crazy Eyes" Warren
- Danielle Brooks as Tasha "Taystee" Jefferson
- Natasha Lyonne as Nicky Nichols
- Taryn Manning as Tiffany "Pennsatucky" Doggett
- Selenis Leyva as Gloria Mendoza
- Adrienne C. Moore as Cindy "Black Cindy" Hayes
- Dascha Polanco as Dayanara "Daya" Diaz
- Yael Stone as Lorna Morello
- Samira Wiley as Poussey Washington
- Jackie Cruz as Marisol "Flaca" Gonzales
- Lea DeLaria as Carrie "Big Boo" Black
- Elizabeth Rodriguez as Aleida Diaz
- Jessica Pimentel as Maria Ruiz
- Laverne Cox as Sophia Burset
- Annie Golden as Norma Romano
- Laura Gómez as Blanca Flores
- Diane Guerrero as Maritza Ramos
- Vicky Jeudy as Janae Watson
- Julie Lake as Angie Rice
- Emma Myles as Leanne Taylor
- Abigail Savage as Gina Murphy
- Constance Shulman as Erica "Yoga" Jones
- Lori Tan Chinn as Mei Chang
- Tamara Torres as Emily Germann
- Lin Tucci as Anita DeMarco
- Beth Fowler as Sister Jane Ingalls
- Barbara Rosenblat as Rosa "Miss Rosa" Cisneros
- Madeline Brewer as Tricia Miller

==== Staff ====
- Nick Sandow as Joe Caputo
- Catherine Curtin as Wanda Bell
- Joel Marsh Garland as Scott O'Neill
- Matt Peters as Joel Luschek
- Alysia Reiner as Natalie "Fig" Figueroa
- Brendan Burke as Wade Donaldson
- Lolita Foster as Eliqua Maxwell
- Matt McGorry as John Bennett
- Pablo Schreiber as George "Pornstache" Mendez
- Lauren Lapkus as Susan Fischer

==== Others ====
- Michael Chernus as Cal Chapman
- Tanya Wright as Crystal Burset
- Tracee Chimo as Neri Feldman
- Berto Colon as Cesar
- Deborah Rush as Carol Chapman
- Maria Dizzia as Polly Harper

== Episodes ==
No. overall	No. in season	Title	Directed by	Written by	Featured character(s)	Original release date
1	1	"I Wasn't Ready"	Michael Trim	Liz Friedman & Jenji Kohan	Piper	July 11, 2013
Sentenced to 15 months for a crime she committed 10 years earlier, Piper Chapman leaves her supportive fiancé Larry for her new home: Litchfield Penitentiary, a women's prison. Her homophobic counselor, Sam Healy, empathizes with her and gently gives her tips to survive. Piper grapples with the racial dynamics of prison life and learns some of the rules. She befriends some of the inmates, including Nicky Nichols, a recovering heroin addict. Piper later offends Red, the powerful matriarch of the prison kitchen, who responds by serving Piper a bloody tampon. Piper is then shocked to discover that Alex Vause, her former lover who recruited her into carrying drug money, is in the same prison. Meanwhile, new inmate Daya Diaz is greeted by her mother Aleida, who is also incarcerated, with a slap to the face. Flashback: Flashbacks depict the particulars of Piper's crime, Piper telling her family about her crime, and Larry's marriage proposal.
2	2	"Tit Punch"	Uta Briesewitz	Marco Ramirez	Red & Piper	July 11, 2013
After insulting Red's food, Piper is starved out by the kitchen staff. She struggles to offer up an acceptable apology to Red. Alex tries to give Piper a piece of cornbread, but Piper rejects it. With help from fellow inmate, Suzanne "Crazy Eyes" Warren, Piper manages to prepare a medicated lotion for Red's back problems; Red appreciates the effort and stops starving Piper. Suzanne later makes a romantic move on Piper. Meanwhile, the kitchen freezer is irreparably damaged, and Red manipulates Healy into buying a new one. Daya forms a secret friendship with Bennett, a friendly correctional officer. Flashback: Red attempts to befriend the wives of well-connected Russian businessmen in Brooklyn. Unfortunately, she tells an insulting joke that alienates them. During a confrontation, Red punctures one of the wives' breast implants. As compensation, Red's husband agrees to hold secret packages for the businessmen.
3	3	"Lesbian Request Denied"	Jodie Foster	Sian Heder	Sophia & Piper	July 11, 2013
Piper's best friend Polly takes more authority over their soap-making business. Piper firmly rejects Suzanne's romantic advances after Suzanne submits a request to bunk with her. Transgender inmate Sophia Burset has her dose of exogenous estrogen reduced in response to budget cuts. Sophia asks her wife, Crystal, to smuggle hormone pills into the prison; Crystal flatly refuses, asking her "How fucking selfish can you be?" Piper moves into the cube of Miss Claudette, a stern inmate with high expectations for cleanliness and privacy. Miss Claudette's code of conduct is violated when Suzanne vengefully urinates on the floor of their space. Flashback: Sophia's wife and child struggle to adjust to Sophia's gender transition, and Sophia is arrested after committing credit card fraud to finance her gender reassignment surgery.
4	4	"Imaginary Enemies"	Michael Trim	Gary Lennon	Miss Claudette	July 11, 2013
Healy assigns Piper a work assignment at the electrical shop. After Piper loses a screwdriver, the prison staff conducts an intense search before it is used as a weapon. A skeezy correctional officer, George Mendez, molests Piper during the search. When Piper returns to her cube with the screwdriver, it places more strain on her relationship with Claudette. Meanwhile, Tricia Miller schemes to prevent her girlfriend Mercy's release by planting drugs in her bunk, but Claudette convinces Tricia not to ruin Mercy's chance of freedom. Healy informs Claudette that there is interest in reopening her case. Claudette initially declines, but agrees to have her case reopened after receiving a letter from her old friend Baptiste. Flashback: Miss Claudette ran an illegal housekeeping company until she murdered a man who sexually assaulted one of her employees.
5	5	"The Chickening"	Andrew McCarthy	Nick Jones	Aleida & Daya	July 11, 2013
While relaxing in the exercise yard, Piper sees a chicken. When she mentions it in passing, Red recounts her dream of cooking a proper chicken and offers a gift to the person who catches the chicken. Larry discovers that Alex gave Piper's name to the feds. To keep Piper focused on life beyond prison, Larry lies to her. Polly arranges for Piper to take a business call, but Piper skips it to chase the chicken. Lorna Morello ends her sexual relationship with Nicky. Sophia asks Sister Ingalls for estrogen pills, but Sister Ingalls refuses. At the chapel, the overloaded ceiling collapses from a heavy cross that Pennsatucky had tried to hang. The prisoners are forced to clean up and repair the damage. Miss Claudette starts researching her legal appeal. Bennett and Daya pass notes to each other; Aleida advises her daughter to date another guard who can do her favors. Flashback: Aleida runs a drug ring with her boyfriend, César, while the family struggles financially. After Aleida goes to prison, Daya starts dating César and runs the drug ring.
6	6	"WAC Pack"	Michael Trim	Lauren Morelli	Nicky & Piper	July 11, 2013
Piper starts to view Alex fondly, now believing that she didn't name her. Larry agrees to write an article about Piper's term in prison. Healy is tired of dealing with the inmate's problems and announces elections for the women's advisory council. Red encourages Morello to run for WAC, dismaying Nicky, who believed that she was Red's second-in-command. Healy encourages Piper to run for WAC, but when she refuses, Healy places her on the council anyway. The guards start searching for a missing mobile phone; Piper finds it hidden in the wall of the bathroom. The increased contraband searches threatens Mendez's drug operation. A friendly CO, Susan Fischer, gets assigned to Litchfield. Daya performs oral sex on Bennett for the first time, during which she discovers that he has a prosthetic leg. Flashback: Flashbacks depict the friction between Nicky and her biological mother, and how Red helped Nicky deal with her drug problem.
7	7	"Blood Donut"	Matthew Penn	Sara Hess	Janae	July 11, 2013
Janae Watson is released from the SHU after arguing with the guards during the screwdriver incident. Janae concludes that it was Piper who misplaced the screwdriver; Piper confesses, but points out that Janae was initially sent to the SHU for arguing with the guards. Piper tries to make nice with Alex. Taystee anticipates her upcoming disciplinary board hearing. Mendez pressures Red into smuggling drugs into the prison, but she refuses. Pennsatucky, who was hoping to use the WAC election to obtain false teeth, is infuriated by Piper's appointment to WAC. Piper hands Healy the missing phone in exchange for getting the prison's running track reopened. When Healy does not go through with the plan, Piper manipulates Fischer into reopening the running track, which pleases Janae. Flashback: Janae was a gifted track star with a college scholarship, but she always struggled to fit in. After flirting with a sketchy man at a party, Janae helps the man rob a convenience store. They are separated as they escape; she is caught by the police, but he is not.
8	8	"Moscow Mule"	Phil Abraham	Marco Ramirez	Red	July 11, 2013
The flu bug circulates through the prison. Larry's article is printed. While Piper is happy about the article, she is upset that most of the information is inaccurate. Healy reads the article and begins acting coldly towards Piper upon discovering her history with Alex. Piper and Alex flirt and reminisce while they try to fix a dryer. Pennsatucky locks Alex into the dryer as revenge. Polly gives birth. When Tricia goes into drug withdrawal, prison administrator Joe Caputo orders Mendez to investigate how the drugs entered the prison. Over Nicky's objection, Red cuts off Tricia, who is subsequently sent to SHU. Angry at Red for cutting off Tricia, Nicky informs Mendez that Red uses Neptune's Produce, a vendor affiliated with the Russian bosses from Red's background, to smuggle contraband into the prison. Taystee is granted parole. Daya discovers that she is pregnant, and Bennett is the father. Flashback: Red gives the Russian bosses a good business idea, which begins her climb up the organized crime ladder.
9	9	"Fucksgiving"	Michael Trim	Sian Heder	Alex	July 11, 2013
Mendez uses Red's smuggling connections to move drugs into the prison. When Red flushes them down the toilet, Mendez issues Red a death threat and urinates into the Thanksgiving gravy. Pennsatucky and Alex clash over their views on homosexuality and religion. During Taystee's release party, Piper and Alex share a sexually charged dance; Pennsatucky snitches on them for "lesbianing together," after which Healy sends Chapman to SHU. Piper is enraged that Healy is punishing her, and she struggles to deal with the isolation. Larry meets Maury Kind, an NPR personality. Crystal informs Sophia that she has become romantically interested in her pastor. With Sister Ingalls's encouragement, Sophia gives Crystal her blessing. Daya agrees to keep her baby. Taystee gets released but finds that her support network is missing. Caputo orders Healy to release Piper from SHU when it becomes clear that her transfer was unjustified. Healy calls Larry, informing him about Piper and Alex's sexual relationship. Upon returning to camp, Piper has sex with Alex. Flashback: Flashbacks depict Alex being bullied for her low socioeconomic standing, her relationship with her mother, and her first contact with her washed-up rock star father. The flashbacks also show her beginning with the drug cartel.
10	10	"Bora Bora Bora"	Andrew McCarthy	Nick Jones	Piper & Tricia	July 11, 2013
Piper is unable to contact Larry, though she finds out from her brother Cal that Larry had landed an NPR radio interview. Bennett learns of Daya's pregnancy and is concerned that the system will discover their relationship, which could result in disciplinary action for both. A scared straight program arrives at the prison; the inmates attempt to intimidate the visiting juvenile delinquents, but they have difficulty intimidating Dina, a young paraplegic "gangster". Piper succeeds by telling Dina the scariest part of prison is coming face-to-face with who you really are. Pennsatucky starts a faith healing crusade that quickly ends when she forcefully removes Dina from her wheelchair; Pennsatucky had been tricked by Piper into "healing" Dina. Miss Claudette reunites with Baptiste. Tricia returns from SHU and struggles to make amends with Red. Mendez manipulates Tricia into selling his drugs. Upon clocking Tricia's state, Mendez locks her in a closet to prevent her from revealing the drugs. When he returns, Mendez discovers Tricia had taken all the drugs, overdosed, and died. He manipulates the scene to make it look as if Tricia had hung herself. Nicky and Red blame themselves for Tricia's death and they both resolve to bring Mendez down. Flashback: Flashbacks reveal Piper meeting Larry. Tricia survives life on the streets of New York City by shoplifting; she keeps a list of what she steals so she can pay everyone back.
11	11	"Tall Men with Feelings"	Constantine Makris	Lauren Morelli	Piper & Alex	July 11, 2013
While the prison officials cover up Tricia's death, the inmates organize an informal memorial for her. Tricia's death affects Mendez, and he vents over drinks with Bennett. Aleida, Daya and Red scheme to cover up Daya's pregnancy; Daya will have sex with Mendez, which will then deflect suspicions once her pregnancy becomes apparent. During their encounter, however, Mendez uses a condom. After Piper learns that psych is worse than SHU, she successfully petitions Caputo to have Pennsatucky returned to general population; Piper's bravery brings Alex closer to her. Miss Claudette and Baptiste anticipate her potential release. Piper and several other inmates listen to Larry's NPR interview; Larry's comments are hurtful towards Suzanne and Miss Claudette, and his comments regarding fidelity convinces Piper that he knows about her relationship with Alex. Piper finally contacts Larry and confesses her infidelity. Larry reveals that Healy had told him that she was put in the SHU for "lesbian activity." Piper admits that she loves Alex, which Larry sees as a deep betrayal; Larry then tells Piper that Alex did name her, thereby admitting that he lied earlier, and tells Piper than he needs time away from her. Flashback: Flashbacks depict the fight and breakup between Piper and Alex following the death of Alex's mother.
12	12	"Fool Me Once"	Andrew McCarthy	Sara Hess	Pennsatucky	July 11, 2013
Caputo catches Mendez having sex with Daya. To avoid a rape investigation, Mendez is put on unpaid leave. Daya tells Bennett about her plot, though he is displeased about the framing. Mendez tells Bennett about Red's smuggling operation; Bennett informs Caputo. Piper makes up with Miss Claudette, who is hopeful for the results of her hearing; however, her appeal is denied. Returning to camp, Claudette angrily chokes Fischer and is sent to maximum security. Unable to adjust to life outside, Taystee purposely commits a crime to return to the prison. A journalist following Larry's interview asks Natalie Figueroa, the deputy warden, about spending cuts at Litchfield, despite an increase in the prison's funding. Alex admits she ratted on Piper for dumping her, but she had lied in order to rekindle their relationship. Larry asks Piper to marry him immediately. Pennsatucky is encouraged by her lawyer to "witness" to Piper. Following Pennsatucky's instructions, Piper "prays" for forgiveness, but refuses to be baptized. Pennsatucky sees this refusal as another instance of being "disrespected" and announces her plans to murder Piper. Flashback: Pennsatucky shoots and kills an abortion provider who made a snide remark about her fifth abortion. A Christian anti-abortion group mistakenly believe Pennsatucky's act was to stop abortions; they declare her a hero for their movement and provide her with pro bono legal help. The flashbacks also imply that Pennsatucky was not particularly religious until that experience.
13	13	"Can't Fix Crazy"	Michael Trim	Tara Herrmann & Jenji Kohan	none	July 11, 2013
Caputo chooses Gloria Mendoza to replace Red as head cook. To reclaim her position, Red sabotages the kitchen, but the resulting grease fire injures Gina and prompts Norma to end her friendship with Red. Red is subsequently starved out by Gloria and the kitchen staff. Figueroa leans on Bennett to squash the investigation into Neptune's Produce. Piper tells Alex that she is choosing Larry, after which Alex cuts Piper out of her life. Larry confronts Alex in visitation, but Alex informs him that it was Piper who rekindled their sexual relationship; Alex asserts Larry's insecurity stems from Piper's weaknesses and not her machinations. Larry breaks up with Piper, while Alex starts a sexual relationship with Nicky and turns Piper away. Following the success of the prison's Christmas pageant, Piper abruptly leaves during the final song. Pennsatucky follows Piper, which results in a confrontation in the prison yard. Piper appeals to Healy for help, but he walks off and purposely abandons her. Pennsatucky charges at Piper with a shiv fashioned from a wooden cross and says she does not deserve love. This makes Piper finally lose control; she relentlessly beats and punches Pennsatucky.

== Production ==
Show creator Jenji Kohan read Piper Kerman's memoir after a friend sent it to her. She then set up a meeting with Kerman to pitch her on a TV adaptation, which she notes she "screwed up" as she spent most of the time asking Kerman about her experiences she described in the book rather than selling her on the show. This appealed to Kerman as it let her know that she was a fan and she signed off on the adaptation. Kohan would later go on to describe the main character, Piper Chapman, as a "trojan horse" for the series, allowing it to focus on characters whose demographics would not normally be represented on TV. In July 2011, it was revealed that Netflix was in negotiations with Lionsgate for a 13-episode TV adaptation of Kerman's memoirs with Kohan as creator. In November 2011, negotiations were finalized and the series had been greenlit.

=== Casting ===
Casting announcements began in August 2012 with Taylor Schilling, the first to be cast, in the lead role as Piper Chapman, followed by Jason Biggs as Piper's fiancé Larry Bloom. Laura Prepon and Yael Stone were next to join the series. Abigail Savage, who plays Gina, and Alysia Reiner, who plays Fig, had auditioned for role of Alex Vause. Prepon initially auditioned for Piper Chapman, however Kohan felt she would not worry about her [in prison], noting a "toughness and a presence to her that wasn’t right for the character." Kohan instead gave her the role of Alex. Stone had originally auditioned for the role of Nicky Nichols, but she was not considered "tough enough" for the character; she was asked to audition for Lorna Morello instead. Likability was important for Morello, whom casting director Jen Euston deemed "a very helpful, nice, sweet Italian girl." Laverne Cox, a black transgender woman, was cast as Sophia Burset, a transgender character. The Advocate touted Orange Is the New Black as possibly the first women-in-prison narrative to cast a transgender woman for this type of role. Natasha Lyonne was to audition for Alex, but was asked to read for the character Nicky Nichols; "[Kohan knew] she could do Nicky with her eyes closed. She was perfect," said Euston. Uzo Aduba read for the part of Janae Watson but was offered the character Suzanne "Crazy Eyes" Warren. Taryn Manning was offered the role of Tiffany "Pennsatucky" Doggett. This American Life host Ira Glass was offered a role as a public radio host, but he declined. The role instead went to Robert Stanton, who plays the fictional host Maury Kind.

== Reception ==
=== Critical response ===
Orange Is the New Black has received critical acclaim, particularly praised for humanizing prisoners and for its depiction of race, sexuality, gender and body types. The first season received positive reviews from critics, review aggregator Metacritic gave it a weighted average score of 79 out of 100 based on reviews from 32 critics, indicating favorable reviews. On Rotten Tomatoes, season one has a 93% approval rating based on 40 reviews, with an average rating of 8.2 out of 10 . The site's critical consensus is "Orange Is the New Black is a sharp mix of black humor and dramatic heft, with interesting characters and an intriguing flashback structure."

Hank Stuever, television critic for The Washington Post, gave Orange Is the New Black a perfect score. In his review of the series, he stated: "In Jenji Kohan's magnificent and thoroughly engrossing new series, Orange Is the New Black, prison is still the pits. But it is also filled with the entire range of human emotion and stories, all of which are brought vividly to life in a world where a stick of gum could ignite either a romance or a death threat." Maureen Ryan, of The Huffington Post, wrote: "Orange is one of the best new programs of the year, and the six episodes I've seen have left me hungry to see more."

=== Critics' top ten list ===
Orange Is the New Black was considered one of the best shows of the year by many critics and journalists.

- 1st – Boob Tube Dude
- 1st – The Daily Beast
- 2nd – Boston Globe
- 2nd – Film School Rejects
- 2nd – HitFix
- 2nd – Indiewire
- 2nd – Los Angeles Times
- 2nd – San Francisco Chronicle
- 2nd – Washington Post
- 3rd – PopMatters
- 3rd – Slate
- 3rd – Time
- 4th – Complex
- 4th – Entertainment Weekly (Melissa Maerz)
- 4th – Paste
- 5th – Grantland
- 5th – Lincoln Journal Star
- 6th – Entertainment Weekly (Jeff Jensen)
- 6th – New York Vulture
- 6th – Philadelphia Daily News
- 6th – Pittsburgh Post-Gazette
- 8th – Austin Chronicle
- 8th – Filmmaker Magazine
- 8th – Houston Chronicle
- 8th – The Oregonian
- 9th – NPR
- 10th – NPR Fresh Air
- – Huffington Post
- – IGN
- – RedEye Chicago

=== Accolades ===
Award	Category	Nominee(s)	Result	Ref.
American Film Institute Awards	Top 10 Television Programs of the Year	Orange Is the New Black	Won	
Artios Awards	Outstanding Achievement in Casting – Television Series Comedy	Jennifer Euston, Emer O'Callaghan	Won	
Artios Awards	Outstanding Achievement in Casting – Television Pilot Comedy	Jennifer Euston	Won	
Critics' Choice Television Awards	Best Comedy Series	Orange Is the New Black	Won	
Critics' Choice Television Awards	Best Supporting Actress in a Comedy Series	Kate Mulgrew	Won	
Critics' Choice Television Awards	Best Supporting Actress in a Comedy Series	Laverne Cox	Nominated	
Critics' Choice Television Awards	Best Guest Performer in a Comedy Series	Uzo Aduba	Won	
Dorian Awards	TV Drama of the Year	Orange Is the New Black	Won	
Dorian Awards	LBGTQ TV Show of the Year	Orange Is the New Black	Won	
Dorian Awards	TV Performance of the Year – Actress	Taylor Schilling	Nominated	
GLAAD Media Awards	Outstanding Comedy Series	Orange Is the New Black	Won	
Gold Derby Awards	Best Comedy Series	Orange Is the New Black	Won	
Gold Derby Awards	Best Comedy Lead Actress	Taylor Schilling	Nominated	
Gold Derby Awards	Best Comedy Supporting Actress	Kate Mulgrew	Won	
Gold Derby Awards	Best Comedy Supporting Actress	Danielle Brooks	Nominated	
Gold Derby Awards	Best Comedy Guest Actor	Pablo Schreiber	Won	
Gold Derby Awards	Best Comedy Guest Actress	Uzo Aduba	Won	
Gold Derby Awards	Best Comedy Guest Actress	Laverne Cox	Nominated	
Gold Derby Awards	Best Comedy Guest Actress	Taryn Manning	Nominated	
Gold Derby Awards	Best Comedy Episode of the Year	"Can't Fix Crazy"	Won	
Gold Derby Awards	Best Ensemble of the Year		Won	
Golden Globe Awards	Best Actress – Television Series Drama	Taylor Schilling	Nominated	
Grammy Awards	Best Song Written for Visual Media	Regina Spektor – "You've Got Time"	Nominated	
NAACP Image Awards	Outstanding Writing in a Drama Series	Sara Hess	Nominated	
People's Choice Awards	Favorite Streaming Series	Orange Is the New Black	Won	
Primetime Emmy Awards	Outstanding Comedy Series		Nominated	
Primetime Emmy Awards	Outstanding Lead Actress in a Comedy Series	Taylor Schilling	Nominated	
Primetime Emmy Awards	Outstanding Supporting Actress in a Comedy Series	Kate Mulgrew	Nominated	
Primetime Emmy Awards	Outstanding Directing for a Comedy Series	Jodie Foster	Nominated	
Primetime Emmy Awards	Outstanding Writing for a Comedy Series	Friedman, Kohan	Nominated	
Primetime Creative Arts Emmy Awards	Outstanding Guest Actress in a Comedy Series	Uzo Aduba	Won	
Primetime Creative Arts Emmy Awards	Outstanding Guest Actress in a Comedy Series	Laverne Cox	Nominated	
Primetime Creative Arts Emmy Awards	Outstanding Guest Actress in a Comedy Series	Natasha Lyonne	Nominated	
Primetime Creative Arts Emmy Awards	Outstanding Casting for a Comedy Series	Jennifer Euston	Won	
Primetime Creative Arts Emmy Awards	Outstanding Single-Camera Picture Editing for a Comedy Series	William Turro	Won	
Primetime Creative Arts Emmy Awards	Outstanding Single-Camera Picture Editing for a Comedy Series	Shannon Mitchell	Nominated	
Primetime Creative Arts Emmy Awards	Outstanding Single-Camera Picture Editing for a Comedy Series	Michael S. Stern	Nominated	
Satellite Awards	Best Television Series – Musical or Comedy	Orange Is the New Black	Won	
Satellite Awards	Best Actress – Television Series Musical or Comedy	Taylor Schilling	Won	
Satellite Awards	Best Supporting Actress – Series, Miniseries or Television Film	Laura Prepon	Won	
Satellite Awards	Best Supporting Actress – Series, Miniseries or Television Film	Uzo Aduba	Nominated	
Satellite Awards	Best Cast – Television Series	Cast: Taylor Schilling, Laura Prepon, Michael Harney, Michelle Hurst, Kate Mulgrew, Jason Biggs	Won	
Television Critics Association Awards	Program of the Year	Orange Is the New Black	Nominated	
Television Critics Association Awards	Outstanding New Program	Orange Is the New Black	Won	
Writers Guild of America Awards	Television: Comedy Series	Writers: Liz Friedman, Sian Heder, Tara Herrmann, Sara Hess, Nick Jones, Jenji Kohan, Gary Lennon, Lauren Morelli, Marco Ramirez	Nominated	
Writers Guild of America Awards	Television: New Series	Writers: Liz Friedman, Sian Heder, Tara Herrmann, Sara Hess, Nick Jones, Jenji Kohan, Gary Lennon, Lauren Morelli, Marco Ramirez	Nominated	
Writers Guild of America Awards	Television: Episodic Comedy	Friedman, Kohan	Nominated	
Writers Guild of America Awards	Television: Episodic Comedy	Sian Heder	Nominated	

== Broadcast ==
The series began airing on broadcast television in New Zealand on TV2 on August 19, 2013. It premiered in Australia on October 9, 2013, on Showcase.
