= Nicky Nichols =

Fictional character

Nicole "Nicky" Nichols
- Orange Is the New Black character
- Natasha Lyonne as Nicky Nichols
- First appearance: "I Wasn't Ready" (2013)
- Portrayed by: Natasha Lyonne; Carla Oudin (flashback scenes); Presley Ryan (age 13)

In-universe information
- Full name: Nicole Nichols
- Family: Marka Nichols (mother); Les Nichols (father); Red (prison mother); Tricia Miller (former prison sister; deceased)
- Significant other: Lorna Morello (complicated)
- Nationality: American

Nicole Nichols is a fictional character played by Natasha Lyonne on the Netflix series Orange Is the New Black. She is a recurring character in season one and a main character from season two onwards. Lyonne received an Emmy nomination in 2014 for the role.

== Casting and background ==
Natasha Lyonne had intended to audition for the part of Lorna Morello but, according to Lyonne, "they wouldn’t let me [audition for Morello], because they already liked me for Nicky." Yael Stone, who had auditioned for the role of Nichols, was cast as Morello.

Lyonne feels that she can relate closely to Nichols's storyline as she has had experience of drug addiction. She says, "believe me, there's no shortage of things for me to draw on when it comes to Nicky's backstory". The scar that is visible on Nichols's chest during the series is a real scar from Lyonne's heart surgery in 2012. Orange Is the New Black is Lyonne's first time as a series regular.

Nicky is introduced as a drug addict from a wealthy family. Her upbringing was privileged but dysfunctional; her father was absent for much of her childhood, her mother is cold and distant, and she alludes to having been "interfered with" by her uncle Pete.

== Storylines ==
=== Season 1 ===
Nichols is first seen in the premiere episode. Early on, she becomes friends with the series' protagonist Piper Chapman (played by Taylor Schilling). Nichols has a sexual relationship with Lorna Morello which ends in the fifth episode because Morello says that she wants to remain loyal to her fiancé and complains that Nichols is "making her feel like a cave". Galina "Red" Reznikov (played by Kate Mulgrew) is a close friend and 'mother figure' to Nichols, however, the two have a disagreement when Red cuts off fellow inmate Tricia Miller (played by Madeline Brewer) and allows her to be sent to solitary confinement. Nichols retaliates against Red by reporting to a correctional officer exactly how Red manages to smuggle contraband into the prison. In the final episode of the season, Nichols is seen to be seducing Alex Vause (played by Laura Prepon), who is a love interest of Chapman.

=== Season 2 ===
Nichols engages in a competition with Carrie "Big Boo" Black (played by Lea DeLaria) to see who can have sex with the most women in the prison. Nichols spends a long time trying to seduce one of the correctional officers. She is not successful. Eventually, they both call it a draw at 36 points and engage in a 'cookie-eating contest' instead. The other major storyline for Nichols in this season involves heroin that she accepts from another inmate.

=== Season 3 ===
Nichols and Big Boo attempt to sell their stash of heroin and they cooperate with correctional officer Joel Luschek, who finds a buyer. Nichols then says that it has been stolen but, in reality, she has hidden it for her own use. Other inmates Leanne Taylor (played by Emma Myles) and Angie Rice (played by Julie Lake) find the heroin and start taking it. Luschek discovers this and confiscates the drug. When assistant warden Joe Caputo (played by Nick Sandow) discovers the heroin, Luschek blames Nichols and Nichols is sent to a maximum security prison. This is Nichols's last appearance in the third season.

=== Season 4 ===
In the midst of season four, Nichols can be seen in an episode as a maximum security inmate, along with Sophia Burset (played by Laverne Cox) and Stella Carlin (played by Ruby Rose). Luschek repents of his actions against Nichols, and asks new inmate Judy King to use her connections to get Nichols out of maximum security. She returns to minimum security where she is welcomed with a big party. Her drug problem persists, however.

=== Season 5 ===
During a prison riot, Nichols decides to take over the pharmacy with Lorna Morello. Later, while Soso is depressed and asking Nichols for drugs, Nichols confesses that she has hopelessly fallen in love with "an incredible, insane, beautiful woman" who would never love her back. Morello overhears everything but does not comment. In a later episode, Nichols and Morello restart their sexual relationship, but Morello ends it a few hours after, saying that during their intercourse she realized she was pregnant. Nichols does not believe her and is heartbroken. Vause finds her crying in the shower. While Red is becoming paranoid because of the correctional officer (CO) Piscatella, Nichols decides to take care of her but is eventually abducted by the CO. She is kept in a room tied up with the rest of her prison "family". After they are able to escape, Nichols goes back to the pharmacy to see Morello and realizes that she is actually pregnant. She then calls Morello's husband to convince him to stay with her because "some people would give anything to be loved like that". While the police begins to raid the prison, she asks Morello to surrender and tell them that she is pregnant. Nichols then returns to Frieda's bunker and they all wait for the police to enter.

=== Season 6 ===
Nicky is held in Ad-Seg at the beginning of season six, along with Piper, Daya, Red, Taystee, Cindy, Blanca, Suzanne and Frieda. Upon a granted ten-minute phone call, she calls her father, Les Nichols, with a request for an attorney to defend her innocence. During this, she learns that she has a half-sister named Sammi that she was unaware of prior. Upon reuniting with her father and her attorney, Michelle, Nicky also learns that they are engaged and have two children together. She decides she made a mistake in calling them and leaves.

Later, Red gets the message to her that Piscatella is dead. Nicky requests again to speak to her father and his fiancée, who instructs her to give up Red. When she refuses, they tell her that breaking into the prison pharmacy and handing out drugs during the riot racked up what could amount to 70 years in drug charges added to her sentence, which would be waived if she gave up Red. She arranges for both of them to have phone time so that she can tell Red what she's facing. After giving Red's name up, she is taken out of AdSeg to gen pop. On her way out, Red bangs on the glass of her cell and mouths, "it's okay."

She offered to join Flaca's show when Flaca was looking for a partner, but Nicky was too comedic and not gossipy. In gen pop, Nicky arrives at C-Block and drops off the supplies needed to inseminate Blanca, she later shares a conversation with Red. Nicky helps Flores attempt to get pregnant. However, since Flores had to buy drugs off of C-Block and gave them to D-Block in order to get Diablo's semen snuck in, they get beat up during the insemination process in the library by Brock, Charlene Teng, Akers, Creech and Shruti Chambal.

They end up in the hospital ward, but Flores is released early to make room for Barbara, who OD'd on bath salts. Barbara and Nicky end up bonding over their shared addiction. Nicky encourages Barbara to get sober. Nicky states that she is in her 8th time of being sober. ("Break the String") After they are released from the hospital ward, she spends time with Annalisa, Lorna and Nicky. She shows them her bottle trick and Lorna is completely amazed. Nicky gives her a 30-day sober chip. Deitland arrives and Barb allows the 3 to order whatever they want from the commissary. Nicky gets 3 honey buns. She also states she wants to have sex with someone to Lorna as she eyes up an inmate, Nicky mocks Barb when she is angered when Carol allegedly bought all the Noxzema. Nicky goes to C-Block to clean, Red is called over by Nicky and sneaks around to see her. Red states she hates Madison. Nicky warns her about Carol, but Red calls Carol real and they argue about Carol and Barbara. She sets up a plan to kill Carol while she's getting a haircut in the salon, alongside Red, who has become Carol's confidante, due to their mutual hatred of Frieda. She tells Nicky, much to the dismay of Annalisa and Daddy. Nicky tries to discourage her from doing it. ("Chocolate Chip Nookie")

Nicky comes into Lorna's cell and calls Adeola 'Miss Cleo', much to her annoyance. Then she says that she believes some rats have returned. Adeola corrects Nicky and explains they all died from poison, and leaves. Nicky thinks of a way to save Red. She hides a note in a bottle cap and tries to kick it towards Red, but it is picked up by Copeland instead. Inside is a warning about Barbara's plan, so Copeland takes Carol into custody for protection and clears the salon. Later, Nicky is summoned by Barbara by Annalisa, who is told to smile, and does sarcastically. When asked what she was doing, Nicky replies she was masturbating. Barbara states that the girls think she is a mole but Nicky reminds her that she sold out Red, Nicky is angered and squares up to Daya, wondering why she thinks she's a big shot. Barb apologises, hugging Nicky and saying she loves Nicky's company and that she's funny and Nicky leaves. Nicky sighs of relief when outside. A day before the kickball game, Nicky is still unsure about this new plan but pretends to go along with it. ("Well This Took a Dark Turn")

On the day of the kickball game, Nicky officiates Piper and Alex's wedding, being sarcastic and lighthearted. She takes away Lorna's shiv, which has all the wedding traditions in one. Piper and Alex kiss early and Nicky stops them and Lorna cries, calling Nicky a monster. Afterwards, Nicky tries to convince Lorna that it's stupid to go to war against people who randomly got assigned to either C or D-Block. She manages to finally break through to Lorna, telling her that she just witnessed a C-Block wedding and the two of them head in the opposite direction of the field. They hide in a utility closet in the laundry room. Annalisa shows up and Nicky is forced to reveal herself after Lorna accidentally makes a noise. Annalisa shoves her against the washer and asks her what she was doing. Nicky lies and says that she was there to grab a weapon. Annalisa pins her against the wall, saying she's done with her bullshit and asks where her weapon is. Nicky brings out Lorna's shiv. The two of them head out to the kickball field. ("Be Free")

Out on the kickball field, Maria gets the guard to mix up the teams. Annalisa says that Barbara isn't going to like this but Nicky points out that Barbara isn't out there with them. Daddy says that doesn't change anything. Nicky is asked where Lorna is as they need her as a distraction. As they play the game, Annalisa says that they should rush the other girls now but Nicky tells her that she doesn't have beef with any of these girls. Daddy even agrees. She continues to play the game and the gang war doesn't come to pass. ("Be Free")

=== Season 7 ===
In season 7, Nichols is reunited with Red, Morello and Gloria in the new kitchen for immigrant detainees (ICE). While working there, a volunteer chef from ICE, Shani Abboud, becomes the love interest of Nicky and they pursue a relationship together. Distracted by her new love, she neglects Red who is deteriorating after spending time in isolation and develops early-onset dementia, which worsens over the season. Her past love interest, Lorna, also begins having problems when she finds out her infant son died of pneumonia and cannot accept that his death was real. Her mental state also deteriorates but Nichols is adamant that she will be there for Morello, especially since she was so naive about Red.

Abboud and Nichols's relationship becomes complicated when Nicky learns that Abboud forcibly underwent female genital mutilation when she was 12. Nicky discovers this when she attempts to perform oral sex on Abboud, who quickly admits that she is uncomfortable. Abboud soon fails to impress the immigration judge and is deported back home, she gives Gloria her final note for Nicky. The final episode sees Nicky apparently having taken over from Red as head cook.

== Critical commentary ==
Sarah Karlan of BuzzFeed praised the character's "impossibly quick wit" and "perfectly deadpan delivery". Rebekah Allen of SheWired said Lyonne is "wonderful" in the role, and called Nichols one of the best characters on the series. MTV's Crystal Bell called Nichols a "fan-favorite" and "our beloved smart mouth" and expressed disappointment at the character's departure in the third season.

Lyonne received an Emmy nomination for her role as Nichols. She lost out to fellow Orange Is the New Black actress Uzo Aduba.

== See also ==
- List of Orange Is the New Black characters
