= Tiffany Doggett =

Fictional character of Netflix series Orange Is the New Black

- Orange Is the New Black character
- Taryn Manning as Tiffany Doggett
- First appearance: "The Chickening" (2013)
- Last appearance: "Here's Where We Get Off" (2019)
- Portrayed by: Taryn Manning; Oona Laurence (young)

In-universe information
- Alias: Pennsatucky
- Occupation: Laundry (former), van driver (former), electrical (former)
- Family: Debbie Doggett (mother)
- Significant others: Nathan; Arlen; Charlie Coates (correctional officer)

Tiffany "Pennsatucky" Doggett is a fictional character in the Netflix series Orange Is the New Black, portrayed by Taryn Manning. Manning was offered the role without needing to audition. The character of Doggett is based on a real-life prisoner, a "young woman from western Pennsylvania who proudly called herself a redneck". She is from Waynesboro, Virginia. Prior to her imprisonment, she is shown to be exchanging sexual favors for soda or money. Doggett is also known to have had five abortions. She is charged with shooting a nurse at the abortion clinic who disrespected her, and decides to hire a Christian lawyer; the ensuing support she receives from Christian groups leads to Doggett becoming a born-again Christian.

Doggett makes her first appearance in Season 1, episode 5 and is the main antagonist but becomes a protagonist in later seasons. In her debut episode, she unsuccessfully attempts to hang up a cross in the prison chapel and expresses homophobic views. She conflicts with Alex Vause and Piper Chapman throughout the first season. In the second season, Doggett's storyline revolves around her friendships with Sam Healy and Carrie "Big Boo" Black. This friendship with Big Boo continues into the third season. Big Boo comforts Doggett when the latter is feeling remorse for her abortions and when she is raped by a correctional officer. When she is transferred to maximum security, she becomes close friends with Suzanne Warren and begins studying to get her GED. When she is wronged by the system and believes herself to have failed the test which she passed, Doggett relapses and overdoses, resulting in her death. The character Doggett and her storylines have received mixed reviews from critics, though Manning's performance has received critical acclaim.

== Creation and casting ==
Tiffany Doggett's nickname "Pennsatucky" is derived from Pennsyltucky, a slang term for the rural portions of Pennsylvania. The author, Piper Kerman, of the book Orange Is the New Black: My Year in a Women's Prison, which inspired Orange is the New Black, describes the real life version of Pennsatucky as "a young woman from western Pennsylvania who proudly called herself a redneck". Kerman further describes her as someone addicted to crack cocaine and dealing with the loss of custody of her child.

Taryn Manning, already an established actress, did not have to audition for the role of Doggett and was offered it. Manning, when speaking about this to Joshua Rotter of Download.com, said that she immediately accepted the offer. "I loved it and didn't need to look any further. I was sold." To prepare for the role, Manning did some research on faith healing and evangelistic ceremonies. She also states that her inspiration for Doggett at least partly comes from the White family in the 2009 documentary film The Wild and Wonderful Whites of West Virginia. The only make-up that Manning wears for her role as Doggett, in the first season, is on her teeth to create the effect of receding gums and missing teeth. From the second season onward, however, Doggett has false teeth in place and so the teeth seen are Manning's own.

== Fictional background ==
Doggett is from Waynesboro, Virginia. After Doggett has her first period, her mother gives her advice about sex: "go on and let them [referring to men] do their business." This leads to her, later in life, to have sex with men in exchange for soda or money. Her perspective of sex changes when she meets Nathan. Jonathon Dornbush, of Entertainment Weekly writes "[Nathan] wants them both to enjoy the experience [of sex], and it opens Tiffany's perception of relationships." Nathan and his family move away, causing their relationship to end, and, almost immediately afterwards, Doggett is raped by an ex-boyfriend.

Doggett has had five abortions. After having her fifth abortion, which takes place at an abortion clinic in Fishersville, Virginia, the nurse remarks "we should give you a punch card, get the sixth one free." Doggett is so offended by this joke that she shoots the nurse with a shotgun. She agrees to have a Christian lawyer as it was likely to lead to a lighter sentence and her legal bills being paid for. Since she shot an abortion nurse, she became a 'hero' of the anti-abortion movement. Doggett regularly receives cards praising her for her claims of defending the unborn as well as generous cash donations to her commissary account by fans & supporters. Although her Christian faith was fake, at some point Doggett did become a Christian; this was confirmed by Manning in an interview. Manning describes Doggett's faith as "a hybrid of Christianity, Baptism, Presbyterian".

== Storylines ==
=== Season 1 ===
Doggett first appears in the fifth episode. She wishes to hang up a cross in Litchfield Penitentiary's chapel but is refused permission. She ignores this and hangs her cross up on a light fixture; this causes the entire fixture to fall down and hence damages the chapel's ceiling. She also displays transphobia; calling the transgender woman Sophia Burset (played by Laverne Cox) an 'abomination' and 'it' and blaming her for the damage to the chapel. Doggett has numerous clashes with Alex Vause (played by Laura Prepon); firstly Vause threatens to rape Doggett after growing tired of her complaining about Piper Chapman (played by Taylor Schilling); Doggett locks Vause in a dryer while she is helping Chapman to fix it and, lastly, Doggett snitches on Chapman and Vause for dancing provocatively with each other; resulting in Chapman being placed in solitary confinement.

Chapman and Vause get revenge on Doggett and trick her into believing that she has faith healing powers, eventually culminating in her being sent to the psychiatric ward. Although Chapman aids in Doggett's release from the psychiatric ward, Doggett still bears a grudge against her. Doggett's lawyer encourages her to evangelize to Chapman instead and this leads to Chapman 'converting' but then refusing to be baptized. Doggett sees this as disrespectful and expresses a wish to kill Chapman. The two have a confrontation at the end of the season's final episode. Doggett attacks Chapman with a shiv made from a wooden cross; Chapman throws Doggett to the ground and hits her repeatedly.

=== Season 2 ===
It is revealed in the third episode that Suzanne Warren (played by Uzo Aduba) is also involved in the fight at the end of season one. She punches Chapman in the face twice and knocks her unconscious (Doggett is already unconscious at this stage). This gives the impression that Doggett and Chapman were evenly matched and therefore equally responsible. Following Doggett's return to full health, she finds that her previous best friends, Leanne Taylor (played by Emma Myles) and Angie Rice (played by Julie Lake), no longer want to be associated with her. This leaves Doggett seeking prison counsellor Sam Healy (played by Michael J. Harney) for comfort.

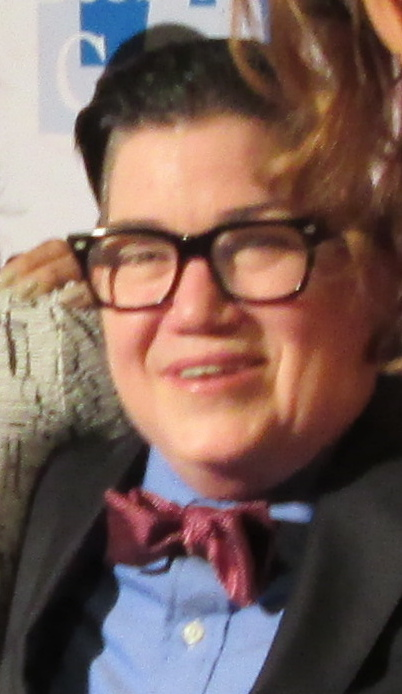
DeLaria's character "Big Boo" starts a friendship with Doggett in Season 2 which develops further in Season 3.

Following her friendships with Taylor and Rice continuing to deteriorate, Doggett forms friendships with Healy and Carrie "Big Boo" Black (played by Lea DeLaria). Healy and Doggett unite to form "Safe Place", a therapy group where prisoners can share their feelings in a confidential and supportive environment. "Safe Place" is short-lived, however, and Healy decides to cancel the group indefinitely after Doggett fails to attend one of the sessions; when he investigates her reason for non-attendance, he finds her getting a hair cut from Burset. Doggett initially talks to Big Boo, an openly lesbian inmate, during a blackout in the prison as she believes that there is a secret 'gay agenda' and she believes that Big Boo will give her the answers that she is seeking. Doggett's physical appearance also changes in this season; she has white false teeth, neater hair and her skin looks smoother.

=== Season 3 ===
In the first episode, Big Boo and Doggett's friendship continues to develop. Seeing that Doggett bears strong feelings of guilt relating to the five abortions that she has had, Big Boo makes reference to the book Freakonomics, which suggests that crime rates in the 1990s fell because of Roe v. Wade. Following Lorna Morello (played by Yael Stone) being relieved of her duty of driving the prison van, the role is given to Doggett. She comes into contact with one of the new correctional officers called Charlie Coates (played by James McMenamin). Coates is initially friendly towards Doggett. Despite relationships between prison staff and prisoners being forbidden, Coates kisses Doggett, against her will, after feeding some ducks. Following another outing, Coates gets in trouble with his boss Joe Caputo (Nick Sandow) for being late for count and is placed on probation. Doggett apologises for having caused him trouble, but nevertheless he rapes her in the back of the prison van.

When Big Boo learns of the rape, she encourages Doggett to take revenge on Coates by making him unconscious and then raping him with a broomstick. Whilst they successfully drug Coates, neither of them are willing to violate him. In order to end contact with Coates, Doggett fakes a seizure on her next outing with him and is declared unfit for driving a van. She is replaced as prison van driver by another inmate, Maritza Ramos (played by Diane Guerrero).

=== Season 4 ===
Coates approaches Doggett in the fourth episode of season 4; Doggett responds in a manner that shows clearly that she is still affected by the rape. This is also the first time that Doggett openly refers to the incident as a 'rape'. Coates is seen to be visibly distressed by this. Towards the middle of the season, it is shown that Coates finally apologizes to Doggett and she, clearly surprised and relieved, forgives him and goes on to tell Big Boo about what happened. Big Boo, still furious about the rape, refuses to accept Doggett's decision, straining their friendship. In the twelfth episode of the season, Doggett explains to Big Boo the reasons why she decided to forgive Coates: "Pain is always there... but suffering is a choice". The two resume their friendship following this.

In "Toast Can Never Be Bread Again", as Doggett and Big Boo are assigned to cover the cafeteria following the death of Poussey Washington (played by Samira Wiley), Coates is also there to watch over the body. Coates then tells Doggett that he needs to quit because he hates how awful the prison is becoming. She tells him she does not want him to go, since they are on good terms, and she likes talking to him, despite what happened. She kisses him and Coates makes it clear that he wants to go further than this but chooses not to, reasoning "I don't want to ruin where we are now".

=== Season 5 ===
During the first episode, "Riot FOMO", Doggett hides in commissary with Boo while a riot takes place throughout the prison. She later turns against her former friends Angie and Leanne in favour of Coates; she snatches a gun from Angie and passes it to Coates so that he can escape the prison. Doggett is then put on trial in a kangaroo court, but Boo convinces the other inmates to let her go; arguing that punishing Doggett would make them, morally, no better than the prison guards that have been mistreating them all for such a long time. At the end of the season, she escapes the prison through a broken fence to reunite with Coates.

=== Season 6 ===
At the beginning of the sixth season, Doggett was hiding in the trunk of Coates' car as he and Officer Dixon take a 'road trip'. While parked in front of a hotel, she eventually gets tired of hiding in the trunk, goes up to their hotel room, and gets in bed with Coates. Later, Doggett, disguised as a young boy, Coates, and Dixon go to an amusement park, where she and Coates are mistaken for a gay couple and harassed before Dixon intervenes. Coates plans to take Doggett with him to Canada where they can live a 'normal life' together; in the hotel, he grabs Doggett quite violently while making this point to her. While camping in the woods, Coates has another anger outburst in the presence of Doggett, and, after Coates falls asleep, Doggett leaves him and turns herself into the police. While back in prison, she makes a deal with Linda Ferguson (played by Beth Dover) that she would be placed in a desirable cell block in exchange for keeping quiet about Ferguson's relationship with Big Boo during the riot.

=== Season 7 ===
Doggett learns that she has dyslexia while studying for the GED, and receives extra tutoring from Tasha "Taystee" Jefferson (played by Danielle Brooks). Because of the carelessness of Joel Luschek (played by Matt Peters), she doesn't receive her extra time (because of her dyslexia) on her final exam and she assumes that she has failed. Distraught, Doggett meets with Dayanara "Daya" Diaz (played by Dascha Polanco) and her gang who are doing drugs in a laundry room, joins them, overdoses on fentanyl and dies before Taystee sees her lying on the floor, unconscious. Her spirit is later seen waving goodbye before disappearing. It is also revealed later that Doggett had, in fact, passed her GED exam, without the need for extra time after all.

== Critical commentary ==
Doggett was widely perceived to have been the series' main antagonist in its first season. She was seen to be homophobic and racist; one Cosmopolitan critic described her as 'vile'. A critic for TV Insider described the first season Doggett as "terrifying, manipulative and so entirely unlikable" but also "hypnotic to watch". Horatia Harrod's review in the Daily Telegraph described Manning's portrayal of Doggett as "brilliantly unhinged". Other critics have praised the character, especially in the final episode of season one; calling her "fantastic", a "solid character" and "one of the best characters on the show". Some also felt that Manning's performance was worthy of an Emmy nomination.

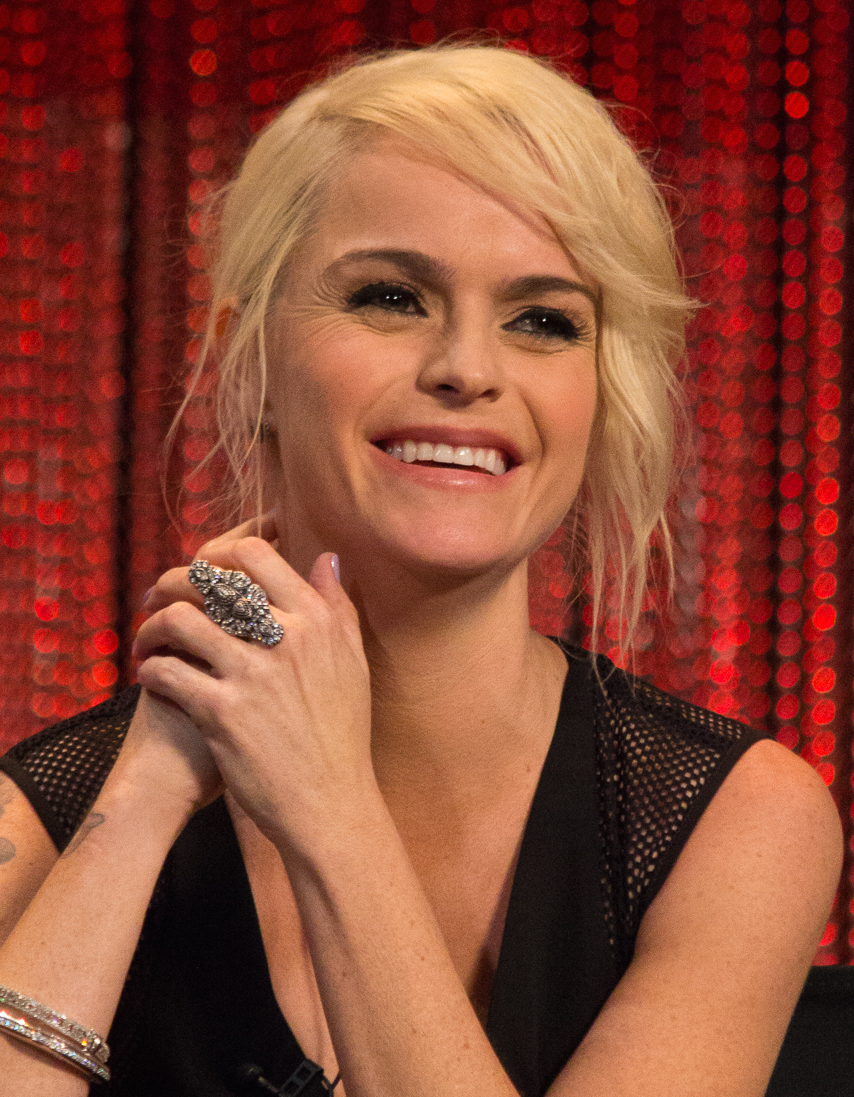
Manning was described by critic Horatia Harrod as "brilliantly unhinged" in her portrayal of Doggett.

Following the release of the first season of Orange is the New Black, Doggett received some criticism from different media. Writing for The American Conservative, B. D. McClay claimed that Doggett was a poor and inaccurate representation of American Christians; "Pennsatucky is such an aggressively terrible character" and "her faith is neither well-understood nor well-drawn". Laura Leonard of Christianity Today, supports Clay's view and goes further to say "it was frustrating to see this one painful narrative represent Christian faith on OITNB, a show that masters other aspects of the melting pot so well", speaking about Doggett's background story and conflict with Chapman. Two critics for The A.V. Club also gave negative reviews of Doggett; Emily St. James says that "Pennsatucky never really comes together as a character in the same way as some of the others on the show" and Myles McNutt opted to criticize the storyline of the final episode of the first season specifically, saying that it "[treats] her like a cartoon villain instead of a real character". Betsy Leondar-Wright accused the series' creators of classism and said that Doggett was an "outrageous Redneck stereotype".

Doggett's rape storyline in the third season garnered much reaction, both positive and negative. Jada Yuan of Vulture described the rape scenes (both the one in the flashback and the one involving correctional officer Coates) as "heartbreaking" and praised episode director Jesse Peretz's decision to keep the camera focused on Manning during the scenes. Megan Vick praised the 'transformation' of the character of Doggett, calling it "the season's breakout storyline and performance". McNutt, who had been critical of Doggett in the first season, spoke positively about the rape storyline.

Marissa Higgins, writing for xoJane, contended that the show "didn't accomplish anything with their portrayal of sexual assault" and said that she disliked the way that the story ended with Doggett effectively quitting her job as van driver in order to avoid further contact with Coates. Emma Eisenberg of Salon criticized the scenes depicting Doggett growing up in Waynesboro as being "riddled with excessive Appalachian clichés". She went further by calling Doggett's mother unrealistic in her attitude towards sex: "the mothers I met [near Waynesboro] wanted their daughters to understand sex and to make informed choices". Eisenberg claimed that, therefore, Doggett's mother's speech about sex − "it's like a bee sting, in and out, over before you knew it was happening" − was not representative of people in Waynesboro at that time. Chloe Stillwell completely disagreed with Eisenberg and insisted that the character of Doggett was realistic: "Eisenberg's argument completely misses the point that perhaps the show is trying to be as real as possible, and acknowledging that there are real life Pennsatuckies in this world isn't to disenfranchise Appalachia." The relationship between Coates and Doggett continued to gain criticism in seasons 5 and 6. Anne Cohen, writing for Refinery29, says "Are we supposed to conveniently forget that as an inmate, Doggett can't legally consent? And if that's the direction the show has chosen to go in, is that really the kind of thing we need in a TV culture already brimming with problematic depictions of sexual violence?" Following the termination of their relationship, another critic remarks "I’m relieved she’s away from Coates, and even more relieved that OITNB tied up this story line."

Doggett's death in the penultimate episode of the final season of the show gained significant coverage. Ryan Schwartz called it "one of the biggest tragedies in the series’ seven-year history". Another critic, Allison Schonter, comments on how much the character has grown since being an antagonist in the first series, "[Doggett's] death marked a devastating end for a character who experienced immense character growth throughout seven seasons". Sarah Halle Corey commented that the producers used hints that Taystee was going to commit suicide as a red herring before revealing the plot twist in Doggett's death from drug overdose. Jackie Strause, writing for The Hollywood Reporter, echoed what many other critics had stated, "[the] overdose is especially heartbreaking given how much the character turned her life around since season one."

== See also ==
- List of Orange Is the New Black characters
