= Crazy Eyes (Orange Is the New Black) =

Suzanne Warren
- Orange Is the New Black character
- Uzo Aduba as Suzanne Warren in a promotional poster for season 2 of Orange Is the New Black
- First appearance: "I Wasn't Ready" (2013)
- Last appearance: "Here's Where We Get Off" (2019)
- Portrayed by: Uzo Aduba; Eden Wiggins (age 10); Taliyah Whitaker (age 5)

In-universe information
- Family: Pat Warren (adoptive mother); Dennis Warren (adoptive father); Grace Warren (adoptive sister)
- Significant other: Maureen Kukudio

Suzanne "Crazy Eyes" Warren is a fictional character played by Uzo Aduba on the Netflix series Orange Is the New Black. Warren is portrayed as intelligent and creative, but lacking in social skills and prone to spiral into emotional, sometimes violent, outbursts and delusions when agitated due to mental illness. She is a recurring character in season one and a regular character beginning with season two.

Aduba won the Emmy Award for Outstanding Guest Actress in a Comedy Series and the Critics' Choice Television Award for Best Guest Performer in a Comedy Series for her season one performance. For season two, she received the Emmy Award for Outstanding Supporting Actress in a Drama Series as well as the Screen Actors Guild Award for Outstanding Performance by a Female Actor in a Comedy Series. Her season three performance again won the Screen Actors Guild Award for Outstanding Performance by a Female Actor in a Comedy Series. The character is the only role that has received Emmy Award recognition in both the comedy and drama categories for the same show.

== Appearance ==
In season one, Aduba is credited for 11 of the 13 episodes (not the first or seventh), although she appears in the first episode via footage filmed from another episode.

In season two, episode three ("Hugs Can Be Deceiving"), Eden Wiggins, and Taliyah Whitaker portray the 10-year-old and 5-year-old versions of Warren. Throughout the first two seasons, it is shown that Warren aspires "to be included" and "to make friends and be valued". The character is known for her bantu knots, awkward grin, powerful physique and her crazy eyes.

== Storylines ==
=== Season 1 ===
Suzanne is fixated on Piper Chapman (Taylor Schilling) at the beginning of the season. When Chapman, who has offended prison matriarch Red (Kate Mulgrew), seems hopelessly isolated, Suzanne is the only inmate not too intimidated to help her. She helps Chapman by getting jalapeños, so she can put them in a medicinal lotion for Red's sore back, and Red forgives Chapman. Suzanne nicknames Chapman "Dandelion", because of her blonde hair and puts in a request to become Chapman's bunkmate. Nonetheless, Chapman resists her advances. As a result, Suzanne urinates on the floor in Chapman's bunk quarters. In episode 9, "Fucksgiving", her adoptive parents, Pat and Dennis Warren, are introduced.

=== Season 2 ===
As she rebounds from her unrequited love for Chapman, Suzanne is befriended by veteran inmate Yvonne "Vee" Parker (Lorraine Toussaint) as Vee develops her powerbase in the prison. Vee takes advantage of Suzanne's desperation for affection, and Suzanne becomes Vee's fanatically loyal right-hand woman. Suzanne serves Vee as muscle, even beating up her friend Poussey Washington (Samira Wiley) on Vee's orders. When Vee attacks prison matriarch Galina "Red" Reznikov (Kate Mulgrew) and puts her in the hospital ward, she manipulates Suzanne into believing that she committed the crime. Suzanne gives a statement to prison officials confessing to the attack, but inmate counselor Sam Healy (Michael J. Harney) produces evidence that exonerates her. When she realizes that Vee used her, she breaks into tears.

In episode 3, "Hugs Can Be Deceiving", Suzanne's backstory is revealed via a flashback. She was adopted by white parents and raised in the suburbs, but her mental instability alienated her classmates and their parents alike. Her adoptive mother pushed her to excel at everything she did to prove that she was as good as everyone else; ironically, the constant pressure only made Suzanne's psychological problems worse. In the same episode, it is revealed that Suzanne had run outside and knocked Chapman unconscious after Chapman had beaten Tiffany "Pennsatucky" Doggett (Taryn Manning) unconscious at the end of season 1.

=== Season 3 ===
In season 3, Taystee has her hands full trying to control Suzanne, who is still grieving Vee's death and is unstable, prone to losing her temper and constantly fighting with Poussey. Eventually, she turns to new prison counsellor Berdie Rogers's drama class. There, she begins writing a surrealistic science-fiction erotica series called "The Time Hump Chronicles" which, although considered obscene and strange by both Rogers and Taystee, becomes an instant hit amongst the inmates. Although they prove to be therapeutic for her mental health, Suzanne becomes stressed and irritated with the constant harassment by the other inmates for more material, the persistent ideas that are being floated past her and the fan-fiction that is left at her bunk or lying around. Soon, some of the extracts find their way into the hands of the COs, resulting in Officer Donaldson being mocked by both his colleagues and the inmates alike upon the realization that he is the inspiration for one of the characters. This leads to Rogers' suspension. Meanwhile, Suzanne is taken by surprise when she discovers that one of her more prolific fans, Maureen Kukudio, is actually interested in her romantically. Suzanne seeks advice from Lorna about how to respond; she admits she finds Maureen attractive, but she has never had a girlfriend before and subsequently feels she must back away from a sexual liaison. In the season finale, Suzanne assists Poussey and Taystee in caring for Brook Soso, whom they discover unconscious from a drug overdose, and develops a closer bond with Maureen in the final scene, owing to a misunderstanding over a turtle that bites Maureen's foot.

=== Season 4 ===
In season 4, it is revealed that Suzanne's crime was the kidnapping and involuntary manslaughter of a boy named Dylan she grew friendly with while working as a store greeter. She came across him playing in the park and did not understand the implications of her actions when she invited him to her apartment for ice cream and video games. Dylan soon started to panic and called 911, and, while trying to get away from an increasingly agitated Suzanne, stepped onto the fire escape and fell to his death. It is mentioned that she took a plea deal. When the inmates take advantage of a temporary lack of security and enjoy the nearby lake and woods, Kukudio insists that she and Suzanne run away together. Suzanne refuses and their relationship becomes rocky. In "People Persons", CO Humphrey commands the two of them to fight. Suzanne rejects this but Maureen, who wants to fight, provokes her by launching into a stream of insults. Suzanne fully retaliates by throwing Maureen to the ground and beating her repeatedly, until the Dominicans pull her off. Suzanne feels guilty for hurting Maureen, and punishes herself. She demonstrates this especially when a peaceful protest in the jail cafeteria turns into a chaotic scene and Poussey Washington dies by suffocation. Whilst the inmates grieve over her death, Suzanne believes that Poussey is alive and tries numerous times to suffocate herself. Finally, she is sent to Medical and is placed in a bed next to Kukudio.

=== Season 5 ===
In season five, Suzanne continues to recover from her injuries and also goes out of her way to help Maureen, whose injuries are severe. The chaos of the riot prevents the consistency she is used to and has a hard time adjusting. Other inmates try to mimic the consistency for her at times. She continues to believe that Poussey's spirit is trying to talk to her and performs a seance on the spot in the cafeteria where Poussey died. Lorna and Nicky take over the dispensation of meds; Lorna refuses to give Suzanne hers, pressuring her to believe she no longer needs them. As a result, Suzanne's grasp on reality soon spirals out of control, especially when she tears down fiberboard in the dorm ceiling, trying to find "heaven". Cindy intervenes but, not knowing the correct prescriptions, feeds Suzanne lithium instead. Suzanne becomes catatonic but is subsequently revived by an epipen.

=== Season 6 ===
At the beginning of Season 6, during the aftermath of the riot, Suzanne is being interrogated about the riot but, due to not using her medication, has hallucinations and does not coherently answer the questions. She finally gets her medication and is released to general population after being in Administrative Segregation (Ad Seg). She is sent to B Block which is nicknamed "Florida" because it is for the elderly and mentally ill prisoners. When the prison restarts the kickball league that had been discontinued years before, she joins and quickly becomes a star player.

== Critical commentary ==
According to Tom Meltzer of The Guardian, "Shakespeare-quoting loner 'Crazy Eyes' invites pity, shock, reproach and belly-laughs in equal measure." The Huffington Post Canada entertainment editor Chris Jancelewicz, noted that after the first six episodes of season two, he was impressed by this appropriately nicknamed character: "Girl is crazy, and Aduba is genuinely frightening in the role. You can't tell if she's harmless or secretly plotting Piper's death".

Aduba won Outstanding Guest Actress in a Comedy Series at the 66th Primetime Creative Arts Emmy Awards as well as Best Guest Performer in a Comedy Series at the 4th Critics' Choice Television Awards and was nominated for Best Supporting Actress – Series, Miniseries or Television Film at the 18th Satellite Awards for her season 1 performance.

Aduba's season 2 performance earned her the Outstanding Performance by a Female Actor in a Comedy Series at the 21st Screen Actors Guild Awards and a nomination Best Supporting Actress – Series, Miniseries or Television Film at the 72nd Golden Globe Awards. At the 67th Primetime Emmy Awards, due to recent rule changes, the show was forced to compete as a drama series rather than a comedy one and Aduba was nominated and won for Outstanding Supporting Actress in a Drama Series. Previously, Lou Grant played by Ed Asner was the only character for whom an actor had won both drama and comedy Emmy recognition (but in different shows). She also earned a nomination at the 46th NAACP Image Awards for Outstanding Actress in a Comedy Series.

Aduba's season 3 performance earned another Outstanding Performance by a Female Actor in a Comedy Series win for the 22nd Screen Actors Guild Awards. She earned a second nomination for Outstanding Actress in a Comedy Series at the 47th NAACP Image Awards. She also earned a Best Supporting Actress – Series, Miniseries or Television Film at the 73rd Golden Globe Awards.

At the 69th Primetime Emmy Awards, Aduba was again nominated for the Primetime Emmy Award for Outstanding Supporting Actress in a Drama Series.

== See also ==
- List of Orange Is the New Black characters
