= Piper Chapman =

Fictional character

- Orange Is the New Black character
- Taylor Schilling as Piper Chapman in a promotional poster for Orange Is the New Black
- First appearance: "I Wasn't Ready" (2013)
- Last appearance: "Here's Where We Get Off" (2019)
- Portrayed by: Taylor Schilling; Clare Foley (young)

In-universe information
- Nicknames: Chapman; Pipes; Dandelion; Gapman; College; Vanilla
- Occupation: Barista at Starbucks; Assistant Accountant (former); Waitress (former); PoPi Co-owner (former); Public Relations Executive (former); Teaching Assistant (former)
- Family: Carol Chapman (mother); Bill Chapman (father); Cal Chapman (brother); Celeste Chapman (grandmother)
- Significant others: Alex Vause (wife); Larry Bloom (ex-fiancé)
- Nationality: American
- Education: Smith College (BA)

Piper Elizabeth Chapman (played by Taylor Schilling) is the protagonist of the Netflix series Orange Is the New Black. The character is based on Piper Kerman, author of the non-fiction book Orange Is the New Black: My Year in a Women's Prison, upon which the series is based. Schilling was nominated for awards in both comedy and drama categories for this role.

== Basis ==
A Boston-born Smith College grad, Piper Kerman got involved in a relationship with an international drug smuggler, Catherine Cleary Wolters. Chapman's girlfriend in the series, Alex Vause, is based on Wolters, whom Kerman met circa 1991 in Northampton, Massachusetts. Eventually, 24-year-old Kerman flew a suitcase of money from the United States to Belgium for a West African drug lord and was named five years later as part of the drug ring. As part of her plea bargain, she declared that she made three overseas trips on behalf of the drug ring. After breaking up with Wolters, Kerman met Larry Smith and got engaged before being charged with felonious money laundering in 1998 and striking a deal. She spent 13 months in a Danbury, Connecticut women's prison, FCI Danbury. Kerman actually had a six-year delay between being sentenced to prison and entering prison in 2004. The show is based on Kerman's 2010 book Orange Is the New Black: My Year in a Women's Prison about her year in a minimum security federal women's prison. Chapman's fiancé, Larry Bloom, is based on Smith, Kerman's real life boyfriend and eventual husband.

Series creator Jenji Kohan had initially considered casting Katie Holmes in the role, but decided against it as Holmes had too many commitments. Ultimately Kohan cast Taylor Schilling.

== Characterization ==
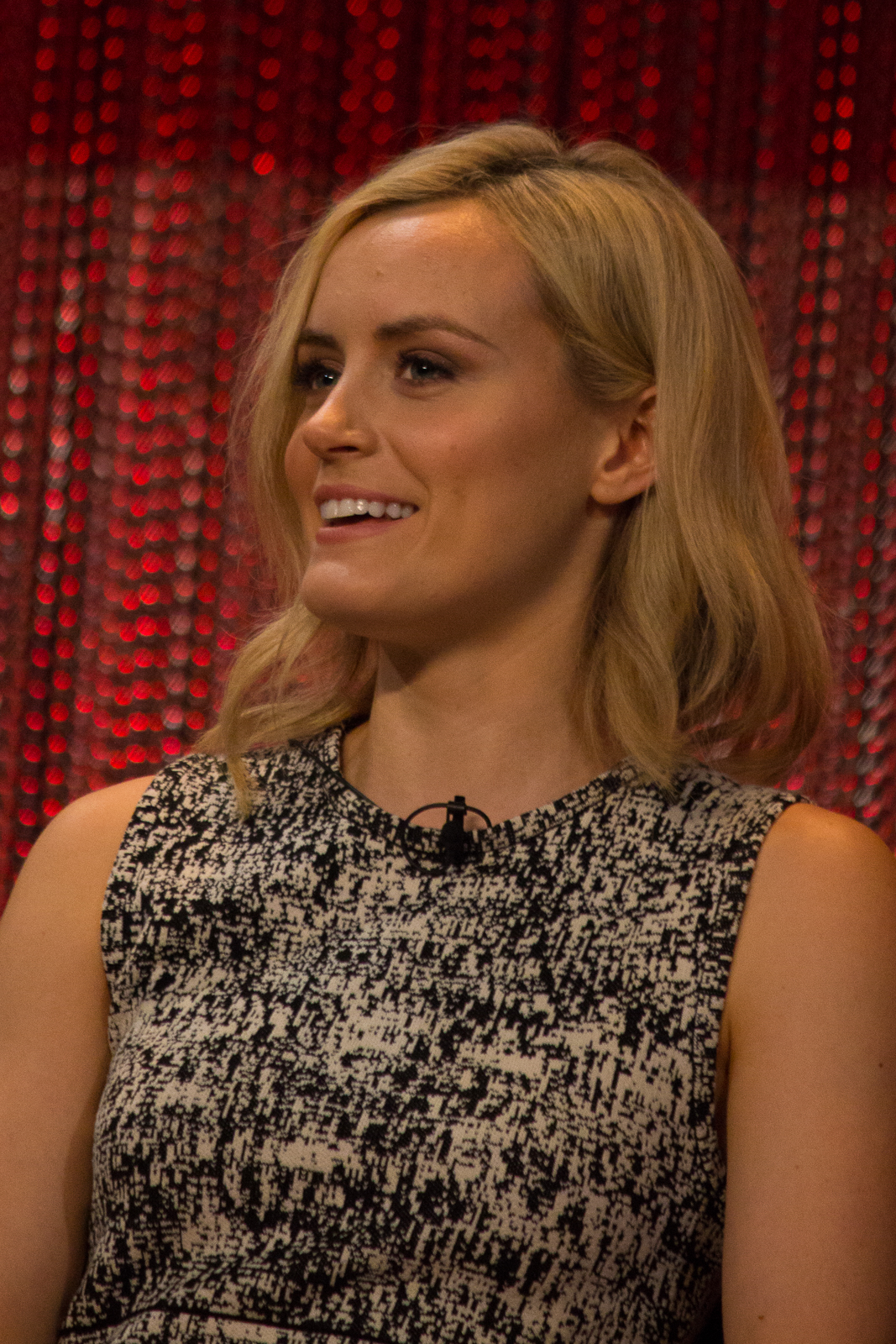
Taylor Schilling plays Piper Chapman

Chapman is a 31-year-old woman who is sentenced to 15 months in prison for carrying a bag of drug-money ($50,000) to Belgium for her girlfriend, Alex Vause. Prior to prison, Chapman owned an artisanal bath soap business in Brooklyn. She comes from a wealthy family, and was a debutante as a teenager. She is originally from Connecticut. Chapman is bisexual, and in college was in a relationship with Alex Vause (Laura Prepon), a drug smuggler. 10 years prior to the series' beginning, she carried drug money from Colombia to Belgium with Vause. Eventually, Chapman grew disenchanted with Vause's lifestyle and broke up with her. She then began dating Larry Bloom (Jason Biggs), to whom she got engaged.

Piper is one of very few emphatically atheist inmates on a television show that highlights the theme of issues around American religious freedom. For instance, in season 1 episode 12 she responds to a request that she be baptized by saying that she cannot pretend to believe in a god, saying that while it might make her happier if she believed in a religion, she "needs it to be true", and instead looks to science to explain the world. Earlier in that same episode, she had clarified that "Well, I've always thought agnostic was sort of a cop-out... If I had to label it I'd say that I'm a secular humanist which is not to say I'm not spiritual".

In 2018, Schilling stated that while Walter White of Breaking Bad was written with having a rationale for each action, "Piper's behavior oftentimes feels groundless" and "the audience can't quite grab onto Piper's behavior. It seems like it's coming out of nowhere."

== Storylines ==
=== Season 1 ===
Chapman is sentenced to 15 months in Litchfield Prison, for criminal conspiracy and money laundering; Vause had been arrested and named Chapman as an accomplice in order to reduce her own sentence. On Chapman's first day, Chapman gets felt up by guard George "Pornstache" Mendez (Pablo Schreiber) and unintentionally offends prison matriarch Red (Kate Mulgrew), who runs the prison cafeteria. Red starves Chapman to make an example of her, and the other inmates are too intimidated to help except for Crazy Eyes (Uzo Aduba). Nonetheless, Chapman resists Crazy Eyes' subsequent advances and makes amends with Red by making her lotion to help her painful back. Chapman befriends Nicky Nichols (Natasha Lyonne), who becomes her confidante and protector. Chapman also discovers Vause has also been sentenced to Litchfield.

Chapman is assigned to the prison's electrical workshop and accidentally pockets a screwdriver. Her cellmate, Miss Claudette (Michelle Hurst), helps her evade the guards' searches. In order to ingratiate herself with the other inmates, Chapman offers to review their appeal letters.

Although Bloom learns that Vause was the informant who gave Chapman up, he does not share this information with his fiancée. Chapman then rekindles her relationship with Vause. Meanwhile, Bloom, an aspiring writer, publishes a story about Chapman's incarceration that paints unflattering portraits of her fellow inmates and the prison staff. The article earns Chapman the ire of both the guards and the other prisoners, and severely strains on her already fading relationship with Bloom.

Chapman is elected to the prison council but finds that the only change she is able to make is to get the track reopened for Janae Watson (Vicky Jeudy), who was put in solitary confinement during the screwdriver incident. Chapman makes an enemy of Tiffany "Pennsatucky" Doggett (Taryn Manning), who wanted her spot on the council. Doggett tells the inmate counselor Sam Healy (Michael J. Harney) about Chapman and Vause's relationship; Healy punishes Chapman by putting her in solitary confinement and telling Bloom about the affair. Bloom gets back at Chapman by doing an interview on NPR that casts Litchfield in a harsh light, which makes her even more unpopular. During an angry phone call, Bloom reveals that Vause informed on her.

Vause asks Chapman to choose between her and Bloom. Chapman chooses Bloom, but Vause breaks them up and spurns Chapman. When Doggett attacks Chapman with a shiv, Chapman finally snaps and beats her to a pulp.

=== Season 2 ===
After spending a month in solitary confinement, Chapman is flown to Chicago to serve as a witness against the drug kingpin who had been Vause's boss. There, she spends time in a maximum security prison with dangerous inmates who menace her.

=== Season 3 ===
Chapman begins a business selling used panties to people outside of Litchfield, enlisting her brother Cal as her middleman. Chapman begins a romantic relationship with an Australian prisoner, Stella (Ruby Rose Langenheim). After Stella steals Chapman's money, she plants contraband in Stella's bunk and orchestrates her being sent to the maximum security unit in retaliation the day before Stella's release date.

=== Season 4 ===
Chapman continues her panty business but finds herself in competition with a group of Dominicans led by Maria Ruiz. When Chapman aligns herself with a gang of white supremacists and plants contraband in Maria's bunk, Maria retaliates by kidnapping her and having her branded with a swastika.

=== Season 7 ===
Now out of prison, Piper struggles to adjust to her new lifestyle on the outside.

== Critical commentary ==
According to Emily VanDerWerff of Vox Media's Vox.com Chapman was a character with "tricky contradictions and likability issues". In reviewing season 1, Matthew Wolfson Slant Magazine describes Chapman as "a familiar vessel through which to comprehend prison's unfamiliar terrain". Over the course of the first season, the show becomes less focused on Chapman, according to James Poniewozik of Time. The Boston Globe describes Chapman's assimilation into prison as a display of "Martha Stewart-like efforts to survive". At the time of the Golden Globe Award nomination, Entertainment Weekly described Chapman in prison as a woman who was "totally out of her element" and said that the role was dichotomous with demands to "vacillate between being sympathy-worthy and trying fans’ patience with Chapman's entitlement". Tom Meltzer of The Guardian wrote "Chapman's romantic and rebellious re-awakening drives the show, but it is the ensemble that kept us coming back for more".

By season 2, Piper remained a main character of an ensemble cast but not the central character according to IGN's Matt Fowler. Liz Raftery of TV Guide says "There's a lot going on in Season 2 of Netflix's Orange Is the New Black, and very little of it has to do with Piper Chapman". Rob Sheffield of Rolling Stone considered that the show's ensemble focus has turned Piper into "dead weight" and "nobody would argue that an early parole for her would hurt the show". As he reviewed season 2, The Huffington Post Canada entertainment editor Chris Jancelewicz, opined that "Schilling's deadpan expressions and snap comedic timing help us empathize and grow to love her" as her character became more understandable. Alicia Lutes of MTV wrote that as of Season 2 the show is about Piper understanding herself and her capabilities better "even if those abilities put her further in the muck" and not about her possible reformation.

Sarene Leeds of The Wall Street Journal stated that in Season 3 Piper changed from being "a gangsta wannabe into a dangerous villain that is not to be crossed" after planting contraband in girlfriend Stella's bed to get her sent to the maximum security unit in retaliation for Stella stealing from her; Leeds argued that the change "is a necessary plot device to keep things interesting" even though she did not like the new version of Piper. Drew Millard of Vice wrote that Season 3 Piper went "completely off the deep end" and changed "into the most unlikable version of herself", making her "deadweight on a show that was at first strictly about her." Kerman stated that even though she still found the series to be entertaining, she could no longer relate to Piper Chapman. Sadie Gennis of TV Guide also suggested removing Chapman from the show.

== Awards and nominations ==
Schilling has been nominated for awards in both comedy and drama categories: Outstanding Lead Actress in a Comedy Series at the 66th Primetime Emmy Awards and Best Actress – Television Series Drama at the 71st Golden Globe Awards and won Best Actress – Television Series Musical or Comedy at the 18th Satellite Awards for her season 1 performance. Her season 2 performance earned a 72nd Golden Globe Awards nomination for Best Actress – Television Series Musical or Comedy, and a 19th Satellite Awards nomination for Best Actress – Television Series Musical or Comedy. Her season 3 performance won Best Actress – Television Series Musical or Comedy at the 20th Satellite Awards.

== See also ==
- List of Orange Is the New Black characters
