= List of Orange Is the New Black episodes =

Orange Is the New Black is an American comedy-drama television series created by Jenji Kohan for Netflix. The series, based on Piper Kerman's memoir Orange Is the New Black: My Year in a Women's Prison (2010), follows Piper Chapman (Taylor Schilling). A happily engaged New Yorker, Chapman is suddenly sent to a women's federal prison for transporting a suitcase full of drug money across international borders 10 years prior for her girlfriend at the time, Alex Vause (Laura Prepon).

During the course of the series, 91 episodes of Orange Is the New Black were released over seven seasons, between July 13, 2013, and July 26, 2019.

== Series overview ==
Season	Episodes	Originally released
1	13	July 11, 2013
2	13	June 6, 2014
3	13	June 11, 2015
4	13	June 17, 2016
5	13	June 9, 2017
6	13	July 27, 2018
7	13	July 26, 2019

== Episodes ==
=== Season 1 (2013) ===
No. overall	No. in season	Title	Directed by	Written by	Featured character(s)	Original release date
1	1	"I Wasn't Ready"	Michael Trim	Liz Friedman & Jenji Kohan	Piper	July 11, 2013
2	2	"Tit Punch"	Uta Briesewitz	Marco Ramirez	Red & Piper	July 11, 2013
3	3	"Lesbian Request Denied"	Jodie Foster	Sian Heder	Sophia & Piper	July 11, 2013
4	4	"Imaginary Enemies"	Michael Trim	Gary Lennon	Miss Claudette	July 11, 2013
5	5	"The Chickening"	Andrew McCarthy	Nick Jones	Aleida & Daya	July 11, 2013
6	6	"WAC Pack"	Michael Trim	Lauren Morelli	Nicky & Piper	July 11, 2013
7	7	"Blood Donut"	Matthew Penn	Sara Hess	Janae	July 11, 2013
8	8	"Moscow Mule"	Phil Abraham	Marco Ramirez	Red	July 11, 2013
9	9	"Fucksgiving"	Michael Trim	Sian Heder	Alex	July 11, 2013
10	10	"Bora Bora Bora"	Andrew McCarthy	Nick Jones	Piper & Tricia	July 11, 2013
11	11	"Tall Men with Feelings"	Constantine Makris	Lauren Morelli	Piper & Alex	July 11, 2013
12	12	"Fool Me Once"	Andrew McCarthy	Sara Hess	Pennsatucky	July 11, 2013
13	13	"Can't Fix Crazy"	Michael Trim	Tara Herrmann & Jenji Kohan	none	July 11, 2013

=== Season 2 (2014) ===
No. overall	No. in season	Title	Directed by	Written by	Featured character(s)	Original release date
14	1	"Thirsty Bird"	Jodie Foster	Tara Herrmann & Jenji Kohan	Piper	June 6, 2014
15	2	"Looks Blue, Tastes Red"	Michael Trim	Jenji Kohan	Taystee	June 6, 2014
16	3	"Hugs Can Be Deceiving"	Michael Trim	Lauren Morelli	Suzanne	June 6, 2014
17	4	"A Whole Other Hole"	Phil Abraham	Sian Heder	Lorna	June 6, 2014
18	5	"Low Self Esteem City"	Andrew McCarthy	Nick Jones	Gloria	June 6, 2014
19	6	"You Also Have a Pizza"	Allison Anders	Stephen Falk	Poussey	June 6, 2014
20	7	"Comic Sans"	Andrew McCarthy	Sara Hess	Cindy	June 6, 2014
21	8	"Appropriately Sized Pots"	Daisy von Scherler Mayer	Alex Regnery & Hartley Voss	Rosa	June 6, 2014
22	9	"40 Oz. of Furlough"	S. J. Clarkson	Lauren Morelli	Red & Vee	June 6, 2014
23	10	"Little Mustachioed Shit"	Jennifer Getzinger	Sian Heder	Piper & Alex	June 6, 2014
24	11	"Take a Break from Your Values"	Constantine Makris	Nick Jones	Sister Ingalls	June 6, 2014
25	12	"It Was the Change"	Phil Abraham	Sara Hess	Vee	June 6, 2014
26	13	"We Have Manners. We're Polite."	Constantine Makris	Jenji Kohan	none	June 6, 2014

=== Season 3 (2015) ===
No. overall	No. in season	Title	Directed by	Written by	Featured character(s)	Original release date
27	1	"Mother's Day"	Andrew McCarthy	Jenji Kohan	various	June 11, 2015
28	2	"Bed Bugs and Beyond"	Constantine Makris	Jim Danger Gray	Bennett	June 11, 2015
29	3	"Empathy Is a Boner Killer"	Michael Trim	Nick Jones	Nicky	June 11, 2015
30	4	"Finger in the Dyke"	Constantine Makris	Lauren Morelli	Big Boo	June 11, 2015
31	5	"Fake It Till You Fake It Some More"	Nicole Holofcener	Tara Herrmann	Flaca	June 11, 2015
32	6	"Ching Chong Chang"	Anthony Hemingway	Sara Hess	Chang	June 11, 2015
33	7	"Tongue-Tied"	Julie Anne Robinson	Sian Heder	Norma	June 11, 2015
34	8	"Fear, and Other Smells"	Mark A. Burley	Nick Jones	Alex	June 11, 2015
35	9	"Where My Dreidel At"	Andrew McCarthy	Jordan Harrison	Leanne	June 11, 2015
36	10	"A Tittin' and a Hairin'"	Jesse Peretz	Lauren Morelli	Pennsatucky	June 11, 2015
37	11	"We Can Be Heroes"	Phil Abraham	Sian Heder	Caputo	June 11, 2015
38	12	"Don't Make Me Come Back There"	Uta Briesewitz	Sara Hess	Aleida & Daya	June 11, 2015
39	13	"Trust No Bitch"	Phil Abraham	Jim Danger Gray & Jenji Kohan	various	June 11, 2015

=== Season 4 (2016) ===
No. overall	No. in season	Title	Directed by	Written by	Featured character(s)	Original release date
40	1	"Work That Body for Me"	Andrew McCarthy	Jenji Kohan	none	June 17, 2016
41	2	"Power Suit"	Constantine Makris	Sara Hess	Maria	June 17, 2016
42	3	"(Don't) Say Anything"	Andrew McCarthy	Jim Danger Gray	Soso	June 17, 2016
43	4	"Doctor Psycho"	Erin Feeley	Carly Mensch	Healy	June 17, 2016
44	5	"We'll Always Have Baltimore"	Tricia Brock	Jordan Harrison	Maritza	June 17, 2016
45	6	"Piece of Shit"	Uta Briesewitz	Lauren Morelli	none	June 17, 2016
46	7	"It Sounded Nicer in My Head"	Mark A. Burley	Nick Jones	Lolly	June 17, 2016
47	8	"Friends in Low Places"	Phil Abraham	Alex Regnery & Hartley Voss	none	June 17, 2016
48	9	"Turn Table Turn"	Constantine Makris	Sara Hess	Blanca	June 17, 2016
49	10	"Bunny, Skull, Bunny, Skull"	Phil Abraham	Carly Mensch	none	June 17, 2016
50	11	"People Persons"	Lev L. Spiro	Nick Jones	Suzanne	June 17, 2016
51	12	"The Animals"	Matthew Weiner	Lauren Morelli	Bayley	June 17, 2016
52	13	"Toast Can't Never Be Bread Again"	Adam Bernstein	Tara Herrmann & Jenji Kohan	Poussey	June 17, 2016

=== Season 5 (2017) ===
No. overall	No. in season	Title	Directed by	Written by	Featured character(s)	Original release date
53	1	"Riot FOMO"	Andrew McCarthy	Jenji Kohan	none	June 9, 2017
54	2	"Fuck, Marry, Frieda"	Constantine Makris	Jordan Harrison	Frieda	June 9, 2017
55	3	"Pissters!"	Phil Abraham	Rebecca Angelo & Lauren Schuker Blum	Linda	June 9, 2017
56	4	"Litchfield's Got Talent"	Nick Sandow	Josh Koenigsberg, Jenji Kohan & Tara Herrmann	Alison	June 9, 2017
57	5	"Sing It, White Effie"	Phil Abraham	Molly Smith Metzler	Janae	June 9, 2017
58	6	"Flaming Hot Cheetos, Literally"	Andrew McCarthy	Lauren Morelli	Taystee	June 9, 2017
59	7	"Full Bush, Half Snickers"	Uta Briesewitz	Anthony Natoli	none	June 9, 2017
60	8	"Tied to the Tracks"	Michael Trim	Carolina Paiz	Daya	June 9, 2017
61	9	"The Tightening"	Erin Feeley	Jordan Harrison	Red	June 9, 2017
62	10	"The Reverse Midas Touch"	Laura Prepon	Rebecca Angelo & Lauren Schuker Blum	Piscatella	June 9, 2017
63	11	"Breaking the Fiberboard Ceiling"	Wendey Stanzler	Lauren Morelli	none	June 9, 2017
64	12	"Tattoo You"	Mark A. Burley	Tara Herrmann & Carolina Paiz	Piper & Alex	June 9, 2017
65	13	"Storm-y Weather"	Jesse Peretz	Lauren Morelli	none	June 9, 2017

=== Season 6 (2018) ===
No. overall	No. in season	Title	Directed by	Written by	Featured character(s)	Original release date
66	1	"Who Knows Better Than I"	Michael Trim	Jenji Kohan	Suzanne & Cindy	July 27, 2018
67	2	"Sh*tstorm Coming"	Mark A. Burley	Brian Chamberlayne	Cindy	July 27, 2018
68	3	"Look Out for Number One"	Erin Feeley	Hilary Weisman Graham	Frieda	July 27, 2018
69	4	"I'm the Talking Ass"	Phil Abraham	Tami Sagher	Nicky	July 27, 2018
70	5	"Mischief Mischief"	Andrew McCarthy	Anthony Natoli	none	July 27, 2018
71	6	"State of the Uterus"	Constantine Makris	Merritt Tierce	Daddy	July 27, 2018
72	7	"Changing Winds"	Andrew McCarthy	Heather Jeng Bladt	Badison	July 27, 2018
73	8	"Gordons"	Sian Heder	Vera Santamaria	Taystee & Tamika	July 27, 2018
74	9	"Break the String"	Nick Sandow	Kirsa Rein	none	July 27, 2018
75	10	"Chocolate Chip Nookie"	Ludovic Littee	Carolina Paiz	Carol & Barb	July 27, 2018
76	11	"Well This Took a Dark Turn"	Laura Prepon	Anthony Natoli	none	July 27, 2018
77	12	"Double Trouble"	Clark Johnson	Hilary Weisman Graham	none	July 27, 2018
78	13	"Be Free"	Nick Sandow	Brian Chamberlayne	Carol & Barb	July 27, 2018

=== Season 7 (2019) ===
No. overall	No. in season	Title	Directed by	Written by	Featured character(s)	Original release date
79	1	"Beginning of the End"	Michael Trim	Jenji Kohan	Piper	July 26, 2019
80	2	"Just Desserts"	Andrew McCarthy	Brian Chamberlayne	McCullough	July 26, 2019
81	3	"And Brown Is the New Orange"	Constantine Makris	Vera Santamaria	Blanca	July 26, 2019
82	4	"How to Do Life"	Andrew McCarthy	Merritt Tierce	Gloria	July 26, 2019
83	5	"Minority Deport"	Laura Prepon	Anthony Natoli	Aleida	July 26, 2019
84	6	"Trapped in an Elevator"	Nick Sandow	Heather Jeng Bladt	Maria	July 26, 2019
85	7	"Me as Well"	Ludovic Littee	Tami Sagher	Pennsatucky	July 26, 2019
86	8	"Baker's Dozen"	Nick Sandow	Kirsa Rein	Red	July 26, 2019
87	9	"The Hidey Hole"	Natasha Lyonne	Hilary Weisman Graham	Lorna	July 26, 2019
88	10	"The Thirteenth"	Erin Feeley	Merritt Tierce	Alex	July 26, 2019
89	11	"God Bless America"	Diego Velasco	Carolina Paiz	Karla, Shani & Santos	July 26, 2019
90	12	"The Big House"	Phil Abraham	Brian Chamberlayne	Taystee	July 26, 2019
91	13	"Here's Where We Get Off"	Mark A. Burley	Jenji Kohan	none	July 26, 2019

== See also ==
- List of Orange Is the New Black characters
