= Keys Open Doors =

Keys Open Doors may refer to:

- "Keys Open Doors", an episode of American TV series You're the Worst
- "Keys Open Doors", a song by Clipse from their album Hell Hath No Fury
