= Spoonbenders (novel) =

2017 novel by Daryl Gregory

- Author: Daryl Gregory
- Language: English
- Subjects: Psychic Powers
- Genre: Fantasy
- Publisher: Knopf
- Publication date: 2017
- Media type: Print (Hardback)
- Pages: 416
- ISBN: 978-1-524-73182-3

Spoonbenders is a fantasy novel by American writer Daryl Gregory, published in 2017 by Knopf. It follows the rise and fall of the Telemachus family as its members, each with his or her own unique telekinetic or clairvoyant ability, navigate lives filled with frustrations, hilarity and intrigue.

== Background ==
Spoonbenders is Daryl Gregory's seventh novel and was inspired by Uri Geller and others who, in the 1970s, appeared on popular television shows claiming to have psychic powers. The title of the book comes from Geller's stage trick of bending spoons. Gregory, who grew up in Chicago, Illinois and now lives in Oakland, California, wanted to write a book that was neither science fiction or fantasy like his previous books. To research the book, Gregory participated in a spoon bending seminar in Los Angeles, California. He attributed the bending more to strength than psychic ability. "It just struck me that it's the saddest of the psychic powers. Does anyone really need bent cutlery? There's something about the small scale of it. They're not changing the world. They're just bending spoons." Still, he told a reporter of Californian newspaper The Mercury News of his writing process, "I'm never really happy until something weird intrudes". Gregory, describes himself as "really boring and a skeptic about this stuff". He reminds readers at the end of Spoonbenders that "None of it's real, folks."

== Overview ==
Spoonbenders follows the lives of a "somewhat dysfunctional and often hilarious" Telemachus family. The main characters include: Teddy Telemachus, the patriarch (a con man); Maureen, his wife (a powerful psychic); their three children Irene (a human lie detector), Frankie (a telekinetic), and Buddy (a person who can foretell the future); and Matty, Irene's son who can travel outside his body when sexually aroused by thoughts of his cousin Mary Alice (nicknamed Malice).

The story line of Spoonbenders moves back and forth between the 1960s, when Teddy and Maureen meet in a classified ESP study, and the 1990s, when their three children are coping with life and the death of their mother. In the early days, the Telemachus family toured as a group showing off their superpowers. This early success is thwarted when they participate on a television show and are debunked, James Randi style, and discredited. As adult children, Irene, Frankie, and Buddy are struggling to cope. Irene's lie detecting abilities have ruined her relationships, Frankie's telekinesis, rather than help him, has gotten him in trouble with the mob with a get rich scheme, and Buddy's "memory of the future" has left him verbally paralyzed (he does not want to upset the future) and digging holes in his father's backyard. Irene's 14-year-old son, Matty, too, develops out-of-body experiences while spying on his step-cousin, Mary Alice, and masturbating. Along with threats from the mob, the family is being investigated by a government agent who had worked with Maureen years earlier.

== Reception ==
The novel was nominated for the 2018 Nebula Award.

Spoonbenders has received positive reviews from critics who describe it as an unexpectedly funny, charming, touching, and "fascinating glimpse" into the lives of people who believe they have psychic powers: a magical magic trick of sorts.

Gary K. Wolfe, of the Chicago Tribune, wrote: "Gregory makes excellent use of the comic potential of hapless superpowers and sets up some intriguing mysteries, but mostly the novel is a celebration of family love and self-protection."

The New York Times reviewer, Manual Gonzales, while favorable to the book overall, found the story lacking in a few places when Gregory "sped through moments that should linger" and "left loose ends untied". He noted that Maureen McKinnon's storyline could have been developed further. While Amal El-Mohtar of NPR found Matty's behavior toward his step-cousin "sleazy and not endearing", Gonzales mentioned that Mary Alice (Malice), "spends most of the novel gothy and removed" and then shows up in the final act of the book sympathetic, forgiving, and willing to "help Matty project".

== Adaptations ==
As of September 2019, You're the Worst showrunner Stephen Falk has been developing a pilot development for Showtime.
