= Daryl Gregory =

American science fiction, fantasy and comic book author

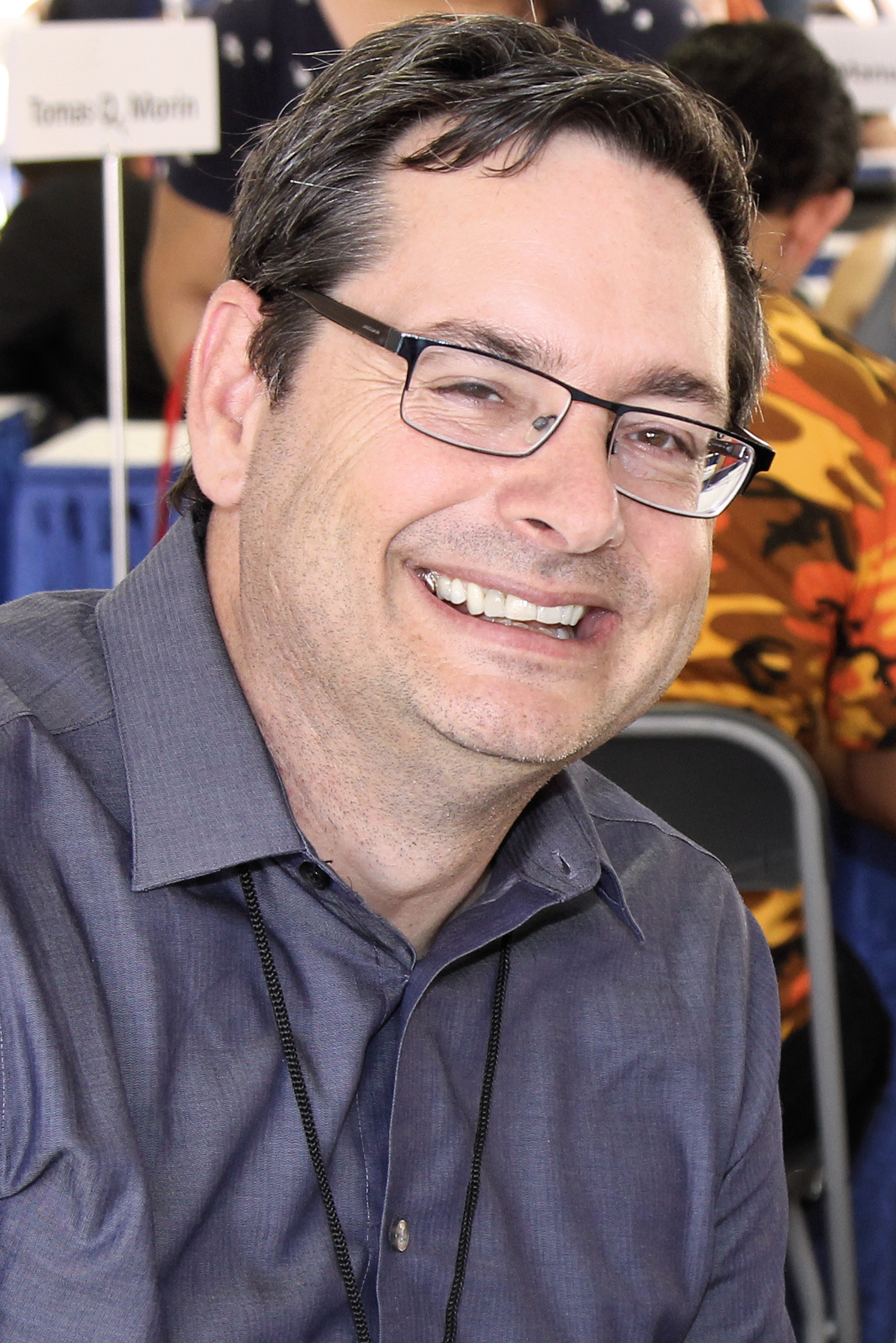
- Gregory at the 2017 Texas Book Festival
- Born: 1965 (age 60–61); Chicago, Illinois, U.S.
- Education: Illinois State University; Michigan State University
- Occupation: Author
- Spouse: Kathleen Bieschke (m. 1987)
- Writing career
- Genres: Science fiction; fantasy; comic book
- Website: darylgregory.com

Daryl Gregory (born 1965) is an American science fiction, fantasy and comic book author. Gregory is a 1988 alumnus of the Michigan State University Clarion science fiction workshop, and won the 2009 Crawford Award for his novel Pandemonium.

== Personal life ==
Daryl Gregory was born and raised in Chicago, Illinois, with his two sisters. He graduated from Illinois State University in 1987 with majors in English and theater. That same year, he married Kathleen Bieschke. After graduation, he taught high school in Michigan for three years, before moving to Salt Lake City, when Bieschke got a job at University of Utah. Bieschke then was hired by Penn State, and the couple moved to State College, where Gregory was employed by Minitab. The couple divorced in 2016 and remarried in 2024. They have two adult children, Emma and Ian. For several years Gregory lived on the west coast, in Oakland, California, Seattle, Washington, and Piedmont, California, and in 2023 moved back to Seattle, Washington.

== Career ==
Gregory at World Fantasy Convention 2026

Gregory's first sale was to the Magazine of Fantasy and Science Fiction in 1990, the short story "In the Wheels". His first novel, Pandemonium, was published by Del Rey Books in 2008, for which he won the 2009 Crawford Award for best first fantasy book. Pandemonium was also nominated for the World Fantasy Award, the Mythopoeic Awards and the Shirley Jackson Award. His second novel, The Devil's Alphabet was published by Del Rey Books in 2009. The Devil's Alphabet was named one of the best books of 2009 by Publishers Weekly. It was additionally nominated for the Philip K. Dick Award in 2010. In 2011, his third novel, Raising Stony Mayhall, was published and was named one of the best science fiction books of the year by Library Journal The same year, a short story collection entitled Unpossible and Other Stories was published by Fairwood Press. Publishers Weekly named Unpossible one of the five best science fiction books of the year.

Gregory was hired by Boom! Studios in 2010 to co-write Dracula: Company of Monsters with Kurt Busiek. He was additionally hired to write the Planet of the Apes tie-in comic starting in August 2011. IDW hired Gregory to write The Secret Battles of Genghis Khan, a stand-alone graphic novel published in March 2013.

Neuro-SF novel Afterparty was published by Tor Books in April 2014 and picked up by Titan Books in the UK. The novella "We Are All Completely Fine", published by Tachyon Publications in August, 2014, was a Nebula Award finalist, and won the 2015 World Fantasy Award for Best Novella, as well as the Shirley Jackson Award. Gregory also published a young-adult novel, Harrison Squared (Tor Books), in March 2015.

The literary speculative novel Spoonbenders was published by Knopf on June 27, 2017. Spoonbenders is being developed for television Berlanti Productions.

Novelette “Nine Last Days on Planet Earth” was published on 9/19/18 by Tor.com, and was a finalist for the Hugo Award for Best Novelette. Novella The Album of Dr. Moreau was published in May 2021 by Tor.com. Appalachian horror novel Revelator was published by Knopf in August 2021.

== Bibliography ==
=== Novels ===
- Pandemonium (Del Rey Books, 2008)
- The Devil's Alphabet (Del Rey Books, 2009)
- Raising Stony Mayhall (Del Rey Books, 2011)
- Afterparty (Tor Books, 2014)
- We Are All Completely Fine (novella, Tachyon Publications, 2014)
- Harrison Squared (Tor Books, 2015)
- Spoonbenders (Alfred A. Knopf, 2017)
- The Album of Dr. Moreau (novella, Tor.com, 2021)
- Revelator (Alfred A. Knopf, 2021)
- When We Were Real (Saga Press, 2025)
- The Porcelain Sisters (novella, Tachyon Publications, 2026)

=== Collections ===
- Unpossible and Other Stories (Fairwood Press, 2011)

=== Short stories ===
- "In the Wheels" (Fantasy and Science Fiction Magazine, August 1990)
- "Taking the High Road" (Amazing Magazine, September 1991)
- "The Sound of Glass Breaking" (Antietam Review, Spring 1992)
- "An Equitable Distribution" (Hitchcock's Magazine, October 1997)
- "Free, and Clear" (Fantasy and Science Fiction, February 2004)
- "The Continuing Adventures of Rocket Boy" (Fantasy and Science Fiction, July 2004)
- "Second Person, Present Tense" (Asimov's Science Fiction Magazine, September 2005)
- "Gardening at Night" (Fantasy and Science Fiction Magazine, April 2006)
- "Damascus" (Fantasy and Science Fiction Magazine, December 2006)
- "Dead Horse Point" (Asimov's Science Fiction Magazine, August 2007)
- "Unpossible" (Fantasy and Science Fiction Magazine, October 2007)
- "The Illustrated Biography of Lord Grimm" (Eclipse 2, October 2008)
- "Glass" (Technology Review Magazine, November/December 2008)
- "What We Take When We Take What We Need" (Subterranean Magazine, 2009)
- "Message From the Bubblegum Factory" (in the anthology Masked, formerly known as With Great Power, 2010)
- "Even the Crumbs Were Delicious" (in the anthology The Starlit Wood, 2016)
- "Nine Last Days on Planet Earth" (Tor.com, 2019)
- "Brother Rifle" (in the anthology Made to Order: Robots and Revolution, 2020)
- "Once Upon a Future in the West" (in the anthology Tomorrow's Parties: Life in the Anthropocene, 2022)
- "The Virgin Jimmy Peck" (in the anthology Screams from the Dark: 29 Tales of Monsters and the Monstrous, 2022)
- "I’m Not Disappointed Just Mad AKA The Heaviest Couch in the Known Universe" (Tor.com, 2024)
- "Blind Monkey" (in the anthology Book of the Dead, 2025)

=== Comics and graphic novels ===
Titles published by Boom! Studios include:

- Dracula: Company of Monsters
  - Volume One (collects #1-4, tpb, 2011)
  - Volume Two (collects #5-8, tpb, 2011)
  - Volume Three (collects #9-12, tpb, 2011)
- Planet of the Apes
  - Volume One (collects #1-4, tpb, 2011)
  - Volume Two (collects #5-8, tpb, 2012)
  - Volume Three (collects #9-12, tpb, 2012)
  - Volume Four (collects #13-16, Annual #1 tpb, 2013)
  - Volume Five (collects Planet of the Apes Special, Spectacular, Giant, tpb 2014)
  - Planet of the Apes Omnibus (2018)

Titles Published by IDW include:

- The Secret Battles of Genghis Khan (tpb, 2012)
