= Atomic (TV series) =

British television series

- Genre: Action drama
- Created by: Gregory Burke
- Based on: Atomic Bazaar by William Langewiesche
- Directed by: Shariff Korver
- Starring: Alfie Allen; Shazad Latif; Samira Wiley
- Country of origin: United Kingdom
- Original language: English
- No. of series: 1
- No. of episodes: 5

Production
- Executive producers: Jamie Hall; Judy Counihan; Thomas Benski; Gregory Burke; Sam Hoyle; Megan Spanjian
- Producer: Peter McAleese
- Running time: 43–46 minutes
- Production companies: Pulse Films; Sky Studios

Original release
- Network: Sky Atlantic
- Release: 28 August – 18 September 2025

Atomic is a British action drama television series created by Gregory Burke and based on the non-fiction book Atomic Bazaar by William Langewiesche. The series premiered on 28 August 2025 on Sky Atlantic.

== Cast and characters ==
=== Main ===
- Alfie Allen as Max, a British contraband smuggler operating in North Africa
- Shazad Latif as Mohamed Aziz / JJ, a stateless former ISIS jihadi
- Samira Wiley as Cassie Elliot / Dr. Cassandra Bryce, nuclear physicist and NOC CIA agent

=== Supporting ===
- Nezar Thalal as Carlos, a Venezuelan cartel operative
- Mikhail Safronov as Oleg Kuzayev, Shirokova’s bodyguard
- Avital Lvova as Oksana Shirokova, an international Russian criminal
- Stuart Martin as Robert "Rab" Mackintosh, a British MI6 operative
- Jaeme Vélez as Danny López, a Venezuelan cartel lieutenant
- Mostafa Benkerroum as Rifaat Atallah, a Lebanese smuggling intermediary
- Vahid Gold as Khaled Awad, an American DEA agent based in Beirut
- Franklin Virgüez as Antonio Alam, a Venezuelan cartel leader
- Flavia Fazenda as Maria Garcia, a Venezuelan cartel lieutenant
- Charlie Murphy as Laetitia, Max’s estranged girlfriend
- Brian Gleeson as Mark Ellis, a CIA official
- Akin Gazi as Sayed Ahman, a Turkish nuclear scientist

== Episodes ==
No. in series	Title	Directed by	Written by	Original release date
1	"Al Britani"	Shariff Korver	Gregory Burke	28 August 2025
Russian criminal Oksana Shirokova has enriched uranium transported to Rifaat Atallah in Beirut, who encases it in two statues. Max, a smuggler, is told by his cartel bosses in Guinea-Bissau to drive to Beirut and exchange a shipment of money and drugs for two statues, then take them to Marrakesh. En route he is taken hostage in the Algerian Sahara by JJ, an apparent British jihadist, who kills his own men before forcing Max to divert to Benghazi. When resting at a Bedouin camp, Max thanks JJ for not killing him. They are attacked by JJ’s former group, who burn the money and drugs, but JJ kills the rest of them. Max helps JJ evade Rab Mackintosh, an MI6 operative also in pursuit of him, and persuades him to accompany him to Beirut instead of going to Benghazi. On arrival, Max and JJ are threatened by cartel operative Danny López for losing the shipment. JJ disarms him, and he and Max steal the statues, unaware of their contents. Danny is warned by Rifaat the nuclear material is enough to destroy a whole city.
2	"Baal"	Shariff Korver	Gregory Burke	28 August 2025
JJ and Max escape Danny’s men, and demand cartel leader Antonio Alam pay them to return the statues, not knowing the contents. Cassie Elliot, an American University physics professor and NOC CIA agent, works with DEA agent Khaled Awad, who is investigating the missing uranium that was to be paid for with drugs with Rifaat as his informant. Alam meets with Shirokova, and has his people threaten Max's girlfriend Laetitia. He also warns Max the statues contain uranium and directs them to a nightclub to make the exchange. Whilst there, JJ is unknowingly slipped MDMA by a woman who kisses him and gets high. Danny confronts the two to retrieve the statues, but their location is raided by the DEA and Elliot who are tipped off by Rifaat. During the shootout, Max kills Danny and he and JJ are confronted by Elliot. JJ disarms her and tells her he is "Mohamed Aziz, destroyer of worlds" before the two escape. Alam offers to exchange the statues for Laetitia if Max and JJ go to Syria to be transported to Marrakesh.
3	"The End of Days"	Shariff Korver	Clare McQuillan; Ishy Din	4 September 2025
In 2018, JJ's wife and son are seemingly killed in an airstrike whilst he serves with ISIS. Elliot briefs her CIA superior Mark Ellis about JJ and believes physicist Sayed Ahman is building a bomb from the uranium. After entering Syria, JJ appears to regret being in ISIS and destroying the Temple of Bel. Max stops him committing suicide at his family's grave, confessing the cartel have Laetitia. Elliot and Ellis detain JJ and Max before they are taken by new government troops. Elliot believes the uranium was voluntarily released by the Russian government instead of being stolen. Max explains to the CIA he needs to save Laetitia. Ellis suggests allowing the two to continue their mission, so they can discover who is behind the conspiracy. They meet with Mackintosh, who says JJ's son Kamal is alive and can be used as leverage, provided JJ is given to the UK when the CIA is finished with him. Alam and Shirokova meet with Ahman in Marrakesh, who confirms that aside from missing the uranium, the device is complete.
4	"Little Boy"	Shariff Korver	J.W. Lee	11 September 2025
Max is offered full witness protection, and JJ the chance to see his son, in exchange for completing the deal. JJ warns Max the CIA will treat them as expendable. In Marrakesh, Max offers the first uranium ingot to Alam. However, when Laetitia is threatened, he directs the cartel to JJ with the second ingot. JJ escapes and is warned by Elliot that the CIA will hand him to MI6 and he won't see his son. Laetitia reveals she and Max haven’t been together for years and she is engaged. Elliot is captured and taken to the cartel warehouse, where Ahman says he was recruited by Ellis to make the bomb and he manipulated her to ensure the ingots were delivered. He says the nuke is for the cartel to use as leverage, but he has tricked Ellis into thinking there is a jihadi buyer for the device. Alam orders Max, JJ and Laetitia to be executed in the desert. Garcia, his lieutenant, takes Shirokova prisoner. JJ disarms and kills his, Max and Laetitia’s executioners, but Laetitia drives away. Ahman places the bomb in the Port of Casablanca.
5	"The Path of Totality"	Shariff Korver	Gregory Burke	18 September 2025
Injured in a shootout, JJ plans to bury the uranium in the desert so it can't kill people. He and Max intercept the truck driven by Ahman as it departs Casablanca, fatally injuring him. As he dies, Ahman warns Elliot there is "more than one". Elliot gives them the uranium, agreeing with their strategy. Elliot confronts Ellis, who implies a CIA mission to blame Russia is ongoing. JJ says he will stay in the desert after burying the uranium. Alam plans to return to Guinea-Bissau and shoots Shirokova. JJ considers destroying the uranium by putting it together. The two are intercepted in the desert by Mackintosh, tasked with delivering the uranium to the US. Mackintosh reveals JJ was a mole for the British Army against ISIS, who became a zealot after thinking his son was killed. Cassie avoids assassination by one of Ellis's agents. Mackintosh and his men fight against the CIA, allowing JJ and Max to escape. Confronted at a dead end by Ellis, Mackintosh and the cartel, Max and JJ knock the ingots together as a solar eclipse occurs. An injured Shirokova is rescued by Elliot.

== Production ==
The five-part series is produced by Pulse Films, in association with Sky Studios. The series is directed by Shariff Korver and produced by Peter McAleese. It is written by Gregory Burke and inspired by the non-fiction book Atomic Bazaar by Vanity Fair journalist William Langewiesche. Executive producers include Jamie Hall and Judy Counihan from Pulse Films and Thomas Benski, Gregory Burke, Sam Hoyle, and Megan Spanjian from Sky Studios.

In May 2024, Alfie Allen, Shazad Latif, and Samira Wiley were announced to lead the cast. In July 2025, Brian Gleeson, Franklin Virgüez, Avital Lvova, Stuart Martin, Vahid Gold, and Charlie Murphy were announced to appear in supporting roles.

Filming took place Morocco in the summer of 2024.

== Broadcast ==
The series premiered on 28 August 2025 on Sky Atlantic.
