= Night on Earth (TV series) =

British nature documentary series

- Film poster
- Genre: Nature documentary
- Narrated by: Samira Wiley
- Composer: Edmund Butt
- Country of origin: United Kingdom
- Original language: English
- No. of seasons: 1
- No. of episodes: 6

Production
- Running time: 40-52 minutes
- Production company: Plimsoll Productions

Original release
- Network: Netflix
- Release: 29 January 2020

Night on Earth is a British nature documentary series made for Netflix. The series is narrated by Samira Wiley and produced by Plimsoll Productions. The series follows animals that are active during the night using state of the art, low-light camera technology. All episodes were released on 29 January 2020.

== Episodes ==
No.	Title	Original release date
1	"Moonlit Plains"	29 January 2020
The episode begins on the plains of Africa as a coalition of cheetahs hunt under full moonlight, while a pride of lions also attempt to hunt under the cover of darkness. In the Sonoran Desert of Mexico, the heat of day forces many cacti species to bloom at night, which are pollinated by bats. Beneath the cacti, grasshopper mice hunt giant hairy scorpions. In the coastal deserts of Peru, South American fur seal pups must dodge sea lions and vampire bats. Then, a white lady huntsman spider finds its bearings in the desert while barking geckos use their burrows to amplify their calls to attract mates. Burrowing beneath the dunes of Namibia is a golden mole, while a group of black rhinos visit a water hole.
2	"Frozen Nights"	29 January 2020
A mother polar bear and her cubs search for food in Svalbard, while in Chile, a mother puma also raises her cubs and tries to find food and protect them from males. Then, in an Alaskan forest, a wood frog survives being frozen alive due to high amounts of urea and glucose in its blood. In Japan, a troop of Japanese macaques must take shelter in trees as night falls. Elsewhere, a pregnant wood mouse finds shelter near a hive of honey bees. Then, a wolverine digs for food under snow.
3	"Jungle Nights"	29 January 2020
A mother jaguar in the Pantanal waits for nightfall to feed. In a forest in Argentina, a young night monkey explores, using both sight and smell to find his way. Then, in Borneo, a herd of elephants travels through the forest and meets by roads where grass grows. At night, many frog species, like Túngara frogs, compete for mates while avoiding bats. Up in the trees, a kinkajou searches for food using its sense of smell, while tarsiers use their large eyes to find food. The aye-aye uses its hearing and long, third digit to feed on larvae. On the forest floor, a curlyhair tarantula lies in wait for prey. Back in the Pantanal, an ocelot goes on the hunt. Then, polka-dot tree frogs can see each other thanks to fluorescence, while pitcher plants also glow in the moonlight to attract insects. An atlas moth finds its way through scent to find mates, dying soon after mating and its nutrients being recycled by fungi. Finally, a young orangutan feeds at night to avoid larger males.
4	"Dark Seas"	29 January 2020
Baby green sea turtles hatch on islands by the Great Barrier Reef and must avoid silver gulls and blacktip reef sharks. Then, in Indonesia's Lembeh Strait, a tiger mantis shrimp uses its complex vision to hunt. Then in Palau, three days before the new moon, bumphead parrotfish begin to spawn. Their eggs join the plankton that drift in the open ocean, which triggers the largest migration on Earth. Feeding on the plankton are manta rays and whale sharks. As the moon influences the tides, rockpools are created, where a prawn struggles to survive. On an island in Mossel Bay, South Africa, a great white shark uses the light from the nearby town to hunt fur seals. Then, on a coral reef, corals use special pigments only visible under blue lights to protect them from the sun. Then, Japanese fishermen catch firefly squid that are spawning. Finally, dolphins swim through bioluminescent dinoflagellates.
5	"Sleepless Cities"	29 January 2020
A herd of African bush elephants travel through a town under the cover of darkness. Then in Portland, Oregon, migrating Vaux's swifts use an old chimney to sleep in while avoiding Cooper's hawks. Then, in Mumbai, India, Indian leopards hunt for feral animals. In Aspen, Colorado, American black bears head downtown to search for food before winter. On Halloween night in Anchorage, Alaska, moose do much the same by eating pumpkins. In Vienna, Austria, black-bellied hamsters have made their homes in cemeteries, but are trapped by walls and roads. In Melbourne, Australia, brushtail possums have learned to navigate. Animals have taken over some cities, like a troop of macaques in Lopburi, Thailand. Cities however have caused problems for some animals, like diamondback terrapins across the river from New York City struggle to find places to nest. In Singapore, smooth-coated otters have thrived thanks to people cleaning the city.
6	"Dusk Till Dawn"	29 January 2020
As darkness looms, flocks of American flamingos and troops of geladas take shelter, while Mexican free-tailed bats begin their day. During the night, many animals in Zimbabwe are still awake, including a herd of elephants protecting their young. In the United States, fireflies begin to glow in the dark to find mates. In the Norwegian fjords, herring are caught by fishermen and orcas. In Alaska, salmon continue through the night towards their spawning grounds, while brown bears try to catch them. As dawn approaches, a colugo communicates using ultrasound to warn others of a reticulated python. As dawn begins in Thailand, lar gibbons awaken and make their calls to strengthen bonds.
