= List of You're the Worst episodes =

You're the Worst is an American comedy-drama television series created by Stephen Falk that premiered on July 17, 2014, on FX. It is centered on Jimmy (Chris Geere), a self-involved writer, and Gretchen (Aya Cash), a self-destructive Los Angeles public relations executive, as they attempt a relationship. For the second and successive seasons, the series moved to FXX. In November 2017, FX renewed the series for a fifth and final season which premiered on January 9, 2019. During the course of the series, 62 episodes of You're the Worst aired, between July 17, 2014, and April 3, 2019.

== Series overview ==
Season	Episodes	Originally released		
Season	Episodes	First released	Last released	Network
1	10	July 17, 2014	September 18, 2014	FX
2	13	September 9, 2015	December 9, 2015	FXX
3	13	August 31, 2016	November 16, 2016	FXX
4	13	September 6, 2017	November 15, 2017	FXX
5	13	January 9, 2019	April 3, 2019	FXX

== Episodes ==
=== Season 1 (2014) ===
No. overall	No. in season	Title	Directed by	Written by	Original release date	Prod. code	U.S. viewers (millions)
1	1	"Pilot"	Jordan Vogt-Roberts	Stephen Falk	July 17, 2014	XYW01001	0.765
Jimmy is thrown out of Becca and Vernon's wedding reception. He meets Gretchen, who is running off with one of the bride's gifts. Discovering that they feel the same about long-term love, the two hook up that night, vowing that they will never become a conventional couple. Usually Jimmy's conquests are gone by morning, but Gretchen stays and meets Edgar, who is cooking breakfast for Jimmy. Late for work, she gets a ride from Lindsay who is astonished she had sex with Jimmy. Gretchen gets annoyed with Lindsay and asks to be let out of the car. At work she finds that rapper Sam Dresden and his pals have wrecked a photographer's studio during a photo shoot. Sam blames her for being late and insists she find him some drugs to make up for it. She returns to Jimmy's house to get her purse and has an argument with Jimmy, which ends with her telling Jimmy the night was a mistake and he was lucky to get her. Later Edgar tells Jimmy that Gretchen must be special because she spent the night. Jimmy finds that Gretchen has taken his car, and calls her. Gretchen is at Ty Wyland's house to get drugs for Sam. She has found that Ty is not as attractive as he used to be. She and Jimmy talk and realize they want to see more of each other.
2	2	"Insouciance"	Alex Hardcastle	Stephen Falk	July 24, 2014	XYW01002	0.610
After a faux pas involving Gretchen's period, Jimmy tries to make it up to her by taking her out to an expensive restaurant. The date starts awkwardly, then Becca and Vernon show up, causing Gretchen to flee before they see can her with Jimmy. They abandon the restaurant and take Chinese food to a showing of Ferris Bueller's Day Off. Jimmy attempts to bring more attention to his book at a local bookstore, irritating the manager (played by Stephanie Courtney), and accidentally abandoning his adolescent neighbor Killian there in the process. Edgar has to find Killian and return him home. Gretchen steals the bookstore's cat, "Kerouac".
3	3	"Keys Open Doors"	Alex Hardcastle	Stephen Falk	July 31, 2014	XYW01003	0.393
Gretchen hints that she might need a key to Jimmy's house. Jimmy misinterprets it as her wanting to take the next step in their relationship, but she insists that is not why she brought up the idea. Gretchen has to smooth over rapper Sam Dresden's latest PR blunder. Jimmy sees a text from Gretchen's other lover Ty while returning her phone to her. He follows her to a bar expecting to see her on a date, but instead finds her at her birthday party, to which he was not invited. Becca and Vernon are there, forcing Gretchen to reveal her relationship with Jimmy, to Becca's horror. Returning to Jimmy's house, the two find Sam in an unexpected situation.
4	4	"What Normal People Do"	Alex Hardcastle	Stephen Falk	August 7, 2014	XYW01004	0.565
A remark from Sam leads Gretchen to invite Jimmy to her apartment. To his horror, he finds that her apartment is a disgusting mess. Edgar struggles with people's apathy to his PTSD. An apparently sympathetic veteran turns out to be an actor looking for material. Lindsay has her jaw wired shut to lose the weight she gained after marrying Paul, but finds herself wondering whether she wants to change. Edgar and Lindsay meet when Lindsay arrives at Jimmy's, looking for Gretchen. Jimmy wants to go back to his own house but does not want to be seen as walking out; Gretchen would like him to leave but does not want him to think she is throwing him out. Then Gretchen is happy to be alone in her own space again, but eventually goes to Jimmy's house anyway. Edgar and Lindsay go to a diner where Edgar removes the wires and they share a meal. Later Edgar and Jimmy see a TV show where the actor appears as a disturbed veteran running amok. Edgar is not happy.
5	5	"Sunday Funday"	Jordan Vogt-Roberts	Stephen Falk	August 14, 2014	XYW01005	0.415
Jimmy joins Gretchen, Lindsay and Edgar on "Sunday Funday," a day of recreation and drinking. Jimmy discovers that Ty has invited Gretchen to the Tribeca Film Festival; Jimmy tries to get Gretchen to stop sitting on the fence in her likes and dislikes, though he is actually trying to get her to prefer him over Ty. Gretchen complains to Lindsay that she cannot look at Jimmy without seeing "years into the future", which scares her. Lindsay realizes she likes everything about her life except her husband and the prospect of children. Edgar finds that his Sunday Funday plans may have been co-opted by hipsters. He finds new confidence in the realization that somebody copied him to impress his friends.
6	6	"PTSD"	Jordan Vogt-Roberts	Franklin Hardy & Shane Kosakowski	August 21, 2014	XYW01006	0.555
Vernon and Becca enter counseling to rescue their relationship. The counselor recommends that they eliminate any "toxic elements" in their lives. They take Jimmy and Gretchen to breakfast, and tell them they are being eliminated from their lives. Jimmy and Gretchen run up a large bill on Vernon's credit card. Jimmy tells Gretchen he is interviewing the latest Hollywood "It" actress for a magazine article. Gretchen dares him to get nude pictures of her. Jimmy has sex with the actress, which causes a competition to arise between him and Gretchen as to who can have the most sex. Jimmy texts all his old girlfriends and gets hateful responses. He then makes a pass at Becca. Gretchen and Lindsay interview prospects in a bar. Lindsay cheats on Paul with a young man from Ohio; Edgar struggles with whether he should tell Gretchen about Jimmy's infidelity, unaware that she goaded him into it. He consults a priest at the local Veterans Administration office, and a local radio call-in show, but gets no help from either. Both Jimmy and Gretchen tire of the contest and realize they have been avoiding the issue of "going exclusive". They decide to be exclusive. Edgar decides all's well that ends well, and keeps the "secret" to himself. Stephen Falk provides the voice of the call-in show host.
7	7	"Equally Dead Inside"	Jordan Vogt-Roberts	Alison Bennett	August 28, 2014	XYW01007	0.533
At breakfast Edgar tries to celebrate Jimmy and Gretchen's "exclusive" status, but they will not cooperate. Jimmy receives a soccer jersey as a gift from his father. He throws it out and leaves in a funk. Edgar tells Gretchen that it is now her job to deal with Jimmy's issues instead of him. Jimmy finds his book has been remaindered by the bookstore and decides to heckle Sandra Bernhard (appearing as herself) when she gives a reading there. Gretchen tries and fails to listen to Jimmy's complaints about his father. She also cannot handle Lindsay's guilt about her infidelity. Jimmy goes to the bookstore event, but is so affected by the reading that he forgets about heckling. He is thrown out when he tries to get Bernhard to help him get his book back on sale. Edgar and Lindsay keep trying to set up a meal with Jimmy and Gretchen, but are stood up each time. They begin to wonder if they are merely "sidekicks". Gretchen and Dana, a friend from her job, visit Jimmy at home and decide to try a threesome. It is a spectacular failure and Dana walks out. Gretchen bemoans her inability to have women friends, but Jimmy asks her to stop. They each realize they cannot handle other people's pain, being "equally dead inside". This actually brings them closer together.
8	8	"Finish Your Milk"	Matt Shakman	Eva Anderson	September 4, 2014	XYW01008	0.472
When Gretchen's parents pay her a visit, she attempts to conceal them from Jimmy, first by pretending to leave town to see them, and then by persuading a random couple at an art exhibit to pose as them. She concocts an elaborate lie about them having to return home so her father can have a back operation. After she leaves Jimmy realizes, in a sequence parodying The Usual Suspects, that she used cues visible in the gallery to invent the lie. Lindsay, guilty over having cheated on Paul, spends a day with him. Edgar attempts to get medication from the VA office to help him sleep, but finds the caseworker is trying to avoid helping him. Following Gretchen to an expensive country club, Jimmy is shocked to learn that she had a strict upbringing and her parents still think she is a goody-two-shoes. Jimmy "outs" Gretchen to her parents, causing a fight with Gretchen at Jimmy's house. Sneaking into Jimmy's room, Gretchen accidentally finds the ring Jimmy originally bought for Becca. Thinking it is for her, she announces she is done with Jimmy and runs out.
9	9	"Constant Horror and Bone-Deep Dissatisfaction"	Matt Shakman	Stephen Falk	September 11, 2014	XYW01009	0.535
Beginning with Jimmy's disastrous proposal to Becca a few years earlier, we see the events leading up to the present day. Emerging from a pretentious radio show interview where he plugged his new book, Jimmy meets the homeless Edgar in an alley and offers him a "lounger on the deck" not realizing that Edgar will accept the offer. Gretchen is hanging out and doing drugs with Lindsay at a recording studio, sent as a "gofer" by the PR executive handling Sam Draper's rap trio. Sam, who is furious with the executive for not showing up, hires her to do his PR instead. She attends movie openings with the rappers and meets a well-known director, Ty, with whom she starts a relationship fueled by drugs and booze. This results in her DUI arrest the day before Becca's wedding, where she meets Jimmy. After they break up, Becca tries to proposition Jimmy to pay Vernon back for ignoring her, but Jimmy turns her down. Edgar walks out on Jimmy, saying that while he was with Gretchen he was actually a "fun person". Gretchen tries to go back to doing drugs at the studio with Lindsay, but realizes it is not what she wants anymore. She goes back to her apartment to set it, and her life, to rights. Jimmy is left alone in his house, trying to write a novel or a song, but unable to do either.
10	10	"Fists and Feet and Stuff"	Matt Shakman	Stephen Falk	September 18, 2014	XYW01010	0.552
Jimmy and Lindsay have each hit rock bottom in their own particular way. Gretchen is cleaning up her life and jogging. Edgar is sleeping in his car and has a menial job at a local gym. Becca and Vernon invite them all to a party, intending to announce Becca's pregnancy. Jimmy, Gretchen, Edgar and Lindsay attempt to resolve their issues with each other. Edgar, trying to show that he is "moving on", introduces Jimmy to his "new English friend", who turns out to be an actor. Gretchen and Lindsay decide that buying into marriage and relationships might be the "punk rock" choice for them. Gretchen finds Jimmy and says "yes" to his non-proposal. She runs off again when Jimmy tells her the ring was for Becca. Becca announces that she is pregnant, causing Lindsay to announce that she too will have a baby, but Paul then tells her he wants a divorce. Becca piles on, and Lindsay accuses her of cheating with Jimmy. The resulting argument ends with drunken Vernon attacking Jimmy, who is rescued by Edgar. Jimmy and Edgar patch things up and Edgar decides to move back in with Jimmy. After the party, Jimmy barges into Gretchen's apartment, determined to persuade her to move in with him. Gretchen responds "not yet", but then the mass of old Christmas lights decorating her couch sets the apartment on fire. Edgar is besotted with Lindsay after watching her sing karaoke at the party. Gretchen moves in with Jimmy, and both of them think things are working out for them, but dread the future. The bookstore cat, which Gretchen has been keeping, is returned to the store.

=== Season 2 (2015) ===
No. overall	No. in season	Title	Directed by	Written by	Original release date	Prod. code	U.S. viewers (millions)
11	1	"The Sweater People"	Alex Hardcastle	Stephen Falk	September 9, 2015	XYW02001	0.301
With Gretchen forced to live at Jimmy's house, the two try to avoid any hint of domesticity by partying heavily - with increasingly bizarre results. Lindsay is alone in the former marital home after Paul moves out. Paul stops by to pick up some things and talks about going to see the woman he met online. Lindsay wants to reconcile, convinced that girls like her should leave guys like Paul, and not the other way around. She seduces Paul and the two have sex, after which Paul leaves in horror over "betraying" his new love. Exhausted, Jimmy and Gretchen agree to try a normal night for a change, but their brief conversation scares them again and they head for a bar instead. Gretchen becomes unreliable in her work, and Sam is furious over her not answering his calls. Edgar brings one of his culinary creations to Lindsay, finding her wearing her wedding dress and crying in the garage. He suggests they "clean out Paul", so they trash all of Paul's toy and hobby items; Lindsay secretly freezes the condom Paul ejaculated in earlier.
12	2	"Crevasses"	Alex Hardcastle	Stephen Falk	September 16, 2015	XYW02002	0.267
Lindsay realizes she can use Edgar's attraction to her for her own selfish ends. She brings him to a sports bar in a mall so that he can be her wingman. A gay man at the bar convinces Edgar that Lindsay is using him, and tells Edgar to strike up a conversation with the bartender to make Lindsay jealous. Jimmy and Gretchen tag along on the mall trip, with Jimmy insisting that Gretchen buy her own "stuff" for the house while he looks for inspiration to write his next novel. During the process of shopping, Gretchen realizes that Jimmy is treating her more like a guest than a permanent resident of the house. Jimmy has reached the same conclusion, and apologizes by trying to build a small dresser with two drawers. Gretchen takes one of Jimmy's drawers instead, and also stakes her claim to part of the closet. Meanwhile, Edgar thinks Lindsay is finally seeing him differently when she shows up at the door, but she only asks him to take provocative photos of her that she can post online.
13	3	"Born Dead"	Alex Hardcastle	Stephen Falk	September 23, 2015	XYW02003	0.233
Gretchen misses her old "posse" and decides to have a get-together with them at Jimmy's house. It becomes a full-blown party, to Jimmy's dismay. Edgar approaches Paul for permission to woo Lindsay. At the party, Gretchen finds that one of her friends has brought her baby, another is pregnant and a third is in rehab. Young Killian tends bar at the party, avoiding his parents' troubles at home. Paul appears with Amy, his new girlfriend. Lindsay uses Edgar to make him jealous. Vernon arrives and tries to bond with Jimmy, who has taken refuge in the basement. Paul gets drunk and throws up, recording all the details in his personal phone log. Cory, the one remaining member of Gretchen's posse who still parties, shows up late, homeless and strung out. She offends all her former gal pals and leaves with Jimmy's stereo.
14	4	"All About That Paper"	Alex Hardcastle	Franklin Hardy & Shane Kosakowski	September 30, 2015	XYW02004	0.294
Jimmy and Gretchen depart home for separate work projects, vowing not to "check in" with each other during the day, but they still do. Gretchen resolves a feud between Sam and his rap trio mates, but then gets them to fake the feud for publicity. Jimmy meets with a writer (Roger Bart) who claims to like his book. After reading an excerpt from the man's current book, which Jimmy finds to be awful, he realizes the writer only wants him to help rescue the work. Elsewhere, Lindsay is convinced she saw jealousy in Paul's face when he witnessed her kissing Edgar. While visiting with Becca and Vernon, however, Lindsay is served with divorce papers. She angrily confronts Paul, who denies being jealous and insists he is better off with Amy. Meanwhile, Edgar is inspired by an improv duo at one of his PTSD support group meetings to trust his instincts. Alone at home, Lindsay takes Paul's used condom out of the freezer. As she warms up its contents for use, however, Edgar arrives and interrupts her. At Jimmy's house, he and Gretchen reflect on their satisfying days. After Jimmy falls asleep, Gretchen quietly leaves the house and takes off in her car.
15	5	"We Can Do Better Than This"	Wendey Stanzler	Eva Anderson	October 7, 2015	XYW02005	0.198
Jimmy gets a commission to write an original novel of NCIS: Los Angeles. Gretchen discovers he has a secret stash of erotic stories that he wrote at age 11. Lindsay and Gretchen realize they talk about nothing but men, and decide to do something about it. Lindsay then becomes obsessed with Internet conspiracy theories. Edgar loses interest in Lindsay as he gets close to Dorothy, the leader of his improv therapy group. The novel begins to get too complicated for Jimmy. He decides to join Edgar at the improv troupe's show and heckle, but is both impressed and intimidated by them instead. He comes home convinced he is just a hack. Gretchen starts reading Jimmy's juvenile erotica and decides she likes it, especially if Jimmy reads it to her. Jimmy decides to give the world the ultimate erotic novel. Once more Gretchen sneaks out late at night. This time Jimmy notices her departure.
16	6	"Side Bitch"	Wendey Stanzler	Alison Bennett	October 14, 2015	XYW02006	0.132
Jimmy finds Gretchen's other cell phone and uses it to set up a meeting with the person he thinks she is having an affair with. Lindsay cannot function at home, particularly when the power is cut for non-payment. She calls Paul, who asks what she has been doing with the checks he sends. Paul starts to offer more help, but he is stopped by Amy, and he instead tells Lindsay she must learn to deal with it. Edgar asks Jimmy for tips on asking Dorothy on a date. When he does ask her, she tells him about the hazing she has to deal with from the men in the improv troupe. Edgar tells her to take a stand. The troupe breaks up as a result. Gretchen takes Sam and his wing men to relationship therapy to fix their "fake feud" that has become real, but the therapy is no help. Jimmy takes Lindsay to lunch, hoping to find out more about Gretchen's activities. Lindsay tries to walk home alone and gets hopelessly lost. She takes refuge in Vernon's basement man-cave, raiding his stash of "medications". Jimmy takes Gretchen to the "date" he set up, at a pretentious "artisanal water" bar. Gretchen meets Ty there, finding him repulsive as usual. Jimmy discovers the "date" is with Sam, who gave Gretchen the phone in the first episode to keep her on a leash. Lindsay thinks Paul has come to comfort her in the man cave, but she is hallucinating and it is actually Vernon, who fondles her boob before deciding to decline her advances. Following Gretchen that night, Jimmy finds her alone in her car, crying.
17	7	"There Is Not Currently a Problem"	Wendey Stanzler	Stephen Falk & Philippe Iujvidin	October 21, 2015	XYW02007	0.182
Jimmy and Gretchen find Dorothy at breakfast with the weekend Bloody Mary ration already drunk and no food available. Traffic is snarled by a marathon run so they cannot go to the diner or the store. Gretchen starts drinking and dancing to conceal her blues. Jimmy starts hunting a mouse that is in the house. Lindsay arrives to complain about Becca's attitude to her, and Vernon "honking her boob" in the previous episode. Vernon arrives, looking for Lindsay to get her to keep quiet about the honking. Stuck in Jimmy's house, the different characters dance and bounce off each other. Jimmy obsesses over catching the mouse while Gretchen keeps drinking. She finally loses it and puts everybody down one by one, except Vernon who is "not worth it". The mouse appears at her feet and she drops a copy of Jimmy's novel on it. Jimmy and the gang decide to euthanize the mouse on his car exhaust while Gretchen recovers with Lindsay's help. Gretchen admits to Jimmy that she has been handling depression for years, but he cannot fix her. As they embrace, Jimmy spots another mouse.
18	8	"Spooky Sunday Funday"	Wendey Stanzler	Stephen Falk	October 28, 2015	XYW02008	0.240
Jimmy plans a Halloween Sunday Funday to get Gretchen out of her funk, but has Edgar pretend it was his idea. Edgar tells Jimmy he is still too nervous with Dorothy, and says he has not had sex in three years. They all wear costumes, but Jimmy's is from a British period drama nobody else has heard of. Jimmy's plan leads them to an extreme House of Horrors where they have to sign a release to enter. Lindsay breaks down in a torture session and gets some life coaching from her "torturer". Edgar freaks out and beats up a "mad slasher", then opens up to Dorothy. They have sex in the dungeon. At the end, Jimmy reveals his plan to Gretchen, making her angry. He leaves and meets the owner of his bar, Nina, who connects with him over his obscure outfit. Gretchen decides to pretend he really did fix her, to stop him trying again. Lindsay, having been coached into calling the power company, returns home to find all the lights on, with TV and appliances running. The episode features pastiches of horror movies ranging from chainsaw massacres to "found video footage".
19	9	"LCD Soundsystem"	Stephen Falk	Stephen Falk	November 4, 2015	XYW02009	0.234
Lexi and Rob are a married couple with a daughter, a house, a nanny and a dog. Their lives superficially resemble Jimmy and Gretchen. Gretchen is stalking them, having noticed them in the local coffee bar. Jimmy leaves her to her own devices for the day, so he can do his quota of writing, though he starts out drinking and playing darts with Edgar. Gretchen spies on Lexi and Rob in their home, persuades the nanny to let her hold their daughter in a local drugstore, and then "borrows" their dog for a day, taking it around the neighborhood talking about their life as if it were hers. While doing this, she appears genuinely happy. She returns the dog in person, saying she found it, and is invited in for a drink. Jimmy joins them and they all seem to get along, but then Rob confides to Gretchen that he misses the old, wild ways, and thinks about getting divorced. Gretchen's euphoric mood is destroyed, and she announces they have to leave. While Jimmy ridicules the older couple on the way home, Gretchen begins to cry.
20	10	"A Right Proper Story"	Stephen Falk	Franklin Hardy & Shane Kosakowski	November 11, 2015	XYW02010	0.185
Jimmy is horrified when his father and three sisters come to visit for four days. They settle in to drink, smoke, and watch the "Eurotunes Contest" on the "telly". Gretchen sinks into depression and asks Lindsay to help rapper Sam with his latest crisis. Sam's feud with Honeynutz and Shitstain has made him doubt his brand image and he has become creatively blocked. He hears Lindsay sing to herself as she works on his wardrobe, and is inspired to record a new track with her. Two of Jimmy's sisters wreak havoc at the local supermarket while Edgar takes a shine to Lilly, the youngest and nicest. Dad buys a black-market gun, but no bullets. Jimmy angrily tells them all to leave, but they just laugh. Jimmy and Dad have a drink together at the bar. Dad tells Jimmy he has read Jimmy's book and is proud of him. Jimmy reaches out to Lilly, who might have gone to college but became a stripper instead. After they are finally gone, Jimmy leaves Gretchen to her misery and goes to the bar, where he opens up to Nina.
21	11	"A Rapidly Mutating Virus"	Matt Shakman	Eva Anderson & Alison Bennett	November 18, 2015	XYW02011	0.188
Gretchen moves in with Lindsay. She is taking Adderall and later cocaine to get through the day. Lindsay brags to Becca about singing on Sam's new rap track. Vernon is involved with an Internet "financial dominatrix" who now controls his money, so he is broke and tries to keep it from Becca. He appeals to Paul for help. Sam pushes his new track on the DJ Trace radio show, but walks out when callers declare it "whack". Becca, turned on by the fact that Lindsay's song with Sam has flopped, now wants to have sex with Vernon. Jimmy invites Nina to his house to watch the Christmas special of the obscure British TV drama they both like. The moment turns romantic, but Jimmy tells Nina about Gretchen, and Nina walks out. Edgar goes to a barbecue with Dorothy and her former improv troupe and tries to be like the guys, which offends Dorothy. Sam goes back to the DJ Trace show to apologize, but Trace has also invited Shitstain and Honeynutz. Sam challenges a woman caller. As they are leaving, she and two other large women drive up and beat up the three rappers. Lindsay is thrown into a pile of garbage. Gretchen ends the fight by pulling out the gun Jimmy's father bought. The incident causes Sam, Shitstain and Honeynutz to reconcile. Back at Lindsay's, Gretchen says that she feels nothing anymore. Jimmy, having been told to get lost by Gretchen, goes to Nina's bar and finally kisses her, re-enacting the final scene from the TV show.
22	12	"Other Things You Could Be Doing"	Matt Shakman	Stephen Falk	December 2, 2015	XYW02012	0.175
Jimmy's bar room make out session with Nina ends abruptly when he is disgusted by the condition of her feet. She tells him she has had too many drunken quickies, but invites him to her mountain lodge for the weekend. Edgar is with Dorothy getting ready for his improv group graduation show. Re-evaluating her life after the "scare" in the previous episode, Lindsay is apologizing to everybody she has ever hurt, including Becca. Jimmy returns home to pack and finds Gretchen semi-comatose. She will not talk, but texts him instead. She left Lindsay to get away from the apologizing. Jimmy takes her phone and sends a text to everybody in her contacts list. As a result, Gretchen gets a talk from several other characters, including vagrant Cory, "Rob" the neighbor, Vernon, Becca, Killian, and Sam Dresden and his wingmen. Mostly they just talk about themselves. Lindsay reads from her list of apologies. Edgar's show is a triumph, but he is depressed to find that Jimmy was not in the audience. Lindsay follows Amy and Paul to the park, gives the signed divorce papers to Amy, and then throws up. Edgar helps Dorothy look at a new apartment, which she loves but cannot afford. Edgar suggests living together to split the cost. As Jimmy prepares to leave, Gretchen rouses herself to wish him good luck with "whoever she is" and tells him she will be gone when he gets back. Jimmy has a change of heart while waiting for Nina to pick him up, and hides when she arrives. Nina finds him hiding and leaves in disgust. He goes back into the house and builds a blanket tent around the sleeping Gretchen, lying down next to her. Lindsay gives herself a drugstore pregnancy test in a parking lot, and disappointed to realize she is pregnant.
23	13	"The Heart Is a Dumb Dumb"	Matt Shakman	Stephen Falk	December 9, 2015	XYW02013	0.269
Becca and Vernon throw another party, this time to announce the sex of their child. Jimmy is upset that Gretchen won't take medication, and arrives determined to get as drunk as possible. Gretchen sets out to see what is so special about Nina. Edgar arrives at the party with Dorothy, intending to tell Jimmy he is moving out. Becca "accidentally" tells Paul that Lindsay is pregnant, causing him to have a crisis and setting off an attack of IBS. Vernon breaks into the bathroom to beg Paul for more money. Jimmy gets to his "angry drunk" stage and tells Edgar that Dorothy is manipulating him. Gretchen meets Nina at the bar and they bond over Jimmy's childish behavior. Gretchen tries to kiss Nina and is told to leave the bar. Edgar retracts his offer to move in with Dorothy, and she leaves in a huff. Paul believes he is the father of Lindsay's baby, and breaks up with Amy. Amy hits him, breaking his glasses. Jimmy reaches the "I love everyone" stage of drunkenness, and launches into a long speech to everyone at the party. Paul tries to reconnect with Lindsay, but she rebuffs him. Jimmy reaches the maudlin stage. He sees Edgar and tells him to pursue Dorothy. Vernon then confesses to everybody, about his fear of being a father, his emotional issues, his job, and his money problems. Horrified, Becca drags him inside the house. Gretchen arrives and takes Jimmy home. Paul sings a karaoke version of "Don't Know Much" after the guests have left, and Lindsay joins him in a love duet. Edgar finds Dorothy at the bus stop. She tells him it was just an ordinary fight and she is not breaking up with him. Paul and Lindsay leave in Paul's new motor scooter and sidecar rig, with Lindsay now looking horrified. Vernon and Becca are left in the ruins of their party. When Jimmy sobers up, Gretchen offers to get treatment, and tells him he said "something dark" when he was drunk. She then says, "I love you too".

=== Season 3 (2016) ===
No. overall	No. in season	Title	Directed by	Written by	Original release date	Prod. code	U.S. viewers (millions)
24	1	"Try Real Hard"	Wendey Stanzler	Stephen Falk	August 31, 2016	XYW03001	0.347
Jimmy and Gretchen reach new heights in the bedroom but Jimmy refuses to acknowledge saying "I love you", or meaning it if he did. Edgar is having sexual performance issues due to his new medication. Jimmy suggests role playing. Paul shows Lindsay that he is giving up all his hobbies and throwing out his stuff, vowing to only pursue things they can do together. Sam and his wingmen want a surprise reunion show with "under the radar" publicity. Jimmy begins to find out things he never knew about Gretchen; she went to Bible camp and she speaks fluent Spanish. Edgar opens up to Dorothy and they agree to work it out; Edgar decides to ditch his medication. Sam's show is a disaster as nobody shows up; Gretchen didn't understand the concept of under the radar publicity, so there was no publicity at all. To save face, Gretchen addresses the congregation of a storefront Hispanic church, in Spanish, and gets them to attend. She tells Jimmy it doesn't matter about saying "I love you" because she always has one foot out the door anyway. He says "I love you". Paul is creating a "domestic paradise" for Lindsay with pre-planned, pre-portioned gourmet meals. After cutting up some vegetables, she stabs him with her kitchen knife.
25	2	"Fix Me, Dummy"	Wendey Stanzler	Stephen Falk	September 7, 2016	XYW03002	0.269
Jimmy announces he's completed and submitted his erotic novel proposal, while Dorothy prepares to move out of the house. Edgar notes that Gretchen hasn't done her one assigned chore – opening the mail. Gretchen says she hates opening mail because it's frequently a bill or bad news. Gretchen sees Justina, a therapist, and gets mad when Justina says Gretchen needs to do some of the work in order to recover. Gretchen thinks Justina is suggesting she can fix herself. Lindsay tends to Paul's knife wound, claiming he "backed into" the knife, while stealing his pain meds for herself. She then leaves Paul to fend for himself and joins her friends for breakfast. Her friends are shocked when Lindsay admits she "kind of pushed" the knife. Edgar is helping Dorothy move into her apartment and notices there are many homeless veterans in that area of town. He begins helping the vets and ignoring Dorothy. Jimmy, tagging along but also not helping, takes plot and style suggestions from the locals, and a cop. After a parking lot confrontation, Justina convinces Gretchen to open some mail, and Gretchen later does so. Near the bottom of the pile, she finds a letter from Jimmy's sister in England, telling him their father has died. The letter includes a newspaper obituary, and has likely been sitting in the mail pile for a couple of weeks. Jimmy then bursts into the room with a rage of excitement, as he just found out his book proposal was accepted. Gretchen tries to hide the letter, and asks Jimmy if he's talked to anyone from his family recently.
26	3	"Bad News: Dude's Dead"	Wendey Stanzler	Eva Anderson	September 14, 2016	XYW03003	0.350
Gretchen encounters Justina at a café, and tries to blame the situation with Jimmy's father on her while simultaneously seeking advice. She then tries to convince Edgar to break the news to Jimmy, but Edgar is having his own issues handling things since going off his medication. Gretchen then organizes a party at the house, inviting Lindsay, Paul, Becca, Vernon, Edgar and Killian under the guise of it being a congratulatory event for Jimmy's book deal. But she then tries to convince all the friends to help her announce to Jimmy that his father is dead, soon giving up after Jimmy announces that he has bought cruise tickets for himself and Gretchen. During the party, Lindsay continually tries to convince herself that she loves Paul, and she's at least impressed when Paul loudly sticks up for her after she is insulted. Killian tells whoever will listen that his father left home several days ago with no explanation, and hasn't returned. As the party gets wilder, Jimmy retreats to the basement, and Edgar sees that he is going to call his father and gloat about selling the book (something he had alluded to multiple times since the publishing news). Jimmy has to leave a message, and after brief deliberation instead happily says "I sold a book, daddy!". Gretchen then comes down the basement and finally breaks the news, leaving Jimmy looking stunned.
27	4	"Men Get Strong"	Stephen Falk	Alison Bennett	September 21, 2016	XYW03004	0.207
Gretchen is worried when Jimmy still shows no sadness after finding out about his father. She tries to speed along his grieving, hoping to get it over with before they take their planned cruise together. She gets Jimmy to try different techniques to dredge up any feelings for his father, but nothing seems to work. Meanwhile, Lindsay realizes she doesn't want her child to hate her like Jimmy hates his father. She and Paul join Becca and Vernon at a parenting class, where Lindsay discovers she actually has good motherly instincts. Later, an expectant father is opening up to Lindsay about his own experience with second chances. Lindsay misinterprets the "second chances" comment and tries to kiss the guy, but he does not respond kindly. Back in his bedroom, Jimmy lays out a bunch of his father's things on his bed. Gretchen catches him still smiling, and Jimmy explains he finally knows what he feels...it's freedom.
28	5	"Twenty-Two"	Stephen Falk	Stephen Falk	September 28, 2016	XYW03005	0.196
This episode takes place on the same day as the previous one, but from Edgar's viewpoint. He has an appointment with the Chief of Medicine at the VA. He is dealing with insomnia, paranoia and anxiety from his PTSD, as well as putting up with Jimmy and Gretchen's obnoxious behavior, such as Jimmy's demands for British snacks, and the two of them having sex in the back seat of his car while Edgar is driving. Later Dorothy rejects his clumsy advances and tells him to stand up for himself. At the VA, Edgar is offered some specialized treatments, but only if he goes back on his medications first. He leaves his car on the highway and goes into a flood channel to drink the "car booze" he bought for Jimmy. He thinks of running out into traffic. He then sees a mysterious paper boat floating down the stream, but it turns out to be part of a film school silent movie project. The student director decides he likes Edgar's looks. When he gets back to his car later, it is about to be taken away on a flatbed truck, but the driver recognizes a veteran like himself. He shares a joint with Edgar and tells him to find something, anything, to help him deal with the PTSD himself. The driver has a companion dog, and knows of vets who do yoga or just rage out in private. Sitting in his car on the back of the truck, Edgar blisses out to his music. The episode ends with a silent monochrome film starring Edgar as a Chaplin/Keaton character. Seeing the paper boat, he urinates on it and leaves with a pretty girl.
29	6	"The Last Sunday Funday"	Wendey Stanzler	Stephen Falk	October 5, 2016	XYW03006	0.218
Sunday Funday has become commonplace and commercialized. Instead of random activities, the gang embark on a surreal scavenger hunt to find a hidden speakeasy bar. Despite his disdain for the game, Jimmy solves nearly all the esoteric clues. Gretchen and Lindsay start fighting because Lindsay has become boring. Edgar gets a marijuana vaper and finds that it neutralizes his PTSD trigger sounds. Paul is called in to help with his knowledge of old railroads. Edgar, high on vape, gets some "immersion therapy" with fireworks. The gang are directed to a house and invade it, thinking it is the speakeasy. They are arrested and find a secret door in their cell that leads them to their goal. The drinks are outrageously expensive. Lindsay tells Paul she wants to stay married and be a family with their coming child, then persuades Paul to let her sleep with other men to keep her happy. Jimmy sings a ragtime song. Edgar and Gretchen decide that Sunday Funday is over.
30	7	"The Only Thing That Helps"	Stephen Falk	Franklin Hardy & Shane Kosakowski	October 12, 2016	XYW03007	0.244
Jimmy is making slow progress on his book. Edgar tries to get a medical marijuana card at the VA, but is told it's still an illegal drug as far as the VA is concerned. Lindsay selects her first hookup guy, but Paul persuades her to have a couples massage instead. Gretchen meets a new client, who turns out to be Ben Folds. Jimmy gets a delivery that he throws out. It is his father's ashes. Gretchen finds a note in the container asking Jimmy to give "Ronnie" a proper funeral. Jimmy decides to have a party, use the eulogy to denounce his Dad, and then throw the ashes into the toilet. Ronnie's old mate Charlie (Andrew Connolly) shows up at Jimmy's door, so Jimmy has him do the eulogy. Jimmy's creativity explodes as he uses the ashes as a surrogate for talking to his Dad. Paul changes his mind and brings the hookup guy to see Lindsay. At the party, while Ben Folds plays piano, Charlie reads from something Ronnie wrote a year before, when he knew he was dying. Ronnie wanted his ashes scattered in Tony Shalhoub's front yard. Jimmy is furious, starts a speech, then realizing his Dad was actually dying when they last met, leaves the house with the ashes. Edgar gets a marijuana card from a mobile clinic. Ben admits to Gretchen that his move to LA has failed to get him any publicity. Jimmy has a drunken conversation with his Dad outside a Hollywood mansion (presumably Shalhoub's), then tearfully tries to kick the container over the gate. It breaks, showering him with ashes.
31	8	"Genetically Inferior Beta Males"	Stephen Falk	Philippe Iujvidin	October 19, 2016	XYW03008	0.198
In therapy with Justina, Gretchen decides to meddle in her friends' lives like her mother did with her. She cuts off Jimmy's internet to force him to write, tells Lindsay to force Paul to let her hook up with men alone, and "manages" Edgar's "Dr. Weed" internet videos. Jimmy gets out of the house and discovers having fun in the park. Paul reacts to Lindsay by deciding to embrace the "cuckold fetish". Edgar is recorded by a professional. Paul becomes a masochist, disgusting Lindsay even more. Edgar's recording is edited into propaganda for legalizing marijuana. Jimmy, interviewed on Vernon and Becca's podcast, realizes his whole life, including becoming a writer, was about annoying his Dad. Edgar says he hates Gretchen, Lindsay now wants an abortion, and Jimmy seems to abandon writing altogether. Gretchen tracks down Justina at a craft beer bar and starts unloading about her issues with her mother.
32	9	"The Seventh Layer"	Wendey Stanzler	Stephen Falk	October 26, 2016	XYW03009	0.176
Vernon and Paul are out in a rural community buying a bassinet for Vernon's coming child. After a stop for gasoline, Paul's car breaks down on a deserted road. With no cell service and no water in the car, Vernon goes into the woods to look for a stream and Paul follows. The two get hopelessly lost, and darkness eventually falls. After some male bonding, both men complain about their wives. Paul reveals to Vernon that Lindsay is having sex with other men right in front of him. Vernon suggests they take off for Mexico and leave the women behind, and Paul later agrees. When they find their way back to the car, Paul has a change of heart and says he can't leave his child. Based on the price differential between gasoline and diesel, Paul deduces from a receipt that Vernon pumped diesel fuel into the car's gas tank. Paul accuses Vernon of sabotage, and Vernon admits to the deed, saying he did not want to return home to Becca and his miserable life. Vernon makes plans to go to San Diego with a good Samaritan motorist, but when he realizes the bassinet is gone, he thinks about his child and decides to get in the car with Paul instead.
33	10	"Talking to Me, Talking to Me"	Wendey Stanzler	Alison Bennett	November 2, 2016	XYW03010	0.115
Jimmy thinks he is a new man, power-walking in the mornings and downing raw eggs. Gretchen is trying to practice "mindfulness" as part of her therapy, looking at her life from the outside. She invites Jimmy to do the same. Edgar is helping Dorothy audition for a commercial. Gretchen meets Lindsay for a "pre-abobo breakfast" while still trying to be "in the moment". Edgar meets Doug Benson at Dorothy's cattle-call and gets an offer from him to make a "Dr. Weed" short. Jimmy builds a tree-house platform and knocks down the ladder, stranding himself. He has stopped hearing his Dad's voice, but can't stop hearing his novel's characters' voices, so he writes with his carpenter's pencil. Lindsay leaves Gretchen in the car to go to the clinic, but has second thoughts after Paul sends romantic texts and voice messages. She is approached by an anti-abortion picketer who listens to her story. Gretchen quits meditating and tries some vibrator therapy instead. She then rushes to Lindsay's aid, but the picketer says that after hearing Lindsay's rants the abortion might be a good idea. Jimmy, still stranded, sees his life from a new viewpoint. Edgar tells Dorothy about receiving an offer to write for Benson. She conceals her dismay. Lindsay is totally "in the moment" at post-abortion drinks with Gretchen, not thinking of what she has done or what she will do next. Gretchen comes home, trying to be "in the moment". Jimmy enters and tells her he has looked at his life from the outside and doesn't know if he made the right decision about anything.
34	11	"The Inherent, Unsullied Qualitative Value of Anything"	Wendey Stanzler	Franklin Hardy & Shane Kosakowski	November 9, 2016	XYW03011	0.181
Jimmy lists the pros and cons of everything in his life to decide what to keep. Gretchen is one of the things. They go to a reception for Shitstain and Jaqueline, who eloped. Gretchen bugs Jimmy to let her see his list. Jimmy hides it in his jacket. Sam Dresden shows up in a wild outfit instead of the suit he was given to wear to give the toast to the couple. Shitstain fires him as his best man and recruits Honeynutz, who can't speak in public except in his rapper persona. Edgar arrives with Dorothy but becomes preoccupied with thinking of comedy ideas for Doug Benson. Gretchen tells Lindsay she will be broke after divorcing Paul, so Lindsay tries to find a job. She spots Priscilla, a fashion blogger turned stylist, and follows her around. Gretchen gets the list from Jimmy's jacket, but finds it is a decoy. She starts writing her own pros and cons about Jimmy. Edgar spots comedian Brian Posehn and starts pitching ideas at him. Dorothy sinks into self-pity over her lack of success. Sam reconciles with Shitstain and gives the toast with a panicky Honeynutz, who can only read lame jokes from a card. Lindsay crushes Paul, telling him she had an abortion and wants a divorce. Jimmy and Gretchen each read one con from their lists. Each is horrified at the other. They leave separately. The episode consists entirely of single unedited takes done with a steadicam following the characters from room to room, aside from the pre-opening credits scene.
35	12	"You Knew It Was a Snake"	Wendey Stanzler	Eva Anderson	November 16, 2016	XYW03012	0.200
Gretchen wakes up on the couch. Jimmy appears and announces that he has written 35 pages of his novel so Gretchen's concerns about his inability to succeed are rubbish. His worries about her having children are based on the fact that she has dropped every phone she has had. Lindsay is discovered sleeping naked under a blanket on another couch. Edgar and Dorothy start arguing about why he got the job with Doug Benson when she has failed in showbiz. Paul arrives and starts arguing with Lindsay. Jimmy sends them to his room so he can argue with Gretchen. Tensions mount with the three couples until they all get a text announcing the birth of Becca's daughter, Tallulah. Gradually things calm down, but little is resolved. Edgar gets a call to join Doug's writers' meeting, but decides to lie to Dorothy about it. Lindsay pleads with Paul to discard their prenuptial agreement, but Paul tells her she'd better "lawyer up". Jimmy reads his unfinished novel to Gretchen, who loves it, but both realize they haven't fixed their relationship. He collapses against her from lack of sleep. She picks up her phone to check something, but drops it.
36	13	"No Longer Just Us"	Wendey Stanzler	Stephen Falk and Franklin Hardy & Shane Kosakowski	November 16, 2016	XYW03013	0.137
With encouragement from Gretchen, Jimmy finishes his novel and proclaims himself finally free of his family. He shows Gretchen information about a murder in the area, and, excited, she wants to go to the scene. The group visits Becca and Vernon to see baby Tallulah. Paul tells Vernon he's ready to follow through on the plan to flee to Mexico, but Vernon has become a doting dad and isn't going anywhere. Paul and Lindsay meet with a lawyer to discuss terms of the divorce. Paul offers to give Lindsay $2,000 a month, which the clueless Lindsay quickly accepts, thinking she can easily live on that amount. A vindictive Paul says he will enjoy seeing her struggle. Edgar goes to see Doug Benson, planning to quit for the sake of his relationship with Dorothy; but he has a change of heart and decides he doesn't want to blow this career opportunity. He goes to Dorothy's apartment and sees she has packed up to move home to Jacksonville, having given up on show business. Lindsay asks Becca if she can move in with her and Vernon, to which Becca tells her that she should revel in her newfound freedom. Gretchen and Jimmy meet with her therapist Justina, who reveals she is moving to Iowa with her boyfriend. She has also been sharing Gretchen's rants with her hipster friends, who ask to hear them from Gretchen herself. Justina tells Gretchen that she has actually faced her problems and made progress. Edgar offers Dorothy's apartment to Lindsay, who sees a cockroach there but still smiles. Jimmy makes an unconventional marriage proposal to Gretchen at the scene of the "murder", which was a ruse Jimmy set up. She finds it all romantic and accepts, saying that, despite their own past struggles, they can be a real family. The mention of the word "family" sends Jimmy into despair, as he gets into his car and drives away, leaving Gretchen stranded.

=== Season 4 (2017) ===
No. overall	No. in season	Title	Directed by	Written by	Original release date	Prod. code	U.S. viewers (millions)
37	1	"It's Been, Part 1"	Stephen Falk	Stephen Falk	September 6, 2017	XYW04001	0.298
Now living in a retirement motor home park in the California desert near Barstow, Jimmy does handyman work for neighbors while befriending Burt, an elderly man who is very attached to an old muscle car, a red Buick Wildcat convertible from the 1960s. Unfortunately Burt's increasingly erratic driving makes him a danger to all around him. Burt is also a curmudgeon who refuses the companionship of the other retirees. Jimmy has not turned on his cell phone in three months. After helping Burt make some difficult life choices, Jimmy receives a galley copy of his new book Width of a Peach in the mail, and finally decides to turn his phone back on. He sells his BMW, leaving the money for Burt, and later drives Burt's car toward Los Angeles. Burt reluctantly begins to hang out with the rest of the residents.
38	2	"It's Been, Part 2"	Stephen Falk	Stephen Falk	September 6, 2017	XYW04002	0.246
Lindsay enjoys a day at her new job as a stylist's assistant, returning that evening to her apartment and Gretchen, who has been living there since Jimmy left her on the hill three months ago. Gretchen has not left the apartment, and tries to keep up a ruse with Sam and the rap trio that she's in Europe exploring new markets for their music. After a night of hard partying with Gretchen, a disheveled Lindsay learns that her boss, Priscilla, wants to give her a promotion. Lindsay later visits Edgar, who is living in Jimmy's old home and doing well writing sketches for Doug Benson. The two joke about being the responsible ones now, and begin imitating Jimmy and Gretchen, which leads to sex. Gretchen finally ventures outside. After Lindsay throws her out of her office, Gretchen goes to a bar and later hooks up with her old boyfriend Ty. Just after the two start sexual intercourse, Gretchen sees her phone light up, and a text from Jimmy saying, "Hey..."
39	3	"Odysseus"	Stephen Falk	Alison Bennett	September 13, 2017	XYW04003	0.224
Jimmy arrives back in his house to find Edgar and Lindsay having sex. Edgar is upset as Jimmy acts like everything is back to normal, while Lindsay says Gretchen has been thriving in Jimmy's absence. After Jimmy meets with Sam and his group and hears the "Europe" story, he is suspicious. Lindsay then tells the truth that Gretchen has been devastated, making Jimmy smile a little. Edgar is furious because he didn't know if Jimmy was even alive. Gretchen wakes up with Ty, later attending his boring party. After meeting Ty's friend Boone (Colin Ferguson) and drinking a lot of wine, the two later hook up in the back of Boone's car. Jimmy tries to send another text to Gretchen, but can't seem to word it right. Gretchen goes to Jimmy's home to confront him, yells "Hey! Dot-dot-dot!", and leaves. Jimmy follows her to Lindsay's apartment with Edgar in tow. Jimmy and Gretchen argue a bit, which ends with Jimmy saying how the word "family" affected him. Gretchen appears to understand and acts apologetic, but moments later, it becomes clear that she isn't sorry.
40	4	"This Is Just Marketing"	Tamra Davis	Franklin Hardy & Shane Kosakowski	September 20, 2017	XYW04004	0.261
Jimmy gets annoyed when his publishing rep, Candace (Merrin Dungey), wants to market Width of a Peach as erotica rather than literature, but he later embraces the decision during a live reading for fans of the genre. Gretchen joins Becca on Vernon's podcast. As the two women trade insults about Jimmy, Gretchen begins to realize she pays rent for the Silver Lake house and has just as much right to live there as Jimmy does. Edgar pretends he wants more from his relationship with Lindsay than just sex, and she appears to buy into it before he reveals he was only teasing. Lindsay becomes angry when a drunk Becca appears to be neglecting baby Tallulah. Lindsay later tells her boss that she wants to throw herself fully into her career. As Jimmy views videos from his book read, Gretchen walks in with some of her stuff and heads to their once-shared bedroom. When he asks her what's going on, she says, "I live here," and tells him, "get out of my room."
41	5	"Fog of War, Bro"	Stephen Falk	Eva Anderson	September 27, 2017	XYW04005	0.221
As Gretchen is being a nuisance and destroying areas of the house, Jimmy prepares for an on-camera interview for the online version of People magazine. To keep Gretchen from disrupting the interview, he shows her a text he's prepared to send to Sam Dresden which will blow her cover of being in Europe. The two agree that each other's careers are off limits, but Jimmy unknowingly hits the send button for the text. Sam receives it, and he and Shitstain angrily confront Gretchen. When she tells the two what Jimmy did on the hill, they take her side and chastise Jimmy in front of the People interviewer. Gretchen plays nice at first, but later blows up the interview by telling the full story while the cameras roll. Gretchen then invites Boone to the house and proceeds to have sex within easy earshot of Jimmy.
42	6	"There's Always a Back Door"	Tamra Davis	Philippe Iujvidin	October 4, 2017	XYW04006	0.256
After sex with Boone at his house, Gretchen sees a text on Boone's phone from "Olivia" and assumes it's his wife. After contemplating that what she feels might be guilt over sleeping with a married man, Gretchen learns that Olivia is Boone's daughter and that he's divorced. Feeling that his best friend relationship with Jimmy isn't progressing the way it should, Edgar tries his best to bond with him. At dinner, Jimmy and Edgar run into Vernon and Paul (who is now a creepy men's rights activist) and Jimmy bluntly tells a horrified Edgar that he will never be close friends with him, leading Edgar to angrily leave the restaurant. Jimmy is convinced after opening up to Vernon and Paul that Gretchen having loud sex with Boone in the house was for him, and takes it as a sign that she still cares enough to be angry. After receiving a text from Lindsay stating that Gretchen is going to Boone's house to break up, Jimmy prepares a candlelight homecoming. But Gretchen and Boone work out their issues, leaving Jimmy alone and dejected. Meanwhile, Lindsay says she has no friends at work and deduces that she needs to act more like herself, which backfires when her coworkers ditch her to do karaoke, but she and Edgar bond over their genuine like of each other even as the world doesn't much like either of them. Jimmy, having previously decided not to appear at a big book promotion, calls his publisher to say he will attend.
43	7	"Not a Great Bet"	Tamra Davis	Stephen Falk	October 11, 2017	XYW04007	0.206
The episode follows Gretchen as she goes to her parents' home for the birth of her brother's first child. She discovers that her 8th grade friend Heidi (Zosia Mamet) survived leukemia and now owns their old roller rink hangout. Avoiding her familial duties, she reconnects with Heidi. Heidi does not share her enthusiasm, but they both go to an old abandoned mall to drink and smoke. They find some stressed out teenagers just hanging out and try to get them to loosen up. The police raid the mall and they escape in Gretchen's rented pickup, abandoning it in a corn field. As they walk home, Gretchen says she wants to stay in town with Heidi, but Heidi says they were never really friends after middle school because Gretchen was so reckless. Gretchen yells abuse at Heidi as she walks away. Gretchen finally arrives at the hospital, peeks in at her family with the new baby, and leaves.
44	8	"A Bunch of Hornballs"	Heath Cullens	Alison Bennett	October 18, 2017	XYW04008	0.311
Lindsay gets her final divorce papers in the mail, and Gretchen suggests a divorce party. Gretchen then asks Edgar to be the party planner, and Edgar accepts, though he is encouraged/swindled by workmate Max (Johnny Pemberton) into throwing a lavish, expensive affair. Lindsay is disappointed when her work friends refuse to show for the party, but a surprise guest—Paul—does show up after seeing photos of the party that Vernon posted. Paul taunts Lindsay, saying she is on her own and can no longer blame him for the bad things in her life. After a conversation with Gretchen about childhood, Lindsay deduces that Becca is the cause of all her problems. Gretchen, angered that Boone won't let her meet Olivia, tricks him into bringing his daughter to the party. Boone tells her he simply didn't want to get Olivia's hopes up regarding a new woman in his life, and the two decide they want to be an official couple and see where it goes. Elsewhere, Jimmy attends an erotica expo to push his book. He later goes to an after-party and hooks up with Adrienne (Amy Pietz), a fellow author, though their coitus is interrupted when she has to throw up. Jimmy gets a surprise call from Gretchen who, despite just committing to Boone, asks how he is doing at the expo and then wants to dish about Lindsay's party.
45	9	"Worldstar!"	Heath Cullens	Franklin Hardy & Shane Kosakowski	October 25, 2017	XYW04009	0.139
Gretchen wakes up next to her phone and realizes she and Jimmy fell asleep together while talking the previous night. Lindsay sets out to punch Becca as punishment for "ruining her life", with Gretchen ready to capture the moment on video. However Lindsay's mother Faye (Robin Riker) answers the door. Faye is a B-list actress whom Vernon says appeared nude in some late-night cable movies back in the 1980s. Becca starts belittling Lindsay about being married to a doctor while Lindsay is divorced, having a child while Lindsay aborted hers, etc. After Becca's superiority rant, she and the group walk in on Vernon masturbating to one of Faye's old movies. Becca breaks down, calling her husband a "penis in a clown wig" and admitting they are broke. Jimmy arrives home full of himself and optimistic about Gretchen after the late-night talk, but Edgar tells him about Boone showing up at the divorce party. Back at Lindsay's apartment, Edgar and Max order food while working on a script. It is delivered by one of Edgar's old Army comrades. When Edgar says he doesn't like to talk about his days in Iraq, the guy criticizes him and Edgar gets revenge by humiliating the guy for a $50 tip. Becca, Lindsay, and Gretchen watch some old family videos that indicate Faye neglected her daughters when they were very young. Jimmy tries to move on from Gretchen by hooking up with Katherine (Lucy Montgomery), an old acquaintance from England, but is surprised to find that his formerly plain classmate has become a beautiful and successful attorney. Katherine looks down on Jimmy and reminds him that he was an outcast in school whom everyone called "Shitty Jimmy". Gretchen arrives back at the house and sees Jimmy and Katherine having hateful sex.
46	10	"Dad-Not-Dad"	Heath Cullens	Eva Anderson	November 1, 2017	XYW04010	0.204
Lindsay and Becca go on a search for their former father figure, Lou Diamond Phillips, who used to be their mom's paramour but now spends his days ineffectually managing a lemon orchard. He tells them that Faye kicked him out of her life and made him promise to never come around her kids, but by episode's end he and Faye are hooking up again and he gives Lindsay and Becca decent advice. Gretchen tries to win over Boone's ex-wife Whitney (Anne Dudek) so she can spend time around Boone's daughter Olivia. Whitney breaks down over her life no longer being "fun" and gets drunk with Gretchen, who blacks out. She comes to in the middle of sex with Whitney at Lindsay's apartment. Jimmy tries to fit in among his old classmate Katherine's smart, talented and successful new friends, but only reveals himself to be a "rube" who is cast aside by them. This adds to Jimmy's generally bad and shunned day, as his good advice for Edgar to avoid buying a car he can't afford (under the malign influence of Max) is angrily brushed aside by Edgar. Gretchen tells Boone she doesn't need to have any contact with Jimmy anymore, but soon sends a text to Jimmy saying "we need to talk."
47	11	"From the Beginning, I Was Screwed"	Steph Green	Franklin Hardy & Shane Kosakowski	November 8, 2017	XYW04011	0.205
Jimmy's book is charting on the mass-market best-seller list. He tells his publisher to book him on the "NPR Quiz 'Tip of My Tongue'" to further promote it, where he is humiliated. Ignored by Jimmy, Edgar unloads his bad memories on Max, who asks Doug Benson to give them separate assignments in future. Vernon's sleep deprivation is causing him to hallucinate. Lindsay, on her mission to help people, bails out Paul when he is arrested for cycling under the influence. Gretchen does "International Night" with Boone and Olivia but is overly competitive and her strip tease doesn't go down well. Boone tells Gretchen to just be herself around Olivia. Gretchen leaves to go to a work meeting but instead meets up with Jimmy in a bar. They chat about Jimmy having sex with Katherine, get on like old times and kiss.
48	12	"Like People"	Steph Green	Alison Bennett & Eva Anderson	November 15, 2017	XYW04012	0.282
Gretchen wakes up alone in Jimmy's hotel room and has a meltdown, thinking he abandoned her again. She leaves the hotel and meets Jimmy who went to get breakfast. They argue and she heads back to Lindsay's. Jimmy tries to do alone all the things he used to do with Gretchen, and fails. Lindsay decides Gretchen can't be allowed to get involved with Olivia, so she crashes "taco night" at Boone's house and tries to keep them apart. When she confronts Boone with Gretchen's toxicity, Boone says he knows about it and likes her. Boone asks Gretchen to move in and she agrees. Jimmy finds Killian working for an Irish bar to pay off his father's tab. Edgar trails Max to find out why he is ditching him. Doug Benson "promotes" Edgar to on-set writer on a night shoot far out of town. After reconciling with Edgar, Jimmy decides LA is dead for him and decides to leave. He goes home to pack. Gretchen leaves Boone's house in the night. As he leaves his house, Jimmy sees his car seats on fire. On the front seat are fairy lights and a vibrator, the same things that set fire to Gretchen's apartment.
49	13	"It's Always Been This Way"	Stephen Falk	Eva Anderson and Stephen Falk	November 15, 2017	XYW04013	0.188
Vernon zones out from lack of sleep during surgery and nicks an artery. He flees the hospital. Jimmy, in his slightly burned car, meets Gretchen outside Boone's house and they go for a drive. Edgar arrives home and finds Lindsay there. Vernon shows up in a panic, and tries to sleep on the couch. Lindsay calls Gretchen about Vernon being covered in blood. For a moment they think he has killed Becca. Lindsay, Edgar, Jimmy and Gretchen get a drunk Becca from a bar and take her to Vernon. Paul shows up looking for a character reference from Lindsay so he can adopt. Edgar tracks Max down at Doug's house and makes him admit that he is ditching Edgar. Max says that he can't handle Edgar's PTSD, but promises to square things with Doug. At this point Edgar decides he should be his own man. Jimmy and Gretchen go to the shore to talk, where Jimmy says he's leaving LA to write the four books he's contracted for. Gretchen tells him about moving in with Boone, and that they won't even be friends in future. Lindsay fixes up a deal where Becca is host mother for Paul, who pays them enough to cover Vernon's malpractice payout. Lindsay then gets invited to hang out with her previously aloof coworkers, but deletes the message, claiming she is a helper now. Jimmy drops Gretchen at Boone's house, then barges in to "fight for Gretchen". He punches Whitney's husband Neil, thinking he is Boone. In the resulting chaos, Gretchen declares she's done pleasing others and chooses herself. Jimmy leaves, but Gretchen jumps into his car. She slaps him, they kiss, Gretchen puts on the engagement ring and suggests a wedding date. They drive away.

=== Season 5 (2019) ===
No. overall	No. in season	Title	Directed by	Written by	Original release date	Prod. code	U.S. viewers (millions)
50	1	"The Intransigence of Love"	Stephen Falk	Stephen Falk	January 9, 2019	XYW05001	0.265
Jimmy and Gretchen tell fake love stories to prospective wedding planners as they don't have a traditional love story to tell. Jimmy calls their story "an ugly, uncomfortable, haunting, and brilliant love story".
51	2	"The Pin In My Grenade"	Stephen Falk	Philippe Iujvidin	January 16, 2019	XYW05002	0.163
Jimmy and Gretchen reveal to Edgar and Lindsay that they plan on eloping at the Courthouse instead of having a traditional wedding ceremony; Edgar and Lindsay try to convince them otherwise. After Jimmy and Gretchen both individually lose track of time and miss their appointment at the Courthouse, they take it as a sign and set a date for their wedding ceremony.
52	3	"The One Thing We Don't Talk About"	Stephen Falk	Sarah Carbiener & Erica Rosbe	January 23, 2019	XYW05003	0.199
When Jimmy finds out Gretchen is in severe credit card debt, he sells his novel to studio executives to be made into a film despite his aversion to the idea. Gretchen is urged by Lindsay to tell her mother about the wedding. Gretchen procrastinates by doing a lengthy interview process for her new assistant at work; she later just hires Lindsay as her assistant. Edgar is offered to be mentored by Paul F. Tompkins at work, but not in the way he imagined. Jimmy books their wedding venue and Gretchen tells him her call with her mother went better than expected, because Gretchen told her mother she is marrying Boone.
53	4	"What Money?"	Ryan Case	Evan Mann & Gareth Reynolds	January 30, 2019	XYW05004	0.192
Jimmy gets a check of $700,000 for his screenplay and hides it from Gretchen. Jimmy doesn't know what to do with the money so he turns to Paul for financial advice. Paul advises him to hide the money from Gretchen because of her enormous debt and co-dependence issues. Paul breaks his confidentiality agreement with Jimmy and ends up telling Becca and Vernon, who both come to him for money. Jimmy uses the money to pay off his mortgage and buys Gretchen a new car. Gretchen tells Jimmy that they're "turning into grown-ups", which scares them. In a flashforward, Jimmy gets out of the now scratched-up car and his house is in escrow. Meanwhile, Edgar tries to avoid work as Paul F. Tompkins has been passive aggressively torturing him. Gretchen has Lindsay take over managing day-to-day operations for the rap trio of Sam, Shitshain, and the new Honeynutz.
54	5	"A Very Good Boy"	Ryan Case	Marquita J. Robinson	February 6, 2019	XYW05005	0.142
In a flashforward, Gretchen checks into a hotel by herself. Gretchen puts Jimmy in charge of the floral arrangements for their wedding. She remarks on how predictable and stable he has become when he's about to leave to write his screenplay at the same scheduled time at the same coffee shop as always. Jimmy then spends the day trying to break his habits and be a "bad boy". Much to her surprise, Gretchen impresses her boss at work after she recommends a new rapper named Nock Nock as a potential client. Meanwhile, Lindsay and Edgar try and push their "friends with benefits" relationship into a real one. But, after an awkward dinner date, they decide to end it and look for real love. Vernon and Becca have been scamming Paul for $5000 to artificially inseminate Becca, but Paul is unaware they're not actually going through with the procedure.
55	6	"This Brief Fermata"	Ryan Case	April Shih	February 13, 2019	XYW05006	0.162
In a flashforward, Jimmy stands in his now empty house. Feeling guilty about his brief sexual encounter with a florist the previous week, he suggests to Gretchen that they have a week of "no-strings-attached" sex, which she agrees to. He fakes several hook-ups to encourage Gretchen, but she is too busy at work coming up with a marketing campaign for Nock Nock before he signs with them. At the end of the week, he admits his indiscretion with the florist and that it happened before they made the agreement.
56	7	"Zero Eggplants"	Alex Hardcastle	Stephen Falk	February 20, 2019	XYW05007	0.186
In a flashforward, Gretchen and Lindsay sit by the hotel pool, and Lindsay is wearing an engagement ring. Gretchen is still mad at Jimmy over receiving oral sex from the florist, and he jokingly suggests to give oral sex to another man to make it up to her. At a wedding cake tasting, Jimmy and Gretchen make friends with another couple, Rachel and Quinn. They all have dinner together and quickly bond, especially Gretchen and Rachel. Jimmy learns that Quinn knows about his recent problems with Gretchen, because she told Rachel. Desperate for her friendship, Gretchen gets together with Rachel, and they end up talking about wanting children. Gretchen questions if she should be a mother, because she has clinical depression. Rachel then affirms their friendship, telling her "once you're in, you're in for life". Meanwhile, Jimmy fails to meet the ultimatum after using a gay dating app. Talking to Quinn, Jimmy says he has to be comfortable with the guy, and they both awkwardly agree to it. Later that night, Jimmy tells Gretchen he did it with Quinn, much to her surprise. The four have dinner the next night, and Gretchen becomes overwhelmed about the new friendships, so she pretends not to know about what Jimmy and Quinn did. This causes a fight and Rachel and Quinn leave. During the night, Gretchen goes into Edgar's medicine cabinet and swallows several pills and falsely smiles into the mirror.
57	8	"The Pillars of Creation"	Alex Hardcastle	Evan Mann & Gareth Reynolds	February 27, 2019	XYW05008	0.125
Becca and Vernon arrive at the stately mansion of Paul's friend Gilly to spend the weekend of the lunar eclipse with Paul. The three eventually come to argue and it is revealed to Paul that Becca and Vernon were faking the insemination, and Paul reveals he had lined up a 24-year old to be his alternate surrogate. Paul storms off but is then half-seduced by Becca to lay with her, though Vernon interrupts to intimidate Paul. Vernon and Becca fight as Becca claims she only married Vernon as he was a doctor to make Jimmy jealous. Vernon storms off and ends up facing his mistake in the operating room after failing at a children's surgery game. Paul and Becca share a moment looking through the telescope, but then Paul sees Vernon trying to drown himself. After saving Vernon, all three open up to each other separately about their feelings. That night, Paul spies on Vernon and Becca getting intimate, and when noticed, they invite him in and Paul consummates with Becca as Vernon watches. The following morning, Jimmy and Gretchen come across the trio sitting at their diner, and the three are secretly holding hands under the table, insinuating they have become a thruple.
58	9	"Bachelor/Bachelorette Party Sunday Funday"	Alex Hardcastle	Stephen Falk	March 6, 2019	XYW05009	0.197
Edgar and Lindsay, along with Becca, Vernon, and Paul, throw bachelor and bachelorette party on a Sunday Funday in a party bus for Jimmy and Gretchen. During this, several secrets are revealed: Becca is pregnant via Paul, which upsets Lindsay; Edgar lies about liking Jimmy's screenplay; Jimmy and Gretchen discover they disagree about several issues, including whether or not to have kids. The group later pulls off an elaborate prank on Jimmy and Gretchen with the involvement of Paul F. Tompkins, which includes the "murder" of Vernon and Jimmy and Gretchen having to shoot and kill Tompkins after he threatens the rest of the group. Later, after the prank is revealed, Lindsay and Paul reconcile; Edgar and Jimmy agree to collaborate on his screenplay, and Edgar reveals that Gretchen has been stealing some of his stronger medicine.
59	10	"Magical Thinking"	Jordan Vogt-Roberts	Marquita J. Robinson & Jane E. Sussman	March 13, 2019	XYW05010	0.124
In a flashforward, Jimmy picks up the florist from her apartment. Gretchen is busy and stressed out planning a premiere party featuring the rap trio and Nock Nock and the debut of their new song. Jimmy and Edgar work together on the screenplay, and Edgar now sees himself as an equal. Jimmy still hasn't confronted Gretchen about her taking Edgar's medicine. Edgar explains to Jimmy that he needs to involve himself in parts of Gretchen's life that don't directly affect him. Lindsay has a sexual encounter with Gretchen's boss, Yvette. After listening to the song, Gretchen realizes that Nock Nock's part overshadows the rap trio's and they know it too; Gretchen is conflicted about which version of the song to play. Feeling stressed, Gretchen calls Jimmy for reassurance. Before the song is played, Gretchen sets off the sprinkler system and everyone vacates the party.
60	11	"Four Goddamn More Days"	Jordan Vogt-Roberts	Philippe Iujvidin	March 20, 2019	XYW05011	0.178
In a flashforward, Gretchen goes to the hotel bar and meets a man and begins to tell the story about how she "almost got married once". Gretchen takes more of Edgar's pills, by crushing and snorting them. Gretchen has been fired from work due to the fiasco with her setting off the fire alarm, but is keeping it secret from Jimmy and she pretends to go to work. Jimmy and Edgar discover that their script won't be used and will instead be rewritten by Diablo Cody; this puts Jimmy into a depression. Edgar learns that Gretchen has been fired after he calls her work, but doesn't tell Jimmy. Edgar throws out all his medicine, which Gretchen later discovers. Yvette ends her relationship with Lindsay, and fires her for stealing documents, which she was giving to Gretchen. Edgar follows Gretchen and he confronts her about her behavior; Gretchen is scared Jimmy will leave her if he finds out she was fired. Upon returning home, Gretchen finds the house filled with flowers and candles and Jimmy presents the wedding dress he has bought her. Gretchen then confesses about being fired and taking the pills, but Jimmy reassures her everything will be alright. However, when they hug, Jimmy is visibly shocked and concerned.
61	12	"We Were Having Such a Nice Day"	Jordan Vogt-Roberts	Sarah Carbiener & Erica Rosbe	March 27, 2019	XYW05012	0.168
In a flashforward, Edgar plays in the forest with a small child, possibly his own. Present day, Jimmy and Gretchen have finished their wedding planning and split off for Jimmy to have a best man day with Edgar, while Gretchen gets dolled up for the wedding with Lindsay. Jimmy is taken through a series of events to resemble his life: Curling, a sport Jimmy apparently reveres, a rage cage where Jimmy both smashes various things, and embraces a likeness of his father, and finally a fancy high roller club where they run into the hipster thief from Sunday Funday. At the end, Jimmy and Edgar have a heart to heart which ends with Edgar telling Jimmy not to marry Gretchen, and that they'll destroy each other. Jimmy tells Edgar he never wants to see him again. Meanwhile, Gretchen's mother crashes the makeup day and Lindsay runs away. Gretchen ends up confronting her mother over her toxic parenting while her mother reveals how unsatisfied she is with her own life, choosing however to remain in her world of fantasy instead of facing reality. Lindsay ends up with Paul, Becca, and Vernon deliberating over their future child and who would keep it, ending in them threatening each other until Paul calls Becca's bluffs. Paul and Lindsay seem to reconnect romantically slightly.
62	13	"Pancakes"	Stephen Falk	Stephen Falk	April 3, 2019	XYW05013	0.160
It's the day of Jimmy and Gretchen's wedding. Jimmy is still angry at Edgar and wants an apology. Edgar waits in his vehicle just in case Jimmy wants to bail on the wedding. Both Lindsay and Gretchen share their ill will toward Edgar and what he has done to the group. Especially Gretchen, who tells Edgar Jimmy will never respect him and that she hates him. Jimmy is mad at Gretchen over her lack of involvement in the wedding–such as not buying her own wedding dress or writing her own vows–and he questions if she really wants to get married. Jimmy then realizes he doesn't want to marry her and he leaves. Gretchen follows Jimmy outside and he agrees that the ceremony is a "fiction", because he doesn't know how you can promise to love someone forever. They then leave together and go for pancakes. At the diner, they make a vow that each day, they will choose to stay together. Several years later, Jimmy and Gretchen, now with a young daughter, reunite with Edgar at Lindsay and Paul's wedding, which is at the same venue Jimmy and Gretchen's planned wedding was at. Jimmy forgives Edgar and calls what he did a "brave and selfless act". In flashforwards leading up to Lindsay and Paul's wedding, Gretchen has an ultrasound, revealing she's pregnant; Gretchen and Jimmy decide their house is too dangerous for children; Edgar moves to New York City; Vernon starts his mobile medical unit; now with a child, Paul proposes to Lindsay; Jimmy and Gretchen care for their child; Gretchen cries in bed feeling overwhelmed. In the present at the diner, Gretchen warns Jimmy that there is still possibility she might leave and "step in front of a train". They then eat breakfast together.

== Ratings ==
You’re the Worst : U.S. viewers per episode (thousands)

Season	Episode number													Average
Season	1	2	3	4	5	6	7	8	9	10	11	12	13	Average
1	765	610	393	565	415	555	533	472	535	552	–			560
2	301	267	233	294	198	132	182	240	234	185	188	175	269	223
3	347	269	350	207	196	218	244	198	176	115	181	200	137	218
4	298	246	224	261	221	256	206	311	139	204	205	282	188	234
5	265	163	199	192	142	162	186	125	197	124	178	168	160	174

Audience measurement performed by Nielsen Media Research
