= We Are All Completely Fine =

2014 horror novel by Daryl Gregory

- Author: Daryl Gregory
- Language: English
- Publisher: Tachyon Publications
- Publication date: July 21, 2014
- Pages: 182
- ISBN: 9781616961718 Paperback

We Are All Completely Fine is a 2014 horror novel by Daryl Gregory. It was first published by Tachyon Publications. The book won the 2015 World Fantasy Award—Novella and the 2014 Shirley Jackson Award for Best Novella.

== Synopsis ==
At a support group for people who have survived supernatural horror, the members' worst fears are confirmed.

== Reception ==
=== Reviews ===
Publishers Weekly described it as "complex" and "scathingly funny, [and] horrific yet oddly inspiring", and lauded Gregory's use of "beautiful imagery and metaphors".

At Strange Horizons, Carmen Maria Machado judged the novella as "slight", saying that it "skims a little too lightly over its own plot" and gives insufficient attention to the characters' lives, in particular noting that Harrison and Martin's stories felt incomplete, and observing that Stan, "though his personal story is horrific in detail, seem[ed] to function mostly as comic relief". Machado did, however, praise Gregory's use of "the collective first person—we, us" to begin each chapter, calling it a "pleasurable stylistic gesture [that] serves a fascinating purpose—creating a group mind that throbs and thinks above all of [its members]" while also "speak[ing] to a larger point about group therapy." Ultimately, Machado concluded that the book would have benefited from being a full-length novel.

Tor.com's Lee Mandelo similarly "want[ed] more than [the] novella (...) delivered", and judged that "once the plot began to thicken and the supernatural action got afoot, the interesting character dynamics and development more or less just stopped," faulting it for not sustaining the tension introduced by its "strong" premise, and finding the revelation about Jan's identity to be "pretty familiar and easy to see coming."

=== Awards ===
Awards for We Are All Completely Fine
Year	Award	Result	Ref.
2014	Nebula Award for Best Novella	Finalist	
2014	Shirley Jackson Award: Best Novella	Winner	
2015	Locus Award for Best Novella	Finalist	
2015	Theodore Sturgeon Memorial Award	Finalist	
2015	World Fantasy Award—Novella	Winner	

== Prequel ==
In 2015, Gregory released Harrison Squared, a young adult novel about the early life of one of the characters from We Are All Completely Fine.
