= Poussey Washington =

Fictional character from Orange Is the New Black

- Orange Is the New Black character
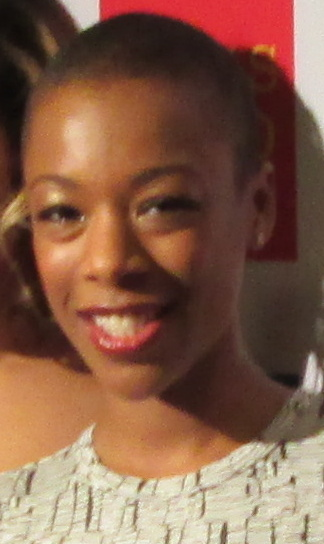
- First appearance: "Tit Punch"; Season 1, episode 2 July 11, 2013
- Last appearance: "The Big House"; Season 7, episode 12; July 26, 2019
- Portrayed by: Samira Wiley; Jade Tuck (Young)

In-universe information
- Family: James Washington (father)
- Significant other: Brook Soso (girlfriend)
- Nationality: American

Poussey Washington is a fictional character played by Samira Wiley on the Netflix series Orange Is the New Black. She is a recurring character in the first two seasons and a main character during the third and fourth seasons.

== Casting and background ==
Wiley was first told about the auditions for Orange is the New Black by a friend from Juilliard, Marco Ramirez, who was a writer for the show. After she discovered that another Juilliard friend, Danielle Brooks, had won a role in the show, Wiley asked Brooks to rehearse lines with her to prepare for her audition for the role of Poussey Washington, the on-screen best friend of Brooks' character, Tasha "Taystee" Jefferson. Wiley's audition was ultimately successful; she appeared in 12 out of 13 episodes of the series' first season and was featured throughout the second season. Orange Is the New Black is Wiley's first time as a series regular. Wiley stated that she bartended while filming the first season because she didn't know if she would continue to work with the show, mentioning a previous show that she was listed as "recurring" and not being asked to return after the second episode.

== Storylines ==
=== Season One ===
Poussey is first seen in the second episode. However, her character is not properly mentioned until the third episode. She has been in prison for two years at the start of the series, with four years to go. She is almost always shown with Tasha "Taystee" Jefferson (Danielle Brooks), either supporting her or messing around together. When Taystee is granted release on parole, Poussey becomes upset and agitated when she doesn't speak to Taystee before her release. As Taystee is being released, Poussey tries to get her attention; she catches her eye and Taystee does a little dance, which Poussey laughs at through the window. Her mother died during her second year in prison, as revealed in the twelfth episode. Poussey is a good-natured jokester and is revealed to have a good heart; when Tricia Miller (Madeline Brewer) dies, she gives her friends a bottle of her prison-made toilet hooch to help them mourn their loss. When Taystee is re-incarcerated due to a parole violation, Poussey becomes visibly annoyed, but they nonetheless quickly resume their friendship. She is revealed to have a good singing voice in the Christmas play, where she sings a rendition of "Amazing Grace" with Taystee and Cindy "Black Cindy" Hayes (Adrienne C. Moore) during a Christmas performance.

=== Season Two ===
It is implied that Poussey is romantically in love with her best friend Taystee, but the feelings are not mutual. This is explored throughout the season. Poussey is approached by Yvonne "Vee" Parker (Lorraine Toussaint) about selling her prison-made toilet hooch, Poussey rejects the idea as she prefers to share it with her friends. Vee takes this as an insult and punishes Poussey over this perceived lack of loyalty and loss of potential business by exploiting her unreciprocated romantic feelings for Taystee to isolate her from the tribe, causing a rift in their relationship. Poussey is one of the few black inmates that does not fall for Vee's manipulation tactics and she begins a campaign to fight Vee's influence and actions throughout the season. Vee uses Poussey's affection for Taystee against her, and their beef becomes violent, much so that at one point, Suzanne "Crazy Eyes" Warren (Uzo Aduba) threatens and physically assaults her on Vee's non-verbal command, which causes Poussey deep emotional trauma. Eventually, Poussey retaliates and causes irreparable damage to Vee's tobacco business by stomping on several tins of tobacco and pouring bleach on them. Realizing that she cannot be intimidated, Vee decides to mollify her by ejecting Taystee from her gang, which she takes out on Poussey. They later make up after a final confrontation in the library.

In flashbacks during the season, some of Poussey's life overseas as a military brat while her father James (Thaddeus Daniels), then a major in the United States Army stationed at United States Army Garrison Hohenfels, Germany is revealed. She was in a sexual relationship with Franziska (Nina Rausch), the daughter of her father's German superior officer Oberstleutnant Jürgen Mertensacker (Stephan Lee Anderson). Revealed to be homophobic, it is implied Jürgen used his influence to get Poussey's father reassigned outside of Germany shortly after he walked in on Poussey and his daughter having sex. The sudden reassignment devastates Poussey, and after initially telling Franziska that their relationship was casual she admits to Jürgen that she loves her. When Jürgen confirms to Poussey that her feelings for his daughter are the reason her father is getting reassigned she attempts to kill him, but her father stops her from pulling a gun on him.

=== Season Three ===
Poussey becomes interested in the apparent spiritual teachings of Norma Romano (Annie Golden). After her trouble with Vee and memories of her deceased mother, she becomes depressed and turns to alcohol. She also immerses herself in Suzanne's sci-fi erotica book. She eventually concludes that she feels the way she does because she is lonely, without a girlfriend. In the final episode of the season, Poussey discovers Brook Soso (Kimiko Glenn) in the library after an overdose on Benadryl. She, along with Taystee and Suzanne, nurses Brook back to health. After the incident, Brook is accepted into Poussey's group of friends as one of their own. Brook and Poussey are later seen holding hands and joking around on the beach behind Litchfield, implying a budding relationship.

=== Season Four ===
Poussey becomes overjoyed when her favorite celebrity chef, Judy King (Blair Brown) is sent to Litchfield to serve her sentence for tax fraud. Judy is initially assigned to Poussey's bunk in the ghetto, but Joe Caputo (Nick Sandow) quickly removes Judy to put her in a more private area due to orders from MCC to give her special treatment because of her celebrity status. Poussey frequently gets star-struck around Judy, leaving her bemused with the impression she has an intellectual disability. At the same time, a romantic relationship between Poussey and Brook develops throughout the fourth season, though it was temporarily jeopardized when Brook told Judy an offensive and stereotypical narrative of Poussey's background to explain her seemingly odd behavior around her, to include Brook telling Judy that Poussey's mother was a drug addict. Later, Poussey and Brook realize that part of the reason this situation happened because the two do not know each other very well. They resolve to get to know each other's backgrounds.

In the penultimate episode of the fourth season, Poussey is accidentally suffocated by CO Baxter "Gerber" Bayley (Alan Aisenberg) during an initially peaceful demonstration in the cafeteria to protest Captain Desi Piscatella (Brad William Henke) and his unfair treatment of the inmates, where inmates stood on tables and demanded his resignation. When Piscatella calls additional guards for backup, Suzanne becomes upset upon seeing CO Thomas "Humps" Humphrey (Michael Torpey), and Poussey attempts to de-escalate the situation. Piscatella orders Bayley to restrain Suzanne and escort her to psych, which caused Poussey to intervene. While struggling with Suzanne, Bayley improperly restrains Poussey face down while kneeling on her back. As Suzanne continues to struggle with Bayley, he continues to put all of his weight on Poussey, who is unable to breathe and suffocates to death. Angered by the morally questionable response to events, Caputo sends Piscatella home, debriefs Bayley, and contacts MCC. It becomes apparent to Caputo, staff, and inmates, that no response plan exists to address the death of an inmate in general population; Poussey's body is left on the cafeteria floor for a day until the coroner arrives. During MCC's attempt to put the blame on Poussey for her death, it is revealed that she was in prison only as a non-violent offender; she had been convicted of trespassing and possession with intent to sell less than a half-ounce of unspecified drugs. Inmates and staff appear shaken by Poussey's death; Norma comforts Brook by rocking and singing to her, and Brook later gets drunk off the remainder of Poussey's contraband alcohol. Inmates stop by a makeshift memorial, donating food and giving their condolences. Caputo contacts her father James after being asked to do so by Taystee and is visibly upset at having to do so.

Shortly after her death, she appears in several flashbacks that took place in New York City prior to her incarceration. She rides into the city on a bus with two of her friends, who later take her to a nightclub. While taking a picture with her phone, someone steals her phone and flees. She chases the thief and gets lost after being unable to catch them, which results in her running into two people that offer to help her find her friends on the condition that she goes to an alternative club with them. Following her time in the club and getting a chance to call her friends, she heads towards them on the subway and then catches a ride with men dressed as monks participating in Improv Everywhere. While smoking with one of the men, Poussey reveals to him that she lost an appointment to West Point due to her actions in Germany with Franziska and her father Jürgen, and she then states that she was planning to move to Amsterdam in two weeks after she sold off the remainder of her drugs. Appearing to break the fourth wall, she is looking at the river and laughing before she turns to the camera and smiles.

=== Season Five ===
Poussey's death continues to be a central issue during the riot. Justice for her is one of the main demands Taystee is pushing for, and she rejects ending the riot in negotiations when the Governor of New York is unable to offer Bayley's prosecution for Poussey's death. She appears in a flashback scene, which shows her meeting Taystee in the prison library during Taystee's second day at Litchfield and how they became friends. Her father James appears onscreen and angrily dismisses Bayley when he comes to his house in an attempt to beg him for forgiveness for her death.

=== Season Six ===
Poussey continues to play an important role during the season, with Taystee bringing her up during her murder trial and to Caputo in her quest to get justice and have Bayley charged with her death.

=== Season Seven ===
Poussey appears in a flashback that takes place during the events of the first season. She was talking to Taystee on the phone while Taystee was out on parole and the two joked around with each other. In the final episode of the series, Taystee and Judy team up to start the Poussey Washington Fund, an initiative to grant women released from prison microloans to help them get back on their feet after they are released from prison.

== Reception ==
The New Yorker television critic Emily Nussbaum mentions the online outrage and grief among viewers to her death. Nussbaum then states that Poussey's death "was an earned tragedy, resonant for reasons beyond simply “sending a message” about the Black Lives Matter movement" and that "Poussey was educated, world-travelled, and middle-class, but she died as any black inmate might, as a cipher crushed by a racist system." Fellow cast members were reportedly outraged over series creator Jenji Kohan's decision to kill off Poussey in the fourth season. Kohan spoke about the difficulty of killing her off and the reaction of the cast, but stated that she felt it was a story that needed to be told. Wiley's costars Danielle Brooks and Uzo Aduba spoke on the impact Poussey had on the Black Lives Matter movement.

== Poussey Washington Fund ==
Series creator Jenji Kohan partnered with several non-profit organizations and GoFundMe to start the Poussey Washington Fund, named for Wiley's character Poussey, to assist with female inmates and immigrants. Composed of eight different groups, the stated goals of the fund are to benefit "criminal justice reform, protecting immigrants' rights, ending mass incarceration and supporting women who have been affected by it." The Poussey Washington Fund was announced by Wiley during a video that appeared at Orange is the New Black's final premiere and was officially started when the seventh season debuted.

== See also ==
- List of Orange Is the New Black characters
