= They Fight =

- Official release poster
- Directed by: Sheldon Candis
- Written by: Sheldon Candis; Andrew Renzi
- Based on: They Fight by Andrew Renzi
- Produced by: Jason Michael Berman; Ben Renzo; Andrew Renzi
- Starring: André Holland; Wendell Pierce; Samira Wiley; Anthony B. Jenkins; Toissaint Francois Battiste; Mykelti Williamson
- Cinematography: Mark Jeevaratnam
- Edited by: Nona Khodai
- Music by: Gary Gunn
- Production companies: A/Vantage Pictures; Andscape; Argent Pictures; Common Films; Green/Renzi; Mandalay Pictures; North of Now Group
- Distributed by: Hulu
- Release dates: June 8, 2026 (Tribeca Festival); July 17, 2026 (United States)
- Running time: 93 minutes
- Country: United States
- Language: English

They Fight is a 2026 American sports drama film directed by Sheldon Candis and co-written by Andrew Renzi. It stars André Holland, Wendell Pierce, Samira Wiley, Anthony B. Jenkins, Toissaint Francois Battiste, and Mykelti Williamson. It is based on the 2018 documentary film of the same name.

The film premiered at the Tribeca Festival on June 8, 2026, and was released on Hulu on July 17.

== Plot ==
Recently released from prison, coach Walt Manigan joins a local youth gym to help a ragtag team of adolescent boxers aspiring to a national championship.

== Cast ==
- André Holland as Walt Manigan
- Wendell Pierce as Slim
- Samira Wiley as Ketta
- Anthony B. Jenkins as Peanut
- Toissaint Francois Battiste as Quincey
- Mykelti Williamson as Coach Mac
- Erika Woods as Beverly
- Aaliyah Mayo as Lashawna
- Khawaja Aziz as Referee (uncredited)
- Patrick Armstrong as Referee (uncredited)
- Salvatore Seeley as Referee (uncredited)

== Production ==
Principal photography had wrapped in December 2025, on a sports drama film based on the 2018 documentary film They Fight. It starred André Holland, Wendell Pierce, Samira Wiley, Anthony B. Jenkins, Toissaint Francois Battiste, and Mykelti Williamson. In April 2026, the first film was selected to screen at the Tribeca Festival. Filming took place in Baltimore in October and November 2025.

== Release ==
They Fight premiered at the Tribeca Festival on June 8, 2026, and was released on Hulu on July 17, 2026.
