= Gregory Burke =

Scottish playwright (born 1968)

Gregory Burke (born 1968) is a Scottish playwright and screenwriter from Rosyth, Fife.

== Early life and education ==
Burke's family moved to Gibraltar in 1979 and returned to Dunfermline in 1984. He attended St John's Primary in Rosyth, St Christopher's Middle School and Bayside Comprehensive in Gibraltar, and St Columba's High School, Dunfermline. He attended the University of Stirling for two years before dropping out.

== Works ==
Burke's first play was Gagarin Way, set in the factories of West Fife. His play Black Watch, for the National Theatre of Scotland, debuted at the 2006 Edinburgh Festival Fringe, meeting with critical acclaim. Black Watch has since been performed throughout Scotland and has also toured theatres internationally. Burke has also written Occy Eyes, The Straits, Unsecured, On Tour, Liar, and Shell Shocked. His most recent play was Hoors, which opened at the Traverse Theatre on 1 May 2009.

== Controversy ==
Burke's time at Stirling University was cut short by an attack he and three others made on a fellow student. In May 2009, Burke turned down an honorary degree from Stirling, stating he wanted to avoid any embarrassment to the institution. According to the victim's family, he has not contacted them to apologize for this attack.

== List of works ==
=== Plays ===
- Black Watch
- The Chain Play (with others)
- Unsecured
- Gagarin Way
- Hoors
- Liar
- On Tour
- The Party
- The Straits

=== Film ===
- '71 (2014)
- Entebbe (2018)

=== Television ===
- One Night in Emergency (2010)
- Six Four (2023)
- Rebus (2024)
- Atomic (2025)
