= Samira Wiley =

American actress

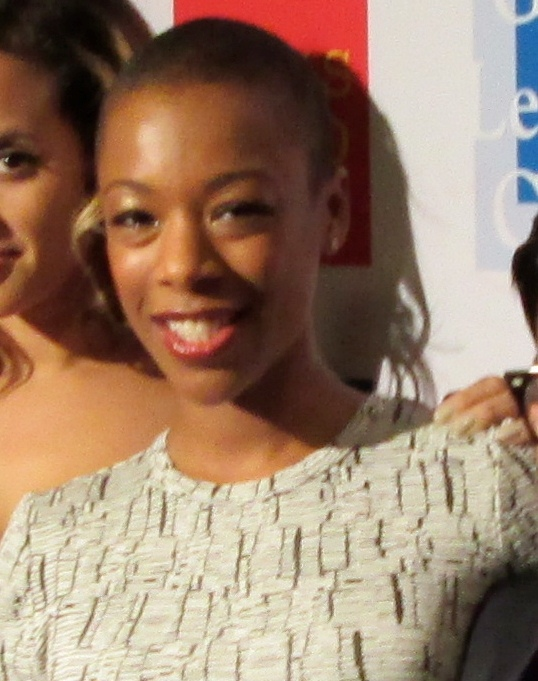
- Wiley in 2013
- Born: Washington, D.C., U.S.
- Education: Temple University (attended); Juilliard School (BFA)
- Occupation: Actress
- Years active: 2011–present
- Spouse: Lauren Morelli (m. 2017; div. 2026)
- Children: 1
- Relatives: Asante Blackk (nephew)

Samira Wiley is an American actress. She is best known for her starring role as Poussey Washington in the Netflix comedy-drama series Orange Is the New Black (2013–2019) and as Moira in the Hulu dystopian drama series The Handmaid's Tale (2017–2025), for which she won the Primetime Emmy Award for Outstanding Guest Actress in a Drama Series.

Wiley also had starring roles in such films as The Sitter (2011), Nerve (2016), Detroit (2017), and Social Animals (2018). She also narrated the Netflix documentary Night on Earth (2020).

== Early life ==
Wiley was raised in Washington, D.C. Her parents, Christine and Dennis W. Wiley, were co-pastors of the Covenant Baptist United Church of Christ (CBUCC) until 2017; they have been described as "pillars of the LGBT religious community", as the CBUCC was the only Baptist church in D.C. performing same-sex civil unions in 2007, prior to the eventual legalization of same-sex marriage. She has two siblings, Aiyana Ma'at and Joshua Wiley.

Wiley attended the Duke Ellington School of the Arts, D.C., and the Juilliard School, New York City, graduating in 2010. At Juilliard, she trained in theater performance, and worked mainly in theater in her early career.

== Career ==
Wiley's first major acting role was in the comedy film The Sitter (2011). In 2011, Wiley played Maria in a theater production of Love's Labour's Lost by The Public Theater.

When the Netflix television series Orange Is the New Black —based on Piper Kerman's memoir of the same name— came into development, Wiley was told about the auditions by a friend from Juilliard, Marco Ramirez, who was a writer for the show. Wiley's future wife, Lauren Morelli, was also a writer on the show. After discovering that fellow Juilliard alumni and friend, actress Danielle Brooks, had also auditioned for, and won, the role of Taystee, Wiley asked to rehearse her lines with her, as she was auditioning for the role of Poussey Washington (the on-screen best friend of Brooks' character), a role for which she was ultimately cast. After winning the audition, Wiley appeared in all twelve episodes of the series' first season, and featured prominently throughout the second season. The darker, more violent, plot of the second season allowed for the growth of Wiley's character, whose evolved storylines and level-headed, peaceable nature led to Wiley's prolonged screen exposure and ultimate development as a fan-favorite. Her character's childhood and adolescence as a traveled, educated and strictly-disciplined "military brat" are explored, in addition to the chain of events leading up to her incarceration. Wiley was promoted to series-regular for the third season. The fourth season revolves heavily around her character, leading up to the stunned and saddened reactions within the prison upon her beloved character's untimely passing at the hands of a young prison officer, while being detained during a peaceful protest in the prison.

In between seasons of Orange Is the New Black, Wiley filmed Rob the Mob (2014), an independent crime film directed by Raymond De Felitta. She appeared in an advertisement for the digital monetary service PayPal in 2014. In 2015, Wiley featured in the 21st episode of the 16th season of Law & Order: Special Victims Unit, "Perverted Justice", portraying a young adult wishing to recant her rape accusation of her father when she was 6 years old, and set him free. In December 2015, it was announced Wiley had been cast to voice the titular character in the video game The Walking Dead: Michonne. The game was released by Telltale Games in February 2016. In 2017, she narrated one of two versions of Max Brooks' book, Minecraft: The Island: A Novel. Wiley also starred in a film called 37 (2016), a true story of thirty-seven people who witness a murder and none call the police or intervene. In 2016, she starred in a new play by Quiara Alegría Hudes called Daphne's Dive.

She competed against New Black co-star Laverne Cox in an episode of Spike's Lip Sync Battle. With performances of "Un-Break My Heart" by Toni Braxton and "O.P.P." by Naughty by Nature, Wiley emerged victorious.

Wiley was featured in Maniac Magazine, appearing on the cover and in an editorial of the 2014 September/October issue displaying "a series of bold, chic, high fashion looks." She was also featured on the cover of 2014 edition of Out magazine, along with Sam Smith, Elliot Page, and Zachary Quinto.

In 2017, Wiley began playing Moira in the Hulu television series The Handmaid's Tale. She portrayed the playwright Lorraine Hansberry in the docu-series Equal in 2020. In 2022, she co-produced a documentary about body positivity with the Gratitude Project. In 2024, she was cast as a CIA agent in the Sky Original series Atomic.

It was announced in June 2025 that Wiley would be voicing a character in an 2D-adult animation entitled Standing By created by Dan Levy and Ally Pankiw. It was reported that the series would premiere on August 8, but this did not happen. The series, produced by 20th Television Animation, had a presentation in August 2021, and was ordered by Hulu in December 2022.

== Awards ==
In 2014, Wiley was named Out magazine's Ingenue of the Year. In February 2015, she was awarded the Human Rights Campaign's Visibility Award. According to the Human Rights Campaign's website, Wiley was always accepted and embraced by her parents, regardless of her sexuality, and to this she attributes her success.

In 2017, Wiley received an Emmy Award nomination for Outstanding Supporting Actress in a Drama Series for her role in the Hulu series The Handmaid's Tale, going on to win Outstanding Guest Actress in a Drama Series the following year.

In November 2017, Wiley was nominated to Out magazine's "OUT100" for 2017 in recognition of her work and her visibility.

== Personal life ==
On October 4, 2016, Wiley announced her engagement to Orange Is the New Black writer Lauren Morelli and they married on March 25, 2017. Morelli gave birth to their first child, a daughter, on April 11, 2021. On January 29, 2026, it was reported that Wiley and Morelli were filing for divorce amicably.

== Filmography ==
=== Film ===
Year	Title	Role	Notes
2011	The Sitter	Tina	
2012	Being Flynn	Asha	
2014	Rob the Mob	Agent Annie Bell	
2016	Nerve	Hacker Kween	
2016	37	Joyce Smith	
2017	Detroit	Vanessa	
2018	Social Animals	Lana	
2019	Vault	Karyn	
2021	Breaking News in Yuba County	Jonelle	
2026	Tangles	Donimo (voice)	
2026	They Fight	Ketta	

=== Television ===
Year	Title	Role	Notes
2011	Unforgettable	Gina	2 episodes
2012	Person of Interest	Triage Nurse	Episode: "Many Happy Returns"
2013–2017, 2019	Orange Is the New Black	Poussey Washington	Main role (seasons 3–4); recurring (seasons 1–2); guest (seasons 5, 7); 51 episodes Screen Actors Guild Award for Outstanding Performance by an Ensemble in a Comedy Series (2015–17)
2015	Law & Order: Special Victims Unit	Michelle	Episode: "Perverted Justice"
2016	The Catch	Captain Nia Brooks	Episode: "The Benefactor"
2016	Lip Sync Battle	Herself	Episode: "Samira Wiley vs. Laverne Cox"
2016–2019	You're the Worst	Justina Jordan	6 episodes
2017–2025	The Handmaid's Tale	Moira Strand	46 episodes Primetime Emmy Award for Outstanding Guest Actress in a Drama Series (2018); Nominated—Primetime Emmy Award for Outstanding Supporting Actress in a Drama Series (2017, 2020–21); Nominated—Screen Actors Guild Award for Outstanding Performance by an Ensemble in a Drama Series; Nominated—NAACP Image Award for Outstanding Supporting Actress in a Drama Series
2017	Last Week Tonight With John Oliver	Forensic Scientist	Episode: "Forensic Evidence" (CSI: Crime Scene Idiot skit)
2017–2019	Ryan Hansen Solves Crimes on Television	Jessica Mathers	10 episodes
2018–2021	Explained	Narrator	2 episodes
2019	Drunk History	Bessie Coleman	Episode: "Trailblazers"
2019	Love, Death & Robots	Lieutenant Colby (voice)	Episode: "Lucky 13"
2019	Will & Grace	Nikki	3 episodes
2020	Night on Earth	Narrator	6 episodes
2020	Equal	Lorraine Hansberry	Episode: "Black is Beautiful, Gay is Good!"
2021–2022	Blade Runner: Black Lotus	Alani Davis (voice)	10 episodes
2025	Atomic	Cassie Elliot / Dr. Cassandra Bryce	4 episodes

=== Video game ===
Year	Title	Voice role	Notes	Ref.
2016	The Walking Dead: Michonne	Michonne	Nominated—BTVA Video Game Voice Acting Award for Best Female Lead Vocal Performance in a Video Game	

== See also ==
- LGBT culture in New York City
- List of LGBT people from New York City
- NYC Pride March
