= Lauren Morelli =

American screenwriter

- Born: Pittsburgh, Pennsylvania, U.S.
- Occupations: Writer; producer; director
- Years active: 2013–present
- Spouses: Stephen Basilone (m. 2012; div. 2014) Samira Wiley (m. 2017; div. 2026)
- Children: 1

Lauren Morelli is an American television writer, producer, and director.

== Early life ==
Morelli, who grew up in the Pittsburgh suburb of McCandless, Pennsylvania, graduated from Winchester Thurston School and then studied dance at Marymount Manhattan College in New York City, until a back injury ended her career in dance.

== Career ==
After several years of mourning the loss of her dancing career, Morelli was inspired by a college professor to pursue a career in writing. She began with short stories and small blog pieces until she landed her first professional writing position on the 2013 Netflix series Orange Is the New Black. She was appointed the role of "lead writer" for two episodes of the first season of Orange Is the New Black, "WAC-Pack" and "Tall Men with Feelings". Morelli has also worked as a playwright: her short play "Roach & Rat" was featured in Lesser America's production of Just Right Just Now in New York.

== Awards ==
Morelli has been nominated for the 2014 Online Film and Television Association's award for Best Writing in a Comedy Series and the 2014 and 2015 Writers Guild of America's award for Best Comedy Series, for her work on Orange Is the New Black, along with several other writers from the show.

== Personal life ==
In September 2014, Morelli filed for divorce from her husband of two years, Steve Basilone. On October 4, 2016, Morelli announced her engagement to actress Samira Wiley, with whom she had been in a relationship since publicly coming out. They married on March 25, 2017. Morelli gave birth to their daughter, named George Elizabeth, on April 11, 2021. On January 29, 2026, it was reported that Morelli and Wiley are filing for divorce amicably.

== See also ==
- LGBT culture in New York City
- List of LGBT people from New York City
- NYC Pride March
