= You're the Worst =

American comedy-drama television series

- Genre: Comedy drama Romantic comedy Black comedy
- Created by: Stephen Falk
- Starring: Chris Geere; Aya Cash; Desmin Borges; Kether Donohue
- Opening theme: "7:30 AM" by Slothrust
- Composer: Adam Blau
- Country of origin: United States
- Original language: English
- No. of seasons: 5
- No. of episodes: 62 (list of episodes)

Production
- Executive producer: Stephen Falk
- Production location: Los Angeles
- Camera setup: Single-camera
- Running time: 21–35 minutes
- Production companies: Hooptie Entertainment; FXP (Note: Credited as FX Productions for first two seasons)

Original release
- Network: FX
- Release: July 17 – September 18, 2014
- Network: FXX
- Release: September 9, 2015 – April 3, 2019

You're the Worst is an American comedy-drama television series created by Stephen Falk. Originally broadcast by FX, the series moved to its sister channel FXX beginning with the second season. The series follows Jimmy (Chris Geere), a self-involved writer, and Gretchen (Aya Cash), a self-destructive PR executive, as they attempt a relationship, along with their friends Edgar (Desmin Borges) and Lindsay (Kether Donohue). The series premiered on July 17, 2014.

In September 2014, FX renewed the show for a thirteen-episode second season, which premiered on FXX on September 9, 2015. The second season shifted its focus towards clinical depression and its effect on modern relationships. In September 2016, FX renewed the series for a fourth season, which premiered on September 6, 2017. In November 2017, FX renewed the series for a fifth and final season which premiered on January 9, 2019. The final episode aired on April 3, 2019.

== Plot ==
Jimmy and Gretchen meet at the wedding of Vernon and Becca Barbara. Becca rejected Jimmy's marriage proposal two years earlier, and he is convinced she only invited him to throw her marriage to Vernon in his face, but he showed up anyway, determined to ruin her day as payback. Gretchen came as the guest of Becca's sister Lindsay, who is Gretchen's best friend and the enabler of her sex-drugs-and-rock'n'roll lifestyle. Gretchen is the publicist for a rap trio and lives in a chaotic apartment, while Jimmy, a writer, can support himself in upscale Silver Lake and drive a BMW despite his second published novel, written during his post-breakup depression, having sold little ("sales were flatter than expected", as Edgar says) and being remaindered at the local bookstore. He supports himself by writing for glossy magazines, in addition to the tiny royalty checks that occasionally arrive in his mailbox.

He and Gretchen meet as Jimmy is being thrown out of the wedding reception after whispering something offensive to Becca, while Gretchen has decided to run off with one of the bride's wrapped gifts (to her disappointment, it is a blender instead of a food processor). Claiming to have no interest in a relationship, the two hook up that night. Over the next few weeks, despite setting out to just "hang out and have fun" without obligation, they find themselves becoming closer.

In a parallel story, Lindsay is married to affluent, conventional Paul, who is decent but plain with somewhat nerdy interests like astronomy, beer-brewing, and cycling. The loveless marriage was mainly Lindsay's attempt to outdo her older sister Becca by marrying first and having more material goods. The marriage falls apart when Lindsay returns to drinking and drug-using, and cheats with another man. For her part, Becca is no happier with her husband Vernon, an immature man who is only interested in hanging out with friends in his man-cave, drinking while watching sports and videos.

Jimmy also has a roommate named Edgar, an Iraq War veteran suffering from post-traumatic stress disorder (PTSD), living in his house. Throughout the first season, it is hinted that Jimmy expected the arrangement to be temporary and he sometimes wonders aloud when Edgar will move out. Over time it becomes clear that Jimmy has come to rely on Edgar's cooking and housework, as well as his friendship.

== Cast and characters ==
=== Main ===
- Chris Geere as Jimmy Shive-Overly, a selfish and insensitive British writer living in Los Angeles. Jimmy excuses his insensitive behavior as merely "telling it like it is".
- Aya Cash as Gretchen Cutler, a cynical and reckless music PR executive.
- Desmin Borges as Edgar Quintero, an Iraq War veteran suffering from PTSD and Jimmy's best friend and roommate.
- Kether Donohue as Lindsay Jillian (née Cottumaccio), Gretchen's "loose" best friend who "sold out" by marrying a nerdy man for his money.

=== Recurring ===
- Janet Varney as Becca Barbara (née Cottumaccio), Lindsay's sister and Jimmy's ex-girlfriend.
- Todd Robert Anderson as Vernon Barbara, Lindsay's brother-in-law and Becca's immature husband. Vernon is an orthopedic surgeon who "performs hip replacements for old ladies".
- Allan McLeod as Paul Jillian, Lindsay's independently wealthy ex-husband. Officially, Paul works for a bank as "Executive Vice President of Wealth Management", but he seems to have no duties to take up his time.
- Shane Francis Smith as Killian Mounce, Jimmy and Edgar's pre-teen neighbor.
- Brandon Mychal Smith as Sam Dresden, Gretchen's main client. Sam leads a rap trio and projects a "street" image, but his tastes run to Craft Movement furniture and fittings.
- Darrell Britt-Gibson as Shitstain, a member of Sam's rap trio and his friend. His real name is Dale.
- Colin Campbell as "Barfly", often seen drinking when the action takes place in a bar.
- Giovonnie Samuels as Brianna (season 1), Gretchen's assistant at the PR agency.
- Stephen Schneider as Ty Wyland (season 1–2, 4), a movie director who was Gretchen's lover before she met Jimmy, and who occasionally attempts to re-insert himself in her life, to Jimmy's dismay.
- Allen Maldonado as Honeynutz (season 1–3), another friend of Sam and a member of his rap trio. His real name is Zachary. In season 4, it is revealed that Honeynutz is 45 years old, which causes Sam and Shitstain to dismiss him from the trio.
- Steve Agee as Dutch (seasons 1–5), a character who misinterprets a chance remark as an invitation to abandon his current job and begin a new venture.
- Mageina Tovah as Amy Cadingle (season 2), Paul's friend.
- Tessa Ferrer as Nina Keune (season 2), former champion skier and owner of Jimmy's favorite bar.
- Collette Wolfe as Dorothy Durwood (season 2–3), a member of Edgar's improv comedy troupe.
- Kathleen Rose Perkins as Priscilla (seasons 3–4), a stylist who hires Lindsay as her assistant.
- Doug Benson as himself (seasons 3–5); Edgar begins working for him as a sketch writer.
- Samira Wiley as Justina Jordan (season 3 and 5), Gretchen's therapist.
- Colin Ferguson as Boone (season 4), friend of Ty's who also befriends Gretchen.
- Anne Dudek as Whitney, Boone's ex-wife. (season 4)
- Brendan Jennings as Neil (season 4), Whitney's current husband, who is bullied mercilessly by Boone.
- Johnny Pemberton as Max (season 4), a fellow sketch writer for Doug Benson and Edgar's new work friend.
- Phil Abrams as Steeb Corniglia, the pretentious host of the in-show Wait Wait...Don't Tell Me! parody Tip of My Tongue (season 1 and 4).
- JoNell Kennedy as Yvette (season 5), Gretchen's boss.
- Brandon Black as Honeynutz 2 (season 5), replacing Maldonado in the trio.
- Lou Taylor Pucci as Nock Nock (season 5), a rapper

=== Notable guest stars ===
- Thomas Middleditch as "Hipster Ringleader", a man who becomes Edgar's rival during Sunday Funday (seasons 1 and 5)
- Marc Evan Jackson as Vernon and Becca Barbara's therapist who recommends that they cut out the toxic people in their life and also rap trio's therapist in the second season (seasons 1 and 2)
- Sandra Bernhard as herself (season 1)
- Henry Rollins as himself (season 2)
- Erik Griffin as Trace, a radio host who has Sam and the other rappers hash out their feud on-air. (season 2)
- Justin Kirk as Rob (season 2)
- Tara Summers as Lexi (season 2)
- Ben Folds as himself (seasons 3–5)
- Brian Posehn as himself (season 3)
- Raymond J. Barry as Burt, a resident of a trailer park retirement community (season 4)
- Dee Wallace as Gail, Burt's neighbor at the retirement community (season 4)
- Merrin Dungey as Candace, Jimmy's new publishing rep (season 4)
- Zosia Mamet as Heidi, Gretchen's friend from middle school. (season 4)
- Robin Riker as Faye Cottumaccio, an actress, Lindsay and Becca's mother (season 4)
- Lou Diamond Phillips as himself, who fictitiously is one of Faye's former lovers (season 4)
- Lucy Montgomery as Katherine, one of Jimmy's former classmates from England (season 4)
- Amy Pietz as Adrienne, an erotica author whom Jimmy encounters at a book expo (season 4)
- Andy Daly as himself (season 4)
- Paul F. Tompkins as himself (season 5)

== Production ==
Production on the pilot for You're the Worst, written by Stephen Falk, was first announced on July 17, 2013. It was announced that casting was completed on September 19, 2013. The network announced that it had ordered the pilot to series on January 24, 2014, ordering an additional nine episodes for the first season. On December 2, 2015, the show was renewed for a third season, which premiered on August 31, 2016.

Most scenes are shot on-location. The house representing Jimmy's home is in Silver Lake, Los Angeles. For season 3, a replica of the interior of the house was constructed on a sound stage, slightly enlarged to improve camera access.

== Episodes ==
Season	Episodes	Originally released		
Season	Episodes	First released	Last released	Network
1	10	July 17, 2014	September 18, 2014	FX
2	13	September 9, 2015	December 9, 2015	FXX
3	13	August 31, 2016	November 16, 2016	FXX
4	13	September 6, 2017	November 15, 2017	FXX
5	13	January 9, 2019	April 3, 2019	FXX

== Reception ==
You're the Worst received praise for its depiction of mental illness and depression.

=== Season 1 ===
On Metacritic, season one has a score of 65 out of 100, based on 20 critics, indicating "generally favorable reviews". It also ranked 14th on critics' favorite TV shows of 2014. Rotten Tomatoes gave the show a critic rating of 82% based on 34 reviews, with an average rating of 7.3/10. The site's consensus reads, "You're the Worst uses clever writing – and its stars' palpable chemistry – to balance comedic elements against its realistically pessimistic tone." The A.V. Club listed You're the Worst as one of the ten best shows of the year.

Vanity Fair named it one of best shows of 2014 and called the show "The perfect love story of our time". David Wiegand of the San Francisco Chronicle called it the best sitcom of 2014.

=== Season 2 ===
The second season received a Metacritic score of 82 out of 100, based on 14 critics, indicating "universal acclaim". Rotten Tomatoes reported a 97% approval rating, based on 33 reviews, with an average rating of 8.5/10. The site's critical consensus reads, "Expertly balancing character growth against edgy humor, season two of You're the Worst elevates the show's excellent writing and talented cast to a new level."

=== Season 3 ===
The third season received a Metacritic score of 85 out of 100, based on 14 critics, indicating "universal acclaim". Rotten Tomatoes reported a 100% approval rating, based on 29 reviews, with an average rating of 8.4/10. The site's critical consensus reads, "You're the Worst continues to chart serious territory with intelligence, heart, and noxious wit in its third season, even as the anti-rom-com's damaged narcissist protagonists slowly start to get over themselves."

=== Season 4 ===
The fourth season received very positive reviews from critics. On Metacritic, it has a score of 84 out of 100 based on 5 reviews, indicating "universal acclaim". Rotten Tomatoes reported a 100% approval rating, based on 15 reviews, with an average rating of 8.5/10. The site's critical consensus reads, "You're the Worst remains smartly idiosyncratic in its fourth season, deftly balancing its dramatic elements against some of the sharpest laughs on television."

=== Season 5 ===
The fifth season received very positive reviews from critics. On Metacritic, it has a score of 86 out of 100 based on 5 reviews, indicating "universal acclaim". Rotten Tomatoes reported a 100% approval rating, based on 13 reviews, with an average rating of 8.3/10. The site's critical consensus reads, "Endearingly acerbic, You're the Worst refuses to overstay its welcome, delivering its fifth and final season with plenty of on brand care and cringe."

The series finale in particular received widespread critical acclaim. Ben Travers from IndieWire gave the episode an "A" rating, praising not only the episode's particularities on satirizing romantic comedies whilst being one, but this specific characteristic throughout the series as a whole. Travers considered that series creator Stephen Falk managed to present a satisfying end for its non-standard characters, and commented that "this ending cements their [Gretchen and Jimmy] status as revolutionaries and outliers, while setting them up as torchbearers for anyone who finds themselves in a similar mindset". Vikram Murthi from The A.V. Club also gave the episode an "A" rating, praising the character development and the topics covered through the series, such as contemporary relationships and living with clinical depression, and how it culminates on the series finale and in the characters choices regarding how to deal with it. Murthi stated that "in the end, they [the characters] take charge of their lives by choosing not just each other, but also the people who surround them. Given that every day is a struggle, it's best to share it with people who understand you than those who don't".

=== Accolades ===
At the 5th Critics' Choice Television Awards, it was nominated for Best Comedy Series. At the 6th Critics' Choice Television Awards, it was nominated again for Best Comedy Series, Aya Cash was nominated for Best Actress in a Comedy Series and Kether Donohue was nominated for Best Supporting Actress in a Comedy Series. At the 32nd TCA Awards, the series was nominated for Outstanding Achievement in Comedy and Aya Cash was nominated for Individual Achievement in Comedy.
