= Jordan Harrison =

Jordan Harrison may refer to:

- Jordan Harrison (basketball) (born 2004), American basketball player
- Jordan Harrison (playwright) (born 1977), American playwright
- Jordan Harrison (soccer) (born 2002), Saudi-Australian soccer player
