= Stephen Falk =

American screenwriter and producer

- Born: April 25, 1972 (age 53); United States
- Occupations: Screenwriter, television producer
- Spouse: Pamela Ribon (m. 2005; div. 2009)

Stephen Falk (born April 25, 1972) is an American screenwriter and producer best known as the creator, executive producer, and showrunner of the FXX series You're the Worst. Falk served as co-executive producer of Netflix’s Orange Is the New Black, and Showtime’s Weeds as well.

In 2012, Falk received a Writers Guild of America award nomination for episodic comedy for an episode of Weeds called "Object Impermanence", and a second in 2014 for his work on Orange Is the New Black. Falk does a weekly webshow about movies with his group The Film Pigs, and has a long-running live storytelling show at The Virgil in Los Angeles called Public School.

As of September 2019, Falk has been developing the fantasy novel Spoonbenders to pilot for Showtime.
