= Yvonne Parker =

Antagonist in Orange is the New Black (2014)

Yvonne "Vee" Parker
- Orange Is the New Black character
- Vee as portrayed by Lorraine Toussaint
- First appearance: "Looks Blue, Tastes Red" (2014)
- Last appearance: "We Have Manners. We're Polite." (2014)
- Portrayed by: Lorraine Toussaint

In-universe information
- Occupation: Drug dealer Prison matriarch
- Family: Tasha "Taystee" Jefferson (adoptive daughter); RJ (adoptive son)

Yvonne "Vee" Parker is a character in the Netflix series Orange Is the New Black, played by Lorraine Toussaint. The central antagonist of the second season, Vee is shown to exhibit sociopathic traits, being skilled at manipulation and emotional mimicry. Upon being incarcerated and returning to Litchfield Penitentiary, she works to further promote the race-based tribalistic system of the prison by uniting most of the black women into a gang under her leadership, maintaining power through coercive tactics and physical intimidation inflicted onto the other inmates. Vee is also highly intelligent and resourceful, successfully creating a black market for cigarettes and drugs without being caught by the guards of the penitentiary.

The character of Vee was well received by audiences, being praised as an effective villain for the second season. For her critically-acclaimed performance, Toussaint was nominated for multiple awards in both the comedy and drama categories.

== Casting and background ==
Lorraine Toussaint was cast as Vee by the director of the series, Jenji Kohan. Upon hearing from her manager that the cast of Orange Is the New Black had an open position, Toussaint's manager "put [her] on tape and [...] sent it off to New York. They responded very quickly, and liked it." Toussaint did not meet Kohan until the first day on set, and was unaware of Vee's extreme amorality until being informed by her.

Throughout the series, Vee appears to be a complex sociopath that uses emotional mimicry to gain followers, but is simultaneously unafraid to throw others under the bus to maintain control and avoid punishment. Kohan described the character as "clinically psychotic". Before her time in prison, she ran a drug smuggling ring, bringing children off the streets to assist her, and bribed local police to overlook her operation. While she takes in children who are unadopted and raises them herself, she will turn against them if they anger her. Toussaint commented on Vee's perceived motherhood; "[s]he has a capacity to eat her young. But she's [sic] see herself as a mother nonetheless." One reviewer observed "[f]rom the start of Season Two it was clear that Vee had a powerful presence at Litchfield — one that enabled her to control prisoners and leave her nemesis struggling to overcome her." Through her charisma and deception, Vee was able to gain a following during each of her sentences in Litchfield and extend control over most of the black inmates. While most of Vee's relationships with fellow inmates were one-sided and insincere, Vee's relationship with her former adoptive daughter Tasha "Taystee" Jefferson has been viewed as multifaceted, with both transactional and maternal elements. When asked about the nature of their connection, Toussaint said "Taystee, more than anyone probably in [Vee's] life, has accessed as much heart as she has available to be accessed."

== Storylines ==
=== Season 2 ===
Vee is first seen in a flashback; Taystee, known then by her birth name Tasha, is seen at an adoption festival trying to find a guardian to take her in, and meets Vee. As a result, Tasha is taken in by Vee and at some point begins to deal drugs for the latter.

Vee appears in real time in Litchfield Penitentiary, being incarcerated once again. Taystee is initially unhappy to see Parker and unwilling to reconcile, though Parker warmly embraces with Galina "Red" Reznikov, whom she knew from her prior time in the prison. Noticing that Suzanne Warren is an outsider among her friends and most other inmates, Vee befriends her in order to begin regaining power over the prison. Additionally, Vee tries to convince Poussey Washington to sell her hooch to other inmates for profit, but Poussey refuses.

Having become influential enough among many of the African-American inmates of Litchfield Penitentiary enough to become leader of their group, Vee starts to expand the scope of power of the posse. She has a confrontation with Gloria Mendoza, leader of the Latina posse, feigning fear in order to manipulate Mendoza into accepting a deal. Red, however, recognizes Vee's tactics and becomes increasingly wary of her as a result.

Despite her de facto status as prison matriarch, Poussey refuses to affiliate with Vee's posse, seeing through Vee's charisma. When Vee gets Taystee transferred from her job as librarian in order to assist in Vee's covert cigarette operation, Poussey threatens Vee. Vee, who noticed a kiss between Poussey and Taystee that was not emotionally reciprocated by the latter, shot back that Taystee will never love Poussey, increasing the tension between the two. Vee begins to form a cigarette black market with the help of her posse, who spread word of it and thus increases Vee's influence, convincing Poussey to join her operation and rebuffing Cindy "Black Cindy" Hayes' criticism of her regime.

Vee starts to undermine Red – the other prison matriarch and head of the Caucasian posse – and her perceived alliance with Mendoza. As Red was also running a black market for contraband items, Vee wished to find and utilize Red's source for importing the goods – a secret tunnel in the greenhouse that leads outside of prison grounds –, and threatens Red's family lest she refuses to cooperate. In a further attempt to disempower Red and expand her empire, Vee provides Nicky Nichols, a close friend of Red, with heroin to try and provoke her addiction. Additionally, Vee provides Carrie "Big Boo" Black with cigarettes in exchange for Boo revealing how Red has been bringing in contraband. In a flashback, it is revealed that Red first arrived to Litchfield Penitentiary when Vee was serving one of her prior sentences. Vee befriended Red, and suggested she use her connection to the prison vendor to smuggle in goods, and later shows Vee the fruits of her efforts. Vee, who was the head of the African-American posse at the time, later forcefully acquired the contraband earned by Red and ordered her associates to brutally beat Red up, warning Red that she would end up in maximum security if she reports Vee.

Poussey begins to notice Vee's self-serving tendencies more clearly and argues with Taystee about it. Much to Poussey's chagrin, Vee displays no reaction when Janae Watson is found with Vee's cigarettes and consequently sent to the Security Housing Unit. Subsequently, Poussey attacks Vee out of rage for allowing Janae to be punished. With Vee's approval, Suzanne interferes and beats up a sobbing Poussey. Meanwhile, some of the elder inmates that have loyalty to Red plan to assassinate Vee independent of the former. The murder is carried out by Erica Taslitz, who is seen stabbing a black woman that she mistakenly thought was Vee, who watches, interpreting the murder as an act of war on Red's part.

Marked hostility and tension between the African-American and Caucasian posses ensues, emphasised by both Vee and Red. When Poussey is discovered to have sabotaged Vee's contraband hiding spots, Vee exiles Taystee from her group. In a flashback, it is revealed that along with Taystee, Vee had another adoptive son called RJ; the three lived together as a family for a time. At one point, Vee discovered that RJ was dealing drugs independently of Vee as well, causing her to argue with him, though she ended up seducing him and sleeping with him. Then, Vee utilizes her contacts with the police and orchestrates a policeman to murder RJ under the false pretense that he had a gun.
During a verbal confrontation between Vee and Red, the latter attempts to convince the former that the unintended murder of the woman mistaken for Vee was intentional. Later on, while Vee is busy emptying buckets of toilet water due to the prison flooding, Red jumps Vee, choking her with plastic wrap. Despite initially resisting, Vee concedes defeat, causing Red to release her and the two making a truce. The next day, Vee hits Red over the head with a slock, (Note: An improvised weapon wherein a padlock is placed inside a sock.) revealing that the truce was a sham to let Red's guard down.

Due to Vee's assault of Red, the latter is hospitalized and Special Intelligence Service (SIS) arrives at Litchfield to investigate the incident. Vee gaslights Suzanne into believing that she slocked Red, and convinces the rest of her posse to name Suzanne as the culprit as well. SIS concludes that Suzanne was responsible, but prison guard Sam Healy believes in Suzanne's innocence and forges a work order that would have placed Suzanne away from the greenhouse where Red was assaulted. Additionally, Black Cindy and Janae turn against Vee and revise their statement to incriminate Vee. Having no supporters left and sensing her impending doom, Vee denounces her former followers and uses Red's greenhouse tunnel to escape the prison. After a while, Vee reaches the roadside, presumably hoping to hitch-hike. Miss Rosa, another inmate at Litchfield Penitentiary, happened to have escaped in one of the prison's vans at the same time. Remembering that Vee forced Rosa out of her seat in the cafeteria previously, Rosa intentionally veers off the road and runs into Vee, killing her.

=== Season 3 ===
In the aftermath of Vee's death, Suzanne struggles to accept reality due to having felt a close bond to Vee despite her actions. Suzanne later apologizes to Poussey for having assaulted her under Vee's command.

=== Season 7 ===
Though she does not appear nor is she explicitly mentioned, when Badison jokingly says to her gang "that's my Taystee girl," when referring to Taystee – a phrase that Vee coincidentally also used –, Taystee is reminded of her experiences with Vee and proceeds to beat Badison up.

== Reception ==
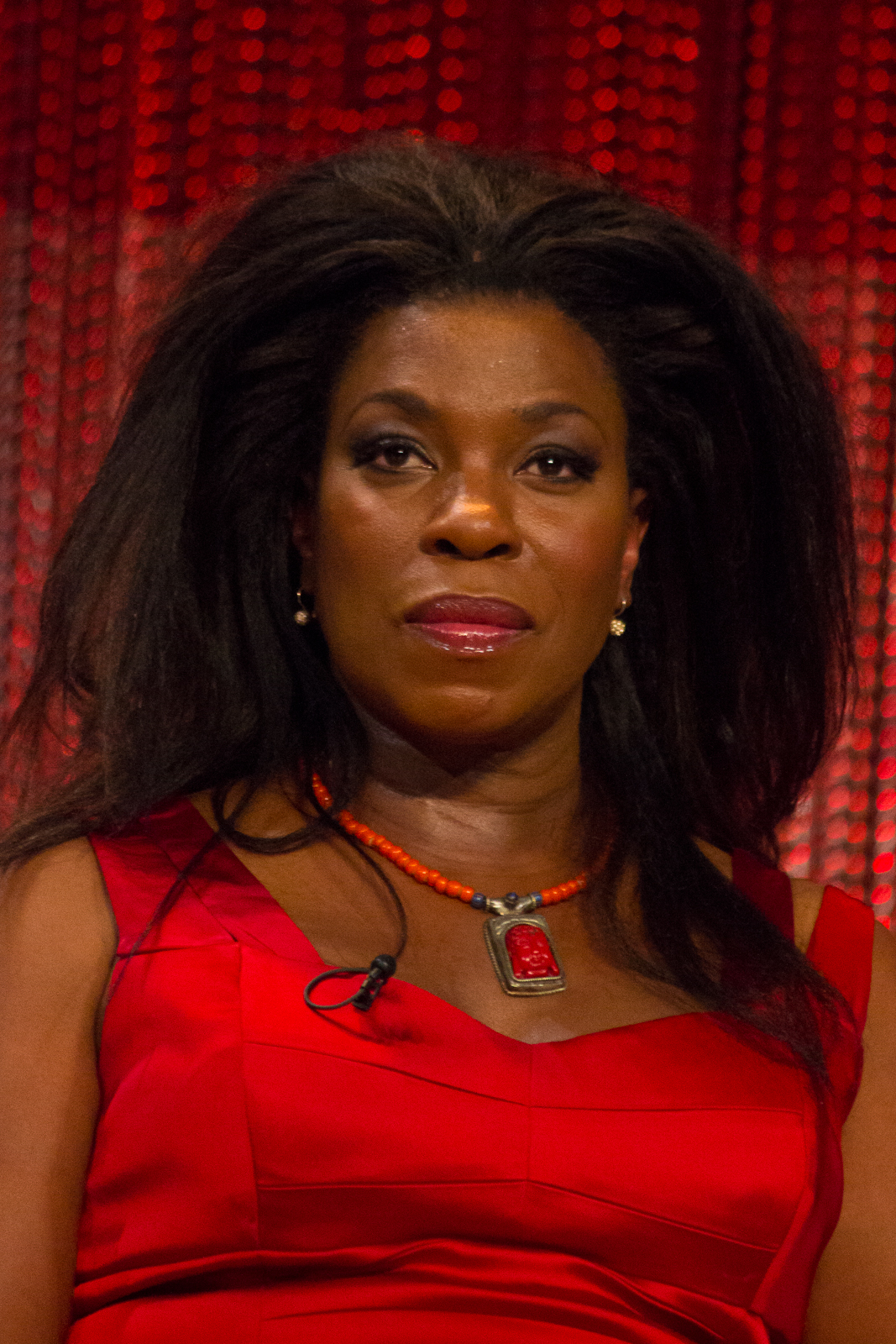
Lorraine Toussaint at Paley Fest

=== Critical commentary ===
The character of Yvonne Parker, more commonly known as "Vee" in the series, received praise as an effective and investing villain for the second season. Daniel Falconer of Screen Rant felt that the character "brought a charisma to her villainous role that has never quite been mirrored by another." The Hollywood Reporter ranked Vee as the best villain in the series, maintaining that she had "the largest impact on Litchfield and its inmates." Tyler Coates of Decider lauded the interesting portrayal of Vee as a scheming villain. In addition, a scene in the 12th episode of the series "It Was the Change," where Vee's upper body is visible after sleeping with RJ, was praised by Coates for its "visual honesty" regarding portrayal of diverse body types of women.

With Vee's apparent death in the season two finale, many fans hoped that the character would make an appearance in season three. Despite this, it was confirmed by Kohan that Vee was dead and would not return in any future episodes.

Toussaint's acting in particular was widely acclaimed. An article on The Daily Beast says, "[Vee is] like the monster under the bed, only I loved [Toussaint's] performance so much that I perversely kept crawling under the bed to visit with the monster." Co-star Yael Stone, who plays Lorna Morello in the show, noted "it was a wonderful thing to watch her work, I think she's really incredible."

=== Awards and nominations ===
Year	Association	Category	Result	Ref.
2014	NewNowNext Award	Best New Television Actress	Nominated	
2014	NAACP Image Award	Outstanding Supporting Actress in a Comedy Series	Nominated	
2014	Screen Actors Guild Award	Outstanding Performance by an Ensemble in a Comedy Series	Won	
2015	Essence Black Women in Hollywood Award	Vanguard Award	Won	
2015	Critics' Choice Television Award	Best Supporting Actress in a Drama Series	Won	
2015	EWwy Awards	Best Supporting Actress in a Drama	Nominated	
