= Orange Is the New Black season 3 =

Orange Is the New Black
- Season 3
- Promotional poster
- Starring: Taylor Schilling; Uzo Aduba; Danielle Brooks; Michael Harney; Selenis Leyva; Natasha Lyonne; Taryn Manning; Adrienne C. Moore; Dascha Polanco; Nick Sandow; Yael Stone; Samira Wiley; Kate Mulgrew; Laura Prepon
- No. of episodes: 13

Release
- Original network: Netflix
- Original release: June 11, 2015

Season chronology
- ← Previous; Season 2 Next → Season 4

The third season of the American comedy-drama television series Orange Is the New Black premiered on Netflix on June 11, 2015, at 12:00 am PST in multiple countries. It consists of thirteen episodes, each between 53–60 minutes, with a 90-minute finale. The series is based on Piper Kerman's memoir, Orange Is the New Black: My Year in a Women's Prison (2010), about her experiences at FCI Danbury, a minimum-security federal prison. The series is created and adapted for television by Jenji Kohan.

The season received critical acclaim, again winning the Screen Actors Guild Award for Outstanding Performance by an Ensemble in a Comedy Series and Outstanding Performance by a Female Actor in a Comedy Series for Uzo Aduba, and numerous other awards.

== Cast and characters ==
=== Main cast ===
- Taylor Schilling as Piper Chapman, inmate
- Uzo Aduba as Suzanne "Crazy Eyes" Warren, inmate
- Danielle Brooks as Tasha "Taystee" Jefferson, inmate
- Michael Harney as Sam Healy, correctional officer
- Selenis Leyva as Gloria Mendoza, inmate
- Natasha Lyonne as Nicky Nichols, inmate
- Taryn Manning as Tiffany "Pennsatucky" Doggett, inmate
- Adrienne C. Moore as Cindy "Black Cindy" Hayes, inmate
- Dascha Polanco as Dayanara "Daya" Diaz, inmate
- Nick Sandow as Joe Caputo, Director of Human Activities, later Warden
- Yael Stone as Lorna Morello, inmate
- Samira Wiley as Poussey Washington, inmate
- Kate Mulgrew as Galina "Red" Reznikov, inmate
- Laura Prepon as Alex Vause, inmate

=== Recurring cast ===
==== Inmates ====
- Jackie Cruz as Marisol "Flaca" Gonzales
- Lea DeLaria as Carrie "Big Boo" Black
- Elizabeth Rodriguez as Aleida Diaz
- Jessica Pimentel as Maria Ruiz
- Laverne Cox as Sophia Burset
- Annie Golden as Norma Romano
- Laura Gómez as Blanca Flores
- Diane Guerrero as Maritza Ramos
- Vicky Jeudy as Janae Watson
- Julie Lake as Angie Rice
- Emma Myles as Leanne Taylor
- Abigail Savage as Gina Murphy
- Constance Shulman as Erica "Yoga" Jones
- Lori Tan Chinn as Mei Chang
- Tamara Torres as Emily Germann
- Lin Tucci as Anita DeMarco
- Beth Fowler as Sister Jane Ingalls
- Barbara Rosenblat as Rosa "Miss Rosa" Cisneros (guest)
- Kimiko Glenn as Brook Soso
- Dale Soules as Frieda Berlin
- Lori Petty as Lolly Whitehill
- Emily Althaus as Maureen Kukudio
- Blair Brown as Judy King
- Ruby Rose as Stella Carlin

==== Staff ====
- Catherine Curtin as Wanda Bell
- Joel Marsh Garland as Scott O'Neill
- Matt Peters as Joel Luschek
- Alysia Reiner as Natalie "Fig" Figueroa
- Brendan Burke as Wade Donaldson
- Lolita Foster as Eliqua Maxwell
- Germar Terrell Gardner as Charles Ford
- Matt McGorry as John Bennett
- Pablo Schreiber as George "Pornstache" Mendez
- Alan Aisenberg as Baxter "Gerber" Bayley
- Beth Dover as Linda Ferguson / "Amelia Von Barlow"
- Jimmy Gary Jr. as Felix Rikerson
- James McMenamin as Charlie "Donuts" Coates
- Mike Birbiglia as Danny Pearson
- Marsha Stephanie Blake as Berdie Rogers

==== Others ====
- Michael Chernus as Cal Chapman
- Tanya Wright as Crystal Burset
- Tracee Chimo as Neri Feldman
- Berto Colon as Cesar
- Deborah Rush as Carol Chapman
- Ian Paola as Yadriel
- John Magaro as Vince Muccio
- Mary Steenburgen as Delia Powell-Mendez

== Episodes ==
No. overall	No. in season	Title	Directed by	Written by	Featured character(s)	Original release date
27	1	"Mother's Day"	Andrew McCarthy	Jenji Kohan	various	June 11, 2015
The prison hosts a special visitation party to celebrate Mother's Day, as part of Caputo's attempt to "soften" his regime in light of recent controversies. Piper finds out that Alex has returned to Litchfield and the two reconcile. Poussey misses her deceased mother. Bennett struggles to deal with Daya's family, while keeping under wraps that he is the father of her child. Daya and Aleida clash on the topic of motherhood. Pennsatucky holds a memorial for the abortions she's had. Sophia bonds with Michael. Healy feels threatened by Caputo's recent staff change decision. Red fills the hole in the greenhouse with cement. She is later visited by her family, from whom she figures out Piper had lied regarding the store's success. Maria gets to see and play with her baby daughter, but at the end of the visit, Yadriel states that the baby will not see Maria anymore. Flashback: Flashbacks reveal several inmates' past Mother's Day experiences with their own mothers.
28	2	"Bed Bugs and Beyond"	Constantine Makris	Jim Danger Gray	Bennett	June 11, 2015
Litchfield prison combats a bed bug infestation. Red confronts Piper about the lies she told regarding Red's family's store, causing Red to cut off Piper for dishonesty before Healy gives her a dressing down. Mendez's mother visits the prison and offers to adopt Daya's baby, causing tension among Bennett, Daya and Aleida. Alex struggles to deal with being back in prison. Piper reveals she ratted Alex out to her parole officer, causing the two to square off. Bennett proposes to Daya but has qualms about her extended family, especially Cesar. Nicky and Boo find that they have been robbed of the heroin they were hiding. Caputo learns that the prison is to close due to budget constraints. Piper and Alex's feud comes to a head in the closed library, where they hook up. Bennett gets a crib from Cesar, but he also witnesses Cesar pointing a gun at one of his children. An overwhelmed Bennett abandons the crib on the side of the road and drives away. Flashback: Bennett was a U.S. Army soldier deployed to Afghanistan, where his unit comes under an insider attack by Afghan forces. When a grenade is thrown into his tent, he is told to kick it away but instead dives for cover, forcing another soldier to take the blast.
29	3	"Empathy Is a Boner Killer"	Michael Trim	Nick Jones	Nicky	June 11, 2015
Luschek finds a buyer for Nicky's heroin, but is furious when Nicky says it has been stolen. Alex and Piper continue to have a contentious relationship. Caputo denies rumors that the prison is shutting down, though the prison staff remains suspicious. Daya is worried over Bennett's disappearance. A new counselor, Berdie Rogers, starts a theater class, where Alex and Piper reconcile during a performance. It is revealed that Nicky had been keeping the heroin for herself, but the drugs are discovered by the meth heads. Luschek initially takes the heroin from them, but when the drugs are found by Caputo, Luschek rats out Nicky. Healy recruits Red to help him talk to his wife. Caputo blackmails Figueroa into helping him keep the prison open, and she points him to a private company that was interested in acquiring it. Nicky is sent to maximum security prison. She laments that even after kicking her drug addiction, she may never lose her self-destructive tendencies. Flashback: Nicky's longtime struggle with her drug habit leads to self-destruction, including stealing a taxi and ruining her relationship with her mother.
30	4	"Finger in the Dyke"	Constantine Makris	Lauren Morelli	Big Boo	June 11, 2015
The inmates deal with the loss of Nicky. Caputo takes the private company, MCC, on a tour of the prison. Suzanne continues to deal with the death of Vee. Daya worries that Bennett has run off on her. Piper has a tense visit with her family on her birthday. She and Alex begin to grow close again. Pennsatucky reveals she is still getting money from the anti-abortion group that considers her a martyr. Big Boo gets a makeover, hoping to convince the religious group to give her funding, but she flies into a rage at the homophobic reverend. Red and Healy develop a friendship with romantic undertones. MCC agrees to take over operations of the prison, saving it from closure. Flashback: Big Boo has a tense relationship with her uptight parents, especially her mother, who does not approve of her being a lesbian. Her mother later dies of an illness.
31	5	"Fake It Till You Fake It Some More"	Nicole Holofcener	Tara Herrmann	Flaca	June 11, 2015
MCC invests in new mattresses and improvements in the prison, but they cut the guards' hours to part time. Daya tries to figure out her next steps without Bennett. Alex is paranoid that Kubra is trying to kill her. Poussey tries to stop animals from stealing her fermented alcohol. A new work detail that pays ten times the wage of other prison jobs is introduced, prompting the inmates to jockey for the new positions. They take a test and several inmates, including Piper and Flaca, are selected. It is revealed they will be working in a shop making women's underwear. Flashback: In high school, Flaca uses psychology to trick students into believing she is selling them LSD. When a classmate who believes he is high jumps from a building, Flaca is arrested for fraud.
32	6	"Ching Chong Chang"	Anthony Hemingway	Sara Hess	Chang	June 11, 2015
Caputo interviews more part-time applicants, to the consternation of the other COs. A new prisoner, Lolly, reveals that a more appetizing kosher meal may be requested from the kitchen. Celebrity chef Judy King is arraigned on tax-evasion charges. As the prisoners begin making the Whispers underwear, Piper flirts with a new prisoner, Stella Carlin. Morello is visited by a series of civilian pen pals looking for romance, and she takes a shine to a Jiu Jitsu enthusiast. Healy cons Caputo into getting Red back into the kitchen. Dreaming of love, a lonely Poussey makes and drinks hooch. Chang secretly prepares specialty foods for herself and watches Chinese movies on a cell phone stashed in a garden shack. Flashback: Chang is savagely rejected by a wealthy Chinese businessman, who had met her for an arranged marriage, but insisted he could never marry such an ugly girl. She later rises and thrives in an underworld Asian crime ring, and exacts violent revenge on the man who rejected her.
33	7	"Tongue-Tied"	Julie Anne Robinson	Sian Heder	Norma	June 11, 2015
Suzanne displays a talent for writing bizarre, erotically charged fantasy stories. Stella agrees to contribute soiled Whispers underwear for Piper's planned dirty-panties business. Piper recruits Cal to assist in the operation. Daya wrestles over who should raise her baby. Commuting to the prison together, Mendoza's son teaches Sophia's son rude behavior, causing the two mothers to clash. The controversy, paired with Ramos nearly slicing her finger off, leads to Red running the kitchen again—just as the new regime introduces "boil in the bag" meals. MCC's failure to properly train the COs leads to a botched pepper-spraying incident. Norma's reputation as a miracle-performing mystic grows. Flashback: Norma became one of many wives of a Svengali-like prophet in her younger years, only to murder him later.
34	8	"Fear, and Other Smells"	Mark A. Burley	Nick Jones	Alex	June 11, 2015
Suzanne's sci-fi story gains a cult following in the prison, but its latest chapter aggravates Poussey's alcoholic depression. The prisoners despise the new cafeteria food, and are angry at the rising prices of commissary items. Piper conscripts fellow inmates to wear panties stolen from the factory; the used panties are then to be sold online for a profit. Berdie objects when Healy prescribes antidepressants to Soso, causing him to angrily pass Soso's case on to her. Pennsatucky bonds with Charlie Coates, a new CO. At a meeting in Utica, executives at MCC are shown to be completely devoid of compassion, and are solely concerned with cost-cutting and profits. Caputo grows to despise Pearson, who proves unsuccessful in pushing through his suggestions about upgrades. Sophia and Mendoza commiserate about not being around to raise their respective sons. When Daya learns from Mendez's mother that Aleida had arranged a financial deal to raise the baby, Daya confesses to her that Mendez is not the child's father. Alex suspects that Lolly may have been sent by Kubra to kill her. Lolly is later seen keeping detailed notebook records of Alex's every move. Flashback: Kubra targets Fahri for having blown an operation.
35	9	"Where My Dreidel At"	Andrew McCarthy	Jordan Harrison	Leanne	June 11, 2015
With the help of Cal and CO Bayley, Piper's used-panties business is a rousing success. Prisoners continue to obsess over Suzanne's comically pornographic serial novel. Red is humiliated over the disgusting cafeteria food. A rabbi quizzes prisoners about their alleged devotion to committed Jewish beliefs, resulting in a short list of approved kosher meals. A nude Stella chats with a visibly impressed Piper in the bathroom, and they later share a kiss. Mendoza and Sophia clash again when Michael is arrested on battery charges; Sophia learns that Mendoza's son fled the scene. Outside of the prison, Coates kisses Pennsatucky. Leanne bullies Soso and acts as the self-appointed vocal leader of Norma's spiritual group. Norma unsuccessfully tries to teach kindness and tolerance to Leanne. After Lolly breaks a window in a shed, Alex notices that a large shard of glass has vanished from the debris. To her horror, Alex discovers Lolly's notebook. Flashback: Leanne breaks free from her Amish roots only to be arrested for possession of meth while attempting to return to her family.
36	10	"A Tittin' and a Hairin'"	Jesse Peretz	Lauren Morelli	Pennsatucky	June 11, 2015
A young inmate, Maureen, begins pursuing Suzanne romantically. Suzanne tells Morello that in spite of her erotically charged novels, she is still a virgin and confused about sex. Judy King is found guilty; the prisoners are disappointed when King's destination is not Litchfield. After observing Stella making moves on Piper, Alex confronts the pair in Piper's bunk. Mendez is visited in prison by his mother, and is told that he is not the father of Daya's child. Mendez's mother informs Daya that she still wishes to raise the baby, and Daya agrees. Morello uses Vince, her pen pal, to exact revenge on Christopher. Leanne and Soso continue to antagonize each other, with Norma caught in the middle. Using veggies grown in the garden, Red prepares a small pan of ratatouille for her kitchen staffers. Enraged that Sophia has cut off her son's ride to the prison, Mendoza picks a fight with her in the bathroom. Alex attacks Lolly, but comes to realize Lolly is not an assassin, just highly paranoid and delusional. Coates is reprimanded for being late after spending time with Pennsatucky. In a rage, Coates rapes Pennsatucky in the prison van. Flashback: A teenaged Pennsatucky swaps unpleasant casual sex for drinks. She meets and falls in love with a new boyfriend who teaches her to enjoy sex. When he moves away, Pennsatucky is raped by a former "customer."
37	11	"We Can Be Heroes"	Phil Abraham	Sian Heder	Caputo	June 11, 2015
Caputo agrees to help the guards unite against their heartless corporate overlords. Due to a computer error, Leanne's sidekick Angie is mistakenly released. Caputo later recaptures her at the bus station. Big Boo learns of Coates' abuse of Pennsatucky and vows to help her get revenge. After injuring Mendoza, Sophia becomes a pariah and her salon empties. Suzanne's manuscript lands on the staff's radar, leading to its confiscation, and Berdie is unfairly put on leave over the scandal. Suzanne appears relieved to be done with the project and apologizes to Poussey for attacking her under Vee's tenure. After Soso confronts Norma for letting her group bully her, Leanne cuts off Soso's hair while she sleeps. Flaca encourages Piper's girls to stop wearing the panties until they get paid real money. Piper agrees to set up a payment plan using cash cards, but she then fires Flaca for instigating the uprising. Repulsed by seeing this side of Piper, Alex quits both the business and their relationship. Flashback: Caputo sacrifices a career as a musician and takes a job as a guard at Litchfield in order to support his girlfriend, who is pregnant with Caputo's former bandmate's child. Later, she leaves Caputo when her child's biological father becomes a successful musician.
38	12	"Don't Make Me Come Back There"	Uta Briesewitz	Sara Hess	Aleida & Daya	June 11, 2015
Daya goes into labor and will not let Aleida help. Red runs an open lottery to determine who will attend her fancy dinner party. Following Berdie's suspension, Soso returns to Healy for counseling, who continues to recommend medication. Boo cajoles Pennsatucky into exacting revenge on Coates, but they back out before doing so. Sophia gets attacked and beaten by two other inmates. When Sophia threatens to sue Litchfield for low security, she is unfairly put in the SHU. Bayley refuses to carry any more panties out of the prison, but Stella convinces him to continue. While Daya is at the hospital, Aleida calls Mendez's mother and falsely tells her that the baby had died. Taystee realizes that she is the new "mother" in her group. Poussey finds Soso unconscious in the library, having overdosed on pills; Soso had stolen the pills from the doctor's office after being given a prescription from Healy. Stella reveals to Piper that she is getting out soon. Flashback: Aleida drops a young Daya off at camp to get rid of her for a few weeks. Daya initially protests, but when Aleida comes to pick her up, Daya has made new friends and has adjusted to her surroundings.
39	13	"Trust No Bitch"	Phil Abraham	Jim Danger Gray & Jenji Kohan	various	June 11, 2015
Poussey, Taystee and Suzanne save Soso from her overdose. Piper confronts Flaca about stealing the proceeds from her panty business, but soon comes to realize that Stella is the culprit, as she will have no money to live on when she gets released. Piper exacts revenge by framing Stella for possession of dangerous contraband, resulting in Stella being dragged off to maximum security. Morello marries Vince, while Cindy shows a newfound sincerity in her attempts to become Jewish. However, converting fully requires a Jewish baptism, which requires a natural body of water. Complications arise concerning Daya's baby after Cesar is arrested. Norma faces losing her followers after Poussey angrily confronts her for Soso's attempted suicide. Caputo, after promising to head up the staff union, accepts a promotion from MCC, causing the staff to walk out. A construction mishap allows all the prisoners to escape to a nearby beach and play in the lake. Soso is taken in by the African-American group; Suzanne bonds with Maureen; Cindy, having unexpected access to the required natural body of water, performs her ritual immersion and officially becomes Jewish. Alex is cornered in the greenhouse by a new guard sent by Kubra, and her fate is left uncertain. As the prisoners frolic in the lake, several busloads of new prisoners arrive at Litchfield. Flashback: Flashbacks reveal several inmates' past experiences involving religion and beliefs.

== Production ==
On May 5, 2014, the series was renewed for a third season. For the third season, several actors were promoted to series regulars, including Selenis Leyva, Adrienne C. Moore, Dascha Polanco, Nick Sandow, Yael Stone, and Samira Wiley. Both Jason Biggs and Pablo Schreiber were confirmed as not returning for the third season, but Schreiber appeared in the 10th episode of the third season.

== Reception ==
=== Critical reception ===
The third season received critical acclaim. On Metacritic, it has a score of 83 out of 100 based on 24 reviews. On Rotten Tomatoes, it has a 96% rating with an average score of 8.2 out of 10 based on 53 reviews. The site's critical consensus reads: "Thanks to its blend of potent comedy and rich character work, Orange is the New Black remains a bittersweet pleasure in its third season."

=== Accolades ===
For its third season, Orange Is the New Black won Screen Actors Guild Awards for Outstanding Performance by an Ensemble in a Comedy Series and Outstanding Performance by a Female Actor in a Comedy Series (Aduba). It received a Golden Globe Award nomination for Best Television Series – Musical or Comedy. The series has also received, among other accolades, six Writers Guild of America Award nominations, five Satellite Awards, four Critics' Choice Television Awards, a GLAAD Media Award, an American Cinema Editors Award, a Producers Guild of America Award, and a Peabody Award.

== Broadcast ==
In Australia, the third season began airing on Showcase on June 11, 2015.
