= Orange Is the New Black season 2 =

Orange Is the New Black
- Season 2
- Promotional poster
- Starring: Taylor Schilling; Uzo Aduba; Danielle Brooks; Michael Harney; Natasha Lyonne; Taryn Manning; Kate Mulgrew; Jason Biggs
- No. of episodes: 13

Release
- Original network: Netflix
- Original release: June 6, 2014

Season chronology
- ← Previous; Season 1 Next → Season 3

The second season of the American comedy-drama television series Orange Is the New Black premiered on Netflix on June 6, 2014, at 12:00 am PST in multiple countries. It consists of thirteen episodes, each between 51 and 60 minutes, with a 90-minute finale. The series is based on Piper Kerman's memoir, Orange Is the New Black: My Year in a Women's Prison (2010), about her experiences at FCI Danbury, a minimum-security federal prison. The series is created and adapted for television by Jenji Kohan.

The series follows Piper Chapman, forced to board a bus and a plane without being given any information. Later she discovers that she is in Chicago to testify in the trial of Alex's drug boss, Kubra Balik, and that the stay is temporary. Meanwhile, in Litchfield Penitentiary, a new inmate is rising to power into the prison, by manipulating other inmates and taking control of the drug contraband. Threatened by this new inmate, Red goes to war, to protect her family and her power.

Orange is the New Black received critical acclaim. The series received numerous accolades including: Producers Guild of America Award for Best Episodic Comedy and Screen Actors Guild Award for Outstanding Performance by an Ensemble in a Comedy Series. Uzo Aduba performance was awarded with the Screen Actors Guild Award for Outstanding Performance by a Female Actor in a Comedy Series and a Primetime Emmy Award for Outstanding Supporting Actress in a Drama Series. The second season was nominated to several Emmys: Outstanding Drama Series, Outstanding Guest Actor in a Drama Series (Pablo Schreiber) and Outstanding Casting for a Drama Series. The series was nominated for the 72nd Golden Globe Awards for Best Television Series – Musical or Comedy, meanwhile Taylor Schilling was nominated for Best Actress – Television Series Musical or Comedy and Uzo Aduba for Best Supporting Actress – Series, Miniseries or Television Film. Lorraine Toussaint won a Best Supporting Actress in a Drama Series.

== Cast and characters ==
=== Main cast ===
- Taylor Schilling as Piper Chapman, inmate
- Uzo Aduba as Suzanne "Crazy Eyes" Warren, inmate
- Danielle Brooks as Tasha "Taystee" Jefferson, inmate
- Michael Harney as Sam Healy, correctional officer
- Natasha Lyonne as Nicky Nichols, inmate
- Taryn Manning as Tiffany "Pennsatucky" Doggett, inmate
- Kate Mulgrew as Galina "Red" Reznikov, inmate
- Jason Biggs as Larry Bloom, Piper's fiancé

=== Recurring cast ===
==== Inmates ====
- Laura Prepon as Alex Vause, inmate
- Selenis Leyva as Gloria Mendoza
- Adrienne C. Moore as Cindy "Black Cindy" Hayes
- Dascha Polanco as Dayanara "Daya" Diaz
- Yael Stone as Lorna Morello
- Samira Wiley as Poussey Washington
- Jackie Cruz as Marisol "Flaca" Gonzales
- Lea DeLaria as Carrie "Big Boo" Black
- Elizabeth Rodriguez as Aleida Diaz
- Jessica Pimentel as Maria Ruiz
- Laverne Cox as Sophia Burset
- Annie Golden as Norma Romano
- Laura Gómez as Blanca Flores
- Diane Guerrero as Maritza Ramos
- Vicky Jeudy as Janae Watson
- Julie Lake as Angie Rice
- Emma Myles as Leanne Taylor
- Abigail Savage as Gina Murphy
- Constance Shulman as Erica "Yoga" Jones
- Lori Tan Chinn as Mei Chang
- Tamara Torres as Emily Germann
- Lin Tucci as Anita DeMarco
- Beth Fowler as Sister Jane Ingalls
- Barbara Rosenblat as Rosa "Miss Rosa" Cisneros
- Kimiko Glenn as Brook Soso
- Dale Soules as Frieda Berlin
- Lori Petty as Lolly Whitehill
- Lorraine Toussaint as Yvonne "Vee" Parker

==== Staff ====
- Nick Sandow as Joe Caputo
- Catherine Curtin as Wanda Bell
- Joel Marsh Garland as Scott O'Neill
- Matt Peters as Joel Luschek
- Alysia Reiner as Natalie "Fig" Figueroa
- Brendan Burke as Wade Donaldson
- Lolita Foster as Eliqua Maxwell
- Germar Terrell Gardner as Charles Ford
- Matt McGorry as John Bennett
- Pablo Schreiber as George "Pornstache" Mendez
- Lauren Lapkus as Susan Fischer

==== Others ====
- Michael Chernus as Cal Chapman
- Tanya Wright as Crystal Burset
- Tracee Chimo as Neri Feldman
- Berto Colon as Cesar
- Deborah Rush as Carol Chapman
- Maria Dizzia as Polly Harper
- Ian Paola as Yadriel

== Episodes ==
No. overall	No. in season	Title	Directed by	Written by	Featured character(s)	Original release date
14	1	"Thirsty Bird"	Jodie Foster	Tara Herrmann & Jenji Kohan	Piper	June 6, 2014
Piper is awakened in solitary and, without being given any information, is forced to board a bus and a plane to Chicago. Though Piper assumes she has been transferred for killing Pennsatucky, Piper reunites with Alex and discovers she is temporarily in Chicago to testify in the trial of Alex's drug boss, Kubra Balik. Alex suggests to Piper they lie in court about knowing Kubra, fearing he will exact revenge if they tell the truth. Piper meets with Larry's father, her lawyer, who strongly advises her to tell the truth. On the way to the trial, Alex pushes one last time for Piper to lie; Piper gives in and perjures herself at the trial. After the trial, Alex informs Piper that she ultimately told the truth. This complicates matters for Piper, who now faces perjury charges and additional time, while Alex is led out of the prison to be released. Flashback: Several flashbacks from Piper's childhood reveal her complicated past.
15	2	"Looks Blue, Tastes Red"	Michael Trim	Jenji Kohan	Taystee	June 6, 2014
Pennsatucky is released from solitary. She makes a deal with Healy about what she will say about the fight, and in exchange, she will get her teeth fixed. Aleida and Gloria compete to solve Daya's constipation problem. Red's commissary funds run short, as she no longer controls the kitchen and cannot aid her outside criminal associates. Red is ultimately taken in by the older Golden Girl inmates. A mock job fair gives Taystee a chance to show off her business smarts with a Philip Morris representative in a mock interview. She gets the mock job after she impresses the rep with her research on the company. At the end of the episode, Taystee's mother figure, Vee, shows up as a new inmate. Flashback: Young Taystee—then referred to as Tasha—goes to a Black Adoption Festival, trying to find a permanent home. She later meets a drug dealer, Vee, who becomes a mother figure to her. Taystee eventually starts working for Vee in the drug trade.
16	3	"Hugs Can Be Deceiving"	Michael Trim	Lauren Morelli	Suzanne	June 6, 2014
Taystee is upset over Vee's return. Vee and Red reunite, having known each other from Vee's previous incarceration. Piper returns to Litchfield along with a talkative inmate named Brook Soso. Larry meets with a journalist who wants to use Piper as a source for a story about fraud and embezzling by the Litchfield administration. Daya becomes frustrated with Bennett when he doesn't know how to smuggle in prenatal vitamins; Bennett realizes he can use his prosthetic leg for smuggling. It is revealed that Suzanne became distraught after the pageant and punched Piper into the snow, making the fight between Piper and Pennsatucky look like they were equally responsible. Vee uses Suzanne's outcast desperation to manipulate her, and she begins her bid to take back power in the prison. Flashback: It is shown that Suzanne was always marked as different, and was pushed by her adoptive mother to show that she is just as worthy and talented as others. At her high-school graduation, she is urged to sing during the ceremony, but stage fright leads to an embarrassing outburst, similar to her non-performance at the Christmas pageant.
17	4	"A Whole Other Hole"	Phil Abraham	Sian Heder	Lorna	June 6, 2014
Nicky and Big Boo engage in a contest to see who can sleep with the most women in jail. Vee offers to help Poussey sell her hooch to other inmates, but Poussey declines; Vee later manipulates Taystee into questioning her friendship with Poussey. In the prison's abandoned greenhouse, Red discovers a secret drain pipe under a set of floorboards, and she starts to grow plants in the greenhouse as a cover to move contraband via the drain pipe. Larry and Polly bond while Pete is away. Morello is devastated upon finding out that her love, Christopher, is marrying another woman. While driving Miss Rosa to cancer treatments, Morello takes the van and breaks into Christopher's home. She dons a wedding veil, takes a relaxing bath, and is nearly caught when Christopher returns home. Flashback: Lorna made money as a scam artist. It is revealed that Christopher was never her fiancé, but a man she stalked after a single date.
18	5	"Low Self Esteem City"	Andrew McCarthy	Nick Jones	Gloria	June 6, 2014
The bathroom that Gloria and her girls use has plumbing problems. Vee is appointed as head of the African-American posse, and they go head-to-head against Gloria's Latinas when they infiltrate the ghetto bathroom. Figueroa refuses to fix the Latina showers due to budget problems, and she limits the shower times to thirty seconds as a solution. Piper is informed by Cal that her grandmother is dying, and she asks Healy for furlough. Boo and Nicky continue their contest over who can score the most points with their sexual conquests; Nicky spends her time trying to bed Fischer, to no avail. As tensions rise between the Black women and the Latinas, Vee and Gloria make a deal in order to calm things down; Red later warns Gloria that Vee has manipulated her. Flashback: Gloria, a victim of domestic violence, is arrested for committing fraud with food stamps traded at the store she ran.
19	6	"You Also Have a Pizza"	Allison Anders	Stephen Falk	Poussey	June 6, 2014
The inmates prepare a Valentine's Day party. Red begins importing items through the sewer drain in the greenhouse. Larry asks Piper to be his prison mole in order to write articles about the prison's finances, leading Piper to question the prisoners and guards about the prison's budget money. When Healy becomes suspicious over her intentions, Piper claims she is starting a prison newspaper. At the Valentine's Day party, Pennsatucky is outlawed from her former group of friends. Clearly upset, Pennsatucky embraces Healy outside the prison. Poussey refuses to affiliate with Vee, who convinces Taystee to transfer from her librarian job to assist in her covert cigarette operation. Larry and Polly share a kiss. Caputo invites Fischer, whom he is infatuated with, to see his band performing at a local bar. Fischer invites the other COs, to Caputo's dismay. During his performance, Caputo notices that Jimmy, an elderly inmate suffering from dementia, has escaped from the prison and is sitting in the bar listening to the music. Flashback: Poussey has a relationship with a German girl while living on an army base in Germany. When the girl's father discovers the two making love, he uses his power to send Poussey's family back to the United States. Poussey confronts her girlfriend's father, ready to pull out a gun on him, but her own father intervenes before the gun is revealed.
20	7	"Comic Sans"	Andrew McCarthy	Sara Hess	Cindy	June 6, 2014
Due to Jimmy's escape, Caputo demands that the COs start monitoring the inmates more closely, and he imposes a minimum quota for shots written. Vee's girls continue to exchange cigarettes for contraband; Taystee gives Nicky a cigarette in exchange for postage stamps for Vee, while Red smuggles in styling products for Sophia in exchange for maintaining her hair color. Poussey refuses to involve herself in Vee's business, though Nicky encourages her to get on Vee's good side. The Spanish girls continue to request contraband from Bennett. Sick of being taken advantage of, Bennett threatens them with shots. Daya, Flaca, and Morello help contribute to Piper's prison newspaper. Polly and Larry have sex. When Jimmy is given compassionate release from the prison, Piper is horrified to learn that she is to be taken to the bus station and left there. Flashback: Black Cindy works as an airport security guard. Regularly searching through people's bags, Cindy steals an iPad for her sister's birthday. Her "sister" is later revealed to be her biological daughter.
21	8	"Appropriately Sized Pots"	Daisy von Scherler Mayer	Alex Regnery & Hartley Voss	Rosa	June 6, 2014
Figueroa pressures Caputo over the prison's increased contraband. Caputo starts to distrust Red's greenhouse, but Red has moved all her contraband to Gloria's kitchen before Caputo can make a search. Piper faces a backlash from the other inmates when she is granted furlough. She later calls her mother to tell her about the furlough, only to find that her grandmother had died a day before. Soso is forced to take a shower by the guards. Healy informs Rosa that officials at the Department of Corrections are unwilling to fund her life-saving operation. Rosa later bonds with a young boy in chemo whom she later learns is in remission. Caputo feels pressure to toughen up, and he immediately fires Fischer when she stands up to Caputo over his rules. Following Fischer's termination, Figueroa rehires Mendez to work at Litchfield. Flashback: In the 1970s, Rosa helps with her first ever bank robbery and quickly becomes the leader of the gang.
22	9	"40 Oz. of Furlough"	S. J. Clarkson	Lauren Morelli	Red & Vee	June 6, 2014
Temporarily released from the prison for 48 hours, Piper reunites with Larry and her family. She tries to initiate a sexual encounter with Larry, but he admits that he slept with somebody else, forcing Piper to realize that they are not right for each other anymore. Piper attends her grandmother's funeral, which unexpectedly turns into Cal and Neri's wedding. At Red's request, Piper visits Red's deli, only to find it has permanently closed. Red's efforts to redeem herself in the eyes of her former posse are finally rewarded, and she intends to usurp her kitchen smuggling enterprise through her gardening club. However, Big Boo tries to integrate herself with Vee by informing her about Red's tunnel. Bennett is upset over Mendez's reappearance, and he angrily tears apart the black ghetto after finding a cigarette. After being put on suspension, Bennett informs Caputo that Daya is pregnant, and suggests that Mendez is the father. Flashback: The history of Red and Vee's relationship at Litchfield is explored. It is revealed that Vee had taken control of the black inmates and Red's kitchen, ending with Vee's posse brutally beating Red.
23	10	"Little Mustachioed Shit"	Jennifer Getzinger	Sian Heder	Piper & Alex	June 6, 2014
Piper returns to prison after furlough, while Bennett returns after his suspension. Piper lies to Red about the condition of her family's deli. The guards get tougher in a bid to turn up prison contraband, but they do not discover where the contraband is coming from. Piper realizes that Larry and Polly slept together, and she gets Neri's help to exact revenge against Polly. Christopher visits Morello and angrily confronts her for breaking into his house. Vee attempts to join Red's business in the garden. Poussey is angered when Vee begins selling heroin to the other inmates, and she drunkenly insults Vee; Suzanne beats Poussey up in a fit of rage. Nicky decides to bring Red the heroin Taystee gave her. Healy starts a therapy group, Safe Place, but nobody shows up. After Daya's pregnancy is revealed, Mendez is fired and arrested, as he is believed to be the father. Mendez is elated over the pregnancy and proclaims his love for Daya as he is escorted out by officers. Flashback: More history of Alex and Piper's relationship is explored.
24	11	"Take a Break from Your Values"	Constantine Makris	Nick Jones	Sister Ingalls	June 6, 2014
Piper finally contacts a paranoid Alex, who reveals that Kubra wasn't convicted. Polly leaves Pete for Larry. Poussey attends Healy's Safe Place group but fails to open up. Red discovers that Big Boo was the one who informed Vee about the tunnel and cuts her out of her family. Upon discovering that Red plans to shut down the greenhouse, the elders form a plan to kill Vee, though they don't inform Red about their plan. The plan backfires when they stab the wrong inmate, which Vee witnesses. Soso protests the prison's conditions through a hunger strike that attracts new support from other inmates. When Piper puts Soso's hunger strike in the prison newspaper, Figueroa furiously shuts down the newspaper operation. Healy later informs Piper that she is being transferred to Virginia within a week. Furious from Jimmy's compassionate release, Sister Ingalls joins Soso's hunger strike to speak out about Litchfield's treatment of older inmates. When Sister Ingalls faints out of starvation, Caputo forces her into medical, where she is force fed by the doctors. Flashback: Flashbacks depict Sister Ingalls joining her first rally and continuing in social activism until she is excommunicated by the church.
25	12	"It Was the Change"	Phil Abraham	Sara Hess	Vee	June 6, 2014
Vee and Red's rivalry continues with several confrontations regarding their competing business ventures. Poussey destroys Vee's entire supply of tobacco, after which Vee ejects Taystee from the group. Taystee initially confronts Poussey, but the two tearfully make up. When a storm floods the plumbing system, the inmates are forced to sleep in the mess hall. Red and her gang are concerned about being attacked during the night; Vee also warns her posse about Red. Rosa confides to Morello about dying in prison. Pennsatucky becomes close to Big Boo in an attempt to uncover details about their "gay agenda". Figueroa discovers that her husband is pursuing an affair with another man. Piper escapes the mess hall to find evidence of Figueroa's fraud in her office, but she is caught by Caputo. Red attempts to strangle Vee while they are alone outside, but she fails. The two agree that Litchfield has changed them, and they shake hands on a truce. When Red enters the greenhouse the next morning, she is suddenly slocked from behind by Vee and severely injured. Flashback: Flashbacks depict Vee's relationship with Taystee, the police, and her foster son before she went to prison.
26	13	"We Have Manners. We're Polite."	Constantine Makris	Jenji Kohan	none	June 6, 2014
Caputo comes to Piper for more details on Fig's fraud; Piper promises to help, but only if he stops her transfer. Figueroa ultimately resigns after Caputo reports her fraud to the warden. Bennett confesses that he impregnated Daya to Caputo, who suppresses the confession in order to avoid a scandal. When an investigation begins over Red's assault, Vee threatens her posse into framing Suzanne for the incident. Healy gets Luschek to sign a fake work order to exonerate Suzanne and turn the focus of the investigation back on Vee. Alex informs Piper about her plans to skip town, as Kubra is hunting her down. In an attempt to get Alex sent back to Litchfield, Piper asks Larry and Polly to inform Alex's parole officer about Alex breaking parole. Vee's family breaks apart and turns on her. Alone and friendless, Vee escapes from prison through the drain pipe. Rosa is told by her doctor that she only has a few weeks left to live. As the prison goes into lockdown over Vee's disappearance, Morello purposely leaves the keys in the van with Rosa, who takes the vehicle and flees the prison in order to taste freedom in the last few weeks of her life. Rosa spies Vee by the side of the road and intentionally runs her down with the van.

== Production ==
On June 27, 2013, prior to the series premiere, Netflix renewed the show for a second season consisting of 13 episodes. Jenji Kohan stated that the story for the second season would focus less on Piper Chapman and more in the cast as a whole. For the second season, Uzo Aduba, Taryn Manning, Danielle Brooks, and Natasha Lyonne were promoted to series regulars. Laura Prepon did not return as a series regular for a second season because of scheduling conflicts. In July, it was announced that Lorraine Toussaint had joined the cast in a recurring role. Toussaint said of the role: "Jenji has written one of the more complex characters I've ever played, and probably one of the more difficult characters I've played. I think it'll be interesting seeing how this character is received, because Jenji has written a character that plays and enjoys the game, and is incredibly engaging and draws people into her, into the big game and has, I have a great deal of fun." It was revealed that Lori Petty would have a guest role. In February 2014, Netflix revealed that the season was to be released on June 6, 2014.

== Reception ==
=== Critical reception ===
The second season received critical acclaim, many praising Toussaint's performance as Vee. Rotten Tomatoes gave a rating of 98%, with an average rating of 9.1 out of 10 based on 42 reviews. The site's critical consensus reads: "With a talented ensemble cast bringing life to a fresh round of serial drama, Orange Is the New Black's sophomore season lives up to its predecessor's standard for female-led television excellence. Metacritic gave the second season a score of 89 out of 100 based on 31 critics, indicating "universal acclaim". David Wiegland of the San Francisco Chronicle gave the season a positive review, calling the first six episodes "not only as great as the first season, but arguably better."

=== Critics' top ten lists ===
Orange Is the New Black was considered one of the best shows of the year by many critics and journalists.

- 2nd – The Star-Ledger
- 3rd – Akron Beacon Journal
- 3rd – HitFix (Dan Fienberg)
- 3rd – Indiewire'
- 3rd – Las Vegas Weekly
- 3rd – Pittsburgh Post-Gazette
- 3rd – Tampa Bay Times
- 3rd – Village Voice
- 4th – Paste
- 4th – PopMatters
- 4th – Time
- 4th – Us Weekly
- 5th – Denver Post
- 5th – Uncle Barky
- 6th – The Daily Beast
- 6th – HitFix (Alan Sepinwall)
- 6th – NPR
- 6th – Sioux City Journal
- 7th – The Hollywood Reporter
- 7th – San Jose Mercury News
- 7th – Vox
- 8th – Slate
- 8th – Thompson on Hollywood!
- 9th – Digital Spy
- 10th – Washington Post
- – Huffington Post
- – Philadelphia Daily News
- – ScreenCrush

== Broadcast ==
In Australia, the second season began airing on Showcase on July 16, 2014.
