= Miss Rosa =

Fictional character in Orange is the New Black

- Orange Is the New Black character
- Barbara Rosenblat as Miss Rosa
- First appearance: "I Wasn't Ready" (2013)
- Last appearance: "We Can Be Heroes" (2015)
- Portrayed by: Barbara Rosenblat; Stephanie Andujar (young)

In-universe information
- Aliases: Rosa Cisneros; Young Rosa
- Significant others: Marco; Andy

Rosa "Miss Rosa" Cisneros is a fictional character from the Netflix dramedy series Orange Is the New Black, played by Barbara Rosenblat. The character made her first screen appearance during the premiere episode titled "I Wasn't Ready", which aired on July 11, 2013. Stephanie Andujar portrayed "Young Rosa" in flashback sequences. Rosenblat originally auditioned for another character but producers asked her to portray Miss Rosa. The character is a cancer sufferer who is incarcerated in Litchfield federal prison because she committed armed bank robberies. Rosenblat did not want to shave her head for the role and a make-up artist was hired to fit a prosthetic appliance to her head creating the character's baldness. The application process took three hours, meaning that the actress had to arrive on set earlier than other cast members. Initially there was no character biography created for Miss Rosa; it was Rosenblat who gave the character a Hispanic background and accent.

The show decided to increase Miss Rosa's role during the second season; creating a backstory episode in which she was revealed to be a daring bank robber surrounded by tragedy. Other storylines include forming friendships with Lorna Morello (Yael Stone) and Yusef (Ben Konigsberg), growing animosity with the show's villain Yvonne "Vee" Parker (Lorraine Toussaint). The show remained focused on developing Miss Rosa's cancer storyline and her illness progressed to terminal stages. She was used to close the second season finale where she is told she has weeks to live. She escapes Litchfield in a stolen prison van and murders Vee with it. In the first episode of the third season, it is revealed that Miss Rosa dies by suicide by driving the van into a quarry.

Critical reception of the character has generally been positive. Various critics praised the character for being the second season's break out role. Jayme Deerwester from USA Today called for Rosenblat to be handed an Emmy Award, while Arielle Calderon of BuzzFeed and Elizabeth Freda from E! Online labelled her as one of the show's best characters. However, Kate Zernike from The New York Times criticized the character's fake accent and Vogue magazine's John Powers thought that she had a "clumsy" backstory.

== Development ==
=== Creation and casting ===
The character was created for the pilot episode of the show. At the time the character did not have a surname and there was no characterization. Barbara Rosenblat attended auditions for Orange Is the New Black in New York. She originally read for the part of Galina "Red" Reznikov which was later awarded to Kate Mulgrew. Later she was asked to play Miss Rosa after she impressed the casting director. Rosenblat asked her agent for more details about the character but the only information supplied was that Miss Rosa has an unknown form of cancer. Little was known because only the first episode had been planned. Alongside dialogue acquired from the audition, the actress had the creative freedom to develop Miss Rosa's image and persona.

=== Characterization ===
Miss Rosa has a unique Hispanic accent which Rosenblat created and puts on. She drew inspiration from her scripts and costume. When she first placed a wig cap and looked in the mirror she began to envision how her character should sound. Though it was not until she filmed later episodes that she made a decision. Rosenblat told Anna Silman from Vulture that it was a scene involving Miss Rosa and Piper Chapman (Taylor Schilling), in which she states "I could have been the jefa". Rosenblat said that the Spanish word made her realize that her character is Hispanic and her dialect is indicative of something Latin.

Miss Rosa is a complex character and as she is developed she became more humanized. Though suffering from cancer, she does not let this define her or limit what she can do. Rosenblat said that she styled Miss Rosa to be a self-absorbed woman who had spent a long time incarcerated in Litchfield prison. The actress also wanted to play her as "classy and centered".

=== Cancer ===
"Characters with cancer wander onto and off of sets of various shows flattened out as either tragic victims or heroic overcomers without much characterization. Both are really two lazy sides of the same generic coin. [...] They are rarely characters unto themselves. With one of Miss Rosa's first lines, "Thank god I got cancer. No one fucks with cancer," it was clear early on that Miss Rosa was going to be an exception."

— A Huffington Post feature on Miss Rosa's cancer. (2014)

Miss Rosa has cancer but refuses to let her illness define her. Rosenblat believed that her character's attitude resonated with viewers and she received letters of thanks from the audience and later recalled that one such letter, from a 16-year-old viewer, meant a lot to her. Her storyline helped him understand elements of his grandmother's cancer he could not grasp. Rosenblat said that these such stories relating to Miss Rosa left her "touched and moved".

Miss Rosa undertakes chemotherapy to treat her cancer, which leaves her bald. Rosenblat did not shave her head for the role because she worried about other roles. She had to wear a silicone "appliance" on her head and neck. Each morning on set makeup artist Josh Turri made up the appliance onto her. The process would take approximately three hours and Turri added false beauty marks, eyebrows and small veins to complete Miss Rosa's look. Rosenblat described him as "utterly brilliant and a perfectionist ... so you got this entirely organic sense that I was utterly bald and suffering [from] cancer." While on set fellow actors and crew members incorrectly assumed she had shaved her head. The weather during filming also affected Miss Rosa's costumer. During warm weather crew shielded Rosenblat from the sun with umbrellas because the heat would cause the make up to crack. Other breaches were caused by perspiration and Turri would drain water from underneath the prosthetics prior to repairing it. At the end of each shoot it took Rosenblat 45 minutes to remove the appliance.

Rosenblat also recalled that while filming an episode directed by Jodie Foster, she plucked her nipple hair. Foster was on set to talk over the logistics of how she wanted it portrayed through Miss Rosa. During season two Miss Rosa needs life-saving surgery, but inmate counselor Sam Healy (Michael J. Harney) informs her that officials at the Department of Corrections are not willing to fund the operation. Instead she is forced to continue with chemotherapy, which for her is essentially a death sentence.

=== Character expansion ===
Miss Rosa played a minor role throughout the first season. Rosenblat had admitted that she only appeared sporadically and did not get to portray much. But the actress was eager to return for the show's second season. But during the second season the role was expanded which surprised Rosenblat. The actress told a reporter from Indiewire, "I learned where Miss Rosa is from I learned why she's in prison. You're going to learn a lot about her, a lot that I was desperate to know, and it helps." In March 2014, series creator Jenji Kohan told Jessie Katz of The Hollywood Reporter that viewers would be introduced to Miss Rosa's backstory. When the writers had planned a backstory episode for the character, Rosenblat was delighted. But the development left her unsure how Miss Rosa's story would fit into main storyline of Orange Is the New Black.

The episode "Appropriately Sized Pots" features a young Rosa. She is involved with a gang who commit bank robberies. It soon transpires that each time Rosa participates in a robbery, someone close to her dies. During her first heist, her boyfriend Marco (Alfredo De Quesada) is shot and killed by a security guard. In a later robbery her new lover Andy (Andhy Méndez) suffers a heart attack. Left with the only other gang member Don (Edvin Ortega), Rosa continues her crime spree. But she becomes obsessed with the thrill of money and raids a bank she did not check out and is apprehended for her crimes. Actress Stephanie Andujar played the character during flashback scenes. She watched Rosenblat's performance of the character so that she could portray her similarly.

During the season Miss Rosa has several encounters with Season 2's main antagonist, Yvonne "Vee" Parker (Lorraine Toussaint). Rosenblat told Taylor Cole Miller of HuffPost that she recalled thinking that the storyline would not have a happy ending and felt that there was a bigger story to come from it. Another storyline sees the character undergoing chemotherapy sessions at a hospital. Rosenblat told radio host Ira Wood that Miss Rosa meets a cancer stricken teenager Yusef (Ben Konigsberg) who thinks she is an "old git", but he gains respect for her when he learns that she was a bank robber. The dialogue featured in the story was Rosenblatt's favourite from the entire show.

Rosenblat was given the storyline that ties up the second season. The scenes feature Miss Rosa being told that she is going to die from her cancer. Fellow inmate and prison van driver Lorna Morello (Yael Stone) feels sorry for her and exits the van urging Miss Rosa to escape. The final scene features Miss Rosa driving away when she notices Vee also making an escape from prison. Recalling an earlier altercation with Vee, Miss Rosa careens the vehicle at Vee killing her instantly. Rosenblat told Silman that she joyfully screamed in the bathroom for five minutes when she learned of her character's actions. She added "After all this effort to get rid of this woman, just evil incarnate, you know, and then I stroll along in my van. [In Miss Rosa voice] 'So rude, that one.' Amazing. That final scene was really great." During the scene Miss Rosa morphs into her younger incarnation as she becomes free once again. Rosenblat recalled the logistics of filming having to swap backwards and forth with Andujar to create the same position behind the wheel.

== Storylines ==
In the pilot episode, Miss Rosa meets new inmate Piper Chapman and offers her some advice. She reveals that she is suffering from cancer and undergoing chemotherapy. Miss Rosa is told that she needs an operation to improve her chances of survival. However the DOC refuse to fund the operation and she is told that she needs to keep having chemotherapy. The outcome of which means she is likely to die. She then reminisces about her past as bank robber in which all the men she kissed during heists ended up dead. She details her life to a fellow cancer patient Yusef and they bond. He decides to help her regain the adrenaline rush felt from robbery and they steal a nurse's purse. Miss Rosa is delighted to learn that Yusef has gone into remission but is sad to say goodbye. She returns to her cell and informs good friend Anita DeMarco (Lin Tucci) that she is dying before smelling the money she stole from the nurse.

Vee approaches Miss Rosa claiming to remember her and tries to recruit her. But she is not interested and tells Vee that she is a rude woman. Vee and Suzanne "Crazy Eyes" Warren (Uzo Aduba) later force Rosa to move out of the canteen and ruin her meal. Morello becomes concerned for Rosa during a hurricane which leaves Litchfield without power. Miss Rosa attends a hospital appointment and is told she only has weeks to live. The prison guard seems unfazed that she will die in prison. When a prison lockdown occurs Morello uses the opportunity to help Miss Rosa escape. She takes the offer and escapes from prison and on the way spots Vee. Recalling how Vee had treated her, Miss Rosa deliberately runs Vee down and kills her. She then drives off, laughing, toward her implied death in the quarry ahead. Her death is confirmed in the following episode when a guard reveals that she "(drove their) outdated crap into a quarry".

== Reception ==
Anna Silman from Vulture described Miss Rosa as a "no-nonsense bank robber evolved from being a bit player to becoming one of season two's most fascinating breakout roles." She also praised the role for being "rich and unusual". Arielle Calderon of BuzzFeed named the character as "one of the Season 2’s new fan favorites". Elizabeth Freda from E! Online ranked Miss Rosa as the third best character from season two. The character's backstory was her favourite. She said that a "cursed bank robber" sounded corny, but worked well. Hilary Busis of Entertainment Weekly described the character as a forgettable non-entity during the first season. She also praised Stephanie Andujar's performance as Young Rosa and called for her own spin-off series to be created. Kimberley Potts of Yahoo! TV voted Miss Rosa's backstory as the second best one of the entire show. Vogue magazine's John Powers criticized it, however, writing, "bald Miss Rosa is never again as interesting after clumsy, overlong flashbacks to her criminal career."

HuffPost's Miller described Rosa as "the husky-voiced, curmudgeonly, terminal cancer patient who comes up for air just long enough to pluck a "tit hair" or knock off a bank." Jenee Osterheldt from The Kansas City Star said that "if there’s one thing that sticks out about her character, it’s that husky and seductive voice that steals every conversation. You want to hear her speak, to cling to her words and let her paint the picture." Anita Li writing for Mashable praised the character's friendship with Yusef stating "despite the depressing circumstances of their meeting, the pair's chemistry is entertaining for viewers to watch."

ScreenCrush's Britt Hayes said that Miss Rosa and Vee's stories dominated the second season, but that she was disappointed that the two stories collided to form the series finale. She felt that it was both comical and absurd. Kevin Fallon of The Daily Beast opined that the scene in which Miss Rosa learns she is dying was handled phenomenally. He also said that she deserved an award for killing Vee. Kate Zernike of The New York Times criticized the character's accent, believing it sounded more Russian. However, she thought Miss Rosa's last scene was both brilliant and exhilarating. Perri Nemiroff from Screen Rant praised the ending because it was emotional. She described Morello offering her freedom as an "especially moving season-ending thrill". She summed up Miss Rosa as being a kind person and branded it all more "gratifying" when she killed Vee. Entertainment Weekly readers voted Miss Rosa killing Vee as the "most shocking moment" of season two. Jayme Deerwester of USA Today said that Miss Rosa provided the best moments of season two, and that Rosenblatt deserved an Emmy Award. Dana Piccoli from AfterEllen.com said Miss Rosa was a character with the ability to "beguile me and break my heart". She called the scene with Rosa sniffing the stolen money as "euphoric". Lauren Hoffman of Cosmopolitan found that Miss Rosa's cancer struggle was "almost ignorable" during the first season, but viewers later saw her true self and her branded her refusal to care as her strength.
