= Stephanie Andujar =

American actress

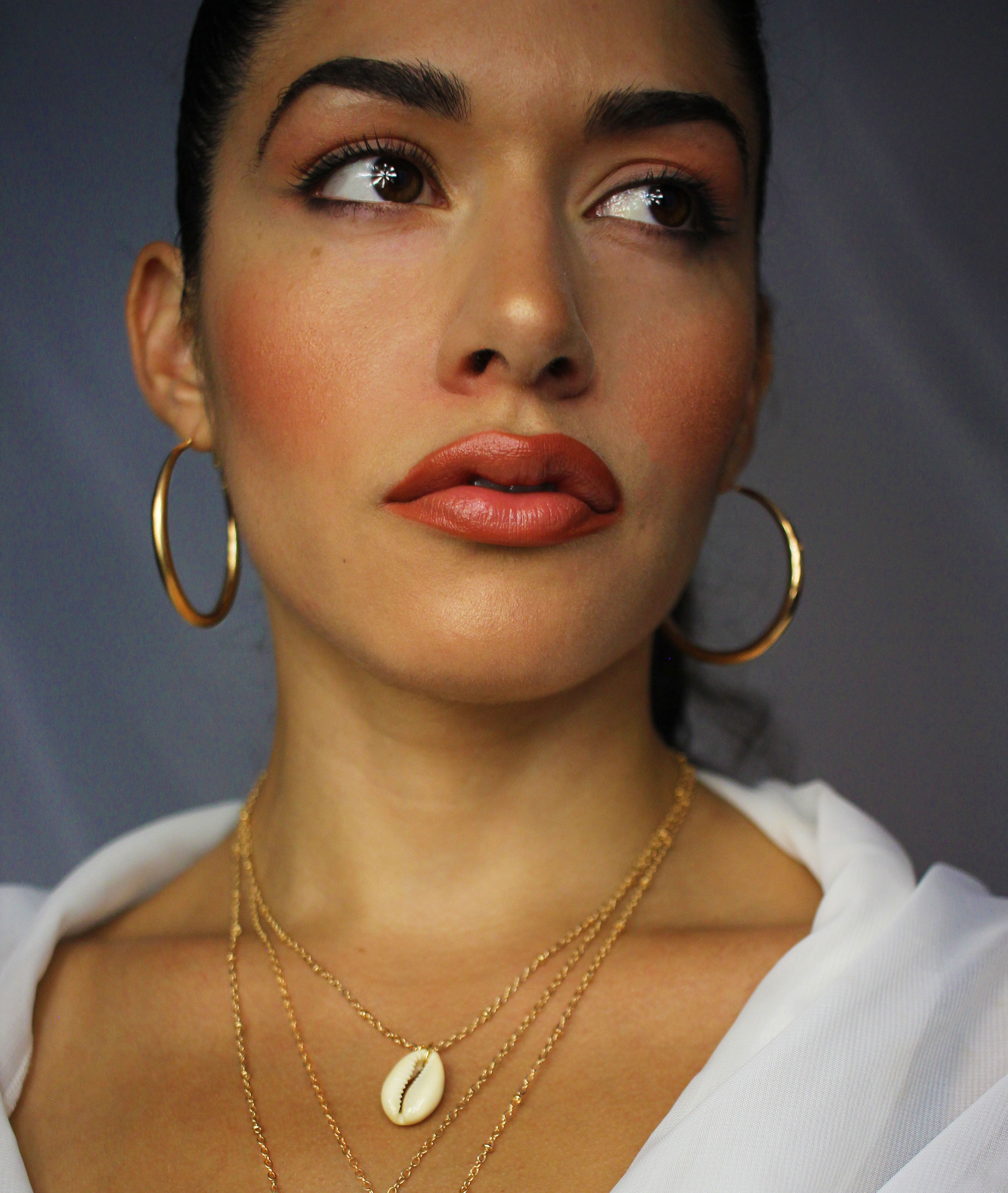
- Andujar in 2020
- Other name: StephA
- Education: Pace University
- Occupations: Actress, director, producer, writer, singer, dancer, songwriter
- Years active: 2007–present
- Parent(s): Hector Luis Andujar, Sr. Carmen L. Andujar
- Relatives: 2
- Website: stephanieandujar.com

Stephanie Andujar, nicknamed StephA, is an American actress, director, producer, writer, singer, dancer and songwriter. She is known for her comedic and dramatic roles. Starring in the Academy Award-winning film Precious (2009), Pariah (2011), See Girl Run (2012), Babygirl (2013), A Walk Among the Tombstones (2014), and the film Marjorie Prime (2017). Her television career includes CBS's Blue Bloods (2018), NBC's Law & Order: SVU (2007), nurse drama Mercy (2010), and Blindspot (2015). Andujar received praise for her performance in Orange is the New Black Season 2 (2014) as young Miss Rosa. Stephanie also starred in theatre performances from The Wiz, The Crucible, and The Good Woman of Setzuan.

== Early life and education ==
Andujar's father, Hector Andujar, was born in Ponce, Puerto Rico and her mother Carmen Andujar (of Puerto Rican descent) is an NYPD School Safety Agent, born in Chelsea, New York. She has an older sister Melanie Andujar and a younger brother Hector Andujar Jr. Her family first resided in Harlem, then to Queens, finally settling back to the neighborhood in Manhattan. While being raised in Chelsea-Elliot Houses housing projects, Andujar started acting at the age of 12, when her parents enrolled her at a Beacon after-school arts program. At 13, she landed the part of the Scarecrow in the musical The Wiz. While performing in The Wiz a talent manager noticed her and signed her up immediately. Her drama teacher Derrick Tyes pushed for her to audition for drama schools. She was then accepted at Talent Unlimited High School where she performed in more than 10 drama productions.

She obtained her Business Degree (2009) at Pace University in New York City.

== Career ==
In 2007, while attending Pace University, Stephanie auditioned for a role in Law & Order: SVU and booked her first role as Latrice Munez. She then auditioned for Push, which was being turned into a film directed by Lee Daniels. That story became the 2009 film Precious, and Andujar was cast as former heroin addict Rita Romero. She also played young Miss Rosa in Orange is the New Black Season 2. Hillary Busis of Entertainment Weekly raved about her performance and stated, "Stephanie Andujar, who plays Young Rosa, is mesmerizing, and I want her to star in a prequel spinoff called Portrait of the Prisoner as a Young Bank Robber."

In 2016, Stephanie formed Andujar Productions with her family and produced a comedy web series "StephA: One Woman Show", playing over 10 characters. The show is based on Stephanie's life growing up in New York City and currently has 5 seasons.

== Acting Credits ==
=== Film ===
Year	Title	Role	Notes
2008	Awilda and a Bee	Jillian	Short
2009	Precious	Rita Romero	
2011	Pariah	Pier girl	
2012	See Girl Run	Alicia	
2013	Babygirl	Awilda	
2014	A Walk Among the Tombstones	Cashier	
2017	Marjorie Prime	Julie	
2026	Love in Storytown	Blanca	

=== Television ===
Year	Title	Role	Notes
2007	Law & Order: Special Victims Unit	Latrice Munez	Episode: "Fight"
2010	Mercy	Deanna	2 episodes
2014	Orange Is the New Black	Young Rosa	2 episodes
2015	Blindspot	Isabella DeChirico	Episode: "Eight Slim Grins"
2016–2020	StephA: One Woman Show	Various	33 episodes
2018	Blue Bloods	Molly Chavez	2 episodes
2024	Heavy Hitters	Clara	2 episodes

=== Stage ===
Year	Title	Role(s)	Venue
1998	The Lion, the Witch and the Wardrobe	Fenris Ulf, Maugrim	Beacon Theatre, New York City
1999	The Wiz	Scarecrow (Oz)	Beacon Theatre, New York City
2000	The Good Woman of Setzuan	Shen Teh/ Shui Ta	Talent Unlimited High School, New York City
2001	A Midsummer Night's Dream	Demetrius	Talent Unlimited High School, New York City
2002	The Crucible	Tituba	Talent Unlimited High School, New York City
2002	Everyman (15th-century play)	Father/Waitress/Beauty	Talent Unlimited High School, New York City
2003	Tripitica's Puppet Box	Tripitica	Talent Unlimited High School, New York City
2004	The Bookbag	Maude	Collective:Unconscious, New York City
2005	History of the Word	Felice	Carolina Theatre of Greensboro, North Carolina
2024	Apron Strings: The Ties that Bind	Grace, Raquel, Dolores, Natasha, Maria	AMT Theater, Off-Broadway, New York City
2025	Orientation	The Authority, Leonor Gonzalez	Gural Theater, Off-Broadway, New York City
2025	The Rubber Band Company	Ann	American Theatre of Actors, Off-Broadway, New York City

== Awards and nominations ==
Year	Award	Category	Nominated work	Result
2009	8th Washington D.C. Area Film Critics Association Awards	Best Ensemble (shared with the film's ensemble cast)	Precious	Nominated
2009	30th Boston Society of Film Critics Awards	Best Cast (shared with the film's ensemble cast)	Precious	Won
