= John Powers (film critic) =

American film critic and writer (born 1951)

John Powers (born 1951) is an American writer, columnist, and film critic, best known for his work with LA Weekly, Vogue magazine, and (as of 2025), as pop culture critic at public broadcaster NPR. He is also known for his 2004 book Sore Winners: (And the Rest of Us) in George Bush's America. He was formerly professor of English at Georgetown University.

== Early life and education ==
John Powers was born in 1951. He received a B.A. from Oberlin College, a private college in Oberlin, Ohio, in 1973. He later earned a PhD at Stanford University in California, for his thesis on the topic of "Modern Thought and Literature".

== Career ==
Powers was appointed assistant professor of English at Georgetown University in Washington, D.C. in 1976, where he worked until 1985.

In 1985 he became film critic for LA Weekly in Los Angeles, California. In 1994 he was appointed film critic for Vogue, where he continued for six years before taking a break, returning to work for them in 2004. From 2001 until 2005 he wrote a weekly media and politics column for LA Weekly, and held the role of deputy editor of the magazine at some point.

Powers was appointed film critic at NPR, in a role lasting six years, before becoming "pop culture and critic-at-large" on NPR's Fresh Air with Terry Gross, a role he retains as of November 2025.

For a while Powers was food critic for Gourmet magazine. He has also previously written pieces for Harper's Bazaar, The Nation, The Washington Post, and The New York Times, and was a contributing editor for Vogue until around 2018. He has also written for New York magazine's Vulture website, MusicOMH, and RaEL Film Guide.

== Books ==
Powers' book Sore Winners (initially subtitled (And the Rest of Us) in George Bush's America, first published in 2004, looks at American culture during the presidency of George W. Bush. A reviewer in Kirkus Reviews wrote "Solid work from a cultural critic who merits a broader audience". The book was also reviewed by Jonathan Yardley in Washington Post Book World, by Timothy Noah in The New York Times Book Review, and by several others in notable publications, mostly positively.

It was published in paperback in 2005 without the subtitle.

In 2016 he published WKW: The Cinema of Wong Kar Wai, which he co-wrote with Hong Kong film director Wong Kar-wai.

== Membership and other work ==
Powers is an approved reviewer for review aggregator Rotten Tomatoes, and a member of the Los Angeles Film Critics Association.

== Personal life ==
Powers married Sandi Tan, and they were living in Pasadena, California, in 2023.
