= Lorna Morello =

- Orange Is the New Black character
- Yael Stone as Lorna Morello
- First appearance: "I Wasn't Ready" (2013)
- Last appearance: "Here's Where We Get Off" (2019)
- Portrayed by: Yael Stone

In-universe information
- Family: Stansie Morello (mother); Joe Morello (father); Francine (sister)
- Spouse: Vince Muccio
- Significant other: Nicky Nichols (ex-lover)
- Children: Sterling Muccio
- Religion: Catholic

Lorna Morello is a fictional character from the Netflix dramedy series Orange Is the New Black, played by Yael Stone. Stone was initially contracted for one episode, but was quickly promoted to series regular. Morello is based on two real-life inmates featured in Piper Kerman's 2010 memoir Orange Is the New Black: My Year in a Women's Prison. Morello is Italian-American, and is portrayed as being a positive, bold, opinionated person and "a hopeless romantic". She has a distinctive accent, which is a mix of Brooklyn and Boston. Morello made her first screen appearance during the season one premiere episode "I Wasn't Ready".

In the beginning of the first season, Morello was in a sexual relationship with Nicky Nichols (Natasha Lyonne). She later ended the relationship, as she felt she was betraying her fiancé, Christopher (Stephen O'Reilly). Morello's role was increased in the second season, and her backstory was shown in its fourth episode, "A Whole Other Hole", where it was revealed that she was not engaged to Christopher, and had in fact stalked and harassed him after one date. In the third season, Morello marries Vince Muccio (John Magaro). The character and Stone's portrayal received a generally positive reception from television critics.

== Creation and casting ==
On September 17, 2012, Nellie Andreeva from Deadline Hollywood reported that Australian actress Yael Stone had been cast as a Boston-Italian transport driver in Orange Is the New Black. The character was initially called Rosemarie Perrone. Stone auditioned for the show on August 19, 2012, the day after her wedding to actor Dan Spielman. She originally tried out for the role of Nicky Nichols, but actress Natasha Lyonne was cast instead. Stone was then brought back to try out for Morello. She auditioned with Morello's distinctive accent and she found out she had won the role two days later. Stone was initially contracted for one episode, but the producers kept bringing her back.

Morello is based on two real-life inmates featured in Piper Kerman's 2010 memoir Orange Is the New Black: My Year in a Women's Prison. Stone did not talk to the writers about the inspiration for Morello, as she did not want to confuse herself during filming. She later learned who inspired her character after speaking with Kerman's husband. Stone said "when I began the show, I had my ideas about who Morello was, but it was pretty fascinating to really understand these characters, these supporting roles, are made of people and an experience that actually happened." During her research for the role, Stone read some first-hand accounts from women in prison and spoke with lawyers and judges about their clients.

== Development ==
=== Characterization ===
In her fictional backstory, Morello grew up in Boston, after her Brooklyn mother married an Italian Bostonian man. Morello's home life was shown in the fourth episode of the second season. Morello's mother needed constant care, as she was ill, while her father and brother just sat around the house watching television. Morello escaped by going to the movies and committing mail fraud by purchasing designer clothing online, then claiming she never received the items to get a refund. Her bedroom walls were shown to be covered in posters and collages, which prompted Eliza Berman from Slate to note that Morello had created a "teenaged refuge" and that she was "stuck in adolescence". Morello received a 34-month sentence for her crime, the nature of which was not initially revealed. It also emerged that Morello had a fiancé, Christopher, on the outside and she was "a hopeless romantic". Morello was the first inmate Piper Chapman (Taylor Schilling) met at Litchfield, as she was the prison's transport driver. Stone told Seanna Cronin from The Toowoomba Chronicle that Morello's role in the prison was to welcome new inmates and show them around. Stone said Morello was a positive person and "a really vulnerable human being", who was dealing with her situation the best she could. She also described Morello as being "pretty bold sometimes, and weirdly opinionated."

Morello's distinctive accent is a mix of Brooklyn and Boston. Stone, who normally speaks with her native Australian accent, auditioned with the accent, and worked hard on getting the phonetics and the emphasis on the vowels right. She also travelled to Boston to do some research and met with a dialect coach. Stone stayed in character for her first four months on set to help perfect the accent. Stone felt that she would never perfect the accent, due to the intricacies of the dialect. The actress later said the accent reflected the fact that Morello's had drifted down the East Coast and had not quite found where she belonged. Morello is a big fan of the musical film West Side Story and its lead actress Natalie Wood, so she styles her hair and make-up in a similar way. The show's stylists commented that Morello's look is also inspired by bridal make-up. Morello scrapes out lipstick tubes with her fingernails to achieve her signature red lips, and she uses instant coffee to create brown eye shadow. Her vintage-style waves are set with toilet paper curlers and Lizzy Dening for Grazia observed that they reflected Morello's "romantic ideals". Morello's pre-prison style consisted of designer outfits, as showcased at her trial when she wore a little Dolce & Gabbana dress covered in chains. Stone thought that the dress showed that Morello did not take her crimes seriously. She also praised the show's costume designer, Jenn Rogien, for Morello's "transformative" style.

=== Relationship with Nicky Nichols ===
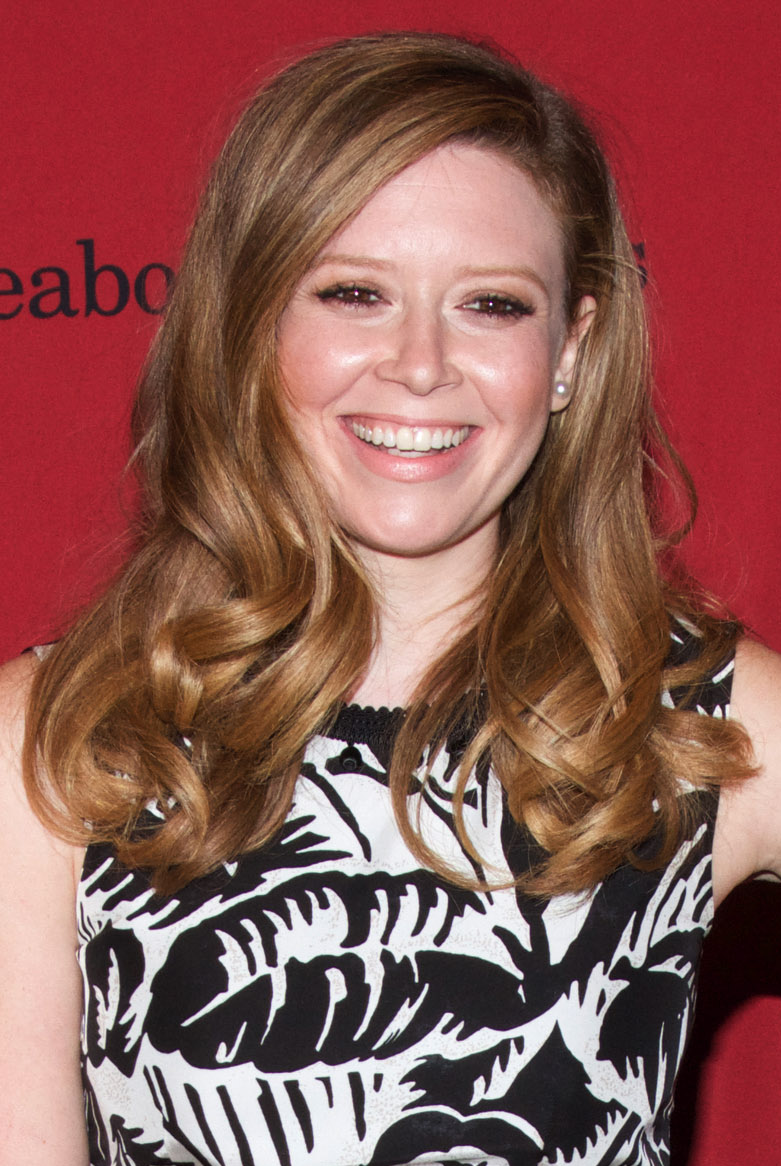
Morello had a sexual relationship with fellow inmate Nicky Nichols played by Natasha Lyonne (pictured).

At the beginning of the first season, Morello is in a sexual relationship with fellow inmate Nicky Nichols (Natasha Lyonne). However, she suddenly ends it, as she feels guilty about betraying her fiancé Christopher (Stephen O'Reilly). Lyonne said that the character's relationship had been "push-pull" and they had both been through a lot with their obsessive-compulsive personalities. Stone called the sex scenes between Morello and Nicky "a privilege" to film and thought they were well written and necessary to the show, as they showed a part of prison life. After Nicky learns the truth about Morello's fiancé Christopher, she comforts Morello and lets her know that she accepted her for who she was. Lyonne thought the scene was "an interesting culmination" of what Morello and Nicky had been through, and believed that they would be bonded forever by it.

Lyonne explained, "it's a moment that's very true to life. Even if it's not a romantic relationship, you can say, 'I really love you unconditionally. I see who you are completely. I'm here for you, and I love you.' Whether it's just as friends or romantically." Stone told Kevin Fallon from The Daily Beast that Morello was uncomfortable at being forced into being honest about Christopher, but thought Nicky's reaction was "amazing" and important for Morello to hear. Lyonne added that Nicky's relationship with Morello was one of the most "significant" in her life. Stone hoped that Morello would reconcile romantically with Nicky, as she missed working closely with Lyonne. Lyonne believed that Morello would have to treat Nicky as an equal for them to get back together, which Sadie Gennis from TV Guide doubted Morello would be mature enough to do.

=== Character expansion ===
Morello was a recurring character for the first and second seasons of Orange Is the New Black. In March 2014, series creator Jenji Kohan said Morello's backstory would be revealed in the second season. While Stone commented there would be some "pretty hard hitting truths coming out" and that she was amazed at what happens to her character. Lorna exhibits a pathological need to lie. The episode, titled "A Whole Other Hole", revealed that Morello's often mentioned fiancé, Christopher MacLaren (Stephen O'Reilly), was not actually her fiancé and she had been incarcerated for stalking and terrorizing him. Stone learned the truth about Morello's backstory the day she got the script for the episode. Prior to that, she had imagined her own version of Morello's history, believing that she might have committed an assault or been charged for the mail fraud. Stone pointed out that there had been some hints that Morello was not telling the truth during previous episodes, including Nicky mentioning that Christopher had not been to visit and Morello's sister, Francine (Kristen Sieh), calling her to say that Christopher was getting married.

In flashbacks, it was shown that Morello and Christopher had a meet-cute at the local postal office. Their relationship did not go further than their first date, but Morello began stalking and threatening him, even going as far as to place a bomb under his girlfriend's car. Stone admitted that she was shocked at the storyline and had to research what kind of stalker Morello was. Stone believed Morello is an erotomaniac, someone who suffers from the delusion that their victim is in love with them. Stone did not excuse Morello's behavior, but pointed out that she was suffering from an illness and needed help. She continued, "A lot of people who are mentally imbalanced do end up in prison because they don’t have the kind of support they need. The great beauty of Orange is that it illuminates these very sad lives that probably shouldn't have ended up in prison."

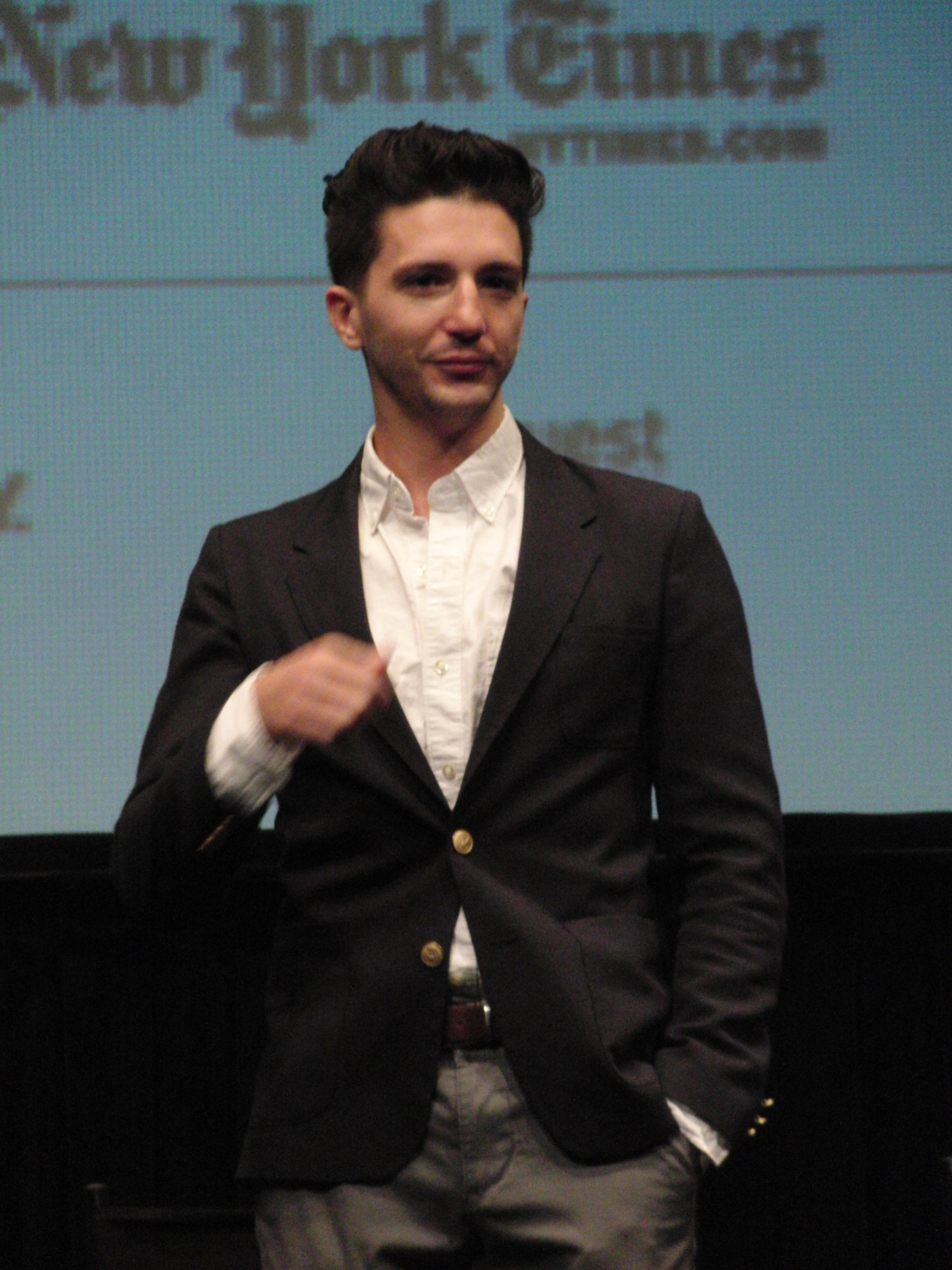
Actor John Magaro (pictured) joined the season 3 cast as Morello's love interest and eventual husband, Vince Muccio.

After taking Miss Rosa (Barbara Rosenblat) to a hospital appointment, Morello took advantage of the situation and drove to Christopher's house. After breaking in, Morello took a bath while wearing his fiancée's wedding veil. After reading the script, Stone became worried that if Morello was caught, she might lose her job on the show. However, when Morello heard Christopher coming home, she managed to escape and get the van back to the hospital in time. Stone explained that the storyline was challenging to film, as she was alone with her character for the majority of the time. She also decided to do her own stunt when Morello jumped out of the window. After realising that Morello had been in his home, Christopher broke the restraining order and "brutally" confronted Morello in the prison. Stone called the moment "very painful" for Morello, especially when she learned that Nicky had witnessed it.

Season 2 also saw Morello interacting with some different inmates, including Crazy Eyes (Uzo Aduba), which Stone was pleased with. She said "Obviously the show is so racially divided that often you're like you stay with your gang. You don't get to do a lot of stuff. But as the season goes on we get to interact in different ways." Morello also played a part in the season finale. After learning that Miss Rosa was dying from cancer, Morello felt sorry for her and exited the transport van, urging Miss Rosa to use it to escape. On June 13, 2014, it was announced that Stone had been promoted to the regular cast for the third season.

Following Nicky's removal to the maximum security prison, Morello becomes lonely and joins a pen pal program. She meets with several men and memorizes various facts about their hobbies to keep them interested. In the tenth episode of the season, she meets Vince Muccio (John Magaro) and proposes to him not long after. The couple are married in the season finale and Morello recites the lyrics of "I Want to Know What Love Is", knowing that Foreigner is Vince's favourite band. Unable to be alone together, they consummate the marriage in the same room with the guards nearby. Mallory Carra of Bustle.com praised the development in Morello's story arc and thought Vince was a better man for her than Christopher.

Nicky returns to Litchfield in the fourth season and tries to resume her romantic relationship with Morello. But Morello turns her down as she wants to remain faithful to Vince. Lyonne told Jackie Strause of The Hollywood Reporter that she thought both Nicky and Morello loved each other, but while Nicky has intimacy issues, Morello is in denial about her sexuality. Lyonne also commented, "and I think Lorna's probably somewhere on the spectrum. So for Lorna, it's probably a case where the person transcends gender and I think that it puts them both in this complicated dance with true intimacy. Where once they do decide to sign up full-on with that relationship, it's going to become very real pretty quickly because they are both pretty clear on the fact that they love each other so much."

In the fifth season, which portrays a prison riot in Litchfield, Morello and Nicky take over the prison pharmacy. Nicky makes sexual advances toward her, but she rebuffs them. When Nicky tells Morello that she has fallen in love with her, Morello kisses her passionately and they have sex. Afterwards, however, Morello says that she is pregnant, and only had sex with Nicky because of her pregnancy hormones. Nicky angrily tells Morello to stop toying with her affections and ends their friendship. Nevertheless, Morello saves Nicky from abusive head guard Desi Piscatella (Brad William Henke) and tells her that she fears that Vince wants nothing to do with the baby. Nicky then calls Vince and tells him that he needs to take responsibility for his wife and child, leading him and Morello to decide to be a family. She is then taken to another facility.

In the sixth season, Morello is reunited with Nicky in Litchfield Maximum Security, but they decide to keep their relationship platonic. Together, they manage Morello's prenatal care, and have an ongoing debate over what sex the child will be. They also witness Piper and Alex's wedding in the prison chapel.

== Reception ==
The character, her accent and Stone's performance have received mostly positive attention from critics. Laura Bennett from The New Republic branded Morello "one of the most memorable characters" on Orange Is New the Black, and said she had "the most amazing accent on television". While Sadie Gennis from TV Guide commented that Morello holds "a special place in our heart". Alyssa Rosenberg, writing for The Washington Post, observed "Yael Stone's performance as inmate Lorna Morello seems to be the consensus choice for biggest breakout." Rosenberg also noted that Morello's backstory gave her more depth.

John Boone and Jennifer Cady from E! Online placed Morello at number 11 on their list of the best and worst Orange Is the New Black inmates. Nijla Mu'min from Bitch praised Stone's "stirring" performance as Morello, and thought the character became more interesting following the revelation about her relationship with Christopher. Mu'min said "She becomes even more fascinating as a sweet, charming, racist woman living in delusion, denial, and dreams, like so many people in the world." Paste's Shannon M. Houston wrote that Morello's backstory was the first to surprise her and she believed the character became more "humanized—and complicated" during the second season.

Kimberly Potts from Yahoo! TV placed Morello's backstory at number one on her list of the ten best backstories. Potts dubbed Morello's story as "more shocking, more devastating, more brilliantly written and acted than nearly anything that didn't involve the wonderful Uzo Aduba in Season 2." Potts was saddened that "sweet and friendly" Morello was so disturbed that she might not get the happy ending she wants. However, Vogue's John Powers disliked Morello's backstory, saying she had to "labor mightily to overcome the cliché tale of her wacko romanticism, which felt so much richer when you only imagined it." In June 2015, Kevin Fallon from The Daily Beast said Morello had become a "fan favorite" and praised her upbeat and happy disposition, saying she was "a sunny breath of fresh air".

Orli Matlow of Bustle.com found Stone's portrayal of Morello "so endearing" that it makes the audience forget that she is a violent criminal. Matlow added that it would be "interesting" to see how Morello and Vince's marriage works out.

== See also ==
- List of Orange Is the New Black characters
