= Orange Is the New Black =

American comedy-drama television series by Jenji Kohan (2013-2019)

- Genre: Comedy-drama
- Created by: Jenji Kohan
- Based on: Orange Is the New Black: My Year in a Women's Prison by Piper Kerman
- Showrunner: Jenji Kohan
- Starring: Taylor Schilling; Laura Prepon; Michael Harney; Michelle Hurst; Kate Mulgrew; Jason Biggs; Uzo Aduba; Danielle Brooks; Natasha Lyonne; Taryn Manning; Selenis Leyva; Adrienne C. Moore; Dascha Polanco; Nick Sandow; Yael Stone; Samira Wiley; Jackie Cruz; Lea DeLaria; Elizabeth Rodriguez; Jessica Pimentel; Laura Gómez; Matt Peters; Dale Soules; Alysia Reiner
- Theme music composer: Regina Spektor
- Opening theme: "You've Got Time" by Regina Spektor
- Composers: Scott Doherty; Brandon Jay; Gwendolyn Sanford
- Country of origin: United States
- Original language: English
- No. of seasons: 7
- No. of episodes: 91 (list of episodes)

Production
- Executive producers: Jenji Kohan; Liz Friedman (pilot); Sara Hess; Tara Herrmann; Lisa Vinnecour; Neri Kyle Tannenbaum; Mark A. Burley
- Producer: Neri Kyle Tannenbaum
- Production location: New York
- Camera setup: Single-camera
- Running time: 51–93 minutes
- Production companies: Tilted Productions; Lionsgate Television
- Budget: $4 million per episode

Original release
- Network: Netflix
- Release: July 11, 2013 – July 26, 2019

Orange Is the New Black (sometimes abbreviated to OITNB) is an American comedy-drama television series created by Jenji Kohan for Netflix. It is based on Piper Kerman's memoir Orange Is the New Black: My Year in a Women's Prison (2010), about her experiences at FCI Danbury, a minimum security federal prison. Produced by Tilted Productions in association with Lionsgate Television, the series premiered on Netflix on July 11, 2013, and ran for seven seasons until July 26, 2019.

Orange Is the New Black received critical acclaim throughout its run and many accolades. Among other awards, it garnered 16 Emmy Award nominations and four wins in comedy and drama (the first series to score nominations in both genre categories), six Writers Guild of America Award nominations, six Golden Globe Award nominations, a Producers Guild of America Award, an American Film Institute Award, and a Peabody Award. As of 2016, Orange Is the New Black was Netflix's most-watched as well as its longest-running original series.

== Plot ==
The series begins revolving around Piper Chapman (Taylor Schilling), a 33-year-old woman living in New York City who is sentenced to 15 months in Litchfield Penitentiary, a minimum-security women's federal prison in Upstate New York. Chapman was convicted of transporting a suitcase full of drug money for her girlfriend Alex Vause (Laura Prepon), an international drug smuggler. The offense had occurred 10 years before the start of the series and in that time, Chapman had moved on to a quiet, law-abiding life among New York's upper middle class. Her sudden and unexpected indictment disrupts her relationships with her fiancé, family, and friends. In prison, Chapman is reunited with Vause (who named Chapman in her trial, resulting in Chapman's arrest), and they re-examine their relationship. Simultaneously, Chapman, along with the other inmates, attempts to grapple with prison's numerous, inherent struggles. Episodes often feature flashbacks of significant events from various inmates' and prison guards' pasts. These flashbacks typically depict how an inmate came to be in prison or develop a character's backstory. The prison is initially operated by the "Federal Department of Corrections" (a fictional version of the Federal Bureau of Prisons) and was in a later season acquired by the Management & Correction Corporation (MCC), a private prison company.

The fifth season shows the prisoners revolting against the guards, wardens, and the system after MCC's failed handling of an inmate's death at the hands of a guard in the fourth season. The inmate death had followed a peaceful protest and subsequent instigation of an inmate fight by another guard. Fueled by the conditions the inmates are forced to tolerate, as well as grudges against the prison guards, a three-day riot ensues. During the riot, some inmates attempt to negotiate better living conditions and seek justice for the death of the inmate, while others pursue their own interests and entertainment, and a few seek no involvement. At the emergence of the riot, the guard who incited the fight in the prior season is critically wounded by an inmate who took the gun the guard illegally brought into the prison. At the end of the season, the SERT team raids the prison to end the riot and remove all inmates from the facility. During this raid, a correctional officer is fatally wounded by a corrupt "strike team", which then conspires to blame the guard's death on a number of inmates who hid in an underground bunker, found by one inmate, and had taken the guard hostage. All inmates are transported to other prisons.

The consequences of the riot are shown in the sixth season. A number of the inmates, including Chapman and Vause, are transported to Litchfield Maximum Security. Most of these inmates are interrogated, and several of them are charged and sentenced for their involvement in the riot. In max, new inmates are introduced, alliances are made, and a gang-like war emerges between two prison blocks, spearheaded by a longstanding feud between two sisters and a grudge harbored by them toward a former maximum-security inmate who returned as a consequence of the riot (she had been moved to the minimum-security prison). Inmates who arrived from the minimum-security prison are either caught up or willingly participate in the war between prison blocks. The season portrays further corruption and guard brutality.

The seventh and final season provides an ending to various inmates' stories. Chapman and Vause continue their on/off again relationship. The season shows how some prisoners are able to move beyond their time in prison while others are captured by the system and through their own flaws and/or systemic problems in the structure of US society and its justice system are unable to progress. In addition to the established setting of Litchfield Max, a significant portion of the season takes place in a newly created ICE detention center for detained presumed undocumented immigrants, showing their struggles and lack of access to outside help in large part because of complete or extreme disregard of the law.

In each season, the series shows how various forms of corruption, funding cuts by the corporate owner to increase profits by millions, privatization of prison, overcrowding, guard brutality, and racial discrimination (among other issues) affect the prisoners' safety, health, and well-being. One of the show's key conflicts involves the minimum-security prison's Director of Human Activities (aka the warden, under privatization nomenclature), Joe Caputo, whose efforts and aims as a warden constantly conflict with the corporate interests of MCC, which acquires Litchfield Penitentiary as it risks closure. This theme is continued when a new forward-thinking and caring warden is hired at Litchfield Maximum Security and unlike Caputo, actually institutes educational programs and positive changes. She is fired for these actions and her attitude toward the corporate corruption, although her short-lived changes have profound results.

== Cast and characters ==
=== Main cast ===
- Taylor Schilling as Piper Chapman
- Laura Prepon as Alex Vause, inmate (seasons 1, 3–7; recurring season 2)
- Michael Harney as Sam Healy, correctional officer (seasons 1–4; guest season 6 and 7) (Note: Michael J. Harney was credited as main cast for season 5 but did not make an appearance.)
- Michelle Hurst as Miss Claudette Pelage, inmate (season 1)
- Kate Mulgrew as Galina "Red" Reznikov, inmate
- Jason Biggs as Larry Bloom, Piper's fiancé (seasons 1–2; guest season 5; recurring season 7)
- Uzo Aduba as Suzanne "Crazy Eyes" Warren, inmate (seasons 2–7; recurring season 1)
- Danielle Brooks as Tasha "Taystee" Jefferson, inmate (seasons 2–7; recurring season 1)
- Natasha Lyonne as Nicky Nichols, inmate (seasons 2–7; recurring season 1)
- Taryn Manning as Tiffany "Pennsatucky" Doggett, inmate (seasons 2–7; recurring season 1)
- Selenis Leyva as Gloria Mendoza, inmate (seasons 3–7; recurring seasons 1–2)
- Adrienne C. Moore as Cynthia "Black Cindy" Hayes, inmate (seasons 3–7; recurring seasons 1–2)
- Dascha Polanco as Dayanara "Daya" Diaz, inmate (seasons 3–7; recurring seasons 1–2)
- Nick Sandow as Joe Caputo, Captain of the Guard, later warden (seasons 3–7; recurring seasons 1–2)
- Yael Stone as Lorna Morello, inmate (seasons 3–7; recurring seasons 1–2)
- Samira Wiley as Poussey Washington, inmate (seasons 3–4; recurring seasons 1–2; guest seasons 5, 7)
- Jackie Cruz as Marisol "Flaca" Gonzales, inmate (seasons 4–7; recurring seasons 1–3)
- Lea DeLaria as Carrie "Big Boo" Black, inmate (seasons 4–5; recurring seasons 1–3; guest seasons 6–7)
- Elizabeth Rodriguez as Aleida Diaz, former inmate (seasons 4–7; recurring seasons 1–3)
- Jessica Pimentel as Maria Ruiz, inmate (seasons 5–7; recurring seasons 1–4)
- Laura Gómez as Blanca Flores, inmate (seasons 6–7; recurring seasons 1–5)
- Matt Peters as Joel Luschek, correctional officer (seasons 6–7; recurring seasons 1–5)
- Dale Soules as Frieda Berlin, inmate (seasons 6–7; recurring seasons 2–5)
- Alysia Reiner as Natalie "Fig" Figueroa, warden (season 7; recurring 1–3, 5–6; guest season 4)

=== Recurring cast ===
==== Inmates ====
- Laverne Cox as Sophia Burset (seasons 1–6; guest season 7)
- Diane Guerrero as Maritza Ramos (seasons 1–5, 7)
- Annie Golden as Norma Romano (seasons 1–5, guest season 7)
- Vicky Jeudy as Janae Watson (seasons 1–5, guest season 7)
- Julie Lake as Angie Rice (seasons 1–5, guest season 7)
- Emma Myles as Leanne Taylor (seasons 1–5, guest season 7)
- Abigail Savage as Gina Murphy (seasons 1–5, guest season 7)
- Constance Shulman as Yoga Jones (seasons 1–5, guest season 7)
- Lori Tan Chinn as Mei Chang (seasons 1–5, guest season 7)
- Tamara Torres as Emily "Weeping Woman" Germann (seasons 1–5, guest season 7)
- Lin Tucci as Anita DeMarco (seasons 1–5, guest season 7)
- Beth Fowler as Sister Jane Ingalls (seasons 1–4)
- Barbara Rosenblat as Rosa "Miss Rosa" Cisneros (seasons 1–2; guest season 3)
- Madeline Brewer as Tricia Miller (season 1)
- Kimiko Glenn as Brook Soso (seasons 2–5, guest season 7)
- Lori Petty as Lolly Whitehill (seasons 3–4, 6–7; guest season 2)
- Lorraine Toussaint as Yvonne "Vee" Parker (season 2)
- Blair Brown as Judy King (seasons 3–5, guest season 7)
- Emily Althaus as Maureen Kukudio (seasons 3–5)
- Ruby Rose as Stella Carlin (season 3; guest season 4)
- Daniella De Jesus as Irene "Zirconia" Cabrera (seasons 4–7)
- Shannon Esper as Alana Dwight (seasons 4–7)
- Rosal Colon as Carmen "Ouija" Aziza (seasons 4–5; guest season 6)
- Francesca Curran as Helen "Skinhead Helen" Van Maele (seasons 4–5; guest season 6)
- Kelly Karbacz as Kasey Sankey (seasons 4–5, guest season 7)
- Amanda Stephen as Alison Abdullah (seasons 4–5, guest season 7)
- Asia Kate Dillon as Brandy Epps (seasons 4–5)
- Miriam Morales as Ramona "Pidge" Contreras (seasons 4–5)
- Jolene Purdy as Stephanie Hapakuka (seasons 4–5)
- Shirley Roeca as Juanita Vasquez (seasons 6–7, guest season 5)
- Rebecca Knox as Tina Swope (seasons 6–7)
- Sipiwe Moyo as Adeola Chinede (seasons 6–7)
- Besanya Santiago as Raquel "Creech" Munoz (seasons 6–7)
- Finnerty Steeves as Beth Hoefler (seasons 6–7)
- Christina Toth as Annalisa Damiva (seasons 6–7)
- Amanda Fuller as Madison "Badison" Murphy (seasons 6–7)
- Vicci Martinez as Dominga "Daddy" Duarte (seasons 6, guest season 7)
- Mackenzie Phillips as Barbara "Barb" Denning (season 6)
- Henny Russell as Carol Denning (season 6)
- Ismenia Mendes as Tali Grapes (season 7)

==== Staff ====
- Catherine Curtin as Wanda Bell (seasons 1–5, 7)
- Joel Marsh Garland as Scott O'Neill (seasons 1–5, 7)
- Brendan Burke as Wade Donaldson (seasons 1–4)
- Pablo Schreiber as George "Pornstache" Mendez (seasons 1–3; guest seasons 5, 7)
- Lolita Foster as Eliqua Maxwell (seasons 1–3)
- Matt McGorry as John Bennett (seasons 1–3)
- Lauren Lapkus as Susan Fischer (seasons 1–2; guest season 7)
- Kaipo Schwab as Igme Dimaguiba (season 1; guest seasons 2–4)
- Germar Terrell Gardner as Charles Ford (seasons 2–3)
- James McMenamin as Charlie "Donuts" Coates (seasons 3–6)
- Alan Aisenberg as Baxter "Gerber" Bayley (seasons 3–5)
- Jimmy Gary Jr. as Felix Rikerson (seasons 3–4; guest season 5)
- Mike Birbiglia as Danny Pearson (seasons 3–4)
- Marsha Stephanie Blake as Berdie Rogers (season 3)
- Beth Dover as Linda Ferguson (seasons 4–7; guest season 3)
- Nick Dillenburg as Ryder Blake (seasons 4–7)
- Mike Houston as Lee Dixon (seasons 4–7)
- Emily Tarver as Bambi "Artesian" McCullough (seasons 4–7)
- Brad William Henke as Desi Piscatella (seasons 4–5; guest season 6)
- Evan Arthur Hall as B. Stratman (seasons 4–5)
- John Palladino as Josh (seasons 4–5)
- Michael Torpey as Thomas "Humps" Humphrey (seasons 4–5)
- Hunter Emery as Rick Hopper (seasons 5–7)
- Shawna Hamic as Virginia "Ginger" Copeland (seasons 6–7)
- Susan Heyward as Tamika Ward (seasons 6–7)
- Josh Segarra as Danilo Stefanovic (seasons 6–7)
- Greg Vrotsos as Greg Hellman (seasons 6–7)
- Nicholas Webber as J. Alvarez (seasons 6–7)
- Branden Wellington as Jarod Young (seasons 6–7)
- Adam Lindo as Carlos "Clitvack" Litvack (season 7)

==== Others ====
- Michael Chernus as Cal Chapman (seasons 1–4, 7; guest season 6)
- Tanya Wright as Crystal Burset (seasons 1–4; guest season 6)
- Berto Colon as Cesar Velazquez (seasons 1–3, 7; guest season 5)
- Deborah Rush as Carol Chapman (seasons 1–3; guest seasons 5, 7)
- Tracee Chimo as Neri Feldman (seasons 1–3, 7)
- Maria Dizzia as Polly Harper (seasons 1–2; guest season 7)
- Ian Paola as Yadriel (seasons 2–5; guest season 7)
- John Magaro as Vince Muccio (seasons 3–5, 7)
- Mary Steenburgen as Delia Mendez-Powell (season 3; guest season 5)
- Miguel Izaguirre as Dario "Diablo" Zúñiga (seasons 6–7; guest seasons 1, 4–5)
- Michael J. Burg as Detective Mark Bellamy (season 6)
- Bill Hoag as Bill Chapman (season 7; guest seasons 1–3)
- Karina Arroyave as Karla Córdova (season 7)
- Melinna Bobadilla as Santos Chaj (season 7)
- Marie-Lou Nahhas as Shani Abboud (season 7)
- Alicia Witt as Zelda (season 7)
- Alysia Joy Powell as Wyndolyn Capers (season 7)

== Episodes ==
Season	Episodes	Originally released
1	13	July 11, 2013
2	13	June 6, 2014
3	13	June 11, 2015
4	13	June 17, 2016
5	13	June 9, 2017
6	13	July 27, 2018
7	13	July 26, 2019

== Production ==
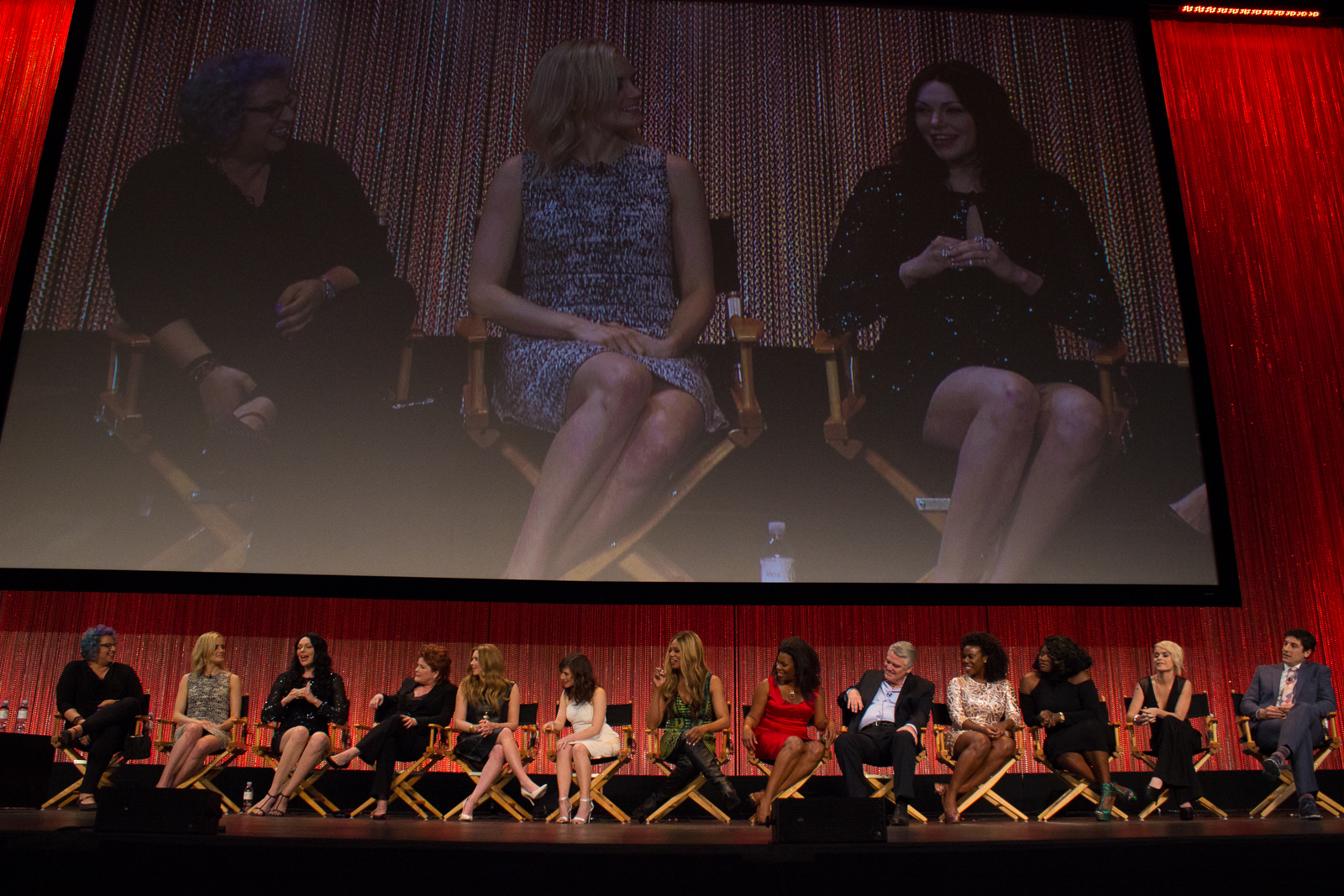
The series cast at The Paley Center For Media's PaleyFest 2014 event honoring the show

Show creator Jenji Kohan read Piper Kerman's memoir after a friend sent it to her. She then set up a meeting with Kerman to pitch her on a TV adaptation, which she admits she "screwed up", as she spent most of the time asking Kerman about her experiences rather than selling her on the show. This appealed to Kerman as it let her know that she was a fan and she signed off on the adaptation. Kohan would later go on to describe the main character, Piper Chapman, as a "trojan horse" for the series, allowing it to focus on characters whose demographics would not normally be represented on TV. Its budget was estimated to be $4 million per episode.

In July 2011, it was revealed that Netflix was in negotiations with Lionsgate for a 13-episode TV adaptation of Kerman's memoirs with Kohan as creator. In November 2011, negotiations were finalized and the series had been greenlit. Kohan had initially wanted to cast Katie Holmes in the role of Piper Chapman, and met with the actress to discuss it, but Holmes had other commitments. Casting announcements began in August 2012 with Taylor Schilling, the first to be cast, as Piper Chapman, followed by Jason Biggs as Piper's fiancé Larry Bloom.

Laura Prepon and Yael Stone were next to join the series, as Alex Vause and Lorna Morello, respectively. Abigail Savage, who plays Gina, and Alysia Reiner, who plays Fig, had auditioned for role of Alex Vause. Prepon initially auditioned for Piper Chapman; however, Kohan felt she would not worry about her [in prison], noting a "toughness and a presence to her that wasn't right for the character." Kohan instead gave her the role of Alex. Stone had originally auditioned for the role of Nicky Nichols, but she was not considered "tough enough" for the character; she was asked to audition for Lorna Morello instead. Likability was important for Morello, whom casting director Jen Euston deemed "a very helpful, nice, sweet Italian girl." Natasha Lyonne was to audition for Alex, but was asked to read for the character Nicky Nichols; "[Kohan knew] she could do Nicky with her eyes closed. She was perfect," said Euston. Laverne Cox, a black transgender woman, was cast as Sophia Burset, a transgender character. The Advocate touted Orange Is the New Black as possibly the first women-in-prison narrative to cast a transgender woman for this type of role. Uzo Aduba read for the part of Janae Watson but was offered the character Suzanne "Crazy Eyes" Warren. Taryn Manning was offered the role of Tiffany "Pennsatucky" Doggett. This American Life host Ira Glass was offered a role as a public radio host, but he declined. The role instead went to Robert Stanton, who plays the fictional host Maury Kind.

Orange is the New Black is set in a fictional minimum-security prison in Litchfield, New York, which is a real town in the southern tier of New York, but it does not have a federal penitentiary. The series began filming in the former Rockland Children's Psychiatric Center in Rockland County, New York, on March 7, 2013. The building, part of the what was then the Rockland State Hospital campus, was completed in 1970 and closed by 2010. The title sequence features close-up shots of female non-actors who were formerly prisoners, including Kerman herself; she is the one who blinks.

On June 27, 2013, prior to the series' premiere, Netflix renewed the show for a second season consisting of 13 episodes. For the second season, Uzo Aduba, Taryn Manning, Danielle Brooks, and Natasha Lyonne were promoted to series regulars. Laura Prepon did not return as a series regular for a second season because of scheduling conflicts, but returned for season 3 as a regular. On May 5, 2014, the series was renewed for a third season, as revealed by actress Laura Prepon. For the third season, several actors were promoted to series regulars, including Selenis Leyva, Adrienne C. Moore, Dascha Polanco, Nick Sandow, Yael Stone, and Samira Wiley. Both Jason Biggs and Pablo Schreiber were confirmed as not returning for the third season, but Schreiber appeared in the 10th episode of the third season. The series was renewed for a fourth season on April 15, 2015, prior to its third-season release. For the fourth season, Jackie Cruz and Lea DeLaria were promoted to series regulars; with Elizabeth Rodriguez also being promoted by the season's sixth episode. On February 5, 2016, the series was renewed for a fifth, sixth and seventh season. In season six, Dale Soules, Laura Gómez, and Matt Peters were promoted to series regulars. On October 17, 2018, Netflix announced that the seventh season would be the series' last and would be released on July 26, 2019.

In 2018, Lionsgate Television were discussing "a potential sequel" to the series.

== Reception ==
=== Critical response ===
Critical response of Orange Is the New Black
Season	Rotten Tomatoes	Metacritic
1	95% (58 reviews)	79 (32 reviews)
2	96% (53 reviews)	89 (31 reviews)
3	95% (64 reviews)	83 (24 reviews)
4	94% (52 reviews)	86 (19 reviews)
5	71% (49 reviews)	67 (20 reviews)
6	85% (39 reviews)	69 (14 reviews)
7	98% (44 reviews)	81 (12 reviews)

Orange Is the New Black received critical acclaim throughout its run. It has been particularly praised for humanizing prisoners and for its depiction of race, sexuality, gender and body types.

The first season received positive reviews from critics. Review aggregator Metacritic gave it a weighted average score of 79/100 based on reviews from 32 critics, indicating favorable reviews. On Rotten Tomatoes, season one has a 95% approval rating based on 58 reviews, with an average rating of 8.3/10. The site's critical consensus is "Orange Is the New Black is a sharp mix of black humor and dramatic heft, with interesting characters and an intriguing flashback structure."

Hank Stuever, television critic for The Washington Post, gave Orange Is the New Black a perfect score. In his review of the series, he stated: "In Jenji Kohan's magnificent and thoroughly engrossing new series, Orange Is the New Black, prison is still the pits. But it is also filled with the entire range of human emotion and stories, all of which are brought vividly to life in a world where a stick of gum could ignite either a romance or a death threat." Maureen Ryan, of The Huffington Post, wrote: "Orange is one of the best new programs of the year, and the six episodes I've seen have left me hungry to see more."

The second season received critical acclaim. Rotten Tomatoes gave a rating of 96%, with an average rating of 9.2/10 based on 54 reviews. The site's critical consensus reads: "With a talented ensemble cast bringing life to a fresh round of serial drama, Orange Is the New Black's sophomore season lives up to its predecessor's standard for female-led television excellence." Metacritic gave the second season a score of 89/100 based on 31 critics, indicating "universal acclaim". David Wiegland of the San Francisco Chronicle gave the season a positive review, calling the first six episodes "not only as great as the first season, but arguably better." James Poniewozik, writing for Time, noted how the show "had expanded its ensemble so far beyond Piper", also stating that "Larry [and] every element of Piper’s life and family outside the prison needs to go", because of the show "not [being] interested in giving them the same depth of characterization it gives to the rest of its prisoners and even its prison guards".

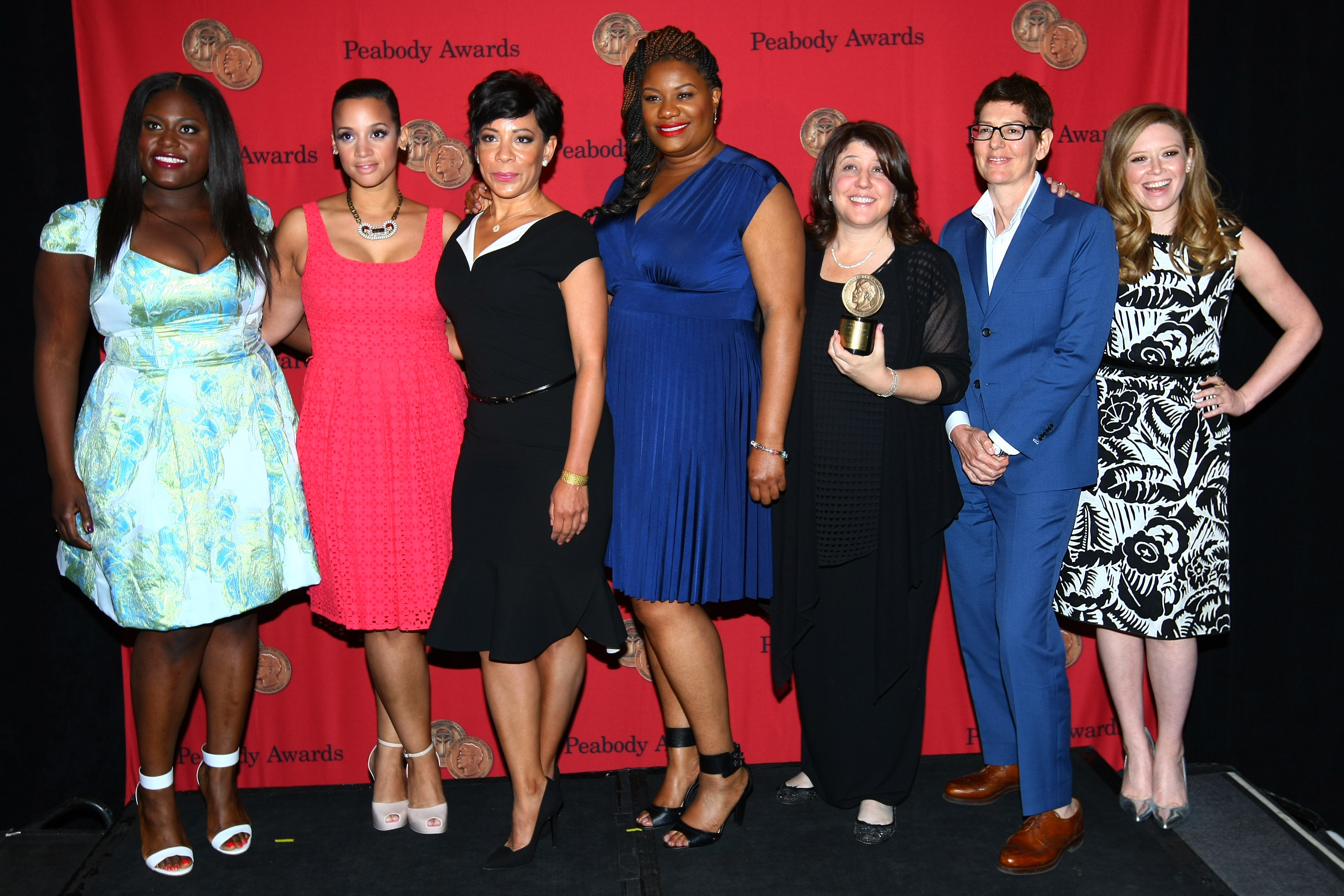
Members of the cast and crew with their Peabody Award, May 2014

The third season also received critical acclaim. On Metacritic, it has a score of 83/100 based on 24 reviews. On Rotten Tomatoes, it has a 95% rating with an average score of 8.1/10 based on 64 reviews. The site's critical consensus reads: "Thanks to its blend of potent comedy and rich character work, Orange is the New Black remains a bittersweet pleasure in its third season." Richard Lawson from Vanity Fair gave the season a positive review, stating that the season "may find the walls closing in on many characters, but the show feels as boundless and free as it ever has". Spencer Kornhaber from The Atlantic stated that Piper Chapman's scenes "once felt obligatory by mere dint of the fact that they powered the show’s plot, but now they mainly allow Taylor Schilling to demonstrate her comedic chops". Anne Cohen from The Forward said the season used "traditionally anti-Semitic tropes", while Nathan Abrams from Haaretz described a "remarkably upbeat and positive representation of Judaism".

The fourth season received critical acclaim. On Metacritic, it has a score of 86/100 based on 19 reviews. On Rotten Tomatoes, it has a 94% rating with an average score of 8.6/10 based on 52 reviews. The site's critical consensus reads: "Orange is the New Black is back and better than ever, with a powerful fourth season full of compelling performances by the ensemble cast." James Poniewozik of The New York Times reviewed the fourth season as "Do you measure the quality of a TV season as a beginning-to-end average or by how well it ends? By the first yardstick, Season 4 is ambitious but uneven; by the latter, it's the series' best." Karol Collymore from Bitch magazine praised the show's past seasons for its representation of women of color, while criticizing the fourth season due to the "visceral racist acts" and racial slurs that occur "constantly, in every episode", stating that "it felt exhausting". The Hindustan Times praised the season for how it dealt with the topic of rape, while negatively describing the new characters as "mere one-dimensional fillers". IGN gave the season a positive review, describing it as "dramatic and insightful".

The fifth season received "generally favorable reviews". On Metacritic, it has a score of 67/100 based on 20 reviews. On Rotten Tomatoes, it has a 71% rating with an average score of 7.3/10 based on 49 reviews. The site's critical consensus reads: "Orange Is the New Black's fifth season offers up more of the sharp writing and dizzying tonal juggling acts that fans expect – albeit somewhat less successfully." Chris Orstendorf from The Daily Dot gave the season a positive review, although negatively describing "the decision to tell the entire story of season 5 in the span of three days". Emily James from Vox rated the season 3.5/5, praising the "stronger focus" compared to "the scattered nature of seasons three and four", and criticizing the season for having "[often] desperately cut to something that’s supposed to be funny, and it will only be so in theory". Rafael Gonzaga from Omelete rated the season four out of five star, calling the fourth season better although still praising the fifth.

The sixth season received positive reviews from critics, with many critics noting its improvement over the previous season. On Metacritic, it has a score of 69/100 based on 14 reviews. On Rotten Tomatoes, it has an 85% rating with an average score of 7.3/10 based on 39 reviews. The site's critical consensus reads: "Brutality and humor continue to mesh effectively in a season of Orange Is the New Black that stands as a marked improvement from its predecessor, even if some arcs are more inspired than others." PinkNews praised the season's "unlikely pairings of existing characters who have barely had so much as a scene together previously".

The seventh season has a score of 81/100 on Metacritic based on 12 reviews. On Rotten Tomatoes, it has a 98% rating with an average score of 7.8/10 based on 45 reviews. The site's consensus reads: "Carried by its exceptional ensemble, Orange Is the New Black's final season gets straight to the point, tackling hard-hitting issues with the same dramatic depth and gallows humor that made the show so ground-breaking to begin with".

In 2019, Orange Is the New Black was ranked 58th on The Guardian's list of the 100 best TV shows of the 21st century.

=== Accolades ===
Orange Is the New Black has received many accolades since its debut. The series has garnered 16 Emmy Award nominations and four wins. For its first season, it received 12 Emmy Award nominations, including Outstanding Comedy Series, Outstanding Writing for a Comedy Series, and Outstanding Directing for a Comedy Series, winning three. Taylor Schilling received a Golden Globe Award nomination for Best Actress in a Television Series – Drama. In 2013, the American Film Institute selected the series as one of the Top 10 Television Programs of the Year.

A new Emmy rule in 2015, classifying half-hour shows as comedies and hour-long shows as dramas, forced the series to change categories from comedy to drama for its second season. That year, the series received four Emmy nominations, including Outstanding Drama Series, and Aduba won her second Emmy Award, for Outstanding Supporting Actress in a Drama Series. Orange Is the New Black became the first series to receive Emmy nominations in both comedy and drama categories. For its second season, the series also received three Golden Globe Award nominations: Best Television Series – Musical or Comedy, Best Actress – Television Series Musical or Comedy for Schilling, and Best Supporting Actress – Series, Miniseries or Television Film for Aduba. At the 21st Screen Actors Guild Awards, the series won Outstanding Performance by an Ensemble in a Comedy Series and Aduba won Outstanding Performance by a Female Actor in a Comedy Series.

For its third season, Orange Is the New Black won Screen Actors Guild Awards for Outstanding Performance by an Ensemble in a Comedy Series and Outstanding Performance by a Female Actor in a Comedy Series (Aduba). It received a Golden Globe Award nomination for Best Television Series – Musical or Comedy. The series has also received, among other accolades, six Writers Guild of America Award nominations, five Satellite Awards, four Critics' Choice Television Awards, a GLAAD Media Award, an American Cinema Editors Award, a Producers Guild of America Award, and a Peabody Award.

== Broadcast ==
Netflix is famously tight-fisted when it comes to offering up viewership data about its original series. But execs with the streaming giant have repeatedly confirmed that OITNB is its most-watched original series. That has been backed up by the efforts of outside measurement companies to track viewing in the Netflix eco-system.

— Variety

The series began airing on broadcast television in New Zealand, on TV2, on August 19, 2013. It premiered in Australia on October 9, 2013, on Showcase. The second season began on Showcase on July 16, 2014, and the third season premiered on June 11, 2015. The first season began airing on broadcast television in the UK on Sony Channel from April 19, 2017. It has been shown in Ireland on TG4 since January 15, 2018.

=== Cybercriminal hacking ===
In April 2017, it was reported that a cybercriminal had stolen the first ten episodes of season 5, in a security breach of a post-production company. Netflix failed to respond to ransom demands, and the cybercriminal leaked the episodes online. Netflix confirmed the security breach and an ongoing investigation by federal law enforcement. Multichannel News reported that demand for the series significantly increased over the seven-day period following the leak of the episodes. It was also said that the leak would likely cause a decrease in demand for the fifth season when Netflix released it in June 2017.

=== Ratings ===
Orange Is the New Black generated more viewers and hours viewed in its first week than the other top Netflix original series House of Cards and Arrested Development. In October 2013, Netflix stated that the show is a "tremendous success" for the streaming platform. "It will end the year as our most watched original series ever and, as with each of our other previously launched originals, enjoys an audience comparable with successful shows on cable and broadcast TV." As reported in February 2016, Orange Is the New Black remained Netflix's most-watched original series. In 2016, a New York Times study of the 50 TV shows with the most Facebook Likes found that Orange Is the New Black is one of the shows most watched in urban areas, and despite its "minority-rich ensemble cast", the series "appeals more to a white audience".

== See also ==
- Incarceration of women in the United States
- List of dramatic television series with LGBT characters
- Prison–industrial complex
- Prisoner
- Bad Girls
- Wentworth
