= Lin Tucci =

American actress (born 1960)

- Born: Linda Petrucci; February 8, 1960 (age 65); Winthrop, Massachusetts, U.S.
- Occupation: Actress
- Years active: 1995–present
- Website: www.lintucci.com

Lin Tucci (born Linda Petrucci, February 8, 1960) is an American actress. Tucci is known for her performance as Henrietta "Mama" Bazoom in the film Showgirls (1995). She also performed in the number of theater productions, and co-starred in several films.

Tucci became interested in acting while in High School in Rhode Island. She later attended Community College of Rhode Island and Boston Conservatory of Music, where she received a fine arts degree in theater. Afterwards, Tucci moved to New York to pursue a career in acting.

In 2013, Tucci began appearing in a recurring role in the Netflix comedy-drama series, Orange Is the New Black. She plays the role of Anita DeMarco, an outspoken Jersey-Italian inmate.

== Filmography ==
Year	Title	Role	Notes
1995	Showgirls	Henrietta 'Mama' Bazoom	Nominated — Golden Raspberry Award for Worst Supporting Actress
1998	Law & Order	Amy Cardenas	Episode: "Agony"
2001	Nuncrackers	Sr. M. Winifred	
2007	Nunsensations	Filomena	
2007	Brooklyn Rules	Aunt Louise	
2009	How to Seduce Difficult Women	Sheila	
2013–2017, 2019	Orange Is the New Black	Anita DeMarco	Recurring role, 45 episodes Screen Actors Guild Award for Outstanding Performance by an Ensemble in a Comedy Series (2015-2017); Nominated — Screen Actors Guild Award for Outstanding Performance by an Ensemble in a Comedy Series (2018)
2014	Alto	Mrs. Lina Cappelletti	
