= Yael Stone =

Australian actress

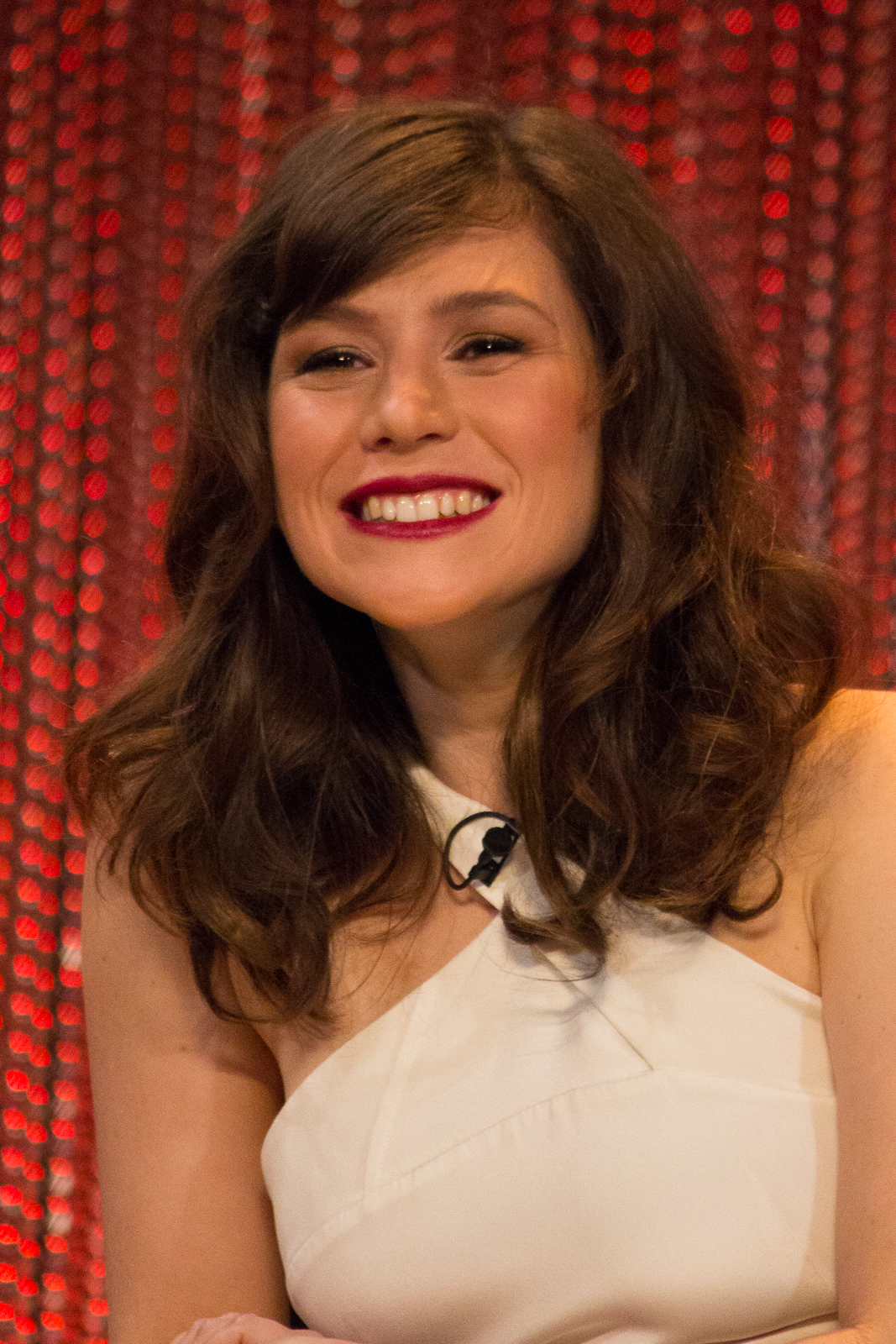
- Stone at PaleyFest 2014, representing Orange Is the New Black
- Born: Sydney, New South Wales, Australia
- Education: National Institute of Dramatic Art (BFA)
- Occupation: Actress
- Years active: 1999–present
- Spouse: Dan Spielman (m. 2012; div. 2016)
- Partner: Jack Manning Bancroft (2017–present)
- Children: 2
- Relatives: Elana Stone (sister)

Yael Stone is an Australian actress. She has worked extensively in Australian theatre and has won two Sydney Theatre Awards. On screen, she is best known for her portrayal of Lorna Morello in the Netflix series Orange Is the New Black.

== Early life and education ==
Yael Stone was born and raised in Sydney, New South Wales, the daughter of Judy, a nurse, and Harry Stone, an architect. Her father was born in Czechoslovakia, to Holocaust survivor parents. Stone's father is from a Jewish family and her mother, who is of Romanian descent, converted to Judaism. Her brother, Jake Stone, was the lead singer of the band Bluejuice. Her sister, Elana Stone, is also a musician.

She was a sickly child, spending periods in hospital with asthma and pneumonia, so did not participate in sport. She took speech and drama lessons with a local woman, Robin Fraser, who encouraged her to develop her skills in performing and writing.

Stone attended the Newtown High School of the Performing Arts and then the National Institute of Dramatic Art (NIDA).

== Career ==
Stone began acting as a child, with roles in the film Me Myself I and the miniseries The Farm.

She then worked primarily in theatre. At the 2008 Sydney Theatre Awards, she won the awards for Best Newcomer and Best Supporting Actress for her performance in The Kid. From 2010 to 2011, she appeared in The Diary of a Madman (a theatrical adaptation of the Gogol short story), a role for which she was again nominated for Best Supporting Actress at the Sydney Theatre Awards. In February 2011, she travelled to New York City to perform in the Brooklyn Academy of Music's production of The Diary of a Madman, before returning to lead roles in A Golem Story, Summer of the Seventeenth Doll, and As You Like It in Sydney.

She also worked in television, including supporting roles in All Saints and Spirited.

Stone moved to New York permanently in December 2011 and co-founded an experimental theatre company. After four months in New York, she was cast in the Netflix series Orange Is the New Black, a show set in a women's prison. Stone played Lorna Morello, a prisoner from Boston; her accent, a mixture of Brooklyn and Boston, was called "the most amazing accent on television" by a journalist for The New Republic, while another reviewer deemed the role to be Stone's "breakout turn". She reprised her role in the show's second season, and was billed as a series regular in the third season.

Stone appeared as dog walker Beth in the HBO and web series High Maintenance in 2016. In 2021, she played Eleona, a barmaid with a mysterious past, in the AMC+ series Firebite, an Indigenous Australian vampire horror comedy series created by Warwick Thornton and Brendan Fletcher.

Stone played British journalist Kate Peyton in a series of flashbacks in the 2024 Australian film The Correspondent, directed by Kriv Stenders, opposite Richard Roxburgh, who portrayed Australian journalist Peter Greste.

== Personal life ==
Stone is an atheist.

In 2012, she married Australian actor Dan Spielman and the couple moved to New York. Stone announced that her marriage had ended in 2016.

Stone started dating Jack Manning Bancroft, founder of Australian Indigenous Mentoring Experience. Their first child was born in 2018, and a second child followed in 2022.

On 16 December 2018, The New York Times published an interview with Stone in which she accused Australian actor Geoffrey Rush of sexual misconduct during the production of The Diary of a Madman in 2010 and 2011, including inappropriate texts and unwanted touching. Rush responded in a statement to the Times through his attorneys.

On 7 January 2020, midway through the 2019-2020 Australian bushfire season, Stone announced her intention to give up her US green card and return to live permanently in Australia and become involved in the "climate war".

== Filmography ==
=== Films ===
| Year | Title | Role | Notes |
|---|---|---|---|
| 2011 | Jailbirds | Lucy | Short film |
| 2017 | The Wilde Wedding | Clementine | |
| 2022 | Blacklight | Helen Davidson | |
| 2022 | Blaze | Hannah | |
| 2024 | The Correspondent | Kate Peyton | |

=== Television ===
| Year | Title | Role | Notes |
|---|---|---|---|
| 2007–2008 | All Saints | Ann-Maree Preston | TV series, 14 episodes |
| 2010–2011 | Spirited | Linda | TV series, 13 episodes |
| 2013–2019 | Orange Is the New Black | Lorna Morello | TV series, 56 episodes Screen Actors Guild Award for Outstanding Performance by an Ensemble in a Comedy Series |
| 2015 | Childhood's End | Peretta Jones | Miniseries |
| 2015–2018 | High Maintenance | Beth | TV series, 5 episodes |
| 2016 | Deep Water | Tori Lustigman | Miniseries, 4 episodes |
| 2017 | Penn Zero: Part-Time Hero | General Bighorn (voice) | Animated TV series, 1 episode |
| 2018 | Picnic at Hanging Rock | Dora Lumley | Miniseries, 6 episodes |
| 2021 | Firebite | Eleona | TV series |
| 2023 | Wellmania | Philomena | TV series |
| 2023 | Bay of Fires | Robin | TV series |
| 2023 | One Night | Hat | TV series |
