= Boomkat discography =

- Studio albums: 2
- Extended plays: 1
- Singles: 5
- Music videos: 7
- B-sides: 3
- Collaborations: 1

American electronic/pop band Boomkat have released two studio albums, one extended play, five singles and five music videos on DreamWorks Records and Little Vanilla Records. Boomkat's debut studio album Boomkatalog.One (2003) was considered a commercial success. Their second studio album A Million Trillion Stars was released in March 2009.

== Studio albums ==
List of studio albums, with selected details and chart positions
Title	Details	Peak chart positions		
Title	Details	US	AUS	NZ
Boomkatalog.One	Released: March 18, 2003; Label: DreamWorks	88	96	43
A Million Trillion Stars	Released: March 10, 2009; Label: Little Vanilla	—	—	—

== Extended plays ==
Extended play
Title	Year
Runaway EP	2008

== Singles ==
List of singles, with selected chart positions
Title	Year	Peak chart positions									Album
Title	Year	US	US Dance	AUS	AUT	GER	NZ	SWE	SWI	UK	Album
"The Wreckoning"	2003	88	1	16	46	78	13	25	40	37	Boomkatalog.One
"What U Do 2 Me"	2003	—	1	56	—	—	—	—	—	—	Boomkatalog.One
"Run Away"	2008	—	—	—	—	—	—	—	—	—	Runaway EP
"Run Boy"	2009	—	—	—	—	—	—	—	—	—	A Million Trillion Stars
"Stomp"	2009	—	—	—	—	—	—	—	—	—	A Million Trillion Stars
"Lonely Child"	2010	—	—	—	—	—	—	—	—	—	A Million Trillion Stars

== Music videos ==
List of music videos
Title	Year	Director
"The Wreckoning"	2003	Marc Klasfeld
"What U Do 2 Me"	2003	N/A
"Run Away"	2008	Matthew Wilder
"Run Boy"	2009	Hannah Lux Davis
"Stomp"	2009	Cline Mayo
"Don't Be So Shy"	2009	N/A
"Lonely Child"	2009	Justin Coloma

== Soundtracks ==
Music from the Major Motion Picture Crossroads

- Released: February 1, 2002
- Format: CD
- Label: Jive Records
- Tracks: "Crazy Love"

8 Mile soundtrack

- Released: October 29, 2002
- Format: CD
- Label: Shady, Interscope, UMG Soundtracks
- Tracks: "Wasting My Time"

The Italian Job (Original Motion Picture Soundtrack)

- Released: October 7, 2003
- Format: CD
- Tracks: "The Wreckoning"

Mean Girls Soundtrack

- Released: September 21, 2004
- Format: CD
- Label: Rykodisc
- Tracks: "Rip Her to Shreds" (Blondie cover)

Loving Annabelle Soundtrack

- Released: 2006
- Format: CD
- Tracks: "Lonely Child"

Weirdsville Soundtrack

- Released: November 27, 2007
- Format: CD
- Label: Lakeshore Records
- Tracks: "It's Not My Fault", "It's Not My Fault (Acoustic Version)"
