= Megan Duffy (actress) =

American actress

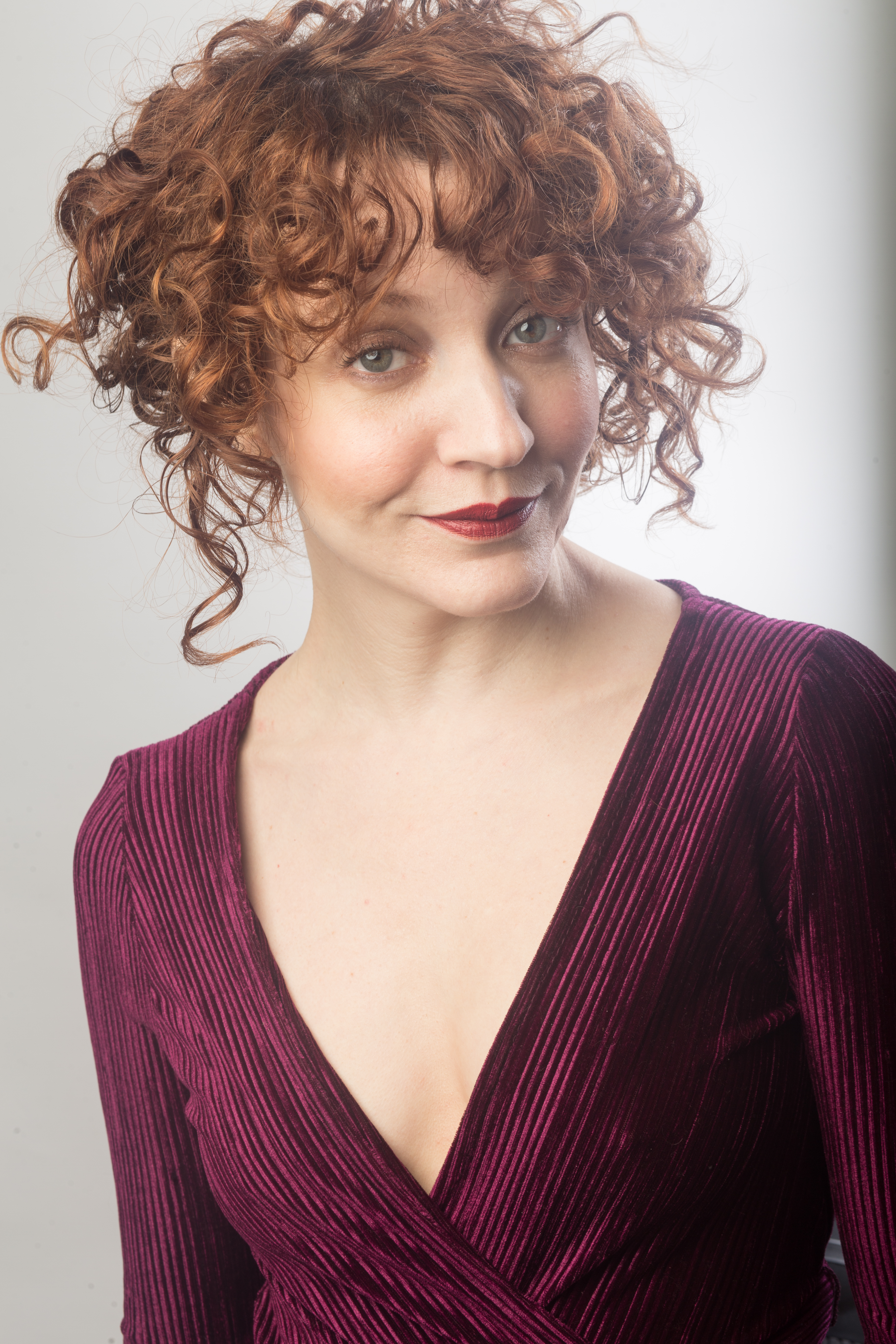
- Born: August 22, 1979 (age 46); Springfield, Massachusetts, United States
- Occupations: Actress, director

Megan Duffy (born August 22, 1979) is an American actress and producer based in Los Angeles, California.

== Biography ==
Megan Duffy was born in Springfield, Massachusetts and was raised in Enfield, Connecticut. She spent her youth and teen years studying dance, winning a scholarship to Broadway Dance Center at age 14. When an injury kept her from further pursuing dance, she relocated to Los Angeles, where she now works as a print model, actress, producer and director.

As an actress, Duffy has appeared in several national commercials and television series, including Torchwood: Miracle Day, Mad Men, Criminal Minds, Gilmore Girls, and The Affair. Megan has also appeared in music videos for Regina Spektor, Travis, Robert Randolph and the Family Band and My Chemical Romance, as well as over 50 national commercials. She plays Lucie in the feature film Maniac and is a lead cast member of the horror comedy role playing podcast Fear Initiative.

== Filmography ==
=== Film ===
Year	Title	Role	Notes
2004	Purgatory House	Purgatory House Kid	
2005	Little Athens	Barnes' Girlfriend	
2008	Your Name Here	Spokesgirl	
2012	Maniac	Lucie	
2014	Camp Takota	Manda	
2015	Fun Size Horror: Volume Two	Melissa	Segment: "Pinned"
2016	Holidays	Mandy	Segment: "New Year's Eve"
2016	Monsterland	Marie Somers	
2017	This Is Our Christmas	Nina	
2018	Seeing Green	Tabby	
2018	All the Creatures Were Stirring	Suzy	
2020	The Reenactment	Jane	

=== Television ===
Year	Title	Role	Notes
2004	Gilmore Girls	Girl	Episode: "Afterboom"
2007	Mad Men	Poetry Girl	Episode: "Babylon"
2009	Galactic Bowling	Kendra Klien	Video game; voice role
2010	Criminal Minds	Cindy Amundson	Episode: "The Uncanny Valley"
2010	How I Met Your Mother	Susan	Episode: "The Wedding Bride"
2011	Torchwood	Claire	Episode: "Miracle Day: End of the Road"
2011	The Family Curse	Jesabel Ellis	
2014	School of Ballet	Lila Jackson	TV film
2014	Dating Pains	Piper	Episode: "Cat-astrophe"
2016	Kings of Con	The Q&A Fan	Episode: "Pasadena, CA"
2019	The Affair	Erica	Episodes 502–504

== Videography ==
=== As producer ===
- "Turn It Up" for Taryn Manning
- "Fight For You" for Morgan Page
- "Lonely Child" for Boomkat
- "It's Only Natural" for The Higher
- "G.L.O.W." for Smashing Pumpkins
- "Run Boy" for Boomkat
- "Healer" for Torche
- "Across the Shields" for Torche
- "Dead Between the Walls" for Pelican (band)
- "By All Means" for National Product
- "Runaway" for Boomkat

=== As director ===
- "Hello" for Gabrielle Wortman
- "Low" for Smoke Season
- "9 to 5" for Allie Goertz
- "Monsters Trick or Treat" for Sean Keller
