= Morris Ruskin =

American film producer

- Born: 1962 (age 63–64); United States
- Occupations: Film producer, CEO
- Spouse: Karna Ruskin

Morris Ruskin is an American independent film and television producer and founder and chairman of Shoreline Entertainment, an international sales agency. He is also the co-founder of MoJo Global Arts, a production and management company.

== Biography ==
Ruskin was born in South Africa to anti-Apartheid parents. At the age of 9, his family moved to Boston where his father went to Harvard Business School; at the age of 12, his family moved to Bermuda; and at the age of 15 they moved to Los Angeles where his mother attended and obtained a Ph.D. at UCLA School of Theater. She did her dissertation on South African playwright Athol Fugard and when Morris produced an adaptation of Fugard's "Master Harold"...and the Boys, he dedicated the movie to his mother.

Since the early 1990s, Ruskin has produced a number of critically acclaimed films including Glengarry Glen Ross, The Man From Elysian Fields, Lakeboat, Price of Glory, Marilyn Hotchkiss' Ballroom Dancing and Charm School, The Visit and Ladies in Black.

In 1992 Morris established Shoreline Entertainment to continue producing his own films and to help secure financing and distribution for other independent productions, structuring deals that incorporate deferments, soft money, and international co-productions in order to create financially viable motion pictures. Through Shoreline, Morris has brought multiple, award-winning Latin films to the market, such as La Nana, 7 cajas, Zona Sur, Contracorriente, Todos Tus Muertos, Father's Chair, just to name a few.

Morris has produced approximately seventy films including titles that have led to Academy Award and Spirit Award nominations, Sundance bidding wars, and premieres at almost every top-tier international film festival. In 2022 and 2023, Morris had films that he produced released on Starz, Peacock, AMC+, and CNN and he had films released theatrically through Lionsgate and Goldwyn. He also had a film at the Toronto International Film Festival.

In January 2024, Morris started production on the TV series Murder in a Small Town for which he is executive producing for Fox and ITV. He just finished a documentary about Shari Lewis directed by Lisa D'Apolito (Love Gilda) and is in post on a documentary about Gene Wilder directed by Chris Smith (Fyre, Jim & Andy: The Great Beyond). He is currently in pre-production on a feature film he is producing titled R.U.R., being directed by Alex Proyas (I Robot, The Crow).

== Personal life ==
Ruskin is married to Karna Ruskin, who is the highly esteemed fashion designer for Emerald Sundae. His sister, Susan Ruskin, is the Dean and Executive VP of AFI Conservatory.

== Partial filmography ==
- Glengarry Glen Ross
- Price of Glory
- Lakeboat
- The Visit
- The Man from Elysian Fields
- Dark Corners
- Marilyn Hotchkiss' Ballroom Dancing and Charm School
- Everything's Gone Green
- Weirdsville
- The Signal
- The Fifth Patient
- Ladies in Black
- Hank and Mike
- Senseless
- High Life
- Master Harold...and the Boys
- Pablo
- A Farewell to Fools
- Bloody Good Time
- Alex & Eve
- Melocotones
- The Swearing Jar
- Night of the Hunted
- Shari and Lamb Chop
- Murder in a Small Town

== Press ==
- South African Oscar submission ‘Knuckle City’ finds US home (exclusive)
- The Independent Filmmaker's Guide to the New Hollywood: Success in the Era of Netflix and Streaming Video (Foreword)
- The Independent Filmmaker's Guide to Writing a Business Plan for Investors, 2d ed. (Foreword)
- MoJo Global Arts, 2btube, Touche, Strike Strategic Alliance
- Shoreline Entertainment Launches Latino Division
- Shoreline Becomes Latin American Talent & Literary Manager
- Shoreline Entertainment: A Discussion with Founder and Head Morris Ruskin

https://variety.com/2023/tv/global/edward-james-olmos-morris-ruskin-2blatam-youtube-mortal-glitch-1235588433/ https://www.joblo.com/night-of-the-hunted-trailer/ https://www.showbizjunkies.com/tv/murder-in-a-small-town-crime-drama/ https://variety.com/2024/tv/news/fox-murder-in-a-small-town-cast-james-cromwell-stana-katic-1235945834/
