= The Wreckoning =

The Wreckoning may refer to:

- The Wreckoning (album), a 2012 album by Willam Belli
- "The Wreckoning" (song), a 2003 song by Boomkat
- The Wreckoning, the debut 2009 album by southern rock band Trainwreck.
