= Panasonic (disambiguation) =

Panasonic is a Japanese multinational electronics corporation.

Panasonic may also refer to:

- Panasonic (cycling team), a Dutch road-racing team 1984–1992
- Pan Sonic, an electronic music group from Finland known as Panasonic
- Your Name Here, a 2008 American surreal dramatic fantasy film formerly known as Panasonic
