= Send Me Your Love =

Send Me Your Love may refer to:

- Send Me Your Love (album), a 1984 album by Kashif, or the title song
- "Send Me Your Love" (song), a 2012 song by Taryn Manning
- "Send Me Your Love", a song by Badfinger, from the 1979 album Airwaves
- "Send Me Your Love", a 2016 EP by Mia Wray

== See also ==
- "Sending Me Ur Loving", a 2020 song by the Jungle Giants
