= The Devil's Tomb =

- DVD cover
- Directed by: Jason Connery
- Written by: Keith Kjornes
- Produced by: Steve B. Harris; Bill Sheinberg; Jonathan Sheinberg; Sid Sheinberg
- Starring: Cuba Gooding Jr. Taryn Manning; Henry Rollins; Valerie Cruz; Bill Moseley; Ray Winstone; Ron Perlman
- Cinematography: Thomas L. Callaway
- Edited by: Chris Conlee; Adam Doench
- Music by: Bill Brown
- Production companies: Ice Cold Productions; Empyreal Entertainment; Ringleader Studios; The Bubble Factory
- Distributed by: Sony Pictures Home Entertainment
- Release date: May 26, 2009
- Running time: 90 minutes
- Country: United States
- Language: English
- Budget: $10 million

The Devil's Tomb is a 2009 American horror film, directed by Jason Connery. It stars Cuba Gooding Jr., Ray Winstone and Ron Perlman. The film was released direct–to–video on May 26, 2009.

== Plot ==
An elite group of Special Ops soldiers, led by Captain "Mack", are sent by Dr. Elissa Cardell, a CIA operative, to rescue her father, scientist Lee Wesley, from an archaeological dig in the Middle Eastern desert. The dig site was a suspected bunker for WMDs. After entering the dig site, they encounter a priest who has strange boils all over his body. The team's medic, Sarah "Doc" Harrington, sedates him. I.T. Specialist and former hacker "Click"" activates the site's elevator and notices a reference to the "Gehenna Project", which Cardell denies knowledge of. Mack orders communications specialist Nickels to stay on the surface and fix the broken communications gear and watch the priest, while the rest of the team descends on the elevator.

Underground, the team encounters Duncan, a scientist with boils like the priest's, who attacks the team by spitting acidic goo but is shot in the chest. While treating Duncan's wound, Doc has a hallucination of her sister, who blames Doc for letting her die. Duncan and Doc disappear and the team splits up to find them. Suffering hallucinations along the way, they find Duncan trying to open a sealed room, before attacking them and forcing the team to shoot him dead. The room is opened from the inside by Father Fulton, a priest that Cardell knows, who tells them that Doc has probably been taken to "the temple." While guiding them there, Fulton attacks Nickels, subdues him with the same acidic goo, and drags him away.

On the upper floor, Click finds Doc locked in a room; trying to get her out, he is attacked by a possessed scientist. Hammer appears and rescues Click, but more possessed humans start to appear, forcing Hammer to collapse the passage with explosives.

Below, the team learns from Fulton and Cardell that the temple is one of many tombs created by God to imprison the malevolent Nephilim, but the site's inhabitant has the ability to possess the scientists and now the team.

Separated from the team, Yoshi follows a hallucination to a now-possessed Doc, who seduces and then possesses her. Doc then attacks Hammer, but Hicks fires his gun at Hammer to prevent him from shooting Doc, driving Hammer away. Hicks is then killed by Yoshi and Doc.

Hammer arrives back at the temple to tell Mack what he saw. Fulton reveals that the "Gehenna Project" is a self-destruct protocol for the site, and realizes that, with Click's unintentional help, Cardell has activated it, leaving the soldiers only fifteen minutes to evacuate. The door to the temple begins to close automatically. Fulton, Mack, Cardell, and Click make it out, but Hammer is trapped inside and sets off his grenades, killing himself and most of the possessed scientists attacking him. Fulton runs to the elevator alone but is killed by Doc.

Mack, Cardell, and Click arrive at the area where they encountered Duncan and finally find Wesley, who is possessed but without the tell-tale boils. Doc and the now-possessed Nickels attack the remaining members of the team. Click is killed, but Mack shoots an explosive barrel, killing Doc and disabling Wesley. Cardell stands over Wesley and sets his soul free by taking the Nephilim into herself, then refuses to go with Mack, because saving her father was her only goal.

Mack escapes from the dig site seconds before the explosion and is retrieved by helicopter. Throughout the mission he was tormented by hallucinations of his friend and mentor Blakeney, whom he was ordered to kill years ago. Now he puts those memories to rest and embraces his new purpose in life: as a new soldier in the ancient war between God and the Nephilim.

== Cast ==
- Cuba Gooding Jr. as Captain Mack
- Ray Winstone as Blakeley
- Taryn Manning as Dr. Sarah "Doc" Harrington
- Ron Perlman as Dr. Lee Wesley
- Valerie Cruz as Dr. Elissa Cardell
- Henry Rollins as Father Jacob Fulton
- Bill Moseley as Professor Duncan
- Zack Ward as Nickels
- Dania Ramirez as Shanae
- Franky G as Hammer
- Stephanie Jacobsen as Yoshi
- Brandon Fobbs as Click
- Jason London as Hicks
- Weston Blakesly as Father Jacoby
- Jonathan Fraser as Pilot Chuck
- Rachel Currence as Teenage Girl
- Holly Weber as Nickels' Dreamgirl
- Sarah Ann Morris as Sharon
- Melanie Chapman as Crazy Woman
- Luke Gregory as Obese Tech

== Production ==
Filming began in California from November 2007 to January 2008, on a $10 million budget. The film received an R rating from the MPAA for strong violence/gore, language and brief nudity.

== Home media ==
The DVD was released on May 26, 2009 in United States, distributed by DreamWorks Pictures. The special features included on the disk are a directors commentary, outtakes, a making of documentary, deleted scenes and alternate scenes. As of August 14, 2009, it had sold 159,568 copies and grossed $3,189,764 in sales.

The DVD was released in Australia on December 9, 2009.
