= The Perfect Age of Rock 'n' Roll =

- Directed by: Scott Rosenbaum
- Written by: Scott Rosenbaum
- Screenplay by: Scott Rosenbaum; Jasin Cadic
- Produced by: Joseph White; Neil Carter; Mike Ellis
- Starring: Kevin Zegers; Jason Ritter; Taryn Manning; Lukas Haas; Peter Fonda; Lauren Holly; Kelly Lynch; Aimee Teegarden
- Cinematography: Tom Richmond
- Edited by: Madeleine Gavin
- Music by: Andrew Hollander
- Production company: Red Hawk Films
- Distributed by: Entertainment One
- Release dates: April 2009 (Newport Beach); August 5, 2011 (United States)
- Country: United States
- Language: English

The Perfect Age of Rock 'n' Roll is a music-themed drama film starring Kevin Zegers and Jason Ritter and directed by Scott Rosenbaum. The screenplay was written by Scott Rosenbaum and Jasin Cadic. The film was released on-demand & in limited theatrical release on August 5, 2011.

== Plot ==
According to rock and roll lore, age twenty-seven is a fateful milestone laced with tragic deaths, the 27 Club including Jimi Hendrix, Janis Joplin, Jim Morrison, and Brian Jones, all shooting stars who were felled in their prime by drugs and fame. In this film, childhood friends come face to face with the demons of rock and roll (lust, drugs, and passion) on a cross-country road trip that compels them to face their past, present, and future. Rocker Spyder (Kevin Zegers), whose debut album was a huge hit saw his follow-on album bomb, causing him to retreat to his small hometown and give up. Seven years later, 27-year-old Spyder reconnects with his long-lost best friend and writer of his debut album Eric (Jason Ritter), son of a late great punk rock guitar legend, who has long settled into the sedate life of a suburban middle school music teacher. The reunion forces the two to recall their youthful ambitions and re-examine the choices they've made.

== Cast ==
- Kevin Zegers as Spyder
- Jason Ritter as Eric Genson
- Peter Fonda as August West
- Taryn Manning as Rose Atropos
- Lauren Holly as Liza Genson
- Aimee Teegarden as Annie Genson
- James Ransone as Chip Genson
- Lukas Haas as Clifton Hanger

The film also featured appearances by rocker Billy Morrison and blues musicians Pinetop Perkins, Hubert Sumlin Willie "Big Eyes" Smith, Bob Stroger and Sugar Blue.

== Production ==
Production took place in New Jersey, New York City and Los Angeles.

== Reception ==
The film has an approval rating of 0% on Rotten Tomatoes. It was reported that none of the 14 critics that reviewed the film gave it a positive review, with an average rating of 2.7/10. On Metacritic, the film has a weighted average score of 31 out of 100 based on nine critics, indicating "generally unfavorable" reviews.
