= Smoke Season =

American pop duo

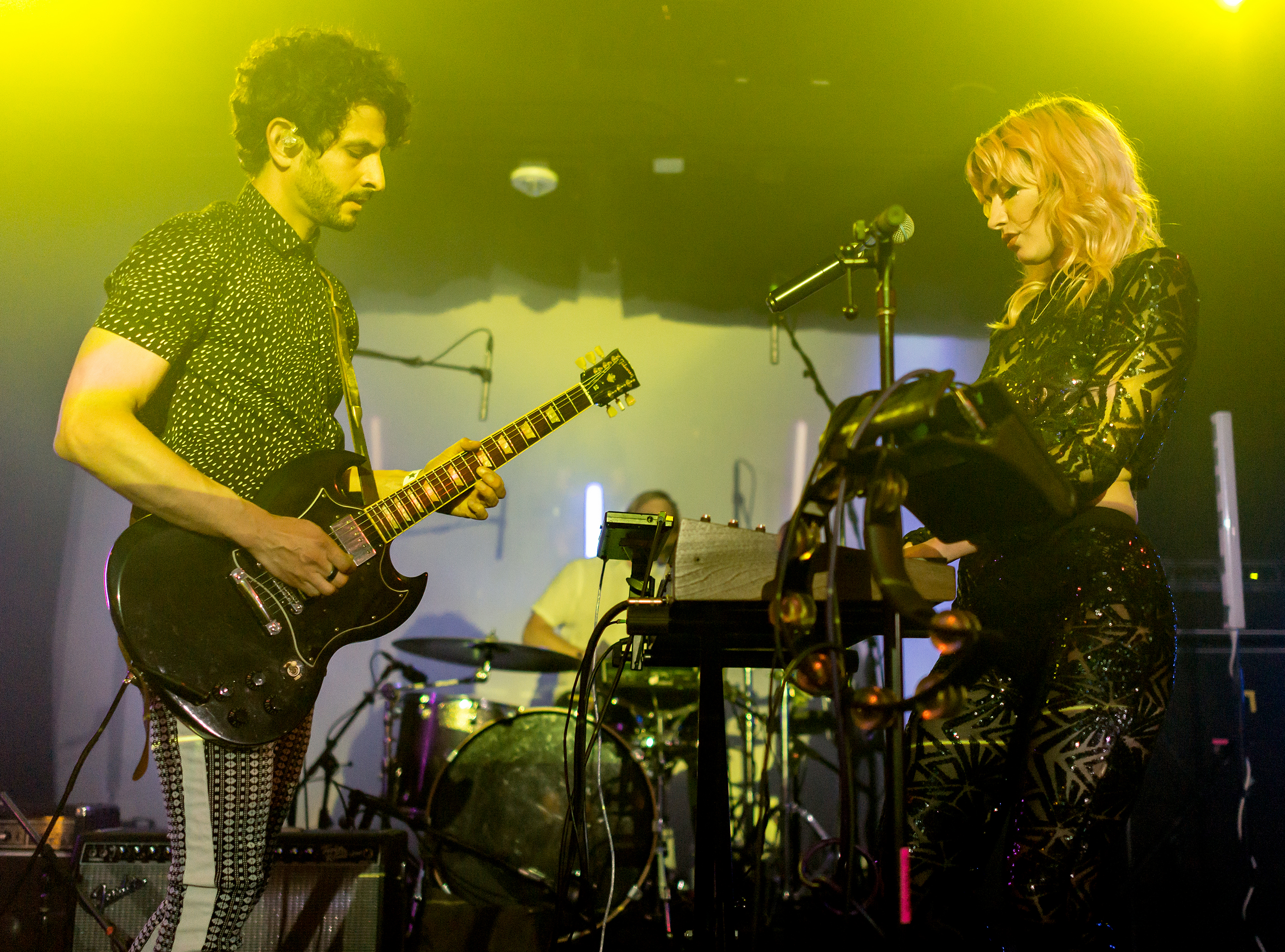
- Smoke Season performing at the Echoplex, Los Angeles in 2017. From left to right: Jason Rosen and Gabrielle Wortman

Background information
- Origin: Los Angeles, California, U.S.
- Genres: Indie pop; electronic
- Years active: 2013–2019 (Note: Smoke Season's most recent projects was released in 2019. As of now, there has been no official confirmation regarding the band's current status, and they have remained inactive on public platforms since their last release.)
- Labels: Independent
- Members: Gabrielle Wortman; Jason Rosen
- Website: smokeseason.com (Archived website)

Smoke Season was an American indie pop duo from Los Angeles, California, formed in 2013 by singer-songwriter Gabrielle Wortman and guitarist Jason Rosen. The duo released their debut extended play (EP) Signals (2013), followed by Hot Coals Cold Souls (2014) and Ouroboros (2016).

== History ==
Gabrielle Wortman and Jason Rosen met in Los Angeles, California in 2012. Both originally from the New York City area, they connected through shared musical influences and a similar East Coast background. At the time, Wortman was leading an electro-pop project called Temp3st, performing regularly in the Los Angeles scene at venues such as the Bootleg Theater.

Meanwhile, Rosen was playing with the pop-rock band Honor Society, which often toured as a supporting act for the Jonas Brothers. After relocating to Los Angeles and spending several years touring across the United States and Canada, Rosen decided to pursue a new musical direction.

In early 2013, shortly after Rosen's departure from Honor Society, Wortman and Rosen collaborated during a rehearsal at their shared studio space. The session produced their debut single, "Soleil", which marked their official beginning as duo.

In 2018, Smoke Season released the single "Sweetest Thing" along with a music video directed by Liz Nistico of Holychild. The video, featuring dancers Candice Fox and Charles Han, the song explored themes of gender and sexual fluidity, while noted by critics as a "slinky indie-pop anthem" with synth and guitar-driven production.

== Musical style ==
Smoke Season has been described as a fusion of electronic, Americana, indie rock, and folk, a style the band has referred to as "ethereal Western soul".

== Members ==
- Gabrielle Wortman – lead vocals, keyboards
- Jason Daniel Rosen – lead guitars, backing vocals

== Discography ==
=== EPs ===
- Signals (2013)
- Hot Coals Cold Souls (2014)
- Ouroboros (2016)

=== Singles ===
- "Soleil" (2013)
- "Bees" (2015)
- "Hello" (2017)
- "Good Days" (2017)
- "Wolves" (2017)
- "Sweetest Thing" (2018)
- "Boys of Summer" (2018)
- "Hot Damn" (2018)
- "Up on Me" (2019)
- "You" (2019)
