= Echoplex (venue) =

Live venue in Los Angeles

Coordinates: 34°4′39″N 118°15′37″W

- Interactive map of Echoplex
- Location: 1154 Glendale Blvd, Los Angeles, California 90026
- Seating type: Standing
- Capacity: 780
- Type: music venue

Website
- www.theecho.com

Echoplex is a live music venue located in the Echo Park neighborhood of Los Angeles, California. It is owned and operated by the same people as the Echo, and the two are considered sister venues. It is located and commonly described as being "below the Echo", leading some to erroneously believe that its official title is "Echoplex Below the Echo". Along with the Echo, Echoplex is affiliated with Spaceland in the Silver Lake neighborhood of Los Angeles.

== Notable acts ==
- Beth Hart
- Green Day
- Joe Bonamassa
- Rolling Stones
- Nine Inch Nails
- The Plugz
- The Weirdos
- Middle Class (band)
- Thom Yorke
- Smoke Season
- Bad Gyal
- Autechre
