= Your Name Here =

- Directed by: Matthew Wilder
- Written by: Matthew Wilder
- Based on: Panasonic by Matthew Wilder
- Produced by: Megan Duffy; Wali Razaqi; Mark Burman; Scott Pearlman; Eric Ricart; Jon D. Wagner
- Starring: Bill Pullman; Taryn Manning; Harold Perrineau; Traci Lords; M. Emmet Walsh; Richard Riehle
- Cinematography: David McFarland
- Edited by: Tanner Stauss
- Music by: Michael Roth
- Production companies: Hypothetical; Raz Entertainment
- Distributed by: Shoreline Entertainment
- Release date: June 13, 2008 (CineVegas)
- Running time: 106 minutes
- Country: United States
- Language: English
- Budget: $350,000

Your Name Here (formerly Panasonic) is a 2008 American surreal dramatic fantasy biopic loosely based on the life of Philip K. Dick. Written and directed by and the feature film directorial debut of Matthew Wilder, it stars Bill Pullman and Taryn Manning in the lead roles.

== Plot ==
During the summer of 1974, science-fiction writer William J. Frick (Bill Pullman) is having a meltdown. Despite having numerous popular titles to his credit, Frick is penniless. His ex-wives and ex-girlfriends are hounding him, and the IRS has sent Agent Duke (Dave Sheridan) to investigate his property and holdings. Bikers are mixing meth in his garage and having drug parties in his home. His final masterpiece, an account of his collision with God in an East L.A. taco stand, is nearly complete and actress Nikki Principal (Taryn Manning) encourages his writing, telling him that it has the power to change the world. However, after an inadvertent dose of a powdery white substance, Frick wakes up to discover himself lost in a series of alternate realities.

== Cast ==
- Bill Pullman as William J. Frick
- Taryn Manning as Nikki Principal
- Traci Lords as Julie Frick
- M. Emmet Walsh as Kroger / Maurice Stanz
- Richard Riehle as Literary Agent Lipschitz
- Dave Sheridan as IRS Agent Duke
- Charles Napier as Chuck Heston
- Harold Perrineau as Richard Roundtree
- Ivana Milicevic as The Blonde
- Adair Tishler as 8 Year Old Laura Hayden Frick
- Mircea Monroe as Black Turtleneck Girl
- Brittany Perrineau as Sinner
- Wali Razaqi as Sinner
- Megan Duffy as Spokesgirl
- Mark Weitala as Davey

== Production ==
Matthew Wilder first wrote the screenplay and cast it under the working name Panasonic (meaning 'all sounds at the same time'), until the title was changed as a result of Panasonic Corporation suing Wilder for trademark infringement. While still being referred to as Panasonic, it was announced in July 2006 that filming would begin the following August. However, filming actually took place in September, captured on Digicam HD during a 15-day period that month in Huntington Park and other Los Angeles locations. The project was in post-production in 2007, with its name changed to Your Name Here. The project premiered June 13, 2008 at the Cinevegas Film Festival, and later screened in Spain at the Sitges - Catalan International Film Festival and in Canada at the Montréal World Film Festival.

== Critical response ==
The reviewer at JoBlo panned the film, writing that it was a "sad sack excuse for a movie didn’t help me start my day on a good foot". He expanded that the film's characters were bland and it never expanded on their backgrounds. It was offered that the film's jumping "in and out of what was obviously NOT a true reality" made it difficult to become invested in the project. It was felt that Traci Lord's character of Frick's foul-mouthed former-wife Julie was funny at first but was overdone to the point of no longer being entertaining. Bill Pullman was praised for bringing his ability to an otherwise stale role of Frick as was Taryn Manning for her work as Nikki, but what ruined the film for the reviewer was it being a "rinse and repeat, go everywhere yet nowhere jamboree of snoozes." The reviewer decried the "low-rent, crappy locations", the film's repeated use of "mind-f*ck clichés", and the overall "sad-sack" cinematography. Variety agreed, writing the film "flubs an opportunity for a full-bore B-movie romp in a series of overextended, flat episodes" by director Matthew Wilder who allowed too many scenes to run overlong. Las Vegas Weekly noted that Pullman's character of Frick looked like Michael Douglas and bemoaned that his "acting is fine, but it’s got no context" while at the same time noting that Traci Lords gives "what is probably her career-best performance as, ironically, a frumpy housewife." They also noted that with its relatively small budget "the production has a curious emptiness to it, as if it were all shot in one abandoned warehouse hastily redressed for each new locale". They concluded the film was a disservice to Philip K. Dick's legacy. The Hollywood Reporter appreciated that Bill Pullman was cast in a role where he was "able to stretch in a vehicle that showcases his unappreciated comic talents", but offered that the film "ultimately proves too impenetrable for its own good."

Conversely, Film Threat granted that while the project was "not for everyone", it reminded "of some odd literary films like Fear and Loathing in Las Vegas and Naked Lunch," and promised viewers that "if you stick with Your Name Here until the end, you will be rewarded. For all its oddities and confusion, the ending come across as very powerful and quite sad." It was appreciated that in the film's extrapolating from events surrounding the life of Philip K. Dick, it acted as an homage both to the man's fiction and to the 1970s. They praised Taryn Manning for showing "some serious acting chops as Nikki and described Bill Pullman's Frick as "simply brilliant. You can almost see the fried wheels in his brain spinning as he, along with we, try to figure out what the heck is going on."

=== Awards and nominations ===
- 2008, won Cinevegas 'Special Jury Prize' for 'Best Performance' for Bill Pullman
- 2008, nominated for 'Grand Prix des Amériques' at Montréal World Film Festival
- 2008, nominated for 'Best Film' at Sitges - Catalan International Film Festival
