= A Million Trillion Stars =

Studio album by Boomkat
- Released: June 3, 2008
- Recorded: 2007–2008
- Genres: Pop; electropop; hip-hop
- Label: Little Vanilla
- Producer: Mike Elizondo

Boomkat chronology
Boomkatalog.One (2003)	A Million Trillion Stars (2008)

Singles from A Million Trillion Stars
- 1. "Run Away" Released: April 2008; 2. "Run Boy" Released: March 2009; 3. "Stomp" Released: July 2009; 4. "Don't Be So Shy" Released: October 2009; 5. "Lonely Child" Released: February 2010

Alternative cover
- Alternative cover

Professional ratings
Review scores
Source	Rating
Melodic.net	2.5/5 stars

A Million Trillion Stars is the second studio album by electronic duo Boomkat. On June 3, 2008, the album became available in online stores, but was officially released on March 10, 2009. The album was originally planned to be released on December 16, 2008, but was pushed back. Tracks from the album were posted on Taryn Manning's MySpace page and iTunes, but the album became fully available on their new website in early June 2008. Two singles, called "Run Away" and "Run Boy" have been released off the album. "Run Away" single appears in the studio album, as well as in the Runaway EP.

Stars are Boomkat's trademark, as "stars" are mentioned in the album title and also seen on the cover. When Manning is performing with her band, she wears stars around her eyes to separate "the actress Taryn from the singer Taryn."

Boomkat's 5th music video from the album premiered on MySpace on Wednesday February 17, 2010. The music video tells a story about Taryn's childhood. "In the video, I have a young girl who has nowhere to go and she’s sort of lost and lonely and sad. We dedicated it to my father who died quite a long ago and there’s pictures of him in it", she explained.

== History ==
The album was produced by Mike Elizondo, whose credits include Pink, Maroon 5, 50 Cent and Rilo Kiley. When creating the album Taryn and Kellin Manning "basically just sit down together, one of us with a guitar or keyboard or him on his computer. We do a lot with Garage Band," Taryn told Pop - Rock Candy Mountain.

"Not My Fault" appeared on the soundtrack of Taryn's 2007 film Weirdsville and "Lonely Child" can be heard in the movie Loving Annabelle. "Lonely Child" is a song about what it’s like to feel alone and confused. "Dressed In Grief" appeared as a new track in the official track listing and some song titles were changed. The album includes two different album covers, an official release cover and a digital version cover. Cline Mayo was the creator of the album artwork. The official Boomkat record release party was held at the Key Club in Hollywood.

== Reception ==
"Boomkat's new attitude definitely shows on their album. As always, Kellin Manning created the beats for each track and Taryn wrote the lyrics for each song. But this album is twice as good as the first. Fans won’t be disappointed. The music style and vibe are edgy and versatile." -Brittney Joseph Kaj Roth of Melodic gave the album three and a half stars out of five. Roth said that "Boomkat sounds a bit like Pink, Gwen Stefani and Nelly Furtado". Roth prefers the pop side of the record more than the hip-hop side.

== Track listing ==
All songs written by Taryn Manning.

1. "Run Boy (Here I Come)" – 3:09
2. "Lonely Child" – 3:55
3. "Stomp" – 3:08
4. "Run Away" – 3:20
5. "Elated" – 4:21
6. "Not My Fault" – 3:30
7. "Four Track Dub" – 4:30
8. "Don't Be So Shy" – 3:35
9. "Instead" – 3:56
10. "Fall On Me" – 3:59
11. "Wish I Could" – 3:55
12. "Burn" – 3:27
13. "Say Hi" – 4:26
14. "Dressed in Grief" – 4:44
