= The Job (2009 film) =

- Directed by: Shem Bitterman
- Written by: Shem Bitterman
- Produced by: Shem Bitterman; Kiki Goshay
- Starring: Patrick Flueger; Taryn Manning; Ron Perlman; Joe Pantoliano
- Cinematography: John Foster
- Edited by: Stephen Mark
- Music by: Enis Rotthoff
- Distributed by: Magnolia Home Entertainment
- Release date: September 26, 2009
- Running time: 107 minutes
- Country: United States
- Language: English

The Job is an independent darkly comic drama written and directed by Shem Bitterman based on his 1998 play. The film world premiered on September 26, 2009, at the San Diego Film Festival where writer Shem Bitterman won a Best Screenplay award.

== Plot ==
A hapless man named Bubba, who is desperate to find a job and marry the woman he loves, is hooked up with a slick employment agent by a drifter. Only after agreeing to the job (a contract kill, no less), Bubba finds himself in over his head.

== Cast ==
- Patrick Flueger as Bubba
- Taryn Manning as Joy
- Ron Perlman as Jim
- Joe Pantoliano as Perriman
- Katie Lowes as Connie

== Production ==
Filming began on 6 May 2008 in Detroit, and ended in July 2008.

== Release ==
After a very brief limited release, the film was released on DVD on 27 July 2010.

The film is available on Amazon. Free to Amazon Prime members.
