= Runaway (Boomkat song) =

Single by Boomkat

from the album A Million Trillion Stars
- B-side: "Burn"
- Released: April 6, 2008 (iTunes)
- Recorded: 2007
- Genre: Pop
- Length: 3:22
- Label: Little Vanilla Records
- Songwriters: Taryn Manning; Kellin Manning
- Producer: Boomkat

Boomkat singles chronology
"What U Do 2 Me" (2003)	"Runaway" (2008)	"Run Boy" (2009)

Music video
- "Runaway" on YouTube

"Runaway", also known as "Run Away", is a pop song and an EP by electronic/pop duo Boomkat. "Runaway" was the first single since their departure from DreamWorks Records, and first to be released under independent label, Little Vanilla Records.

== Song ==
After a break from music, Boomkat released their first single in four years, called "Runaway" on April 8, 2008. The music video premiered on their official YouTube channel, iTunes and Taryn Manning's Myspace page. Blogger Perez Hilton also posted the music video on his website, which made the single more recognized. He described the song "smooth, sexy and a bit autobiographical." The single was introduced in many blogs and was considered a success by fans. The single was very popular amongst its listeners, who described it "addictive, interesting and chill."

Sometimes you just want to run away from life. When you see so clearly but other people are trying to fake it. I'm just like 'Ok, I don't get you and you don't get me so I just need to run away.'

— Taryn Manning, YRB Magazine

=== Music video ===
The music video was directed by Matthew Wilder, who was also the director of Taryn's film Your Name Here. The video starts with Taryn Manning singing at a party in a long black dress. The video pictures a party thrown by Taryn, but she is a phantom at her own party. Next she's running anxiously, even falling one time, but keeps running away. Guests at the party can't see her, because they are involved with themselves and their own conversations. Throughout the music video Taryn sings and whispers song lyrics to the guests. Her brother, Kellin Manning can also been seen in the music video. He is sitting in the stairs wearing a green suit. The music video ends with Taryn sitting by the pool and touching water.

== Extended play ==
Runaway was also released as an extended play with two new songs and one remix version. It was released before their studio album A Million Trillion Stars (2009). The EP has been available on iTunes as of 6 April 2008.

== Track listing ==
iTunes EP

1. "Runaway" - 3:22
2. "Burn (Black Irish Remix)" - 3:18
3. "Runaway (Hammers Remix)" - 5:12
