= Wali Razaqi =

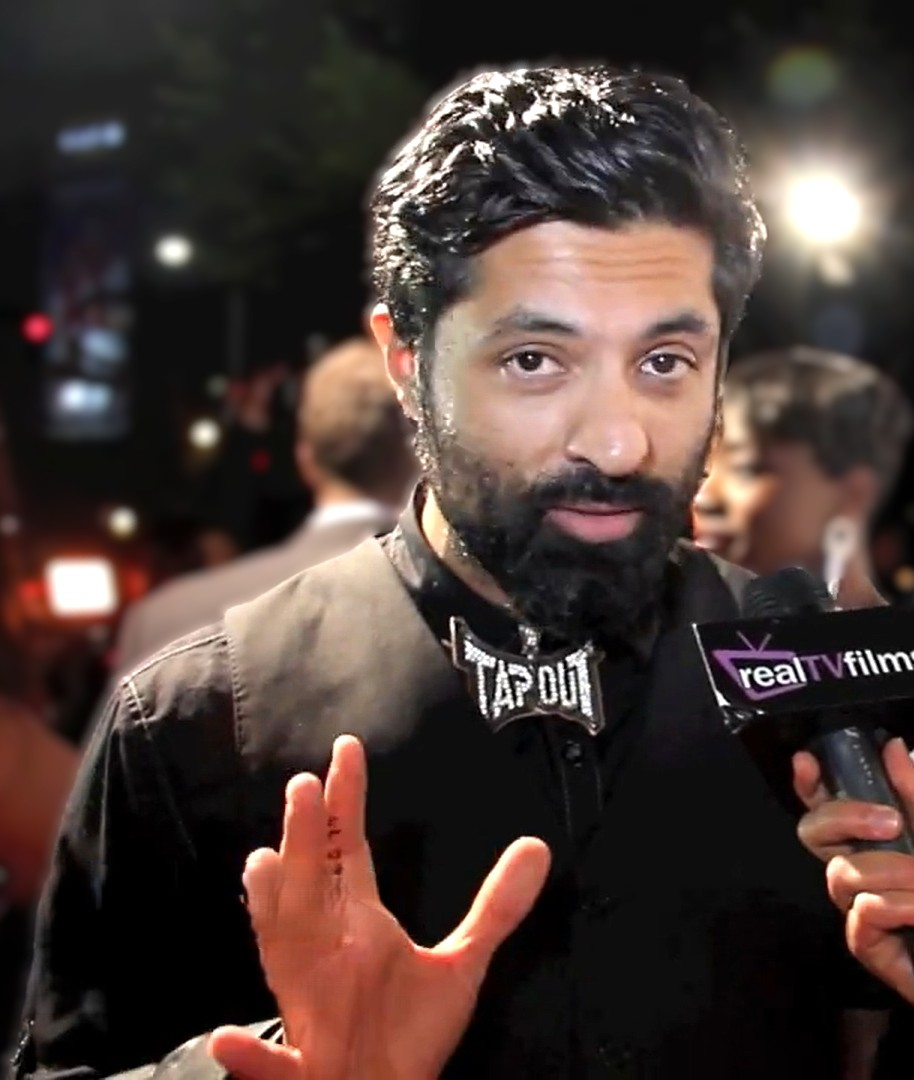
- Razaqi in 2014
- Born: January 25, 1979 (age 46); Kabul, Afghanistan, Afghanistan
- Occupations: Film & tv producer, actor, motivational speaker

Wali Razaqi (born January 25, 1979) is a producer, actor, & motivational speaker. He is the president of TapouT Films in partnership with Dan Caldwell founder of TapouT.

He grew up in Santa Cruz, CA & at age 21, he quit college & football to produce & act in his first feature film In the Wrong Hands (2002). He went on to produce & act in a dozen more feature films including Sundance winner “September Tapes” and “Your Name Here” with Bill Pullman and Traci Lords., Red Sky aka “Kerosene Cowboys” with Mario Van Peebles Cam Gigandet, Rachael Leigh Cook, and Shane West. He is also the creator and executive producer of two TV series: 4th and Long for Spike tv and The Michael Vick Project, a ten-part docu-series on BET.

He is currently finishing his directing debut with the feature documentary Almost Champions as well as appearing on radio & podcasts & speaking at various churches around the country about his unexpected journey from being a life long Muslim to becoming a devout Christian three years ago.
