= Holly Weber =

American glamour model and actress (born 1984)

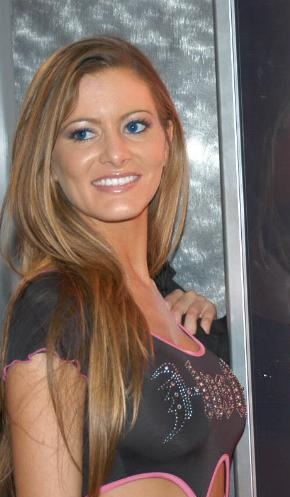
- Weber in 2007
- Born: Holly Beth Weber; September 20, 1984 (age 40); Loma Linda, California, U.S.
- Other names: Hollister (nickname)
- Occupation(s): Model, actress
- Modeling information
- Height: 5 ft 7 in (170 cm)
- Hair color: Brown
- Eye color: Hazel

Holly Weber (born September 20, 1984) is an American glamour model and actress. As a model, she has appeared in magazines such as Maxim, FHM, Muscle & Fitness and Glamour; and in website AskMen's Top 99 Most Desirable Women of 2009. She has made uncredited appearances in a number of movies and TV series.

== Early life ==
Holly Weber was born in Loma Linda, California and spent the majority of her formative years in Southern California. She lived in Costa Rica for three months as a child.

While pursuing an orthodontics degree in college, Weber supported herself by waiting tables at a local restaurant.

== Modeling career ==
Weber was discovered at a nightclub in Las Vegas, and was invited to work as a go-go dancer in Las Vegas and Hollywood. Afterwards she auditioned for various modeling opportunities, and started modeling at the age of 18. She appeared in magazines such as Maxim, FHM, Muscle & Fitness and Glamour.

Weber appeared at no. 66 on AskMen's Top 99 Most Desirable Women of 2009.

== Filmography ==
Aside from her career in modeling, she has appeared in the following movies and TV series:

- Frost/Nixon (2008, uncredited)
- Tropic Thunder (2008, uncredited)
- You Don't Mess with the Zohan (2008, uncredited)
- Criminal Minds (2008, uncredited)
- The Ugly Truth (2009, uncredited)
- Crank: High Voltage (2009, uncredited)
- Fast & Furious (2009, uncredited)
- Miss March (2009, uncredited)
- The Devil's Tomb (2009) as Nickels' Dreamgirl
