= Gabrielle Wortman =

American singer

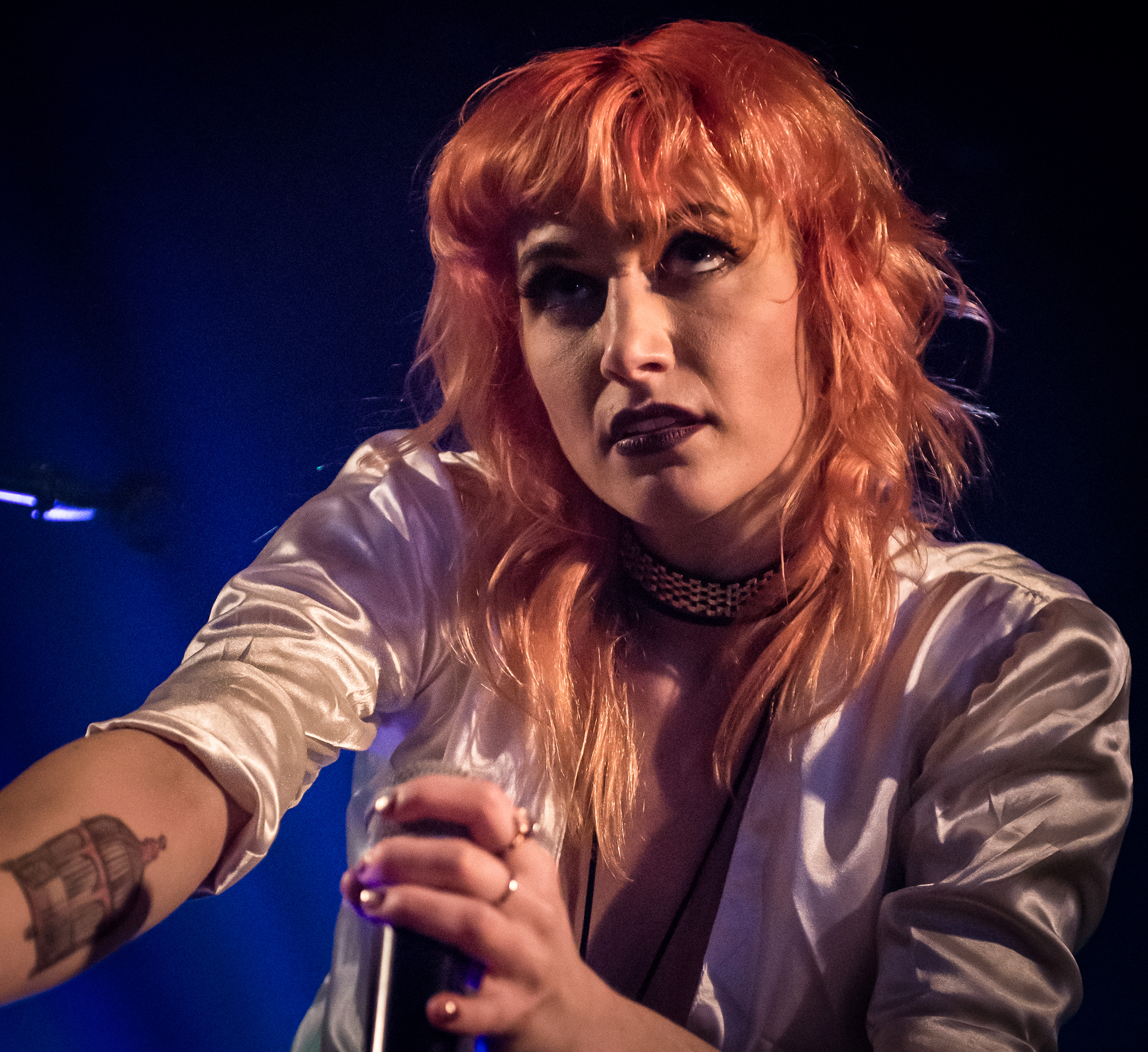
- Wortman in 2017

Background information
- Born: March 25, 1989 (age 36); New York City, U.S.
- Origin: Los Angeles, U.S.
- Genres: Alternative pop; alternative rock; indie; soul
- Occupations: Singer, songwriter, film composer, pianist, guitarist, producer
- Instruments: Piano, guitar, vocals
- Years active: 2011–present

Gabrielle Wortman (born March 25, 1989) is an American alternative rock musician, former lead singer of the band TEMP3ST. Since 2013, they are a member of the band Smoke Season. They are also known by their artist name Biianco.

== Career ==
=== Early years ===
Wortman moved to Los Angeles in 2007 to attend the University of California for a degree in Music Media and Management. While at UCLA, Gabrielle performed in both the 2009 and 2011 UCLA Spring Sing events. Their performance in the Strathmore Players' rendition of Jerry Maguire the Musical in 2009 won them the Bruin's Choice Award as well as the award for Best Production. In 2009, Gabrielle Wortman worked with producer Sejo Navajas to record their first studio album. It was nominated for the Los Angeles Music Awards' AAA Album of the Year category.

On April 13, 2011, they released their second album, The Voodoo EP, on April 13, 2011, which held #1 position on the ReverbNation "What' Hot" Chart for a seven consecutive days. The release earned them a win at the 2011 Malibu Music Awards for "alternative rock song of the year" and 2011 Hollywood Music in Media Awards nominations for both the "Best Alternative Song" and "Best Music Video" categories, making them the only artist to be nominated twice in one year. In 2011, Gabrielle and their touring band performed at Seattle Pridefest, the United States' largest free gay rights festival.

=== The Voodoo EP ===
In 2011, Gabrielle teamed up with Navajas to produce their second studio release, The Voodoo EP. The EP's first single, "Don't Let Me Lose Control", experienced international airplay on terrestrial and internet stations as well as national attention from press. In April 2011, Gabrielle Wortman worked with director Michael Bromberg and producer Nick Horowitz, for their "Don't Let Me Lose Control" music video. The video has subsequently been programmed for Fuse, VH1, and MTV.

Wortman has been performing with their band since 2010. The band's concerts included festivals such as 2011 Seattle Pridefest, 2011 Women of Substance Radio Showcase, and Los Angeles's Hotel Café nightclub.

=== TEMP3ST ===
TEMP3ST is an American indie electronic rock band, consisting of Gabrielle Wortman, Christopher Roberts and George Madrid. The band formed in May 2012 after a three-year collaboration between Christopher Roberts and Gabrielle Wortman's during their solo career. Gabrielle Wortman was named 2012 Sundance Film Festival's "Next Big Thing" on Park City TV. TEMP3ST independently released their debut EP, i am tempest, under the TEMP3ST band name on June 10, 2012.

=== Smoke Season ===
In 2013, Gabrielle Wortman and Jason Rosen, former keyboardist of Honor Society, formed the alt-folk project Smoke Season.

=== Biianco ===
In 2019, Gabrielle launched their new solo music project Biianco. They have released two albums under this name, a LP titled "Mixtape #2" and an EP titled "Mixtape #3".

== Discography ==
- The Secret Life of Gabby (2006)
- Home Is Where the Art Is (2009)
- The Voodoo EP (2011)
- i am tempest. (2012) (released as TEMP3ST)
- Signals EP (2013) (released as Smoke Season)
- Mixtape #2 (2021) (released as Biianco)
- Mixtape #3 (2023) (released as Biianco)

== Personal life ==
In 2021, Gabrielle came out as non-binary and pansexual.

== Reviews ==
Gabrielle Wortman has been most noted by critics for their unique moody, dark, and soulful style. Their style combines a distinct southern soul and an urban vibe.

Wortman is most noted for their unique songwriting style and original singing voice, and has been described as falling "under the electro umbrella, but Wortman abandons the sugar tart vocals of Melody’s Echo Chamber or Chromatics for the swagger of Chaka Khan and the mournful R&B bravado of Adele".
