= Shoreline Entertainment =

American independent film production company

- Type: Film production, film sales
- Founded: 1992
- Founder: Morris Ruskin
- Headquarters: Beverly Hills, California, United States

Shoreline Entertainment is an independent film production company and international sales agency that was founded in 1992 by CEO and film producer Morris Ruskin.

== Partial filmography ==
- Sir Billi
- The American Side
- 7 Boxes
- The Man from Elysian Fields
- Lakeboat
- Price of Glory
- Marilyn Hotchkiss' Ballroom Dancing and Charm School
- The Visit
- The Signal
- Time Lapse (2001)
- Undertow
- Weirdsville
- Everything's Gone Green
- Geography Club
- A Place in the Caribbean
- An Innocent Kiss
- I Hear the Trees Whispering (2022)
