= Run Boy =

Single by Boomkat
- Released: March 3, 2008
- Recorded: 2008
- Genre: Electropop, hip hop
- Length: 4:03
- Label: Little Vanilla Records
- Songwriter(s): Taryn Manning

Boomkat singles chronology
"Runaway" (2008)	"Run Boy" (2008)

Music video
- "Run Boy" on YouTube

"Run Boy" is a free download single by electronic duo Boomkat, as well as the lead single from A Million Trillion Stars (2009).

== Release ==
A music video for "Run Boy" was shot in the summer of 2008 in Los Angeles. The lead single, along with a visually electric music video premiered on People.com on March 3, 2009, and received generally positive reviews. The music video was produced by Megan Duffy and directed by Hannah Lux Davis. The director of photography was Brett Pawlak. The album is influenced by hip-hop of the late-80s/early-90s, the British pop invasion, new wave, and contemporary artists from Motown to the hiperati.

"I know the video is not for everyone but I want ‘the kids’ to like my music," Taryn writes on the duo's blog at MySpace. A dance cut version of the music video was also released and it showed all the dance moves used in the video. It was also noted that all the designs in the video are from Taryn Manning and Tara Jane's clothing line Born Uniqorn.
