= The Man from Elysian Fields =

2001 film by George Hickenlooper

- Directed by: George Hickenlooper
- Written by: Phillip Jayson Lasker
- Produced by: Andy García; David Kronemeyer; Andrew Pfeffer; Donald Zuckerman
- Starring: Andy García; Mick Jagger; Olivia Williams; Julianna Margulies; Michael Des Barres; James Coburn
- Cinematography: Kramer Morgenthau
- Edited by: Michael Brown
- Music by: Anthony Marinelli
- Production companies: Fireworks Pictures; Gold Circle Films; Shoreline Entertainment
- Distributed by: Samuel Goldwyn Films
- Release dates: September 13, 2001 (Toronto International Film Festival); September 27, 2002
- Running time: 106 minutes
- Country: United States
- Language: English
- Box office: $2 million

The Man from Elysian Fields is a 2001 American drama film directed by George Hickenlooper, and starring Andy Garcia, Mick Jagger, Olivia Williams, Julianna Margulies, and James Coburn.

== Synopsis ==
After one book ending in the remainder bins, novelist Byron Tiller's inability to pay the bills strains relations with his wife. Desperate for any income, he meets Luther Fox, an Englishman who runs an exclusive escort service called Elysian Fields and is offered a job.

Hiding his new employment from his wife, Byron finds that one of his clients, Andrea, is married to a much older, ill Pulitzer Prize-winning author whom Tiller dramatically admires. Complications develop as he develops a relationship with the author, essentially co-writing his latest book. Tiller faces new challenges as he tries to separate a professional obligation to the wife and his client from a professional interest and responsibility to a fellow writer and her spouse.

== Cast ==
- Andy Garcia as Byron Tiller
- Mick Jagger as Luther Fox
- Julianna Margulies as Dena Tiller
- Olivia Williams as Andrea Alcott
- James Coburn as Tobias Alcott
- Anjelica Huston as Jennifer Adler
- Michael Des Barres as Nigel Halsey
- Richard Bradford as Edward Rodgers

== Reception ==
On review aggregation website Rotten Tomatoes the film had a rating of 51% based on 70 reviews, with an average of 5.9/10. The site's consensus states: "Critics Consensus: This story about a gigolo isn't plausible or compelling enough." On Metacritic it has a score of 57 based on reviews from 26 critics, indicating "mixed or average reviews".

It was hailed as "One of the Best Films of 2002" by critic Roger Ebert. In a 2020 retrospective, The Guardian's Zach Vasquez praised Jagger's acting, considering it "one of his best performances" while otherwise calling the film "one of the worst movies Jagger has appeared in". Vasquez found Jagger's "sensitive, wounded performance" so "surprisingly effective" that "one has to assume he dug deep into his own history of promiscuity and heartbreak."
