= Price of Glory =

- DVD cover
- Directed by: Carlos Ávila
- Written by: Phil Berger
- Produced by: Arthur Friedman; Moctesuma Esparza
- Starring: Jimmy Smits; Maria del Mar; Jon Seda; Clifton Collins Jr.; Ernesto Hernandez; Ron Perlman; Louis Mandylor
- Cinematography: Affonso Beato
- Edited by: Gary Karr
- Music by: Joseph Julián González
- Production company: Shoreline Entertainment
- Distributed by: New Line Cinema
- Release date: March 31, 2000
- Running time: 118 minutes
- Country: United States
- Language: English
- Budget: $18 million
- Box office: $3.5 million

Price of Glory is a 2000 American sports drama film directed by Carlos Avila, written by Phil Berger and starring Jimmy Smits. The movie was nominated for several ALMA Awards in 2001. The film was shot in Huntington Park, Los Angeles, and Nogales, Arizona. The film was released by New Line Cinema on March 31, 2000.

== Plot ==
Arturo Ortega is a man with enduring aspirations of being a competitor in professional boxing. Arturo had the intellect, ambition, and agility to be a professional, but his career proved to be a short one. After a living out his fifteen minutes of fame, he’s washed up. However, Arturo has instilled his passion for boxing in his three sons, who have grown up learning all about the world of prizefighting. The three boys begin competing in the ring, with Arturo as their manager and coach, but Johnny swiftly displays so much promise that other managers and promoters want to take over his contract and put make him the next boxing champion. Arturo feels let down when Sonny decides that he wants to work with another manager, while his other two sons rail against Sonny for turning his back on his father and hope Arturo has the same conviction in their talents in the ring.

== Cast ==
- Jimmy Smits as Arturo Ortega
- Maria del Mar as Rita Ortega
- Jon Seda as Sonny Ortega
  - Ulises Cuadra as Young Sonny Ortega
- Clifton Collins Jr. as Jimmy Ortega
  - Mario Esquivel as Young Jimmy Ortega
- Ernesto Hernandez as Johnny Ortega
  - Gilbert Leal as Young Johnny Ortega
- Ron Perlman as Nick Everson
- Louis Mandylor as Davey Lane
- Sal Lopez as Hector Salmon
- Danielle Camastra as Mariella Cruz
- John Capodice as Priest
- Paul Rodriguez as Pepe
- Jeff Langton as Referee

== Box office ==
The film grossed $3,440,228 in the United States and $108,328 in the foreign markets.

== Critical reception ==
The film received negative reviews from critics. On the review aggregator website Rotten Tomatoes, 34% of 59 critics' reviews are positive. The website's consensus reads: "Weak script and predictable story undermines the intensity of the film." Metacritic, which uses a weighted average, assigned the film a score of 32 out of 100, based on 25 critics, indicating "generally unfavorable" reviews.

Film critic Roger Ebert gave the film a rating of two stars out of a possible four saying, "The film made me feel like I was sitting in McDonald's watching some guy shout at his kids." Marc Savlov of the Austin Chronicle said of the film "It is a TKO before it even had a chance to get off a decent hook."

== See also ==
- List of boxing films
