= Boomkatalog.One =

Studio album by Boomkat
- Released: March 18, 2003
- Recorded: 2002–2003
- Genres: Pop rock; hip hop; electropop; dance-pop
- Length: 53:19
- Label: DreamWorks Records
- Producers: Kellin Manning; Taryn Manning; Martin Pradler

Boomkat chronology
Boomkatalog.One (2003)	A Million Trillion Stars (2008)

Singles from Boomkatalog.One
- 1. "The Wreckoning" Released: May 18, 2003 (US); 2. "What U Do 2 Me" Released: December 2, 2003 (US)

Boomkatalog.One is the debut album by the brother-sister duo Boomkat, released in the United States on March 18, 2003, by DreamWorks Records. It features the singles "The Wreckoning" and "What U Do 2 Me". The track "Wastin' My Time" originally appeared on the soundtrack to the film 8 Mile, released in 2002.

== Style and themes ==
Taryn and Kellin Manning have been part of the producing and writing of the album, and many of the song lyrics are very personal.

== Critical reception ==
Professional ratings
Aggregate scores
Source	Rating
Metacritic	54/100
Review scores
Source	Rating
AllMusic	3/5 stars
Blender	2/5 stars
E!	B−
Entertainment Weekly	C
Q	1/5 stars
Rolling Stone	2/5 stars

Boomkatalog.One received mixed reviews from music critics. On Metacritic, which assigns a normalized rating out of 100 to reviews from mainstream critics, the album received an average score of 54, based on 8 reviews.

Barry Walters of Rolling Stone was critical of the duo's talents, saying that Taryn was acting more than singing and Kellin was Americanizing trip hop with unnecessary production tricks, concluding that: "Despite their fakeness, Boomkat fill the smarter-than-your-average-pop void left by fellow film-music switch-hitter Vitamin C." DJ Ron Slomowicz of About.com felt that the album was hampered by false advertisement because of the subpar tracks ("Now Understand This" and "Wasting My Time") in the middle portion of the record but still found the rest of it enjoyable, saying that: "[A]t its best, Boomkatalog is an energetic fusion of hip-hop and jungle, but at its worst it is a mishmash of wannabe styles." Keith Caulfield of Billboard praised the duo's sound for being an amalgam of different genres and Taryn's voice for its resemblance of Nelly Furtado, Macy Gray and Melanie C, concluding that: "Adventurous music fans should flock to Boomkat, especially those that thirst for an alternative to the pop norm." Johnny Loftus of AllMusic found the processed supporting vocals and the tracks "Wasting My Time" and "What U Do 2 Me" as the album's weak spots but still praised it for Kellin's production work and Taryn's vocal delivery, calling it "a crazy/beautiful mix of irritating and endearing... with the clowning, pointed cynicism of a female Ad-Rock," saying that: "Boomkatalog.One is a clever marriage of technology, creativity, and straight-up sass that gets away with being much more enjoyable than it might deserve."

== Track listing ==
All tracks are written by Kellin Manning and Taryn Manning.

Boomkatalog.One track listing
No.	Title	Length
1.	"Yo!verture"	2:24
2.	"The Wreckoning"	3:09
3.	"Now Understand This"	3:10
4.	"Wastin' My Time"	3:49
5.	"Move On"	3:51
6.	"B4 It's 2 L8"	4:13
7.	"Know Me"	3:29
8.	"Daydreamin'"	3:53
9.	"Crazylove"	3:41
10.	"Look at All the People"	5:12
11.	"Bein' Bad"	4:17
12.	"What U Do 2 Me"	3:50
13.	"Answers"	3:59
14.	"Left Side/Right Side"	4:22

== Charts ==
Chart performance for Boomkatalog.One
Chart (2003)	Peak position
Australian Albums (ARIA)	96
New Zealand Albums (RMNZ)	43
US Billboard 200	88
