= Taryn Manning =

American actress and singer (born 1978)

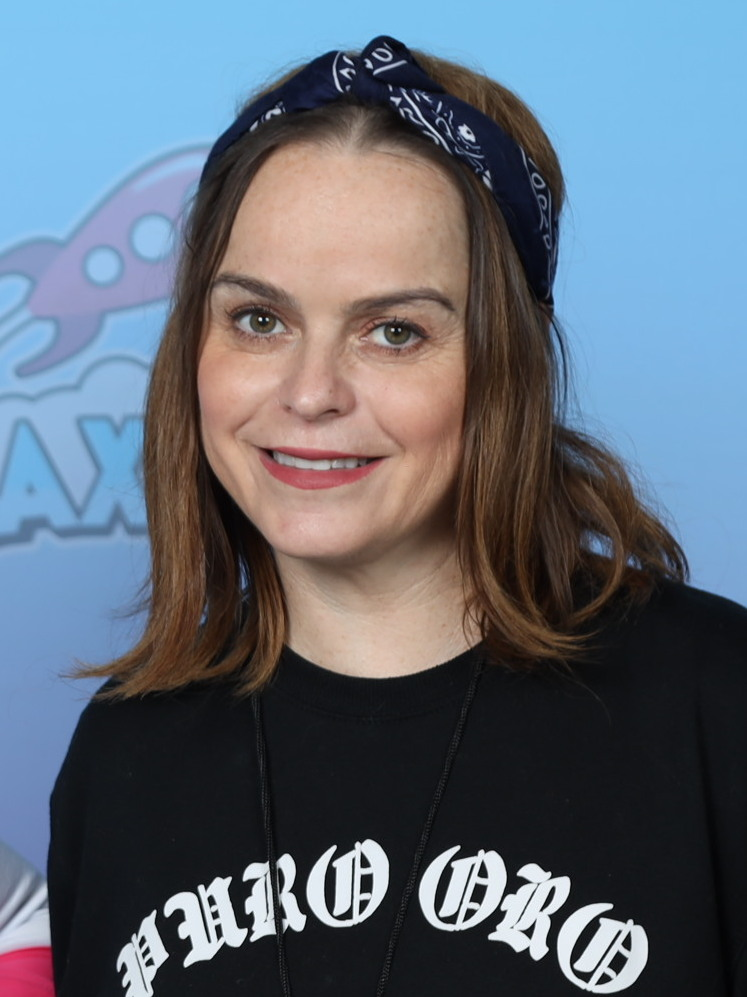
- Manning in 2023
- Born: November 6, 1978 (age 48); Falls Church, Virginia, U.S.
- Occupations: Actress; songwriter; singer; producer; director
- Musical career
- Genres: Pop rock, electropop, dance-pop, pop, hip hop
- Instrument: Vocals
- Years active: 1994–present
- Label: DreamWorks
- Formerly of: Boomkat
- Website: www.tarynmanning.com

Taryn Manning (born November 6, 1978) is an American actress and singer. She is best known for portraying Tiffany "Pennsatucky" Doggett in the Netflix original series Orange Is the New Black (2013–2019), Cherry in Sons of Anarchy (2008–2010), Nola in Hustle & Flow (2005) and Janeane in 8 Mile (2002).

== Early life ==
Taryn Manning was born in Falls Church, Virginia, the daughter of Bill Manning, a musician, and his wife, Sharyn Louise (née White). Manning's parents divorced when she was two months old. She and her brother Kellin were raised by their mother in Tucson, Arizona. Manning grew up living in a trailer park with her brother and single mother, who supported the family on a strict income: "My mom didn't buy herself a new pair of shoes and a new outfit until I moved out ... Literally when I asked my mom for a dollar I got one single dollar." In spite of the family's financial troubles, her mother was able to enroll Manning in karate, dance, and acting classes. When Manning was 12, her family relocated to Encinitas, California. Two years later, her father died by suicide.

== Acting career ==
=== 1999–2005: Beginnings ===
Manning began acting in the late 1990s, appearing in small roles in several film and television productions, including episodes of The Practice, Get Real, NYPD Blue and Popular. She also made a guest-appearance on the TV series Boston Public, in a role that was specifically written for her. In 1999, she had an uncredited role in Speedway Junky. She also auditioned for the American version of Popstars, which aired in early 2001 on The WB.

She made her film debut with a part in the romantic drama Crazy/Beautiful, which was followed by a role in the 2002 feature film Crossroads, where she played one of two best friends of singer Britney Spears. She had minor roles in 8 Mile as B-Rabbit's ex-girlfriend, Janeane, and in Peter Kosminsky's White Oleander. Along with supporting roles in the films Lucky 13 and Debating Robert Lee, Manning appeared briefly in Anthony Minghella's Civil War melodrama Cold Mountain (2003) and in the romantic comedy A Lot Like Love (2005).

=== 2005–present: Independent films and breakthrough ===
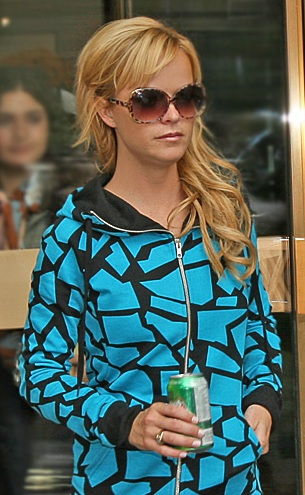
Manning at the 2007 Toronto International Film Festival

Her breakthrough role was as Nola, a prostitute in Memphis, Tennessee, in the 2005 film Hustle & Flow. Director Craig Brewer saw Manning's picture in a photography book and was convinced that the actress who played Nola should look just like her. Subsequent film roles include Unbeatable Harold, When the Nines Roll Over., and, later, Weirdsville, which co-starred Scott Speedman and Wes Bentley. Boomkat's song "It's Not My Fault" appeared on the soundtrack for the film as a duet by Manning and John Rowley. In 2007, she played Ivy Chitty on the short-lived Fox television series Drive. In After Sex Manning played the supporting role of Alanna. She had leading roles in horror films Cult and Banshee; in the latter, she performed her own stunts. "I got hurt one day during one of the chase scenes, where another car crashed into my car," Manning explained of her stunts. Manning appeared in the romantic comedy Jack and Jill vs. the World. She played Rita Cherry on four episodes of Sons of Anarchy. In 2008 she appeared in Butch Walker's music video for "The Weight Of Her" and in will.i.am's collage-style music video, "Yes We Can". She co-starred with Bill Pullman in the surreal drama film Your Name Here, in which she played Nikki, who is based on Victoria Principal. The film is based loosely on sci-fi writer Philip K. Dick's life.

In 2009, she appeared in The Perfect Age of Rock 'n' Roll. The film received mostly favorable reviews from critics and fans. Manning joined forces with Ron Perlman in two 2009 films, The Devil's Tomb and The Job. She also appeared in the horror film Kill Theory. The Job premiered at the San Diego Film Festival on September 25, 2009. Critics called the film "entertaining and fun with twists that arrive like clockwork." In 2009, Taryn portrayed Caroline Bishop in Five Good Years. In February 2010, she was cast in the reboot of Hawaii Five-0 as the younger sister of main character Steve McGarrett.

In early 2012, Manning signed on to star in the supernatural web series The Unknown, which premiered on Crackle on July 13, 2012. In 2013, she began playing Tiffany "Pennsatucky" Doggett in the original Netflix series Orange Is the New Black. In 2015 she portrayed Michelle Knight in the Lifetime film Cleveland Abduction based on the real-life events surrounding Ariel Castro's kidnappings.

Manning was a part of Season 16 of the celebrity version of Worst Cooks in America. She quit the season in the second episode after refusing to eat a chicken foot. In 2020, Taryn signed on to Coke Daniel's suspense thriller Karen. She played the role of Karen Drexler, a literal Karen who is obsessed with her black neighbors.

In December 2024, Manning was announced as a cast member in independent drama Out Come The Wolves based on the Rancid 1995 album of the same name.

== Music career ==
=== 2001–2011: Pop music beginnings and Boomkat ===
In 2001, Manning auditioned for the musical reality television show Popstars USA on the WB. In 2003, Manning and her brother Kellin formed the band Boomkat. The band first signed a major label deal with American Idol producer Randy Jackson, but the deal fell through. Robbie Robertson then signed them to DreamWorks Records, which was Boomkat's label from 2002 to 2004. In 2002, she sang a rendition of "I'll Take You There" with Tweet in several Gap commercials directed by Peter Lindbergh. Their debut album, Boomkatalog.One, was released on March 18, 2003. Boomkat released two singles, "The Wreckoning" and "What U Do 2 Me". The first single, "The Wreckoning", hit No. 1 on the Hot Dance Music/Club Play chart. The band closed out 2003 as the No. 5 Hot Dance Club Play Artist for the year in Billboard Magazine. Music from Boomkatalog.One has also appeared in movies, including Mean Girls, Crossroads, The Hot Chick, 8 Mile and The Italian Job.

After a hiatus, in an interview in October 2005's issue of Nylon magazine, Manning mentioned that she would write songs for the next album once they found another record label. In 2007, the act was dropped by their label DreamWorks. Boomkat released their first single in four years, called "Runaway" on April 8, 2008. In early June 2008, Boomkat's second album A Million Trillion Stars became available in online stores.

In October 2008, Boomkat played several shows throughout the Los Angeles area, hitting spots like North Hollywood's NOHO Scene Festival and venues such as the Viper Room and Hotel Cafe. In December 2008 Manning recorded a version of Tom Petty's "Christmas All Over Again", which premiered on her official Myspace page. On March 3, 2009, their official first single, "Run Boy" was released along with a visually electric music video. The single premiered on People.com. A Million Trillion Stars was officially released on March 10 by independent record label, Little Vanilla Records. In 2009, Manning was featured on indie band Dreamers' song "Lonely World", as well as in their music video for "The Dreamers". In the music video, she takes on the role of Ring Master. On October 28, she announced that Boomkat was working on their third studio album. The band's fifth music video from A Million Trillion Stars premiered on MySpace on Wednesday, February 17, 2010.

=== 2009–present: Solo career ===
In September 2009, Manning stated that she is working on a solo album. She sang her first solo single, "So Talented" in an episode of Melrose Place. The song was written with the producer Linney (Darkchild Entertainment). After the song "Spotlight" was featured in an episode of Hawaii Five-0, it was released via iTunes & Amazon MP3. "Turn It Up" was released as the first official single in 2011. The music video premiered on People.com on May 4, 2011. "Turn It Up" peaked at No. 21 on Billboard (magazine)'s Dance Club Songs Chart for the week of October 22, 2011. Manning's single "Send Me Your Love" was released digitally on August 21, 2012. The song was the first official single from her solo album entitled Freedom City, which was released in September. It topped the Dance Club Songs chart. Manning followed "Send Me Your Love" with "Summer Ashes", a collaboration with KDrew released on July 23, 2013. Her single with Bynon 'All The Way' was released January 12, 2015. On May 5, 2017, Manning released her solo single "Gltchlfe". The single peaked at number 1 on Billboard's Dance Club Songs Chart on August 10, 2017, becoming her second number 1 on the chart, following "Send Me Your Love" in 2012. In 2019, she released the single "The Light" as well as three remixes. The singles "Bring Me Back To You" and "Chains" were also released in 2019. On August 14, 2020, she released the single "Time Wasted" for digital streaming.

== Other ventures ==
Boomkat's independent label, Little Vanilla Records is owned by Manning. From 2005 to 2009 Manning co-owned a clothing line called Born Uniqorn with best friend Tara Jane. She has appeared in advertising campaigns for Juicy Couture and Frankie B. Her campaign with Frankie B included a short film, called "Let's Get Lost", which is the original song featured in the video by musician Gilby Clarke with vocals by Manning. She has appeared on the cover of several magazines, including Nylon, Stuff, FHM, Dazed & Confused, 944, Music Fashion, Miami Living and Paw Print. Manning posed nude for Playboy in the April 2011 issue of the magazine.

== Personal life ==
As of 2020, Manning resides in Palm Springs, California. In 2017, Manning stated that she prefers dating men and does not identify as a lesbian, although she has dated women in the past.

Manning was aboard JetBlue Flight 292 when it made an emergency landing at Los Angeles International Airport on September 21, 2005, after the nose gear jammed in an abnormal position. No one was injured. She stated that "it was the most surreal, out-of-body experience I ever had."

=== Legal and personal issues ===
On October 12, 2012, Manning was arrested for assaulting her personal assistant and makeup artist, Holli Hartman. Hartman, who resided in Manning's apartment at the time, declined to prosecute. Manning's lawyer cited Hartman as saying that she and Manning loved each other and wanted the ordeal to be over. In November 2012, Manning accepted a plea bargain of one day of community service and good behavior for the next six months, after which the case would be closed.

In November 2014, Manning was arrested for violating a restraining order and making criminal threats against girlfriend Jeanine Heller. In 2015, Manning accused Heller of harassment. Heller was sentenced to four months in jail for violating the conditions of her plea bargain. Prior to their relationship souring, Heller and Manning lived together at Heller's New York residence. In 2016, Manning was found to have fabricated contact violations, and as a result Heller had been falsely arrested and imprisoned via forced plea deal. In 2020, Heller was awarded damages for an undisclosed amount from the Manhattan District Attorney and New York State Supreme Court.

In 2016, Manning was again accused of attacking girlfriend Hollianne Hartman. Hartman sought a domestic restraining order against Manning but was denied due to jurisdictional issues. The attack was one of several that Hartman claimed to have suffered, with the most recent alleged abuse occurring in late 2015 at Manning's Manhattan apartment. Manning's lawyer stated that the application for a restraining order was preceded by stalking and theft charges filed against Hartman and was intended as a distraction from those charges.

In 2016, Manning filed a lawsuit against the state of New York claiming she was falsely arrested in 2014. A Manhattan judge dismissed the case stating Manning's claims "lacked merit" and no such violation occurred.

In 2019, Manning claimed she was "epically hacked" and the victim of "cyber-criminals" and "cyberbullying" after several disturbing Instagram posts included disparaging remarks about the cast of Orange Is the New Black.

=== Substance abuse issues ===
Manning has a history of alcoholism. In 2016, Orange is the New Black producers threatened to remove Manning from the show and required her to enter a drug rehabilitation facility for treatment after her alcohol use began to interfere with production of the series. Manning, defying production orders, refused treatment and left rehab after one day.

In 2023, Manning caused concern when she posted a series of erratic content to her social media including a video of her inebriated behind the wheel of a car graphically detailing her affair with a married man.

== Filmography ==
=== Film ===
Year	Title	Role	Notes
1999	Speedway Junky	Girl in Car	Uncredited
2000	The Specials	Autograph Hound	
2001	Crazy/Beautiful	Maddy	
2002	Crossroads	Mimi	
2002	White Oleander	Niki	
2002	8 Mile	Janeane	
2003	Cold Mountain	Shyla	
2004	Dandelion	Danny Voss	
2005	Hustle & Flow	Nola	
2005	Lucky 13	Sam	
2005	A Lot Like Love	Ellen Martin	
2006	Unbeatable Harold	Sandy	
2006	The Breed	Sara	
2006	Banshee	Sage Rion	
2007	Cult	Cassandra	
2007	After Sex	Alanna	
2007	Weirdsville	Matilda / Mattie	
2008	Jack and Jill vs. the World	Jill	
2008	Your Name Here	Nikki	
2009	Kill Theory	Alex	
2009	The Devil's Tomb	Sarah "Doc" Harrington	Direct-to-Video
2009	The Job	Joy	
2009	The Perfect Age of Rock 'n' Roll	Rose Atropos	
2010	Waking Madison	Margaret	
2010	Groupie	Riley Simms	Also associate producer
2010	Love Ranch	Mallory	
2010	Redemption Road	Jackie	
2010	Heaven's Rain	Leslie	
2011	The Speed of Thought	Kira	
2011	Man Without a Head	Kamila	
2011	513	Lisa	
2011	Zombie Apocalypse	Ramona	Television film
2013	All American Christmas Carol	Cindy	
2014	Low Down	Colleen	
2015	Experimenter	Mrs. Lowe	
2015	Cleveland Abduction	Michelle Knight	Television film
2015	#Horror	Gloria	
2015	Almost Broadway	Molly	
2015	A Light Beneath Their Feet	Gloria Gerringson	
2016	A Winter Rose	Patricia Rose	
2016	It Snows All the Time	April	Also executive producer
2016	Happy Yummy Chicken	Laura Splinterschloss	Also producer
2017	The Vault	Vee Dillon	
2017	Blackmail	Molly	
2017	Swing State	Adrienne Lockhart	
2018	The Amendment	Leslie Douglass	
2018	The Brawler	Phyllis Wepner	
2019	The Murder of Nicole Brown Simpson	Faye Resnick	
2021	Last Call	Ali	
2021	The Gateway	Corey	
2021	Karen	Karen Drexler	Also producer
2021	Every Last One of Them	Maggie	Also executive producer
2022	Sanctioning Evil	FBI Special Agent Kensington	
2022	Bobcat Moretti	Debra Moretti	Also executive producer
2023	Miranda's Victim	Twila	
2023	One Day as a Lion	Taylor Love	
2023	Porterville	Agent Andrews	
2024	Bloodline Killer	Sam Marrin	
2024	They Turned Us Into Killers	Macie	
2026	And Out Comes the Wolf		

=== Television ===
Year	Title	Role	Notes
1999	The Practice	Jenny Rains	Episode: "Of Human Bondage"
1999	Come On, Get Happy: The Partridge Family Story	Groupie	Movie
1999–2000	Get Real	Rebecca Peabody	9 episodes
2000	Kiss Tomorrow Goodbye	Tattooed Dancer	Movie
2000	Pacific Blue	N/A	Episode: "Blind Eye"
2000	Popular	Ashley Carmichael	Episode: "Misery Loathes Company"
2001	NYPD Blue	Tracy	Episode: "Oh Golly Goth"
2001	Boston Public	Cara Glynne	Episode: "Chapter Twenty-Seven"
2003	Punk'd	Herself	Episode #2.6
2003	The New Tom Green Show	Herself	Guest appearance
2003	The Twilight Zone	Tina Bishop	Episode: "Fair Warning"
2005	CSI: Miami	Heidi Dillon	Episode: "Money Plane"
2007	Viva Laughlin	Geneva	Episode: "What a Whale Wants"
2007	Drive	Ivy Chitty / Ellie Laird	Main role
2007	On Set, on Edge	Herself	Miniseries
2008–2010	Sons of Anarchy	Rita ("Cherry")	7 episodes
2009	Free Radio	Herself	Episode: "Earthquake"
2009	Melrose Place	Herself	Episode: "Grand"
2010–2019	Hawaii Five-0	Mary Ann McGarrett	Main season 1; recurring subsequently (10 episodes)
2011	Law & Order: Special Victims Unit	Larissa Welsh	Episode: "Possessed"
2012	Burn Notice	Nicole	Episode: "Mixed Messages"
2012	America's Next Top Model	Herself	Episode: "The Girl Who Makes The Grade" #19.1
2013	Oh Sit!	Herself	Episode: "Send Me Your Love"
2013–2019	Orange Is the New Black	Tiffany "Pennsatucky" Doggett	Main role
2014	Hollywood Game Night	Herself	Episode: "Orange Is the New Game Night"
2018	Hollywood Medium with Tyler Henry	Herself	Season 3, Episode 3
2019	Worst Cooks in America	Herself / Contestant	2 episodes
2019	At Home with Amy Sedaris	Tambi Tucker	Episode: "Hospital-tality"

=== Music videos ===
Year	Artist	Song
2001	Oleander	"Are You There?"
2007	Nickelback	"Rockstar"
2008	Butch Walker	"The Weight of Her"
2008	will.i.am	"Yes We Can"
2009	Dreamers	"The Dreamers"
2011	Killola	"She's a Bitch"
2012	Train	"50 Ways to Say Goodbye"
2012	Zedd	"Spectrum"
2012	Passion Pit	"Constant Conversations"
2013	Razihel	"Seeking of the Truth"
2018	Chris Pierce	"Trouble Man"
2023	Atmosphere	"Okay"

=== Video games ===
Year	Title	Role	Notes	Ref.
2026	Grand Theft Auto VI	Vicki	Voice, motion capture	

== Discography ==
=== Singles ===
Title	Year	Peak chart positions	Album
Title	Year	US Dance	Album
"So Talented"	2009	—	Non-album singles
"Spotlight"	2010	—	Non-album singles
"Turn It Up!"	2011	21	Non-album singles
"Send Me Your Love" (featuring Sultan and Ned Shepard)	2012	1	Non-album singles
"Roaming Unicorn"	2012	—	Non-album singles
"Summer Ashes"	2013	—	Non-album singles
"All the Way"	2015	—	Non-album singles
"Champagne" (featuring Boomkat)	2015	—	Non-album singles
"Curiosity"	2015	—	Non-album singles
"Free Them"	2015	—	Non-album singles
"Pop 808"	2015	—	Non-album singles
"Gltchlfe"	2017	1	Non-album singles

=== Other recordings ===
Year	Song	Notes
2008	"Christmas All Over Again" (Cover)	Duet by Taryn Manning and Butch Walker
2011	"Blast Off (Gwap Off)"	By Taryn Manning featuring Tony DeNiro
2013	"Seeking of the Truth"	By Razihel featuring Taryn Manning

== Awards and nominations ==
Year	Association	Category	Work	Result
2005	Washington D.C. Area Film Critics Association	Best Breakthrough Performance	Hustle & Flow	Nominated
2006	Screen Actors Guild Awards	Outstanding Performance by a Cast in a Motion Picture (shared with the cast)	Hustle & Flow	Nominated
2006	Black Reel Awards	Best Ensemble	Hustle & Flow	Nominated
2009	Bel Air Film Festival	Film Fashion Visionary		Won
2014	Gold Derby Awards	Comedy Guest Actress	Orange Is the New Black	Nominated
2015	Screen Actors Guild Awards	Outstanding Performance by an Ensemble in a Comedy Series	Orange Is the New Black	Won
2016	Screen Actors Guild Awards	Outstanding Performance by an Ensemble in a Comedy Series	Orange Is the New Black	Won
2017	Screen Actors Guild Awards	Outstanding Performance by an Ensemble in a Comedy Series	Orange Is the New Black	Won
2018	Screen Actors Guild Awards	Outstanding Performance by an Ensemble in a Comedy Series	Orange Is the New Black	Nominated
2022	Golden Raspberry Awards	Worst Picture	Karen	Nominated
2022	Golden Raspberry Awards	Worst Actress	Karen	Nominated
2022	Golden Raspberry Awards	Worst Supporting Actress	Every Last One of Them	Nominated
