= Send Me Your Love (song) =

Single by Taryn Manning featuring Sultan + Ned Shepard
- Released: August 21, 2012
- Recorded: 2012
- Genre: Pop; dance-pop; EDM; progressive house
- Length: 4:10
- Label: Citrusonic Stereophonic
- Composer(s): Ivan Corraliza; Ilsey Juber; Michael Linney; Taryn Manning; Sultan + Ned Shepard
- Producer(s): Sultan + Ned Shepard

Taryn Manning featuring Sultan + Ned Shepard singles chronology
"Turn It Up" (2011)	"Send Me Your Love" (2012)

"Send Me Your Love" is a song by American singer-songwriter and actress Taryn Manning. It was written by Ivan Corraliza, Ilsey Juber, Michael Linney, Manning and its producers electronic music duo Sultan + Ned Shepard. The song released as a non-album single on August 21, 2012, by Citrusonic Stereophonic. It peaked at number-one on the Dance Club Songs chart in the week of November 17, 2012.

== Track list ==
Single feat. Sultan & Ned Shepard

1. "Send Me Your Love" (feat. Sultan, Ned Shepard) [Edit] – 4:10

Single feat. Sultan & Ned Shepard Extended Version

1. "Send Me Your Love" (feat, Sultan, Ned Shepard) [Original] – 6:09

Single feat. Valetto

1. "Send Me Your Love" (Radio Mix) – 3:50

Single feat. Valetto extended version

1. "Send Me Your Love" (Extended Club Mix) – 6:21

Remixes Pt. 1

1. "Send Me Your Love" (R3hab Remix) – 5:45
2. "Send Me Your Love" (Dave Audé Club) – 8:26
3. "Send Me Your Love" (Dave Audé Dub) – 6:30
4. "Send Me Your Love" (Dave Audé Mixshow) – 6:19
5. "Send Me Your Love" (Dave Audé Radio Mix) – 3:35
6. "Send Me Your Love" (Fred Falke Remix) – 7:35
7. "Send Me Your Love" (Fred Falke Instrumental) – 7:35
8. "Send Me Your Love" (Eddie Amador's Mochico Tech Remix) – 7:44

Remixes Pt. 2

1. "Send Me Your Love" (Linney & ILL Factor OG Extended Mix) – 6:40
2. "Send Me Your Love" (Linney & ILL Factor OG Edit) – 4:45
3. "Send Me Your Love" (Rich Morel's Hot Sauce Club Mix) – 7:07
4. "Send Me Your Love" (Rich Morel's Radio Edit) – 4:05
5. "Send Me Your Love" (Hamel & Jeremus Remix) – 5:22
6. "Send Me Your Love" (Hamel & Jeremus Dub) – 5:22
7. "Send Me Your Love" (Automatic Panic Anthem Remix) – 6:28
8. "Send Me Your Love" (Eddie Amador Remix) – 7:10

KDrew Remix Single

1. "Send Me Your Love" (KDrew Remix) – 4:54

== Chart performance ==
Chart (2012)	Peak position
US Hot Dance Club Songs (Billboard)	1

=== Year-end charts ===
Chart (2012)	Position
US Hot Dance Club Songs (Billboard)	49

== See also ==
- List of number-one dance singles of 2012 (U.S.)
