= TEMP3ST =

American indie electronic band

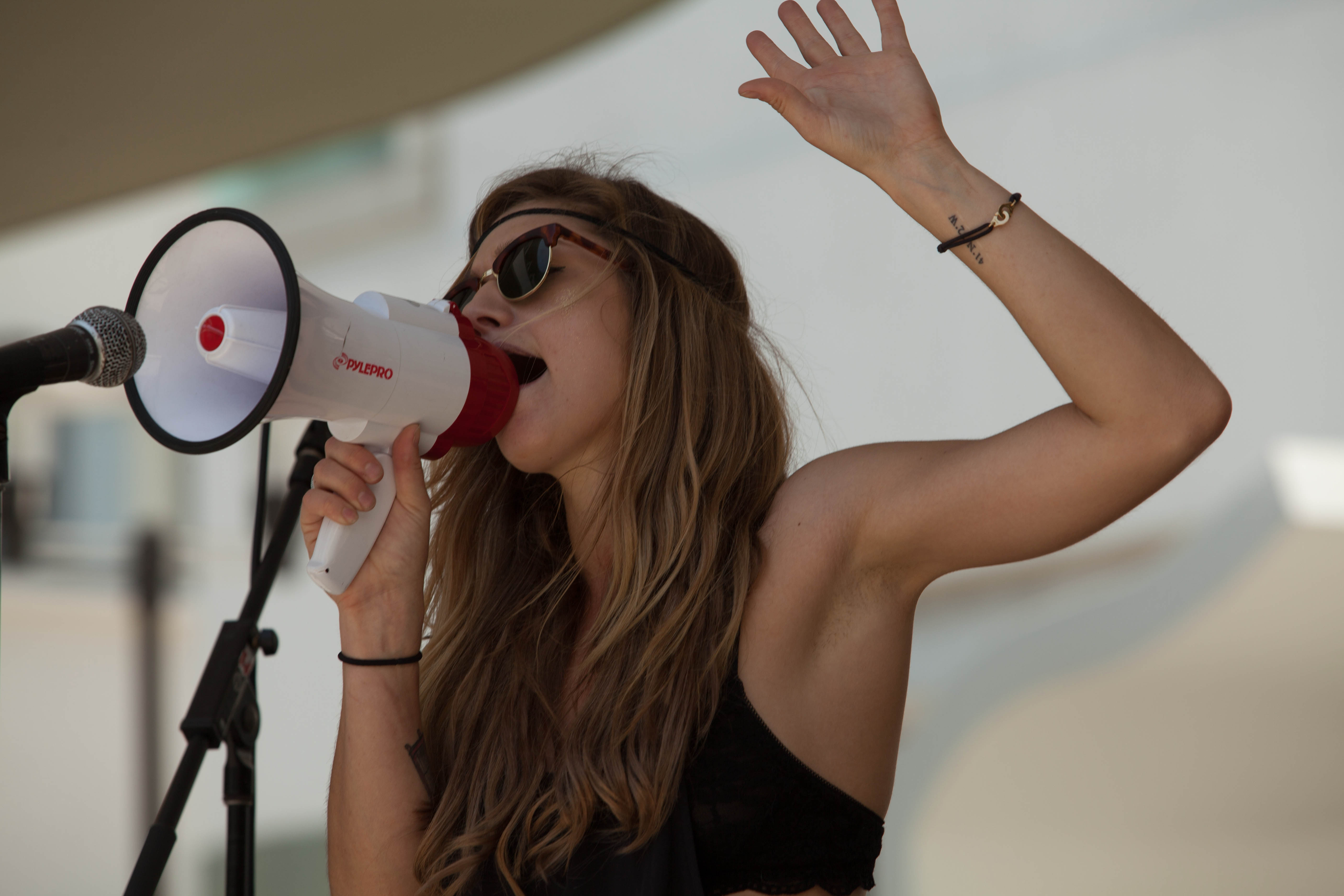
- TEMP3ST performing at 2012 Make Music Pasadena

Background information
- Also known as: Tempest
- Origin: Los Angeles, California, United States
- Genres: Alternative pop, electronic rock, indie, soul
- Years active: 2012–present
- Members: Gabrielle Wortman; Christopher Roberts; George Madrid

TEMP3ST is an American indie electronic rock band, consisting of award-winning songwriter and producer, Gabrielle Wortman, Christopher Roberts and George Madrid. The band formed in May 2012 after a three-year collaboration between Christopher Roberts and non-binary singer Gabrielle Wortman during their solo career. Wortman was named 2012 Sundance Film Festival's "Next Big Thing" on Park City TV, a title previously held by The Civil Wars among others. TEMP3ST independently released their debut EP, i am tempest., under the TEMP3ST band name on June 10, 2012.

== History ==
Gabrielle Wortman moved to Los Angeles, California in 2007 to attend the University of California, Los Angeles for a degree in Music Media and Management where they were an honors student. While at UCLA, Gabrielle performed in both the 2009 and 2011 UCLA Spring Sing events, noted for having produced talent such as Sara Bareilles and Maroon 5 in earlier years. Their performance in the Strathmore Players' rendition of Jerry Maguire the Musical in 2009 won them the Bruin's Choice Award as well as the award for Best Production. In 2009, Wortman worked with producer Sejo Navajas to record a debut studio album at 4th Street Recording Studio in Santa Monica, CA. The album went on to receive a 2009 nomination for the Los Angeles Music Awards' "AAA Album of the Year" category. During the recording and release of this album they met drummer, Christopher Roberts. The two began working together and eventually formed TEMP3ST.

TEMP3ST has been most noted by critics for their electronically infused unique style, being described as "ground-breaking urban-soul-alternative artist and a radical music tempest." Their songs reflect a moody, dark, and soulful style. Wortman's songwriting has been praised for uniquely combining a distinct southern soul and an urban vibe with "sexy electronic beats".

TEMP3ST has performed at music festivals around the America, including opening for Grouplove and Cults at Make Music Pasadena, five performances during the 2012 Sundance Film Festival and Seattle Pridefest 2011.

== i am tempest. EP ==
In 2012, Gabrielle and Christopher released their first EP under new nomenclature of TEMP3ST. The album features four songs written and produced by Wortman. It was received to a sea of praise from indie blogs such as IndieUpdate, The Burning Ear, Buzzbands LA, Your Music Radar, Music Under Fire, Indie Bands Blog, and more.

== Discography ==
- The Secret Life of Gabby (2006) (as Gabrielle Wortman)
- Home Is Where the Art Is (2009) (as Gabrielle Wortman)
- The Voodoo EP (2011) (as Gabrielle Wortman)
- i am tempest. (2012)
