= The Wreckoning (song) =

Single by Boomkat

from the album Boomkatalog.One
- B-side: "Rockin with the Best"
- Released: March 4, 2003
- Genre: Trip hop
- Length: 3:08
- Label: DreamWorks; Polydor; Universal
- Songwriters: Taryn Manning; Kellin Manning
- Producers: Martin Pradler; Kellin Manning; Taryn Manning

Boomkat singles chronology
"The Wreckoning" (2003)	"What U Do 2 Me" (2003)

Alternative cover
- CD2

"The Wreckoning" is the debut single by American electronic duo Boomkat. It was first released to radio in December 2002, and then commercially in March 2003. The song is from their debut album Boomkatalog.One. Generally classified as a trip hop song with pop and R&B influences, the song details a breakup.

Upon its release, the song drew favorable assessments from music critics, many of whom regarded it as a highlight of the album. In the duo's native United States, the single peaked at number 88 on the Billboard Hot 100, in addition to topping the Dance Club Songs chart. The single also charted throughout Europe and Australia. At the end of 2003, it was ranked the sixth-most successful Dance Club Songs chart entry of the year, and it has received critical praise in retrospect.

== Composition ==
"The Wreckoning" has been classified as exemplifying "Americaniz(ed) trip-hop" and as being a "pop update" of the genre, similar to the work of English electronic band Morcheeba. It has also been called "a vengeful breakup song" in which vocalist Taryn Manning's vocals incorporate elements of R&B. The Village Voice wrote that in the song, Manning "glares at an ex-boyfriend like a young Shirley Manson". In another song on Boomkatalog.One, Manning elaborates on the circumstances surrounding the song's composition: "I used to be in love with someone crazy as me/‘Course we broke up so then I wrote 'The Wreckoning.'"

== Releases ==
In late 2002, DreamWorks Records sent the song to top 40 radio stations, and in December of that year, the song first entered the Billboard dance chart. The following year, on March 4, 2003, the song was commercially released as the lead single from the group's debut album. It was released as a CD single, digitally, and as a 12-inch vinyl. A German edition of the CD single was released on April 28 by DreamWorks Records. On May 19, a digital, three-track release of the single included an eight-minute remix of the song, in addition to a B-side titled "Rockin' with the Best". The song also spawned a number of remix releases.

The song was featured in the 2003 film The Italian Job, although it was not included on the accompanying soundtrack. It was also included on the 2008 Universal Records compilation Rrrrrock.

== Reception ==
=== Critical ===
"The Wreckoning" was recognized by multiple critics as one of the highlights of its parent album, with Metacritic designating the song the album's "Top Track". DJ Ron Slomowicz, reviewing the song's parent album for about.com, deemed the song one of the best songs on Boomkatalog.One, calling it and "Look at All the People" "amazing songs". Rolling Stone deemed the song a "brash cut". Marshall Bowden, writing for PopMatters, noted Manning's exaggerated vocal performance on the song but argued that it "serves to distinguish her" from other pop singers like Christina Aguilera and Britney Spears. In 2008, critic Michael Slezak, writing for Entertainment Weekly, argued that in retrospect the song should have been "a huge hit".

=== Commercial ===
In the United States, the single entered multiple Billboard charts. The single entered the Billboard Hot 100 on the chart dated March 22, 2003, debuting and peaking at number 88. On the chart dated March 29, in its second and final week on the chart, the song remained at its peak. The single also entered the Mainstream Top 40 chart, spending seven weeks on the tally and attaining a peak of number 25 on the chart dated March 15, 2003.

On Dance Club Play chart, since renamed the Dance Club Songs chart, dated December 14, 2002, "The Wreckoning" debuted at number 43, receiving the designation of "Hot Shot Debut" for that week. In its twelfth week on the tally, on the chart dated March 1, 2003, the song rose one spot to number one on the chart, becoming the duo's first of two singles to top the chart. The song was later ranked the sixth most-successful Dance Club Songs chart entry of 2003; Boomkat was also ranked one of the ten most-successful artists on that chart, with two number ones: "The Wreckoning" and follow-up "What U Do 2 Me". The single also entered multiple Billboard single sales charts, peaking at number nine on the Hot 100 Singles Sales chart and number 34 on the Hot R&B/Hip-Hop Singles Sales chart.

The single charted throughout Europe as well. On the UK Singles Chart, the song debuted and peaked at number 37 on the chart dated May 31, 2003, spending a total of one week in the top 40 and two weeks in the top 100.

== Music video ==
A music video was also released to promote the song. Manning reflected that filming the video was what "made it (the realization of her dreams) official for" her. Speaking to Billboard, a Los Angeles radio station director credited the video with contributing to the song's popularity.

== Track listings ==
American CD single

1. "The Wreckoning" – 3:20
2. "The Wreckoning" – 3:01

3-track single

1. "The Wreckoning" – 3:10
2. "Rockin' with the Best" – 4:48
3. "The Wreckoning" (Thunderpuss Club Mix) – 8:30

== Charts ==
=== Weekly charts ===
Weekly chart performance for "The Wreckoning"
Chart (2003)	Peak position
Australia (ARIA)	16
Austria (Ö3 Austria Top 40)	46
Germany (GfK)	78
Netherlands (Single Top 100)	88
New Zealand (Recorded Music NZ)	13
Sweden (Sverigetopplistan)	25
Switzerland (Schweizer Hitparade)	40
UK Singles (OCC)	37
US Billboard Hot 100	88
US Pop Airplay (Billboard)	25
US Dance Club Songs (Billboard)	1

=== Year-end charts ===
Year-end chart performance for "The Wreckoning"
Chart (2003)	Position
US Dance Club Songs (Billboard)	6

== See also ==
- List of number-one dance singles of 2003 (U.S.)
