= Weirdsville =

- Theatrical release poster
- Directed by: Allan Moyle
- Written by: Willem Wennekers
- Produced by: Michael Baker; Hartley Gorenstein; Morris Ruskin; Jennifer L. Stivala; Nicholas D. Tabarrok; Perry Zimel
- Starring: Scott Speedman; Wes Bentley; Taryn Manning; Greg Bryk; Matt Frewer
- Cinematography: Adam Swica
- Edited by: Michael Doherty; Brigitte Rabazo
- Music by: John Rowley
- Distributed by: Magnolia Pictures; THINKFilm; Equinoxe Films; Shoreline Entertainment
- Release date: January 18, 2007 (Slamdance Film Festival)
- Running time: 90 minutes
- Countries: United States; Canada
- Language: English
- Box office: $9,700

Weirdsville is a 2007 black comedy film directed by Allan Moyle and written by Willem Wennekers. It premiered on January 18, 2007, at the Slamdance Film Festival.

The film takes place in Northern Ontario and was filmed in Hamilton, Ontario, Canada, and Brantford, Ontario, Canada.

== Plot ==
Nothing much happens in the lives of 20-something pals Dexter and Royce except for getting high and hanging out with Royce's girlfriend, Matilda ("Mattie"). This all changes one evening in Northern Ontario town Weedsville when Mattie overdoses on a stash of Dexter and Royce's drugs — drugs fronted by local drug kingpin and tough-guy Omar to sell in order to cover their previous drug debt. Thinking her dead and knowing that calling the cops would only land them in jail the pair decide to bury her in the boiler room of the closed drive-in theater where Royce used to work. The two set off to deal with Mattie's dead body.

While the boys begin to dig a grave downstairs, a Satanic cult led by another former employee (and former classmate of Dexter and Royce) Abel enters the supposedly abandoned drive-in and begins a ritual involving pentagrams and human bloodletting in the upstairs concession stand. Their plan is to resurrect Jason Taylor (hippie turned reluctant but rich Internet entrepreneur and Abel's unwitting hero) out of his coma. However, when Dexter walks in mid-sacrifice, everything goes awry.

Dexter and Royce are captured, gagged and duct-taped and Mattie's corpse is discovered. But when some of the sacrificed follower's blood unexpectedly "awakens" Matilda an all out chase ensues. Royce and Dexter get to her first, and the trio escapes. After safely stowing Mattie in Dexter's apartment, the boys run into Omar and his beefy sidekick Garry, who deliver a few swings of a curling stone and an ultimatum — debt (plus interest) paid by last call or he will severely injure the pair. Knowing that millionaire Jason Taylor has a safe full of money at his place, Dexter and Royce take off to break in and steal it, a plan previously mentioned by Mattie, who knows the combination to Taylor's safe.

With a few unexpected bumps along the way, such as running into, accidentally knocking out and then getting high the nephew of Taylor, who was housesitting, Dexter and Royce successfully manage to steal the safe. En route back to Dexter's apartment to grab Mattie, they run into Abel. A classic car chase causes our boys to seek refuge in a mall where they encounter a midget security guard named Martin. After winning his trust (Martin has unresolved issues with cults himself) he lets them leave without further trouble.

Meanwhile at the New Age Resource Centre, Mattie (having been kidnapped by Abel) has been tied to an upside-down cross along with an unconscious Jason Taylor. Abel's plan is to offer Lucifer Mattie's life in exchange for Jason's. Dexter and Royce arrive to try and stop the ritual and rescue Mattie. Omar shows up looking to collect his debt and he brought Gary — and his gun — with him. In hot pursuit of Abel and his cult, Martin and his (physically) diminutive friends arrive only to crash into Dex's car, propelling the safe from the trunk into the New Age Centre, crushing Abel.

With Abel plan's ruined and his life saved, Taylor gives Dexter and Royce the okay to hand off the safe with all of his money to clear their debt to Omar. They happily flee the scene with Mattie in tow, while Omar and the cult are killed in an explosion.

== Cast ==
- Wes Bentley as Royce
- Scott Speedman as Dexter
- Taryn Manning as Matilda
- Joey Beck as Sheldon
- Raoul Bhaneja as Omar
- Greg Bryk as Abel
- Randy Butcher as Hockey Goalie
- Maggie Castle as Treena
- Joe Dinicol as Jeremy Taylor
- Matt Frewer as Jason Taylor
- Derek Gilroy as "Squinty"
- James McQuade as Garry
- Mark Parr as Anthony
- Jordan Prentice as Martin
- Dax Ravina as Seamus
- Allan Redford as Theo
- Shayne Wyler as Todd

== Release ==
The film debuted at the 2007 Slamdance Film Festival and played the festival circuit, screening at the Edinburgh International Film Festival, the Toronto International Film Festival, and the Raindance Film Festival. The film opened in limited release in the United States in 1 theater in Austin, Texas on October 5, 2007, and expanded to 2 more theaters (in Atlanta and Portland) two weeks later. The film was released in the United Kingdom on November 16, 2007.

== Reception ==
Joe Leydon of Variety wrote: "Deconstructionists will delight in divining the influences that inform Weirdsville, a cleverly constructed, capably crafted and often uproarious shaggy-dog black comedy that riffs on everything from Trainspotting and Quentin Tarantino to Race With the Devil and Elmore Leonard. Nimbly directed by Allan Moyle, this Canadian-produced potential sleeper could command an even larger cult following than the helmer's enduringly popular Pump Up the Volume."

Stephen Farber of The Hollywood Reporter wrote: "Director Allan Moyle has described Weirdsville as a Canadian Trainspotting, which is a bit of wishful thinking... it lacks the inventiveness and biting edge of Danny Boyle's landmark movie" and while the film "has some quirky pleasures, it seems unlikely to achieve either major cult status or boxoffice success." Farber wrote further that some of the incidents in the script "are bizarrely funny" but "[Allan Moyle] fails to provide the energy necessary to keep us involved." Farber described the film as "frenetic and convoluted rather than pleasingly impudent." Speaking of the cast, Farber said "the cast is generally better than the material... Speedman and Bentley...demonstrate more charm incarnating these grungy characters than they have sometimes shown in blander heroic parts", and also said "Manning...is wasted here." Farber said "plotting is far too haphazard to hold the audience's attention" and wrote "some of it is funny-weird, but too much is pointlessly weird."

Rich Cline gave the film 4 out of 5 stars and said "this absurd crime odyssey has so much gonzo enthusiasm that it's impossible not to enjoy watching these crazed characters bounce off of each other" and said "the actors are hilariously charming, delivering scruffy, lively performances as a bunch of knuckleheads trying desperately to get out of a mess that gets more and more tangled." Cline also said "as it progresses, the plot gets a bit strained, and perhaps too farcical. But we stick with it because of the amiable cast".

On review aggregate website Rotten Tomatoes, Weirdsville has an approval rating of 58% based on 33 reviews. The site's critics consensus reads, "Though it can be confusing at times, Weirdsville is funny and quirky in equal measure."

== Awards ==
- Directors Guild of Canada Awards, 2007: DGC Craft Awards for Editing and Production Design (nominated)
- Motion Picture Sound Editors, 2009: Golden Reel Award for Best Sound Editing (nominated)

== Soundtrack ==
1. Struggle Struggle Struggle - The Weber Brothers
2. Stoned - Blackie And The Rodeo Kings
3. Chicken Soup For the F**K You Too - Shout Out Out Out
4. Uneasy - Perfume Tree
5. Bandits - Buck 65
6. 5th Night's Hallucination - theCreep
7. Retox/Requiem - John Rowley
8. Pinned Together, Falling Apart - The Dears
9. It's Not My Fault - Taryn Manning
10. Orchids - The Lovely Feathers
11. Beautiful Nothing - Danny Michel
12. WinRock Song - Canary Mine
13. It Don't Matter - Matt Mays & El Torpedo
14. We Sweat Blood - Danko Jones
15. To Get Across - Kate Maki
16. Sign Says - These Three Cities
17. It's Not My Fault - John Rowley/Taryn Manning (Acoustic)
