= Boomkat =

American musical duo

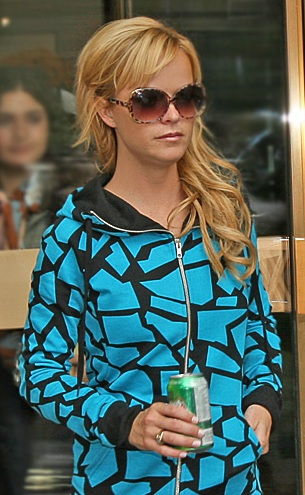
- Taryn Manning (2007)

Background information
- Also known as: BoomKAT
- Origin: Upper Darby, Pennsylvania, U.S.
- Genres: Pop rock, electropop, dance-pop, pop, hip hop
- Years active: 2002-present
- Labels: DreamWorks (2002–2004); Little Vanilla (2007–present)
- Members: Kellin Manning; Taryn Manning
- Website: Tarynmanning.com

Boomkat is an American electronic and pop duo, with siblings Kellin and Taryn Manning. The group released their debut album Boomkatalog.One in 2003, and their second album A Million Trillion Stars in 2009. The first single "The Wreckoning" hit No. 1 on the Hot Dance Music/Club Play chart.

== Background ==
Boomkat is the result of many different influences, "everything from The Beatles to A Tribe Called Quest to Motown to Depeche Mode to Oasis," said Kellin Manning.

== History ==
The band first signed a major label deal with American Idol producer Randy Jackson, but the deal fell through for unknown reasons. In an interview in October 2005's issue of Nylon, Taryn mentioned that Boomkat would be back eventually, and that she is writing songs for the new album once they find another record label.

After a break from music, Boomkat released their first single in four years, called "Runaway." The music video premiered on their official YouTube channel and Taryn Manning's Myspace page on April 8, 2008. In June 2008 Boomkat's second album A Million Trillion Stars became available in online stores. Boomkat was set to perform at Indie Fest USA 2008 on August 15, 2008 to support their album's promotion, but had to cancel the concert due to "family trouble" as Taryn Manning wrote in Myspace. On March 3, 2009, their official first single, "Run Boy" was released along with a music video. The single premiered on People.com and received generally positive reviews.

A Million Trillion Stars was officially released in stores on March 10, 2009 by independent record company, Little Vanilla Records. Boomkat's record company, Little Vanilla Records is owned by Taryn Manning. Their second single, "Stomp" along with a music video was released on July 21, 2009. Boomkat has also filmed an unofficial music video for their song "Don't Be So Shy". The music video premiered on their official YouTube channel on September 2, 2009. Boomkat toured in 2008 and 2009 to promote their new album. Boomkat's song "Burn" was featured on MTV's reality television show, The Hills on October 27, 2009.

In September 2009, Taryn Manning released her first solo single, "So Talented". On October 28, 2009, she announced that Boomkat is working on their 3rd album.

The band's 5th music video from A Million Trillion Stars premiered on Myspace on February 17, 2010.

== Band members ==
- Taryn Manning (2003–present)
- Kellin Manning (2003–present)

=== Live band members ===
- Jeremy Faccone
- Ryan Walker
- Front Row

== Discography ==
- Boomkatalog.One (2003)
- A Million Trillion Stars (2008)

== See also ==
- List of number-one dance hits (United States)
- List of artists who reached number one on the U.S. dance chart
