= 81st Golden Globe Awards =

Film award ceremony in 2024

- Official poster
- Date: January 7, 2024
- Site: The Beverly Hilton, Beverly Hills, California, U.S.
- Hosted by: Jo Koy
- Directed by: Glenn Weiss

Highlights
- Best Film: Drama: Oppenheimer
- Best Film: Musical or Comedy: Poor Things
- Best Drama Series: Succession
- Best Musical or Comedy Series: The Bear
- Best Miniseries or Television movie: Beef
- Most awards: Film: Oppenheimer (5); TV: Succession (4)
- Most nominations: Film: Barbie (9); TV: Succession (9)

Television coverage
- Network: CBS; Paramount+ (streaming)
- Ratings: 10 million (Nielsen ratings)

The 81st Golden Globe Awards was an awards ceremony for film and American television productions of 2023. It was broadcast live on January 7, 2024, from the Beverly Hilton in Beverly Hills, California, beginning at 5:00 p.m. PST / 8:00 p.m. EST, on CBS and streamed on Paramount+ in the United States. It was produced by Dick Clark Productions, Ricky Kirshner, and Glenn Weiss; the latter also served as director. This was the first ceremony after Dick Clark Productions and Eldridge Industries took full control of the Golden Globes from the Hollywood Foreign Press Association. The ceremony was also the first to air live on CBS in the United States since 1982. Comedian Jo Koy hosted the ceremony.

The nominees were announced on December 11, 2023. Barbie and Succession both tied for the most nominations with nine each, followed by Oppenheimer's eight.

The ceremony also featured the debut of two new categories: "Cinematic and Box Office Achievement" and "Best Performance in Stand-Up Comedy on Television"

Additionally, the cultural phenomenon of "Barbenheimer" received seventeen nominations, winning seven.

== Ceremony information ==
This was the first Golden Globe Awards ceremony after the Hollywood Foreign Press Association (HFPA) disbanded in 2023. On June 12, 2023, the HFPA announced that all of its rights and properties related to the Golden Globes were acquired by Dick Clark Productions and Eldridge Industries.

On February 21, 2023, the date of the ceremony was announced. It came back on a Sunday night slot after being moved to Tuesday for the previous year. On September 18, 2023, Glenn Weiss and Ricky Kirshner were announced as its executive producers and showrunners. On November 17, 2023, it was announced that CBS had acquired the broadcast rights to the ceremony, replacing the Golden Globes' long-time U.S. broadcast partner NBC.

The nominations were announced on December 11, 2023, during an event co-hosted by Cedric the Entertainer and Wilmer Valderrama. Most of the categories were revealed during a live-streaming presentation, while ten of the categories were revealed during another segment on CBS Mornings.

On December 21, comedian and actor Jo Koy was announced as the host. Before this announcement, it was reported that a source with knowledge of the conversations told CNN that at least five A-list comedic actors, including Chris Rock and Ali Wong, declined offers to host; the hosts of the podcast SmartLess (actors Will Arnett, Jason Bateman, and Sean Hayes) also reportedly declined the offer. That same month, TheWrap reported that 64 voters threatened to withhold their final-round votes in protest, after being told that they would not be given tickets to the ceremony.

With the awards no longer being overseen by the HFPA, a new, racially and ethnically diverse group of voters consisting of 300 journalists representing 76 countries selected the 2023 nominees and winners.

For her portrayal of Mollie Burkhart in Killers of the Flower Moon, Lily Gladstone became the first Indigenous actor to win a Golden Globe Award, winning for Best Actress in a Motion Picture – Drama.

=== Expansion ===
On September 26, 2023, it was announced that two new categories would be added for the upcoming ceremony: "Cinematic and Box Office Achievement" (a category for films that grossed at least $100 million domestically and $150 million worldwide) and "Best Performance in Stand-Up Comedy on Television" (also known as "Best Stand-Up Comedian on Television"). Some critics felt that the new categories were an attempt to improve the ceremony's viewership and relevance, with comparisons drawn to the Academy Awards' attempt to introduce a category for "Popular Film" in 2018.

=== Reduction ===
The two Lifetime Achievement Awards (the Cecil B. DeMille Award and the Carol Burnett Award) were not presented this year, but expected to return in the future. Executive Vice President Tim Gray explained that with the change in ownership and status, and 25 of the competitive categories expanding from 5 nominees to 6, the increase will also include a reduction with no presentation of the two aforementioned awards for this year. "This is not a permanent change, with future awards slated to be given," Gray wrote in a post on the Globes' official website.

== Winners and nominees ==
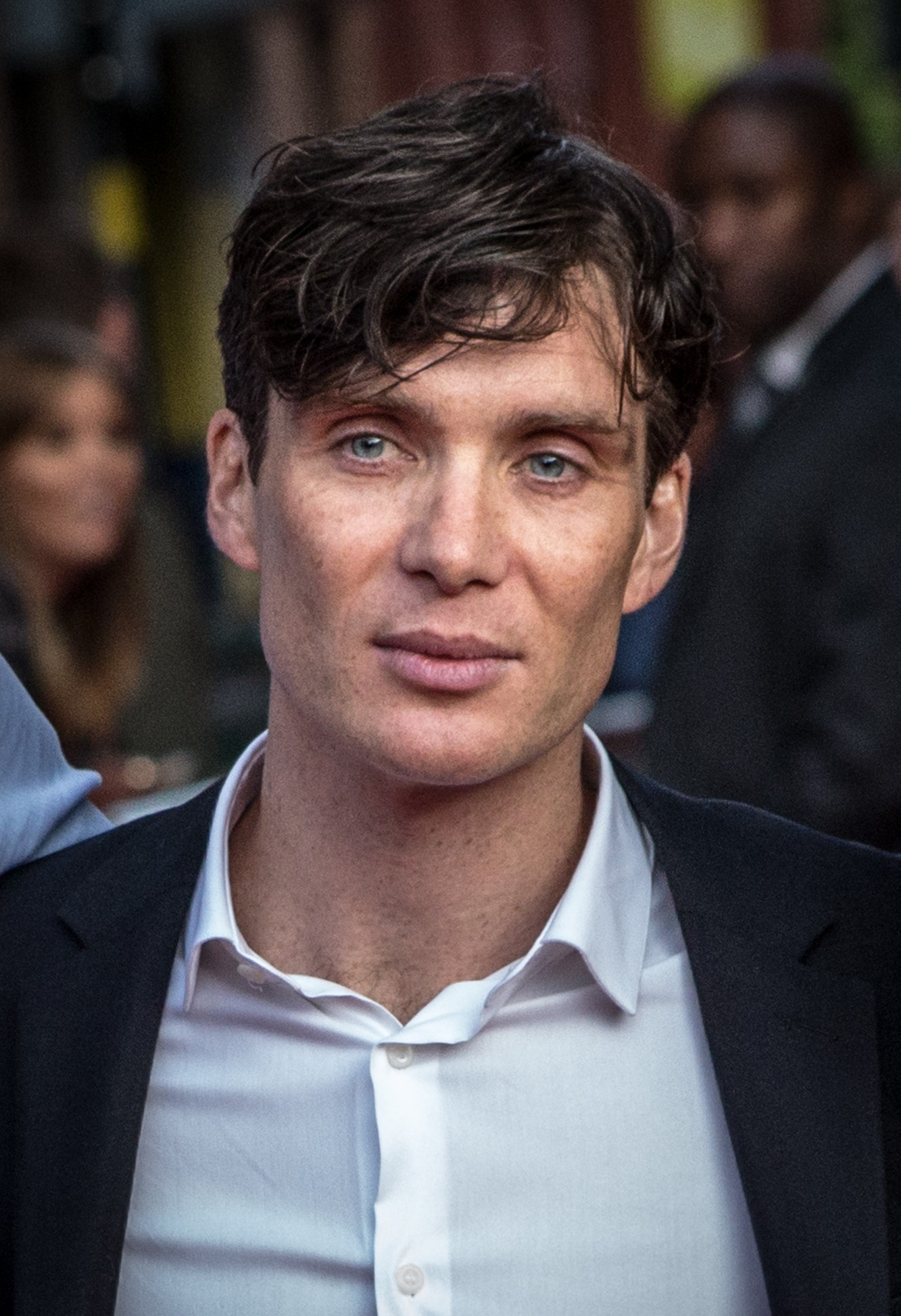
Cillian Murphy, Best Actor in a Motion Picture – Drama winner

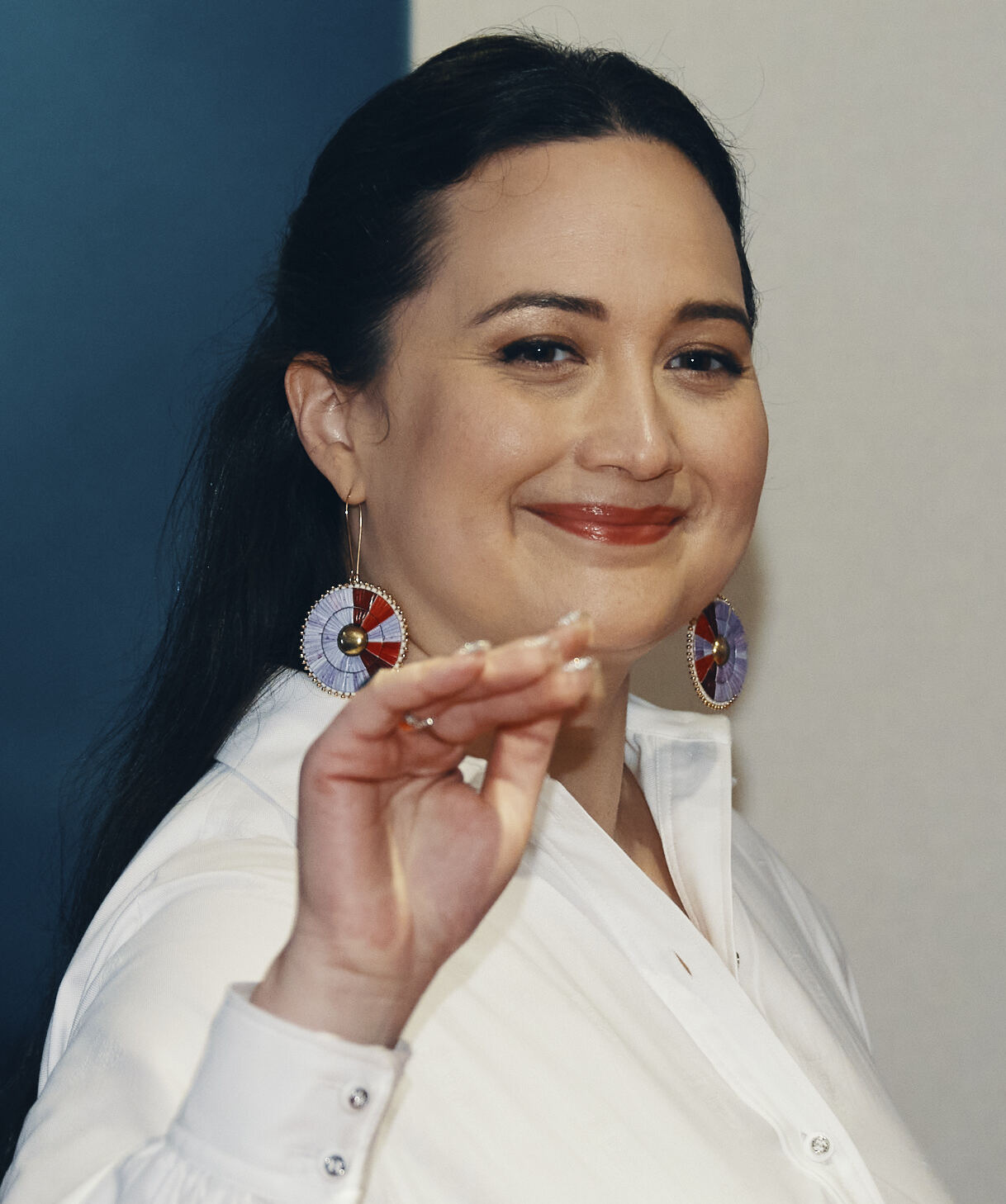
Lily Gladstone, Best Actress in a Motion Picture – Drama winner

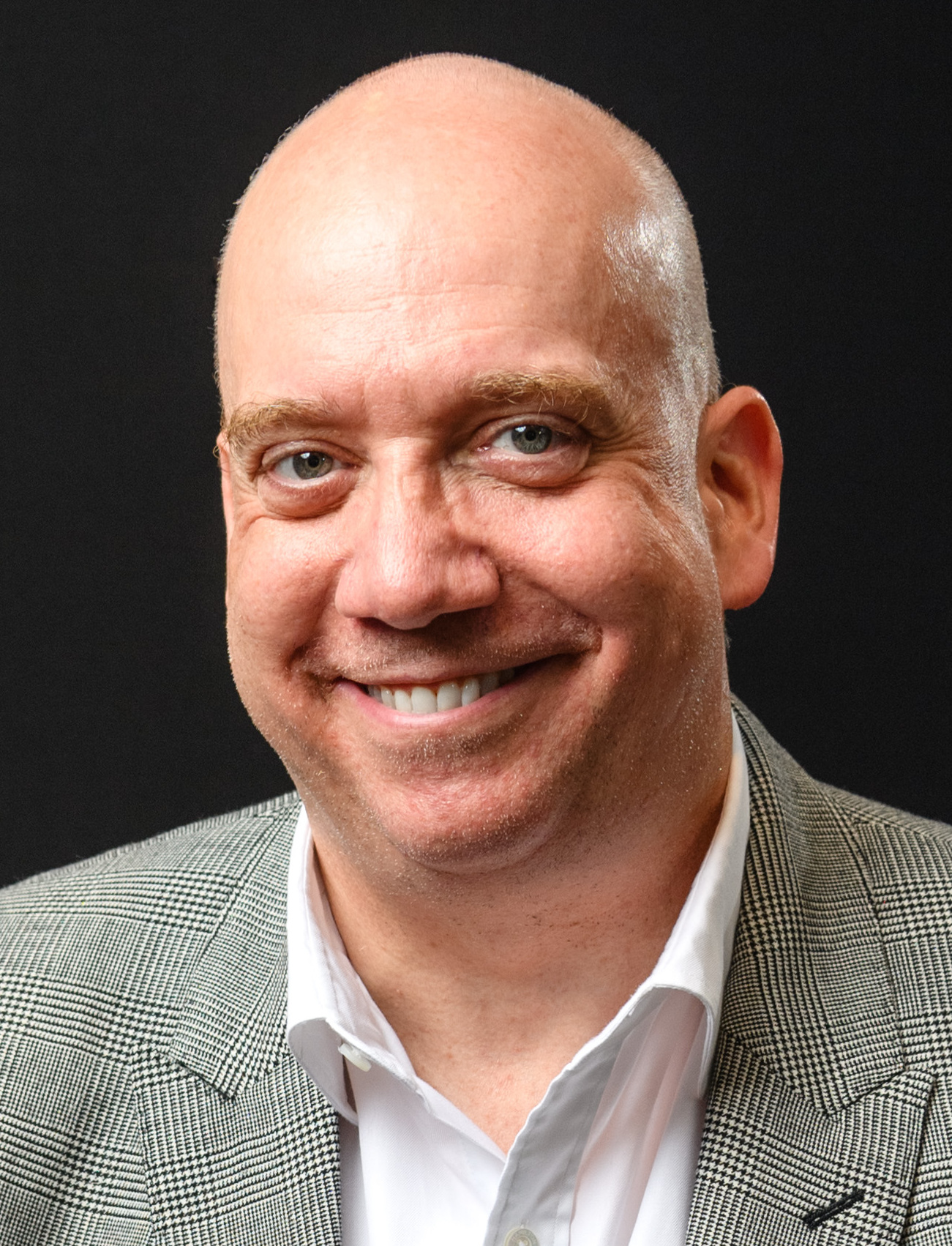
Paul Giamatti, Best Actor in a Motion Picture – Musical or Comedy winner

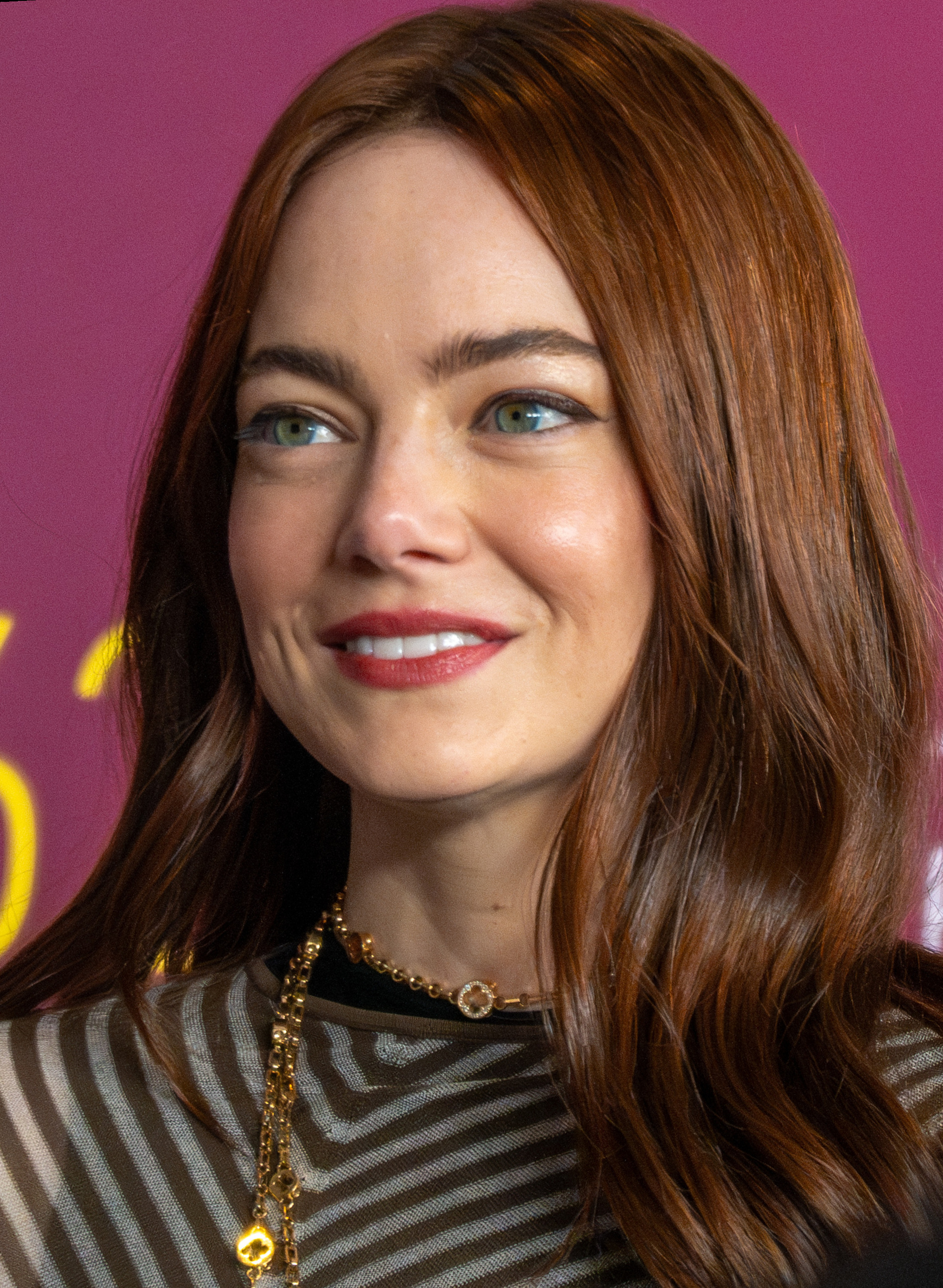
Emma Stone, Best Actress in a Motion Picture – Musical or Comedy winner

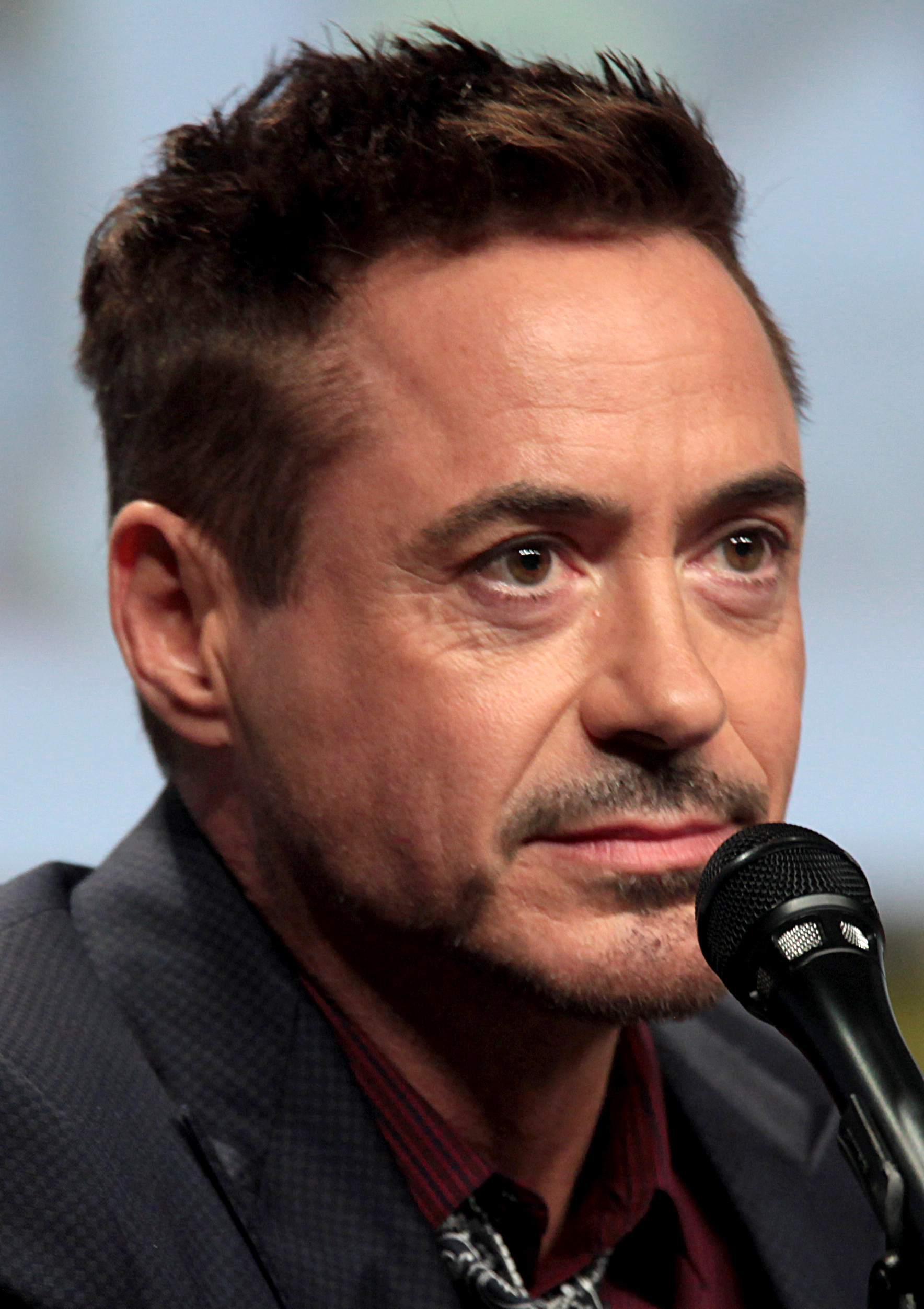
Robert Downey Jr., Best Supporting Actor winner

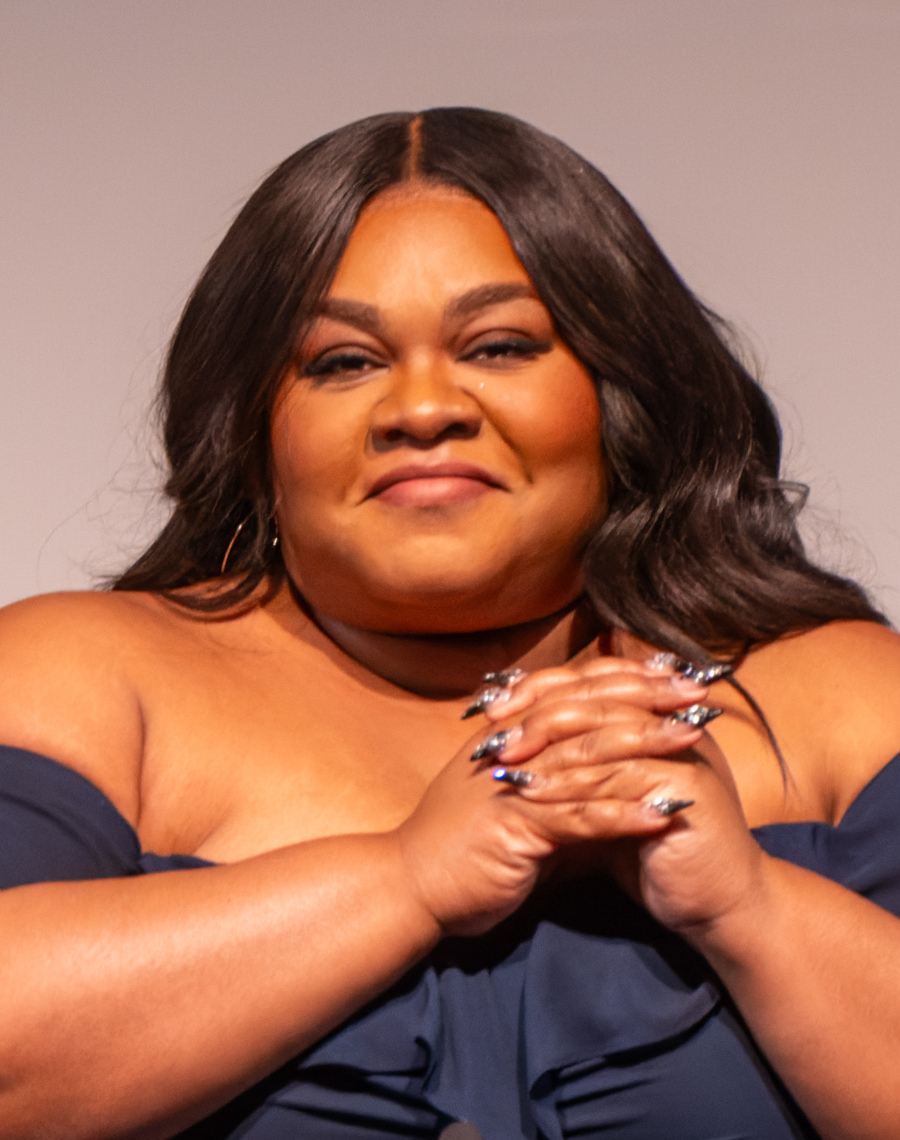
Da'Vine Joy Randolph, Best Supporting Actress winner

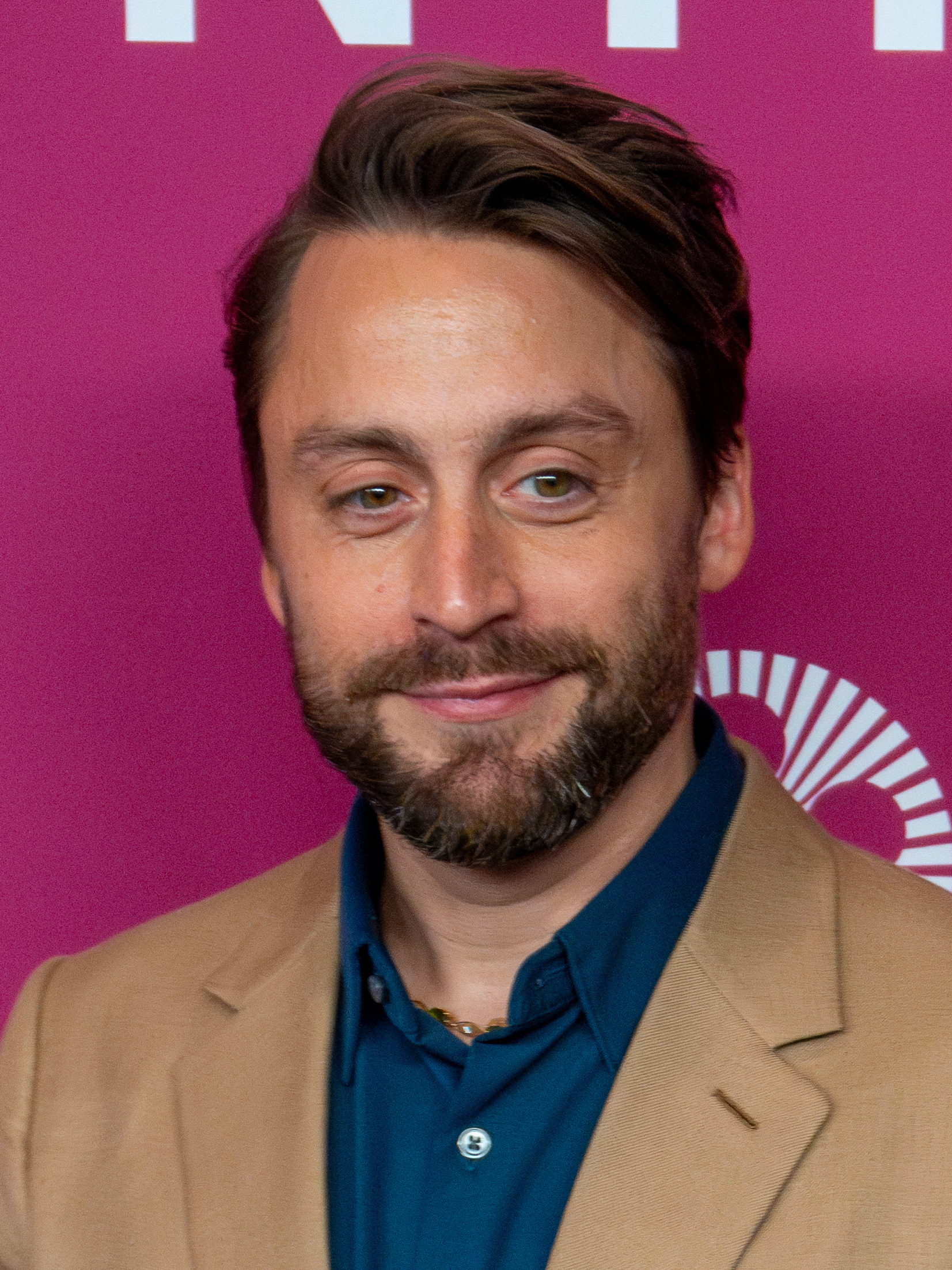
Kieran Culkin, Best Actor in a Television Series – Drama winner

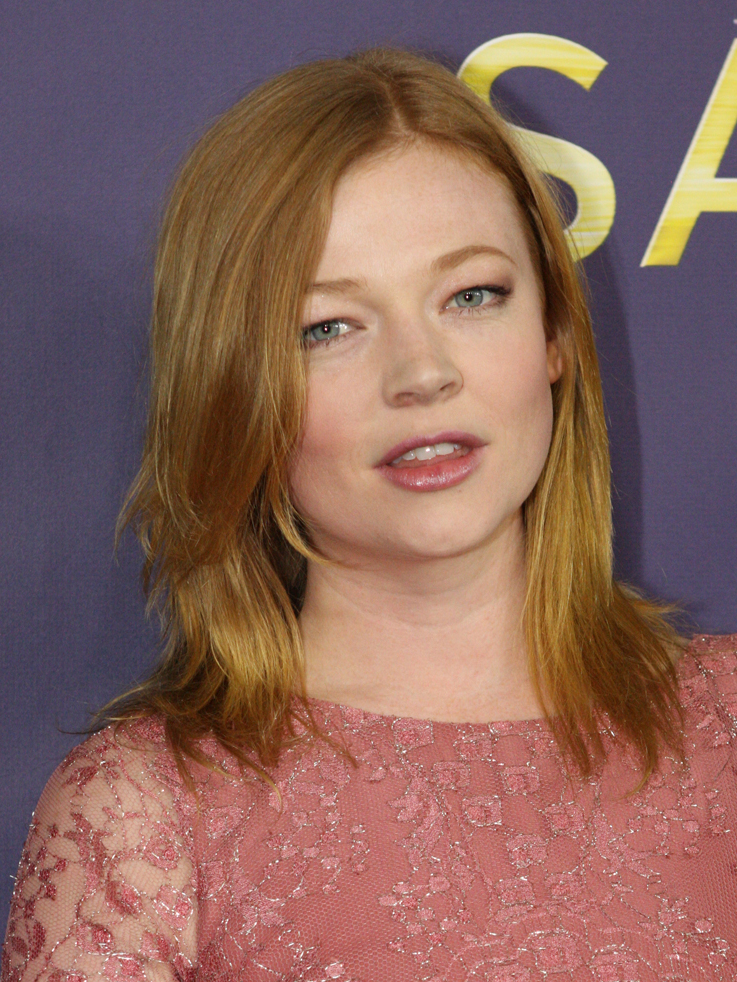
Sarah Snook, Best Actress in a Television Series – Drama winner

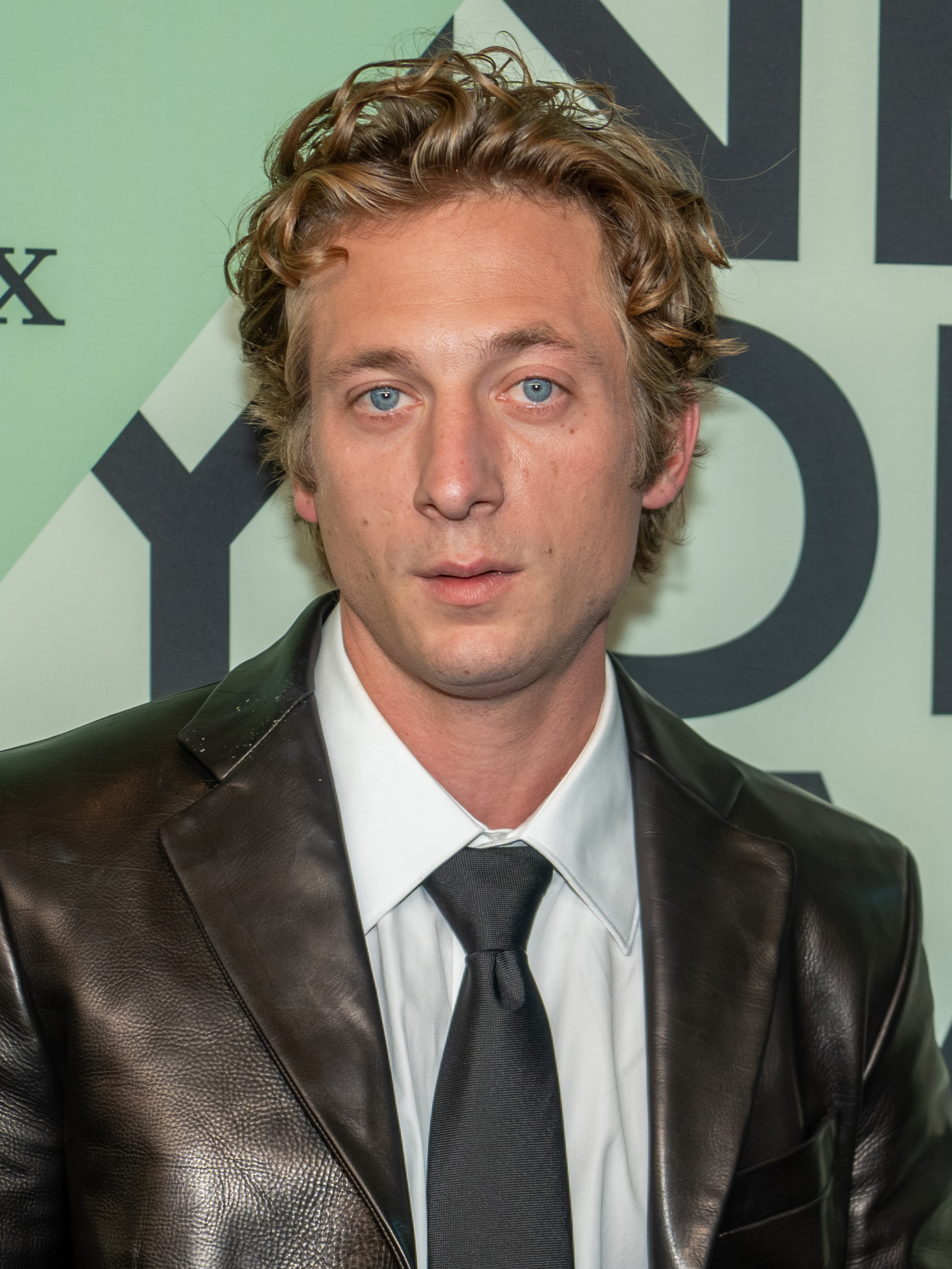
Jeremy Allen White, Best Actor in a Television Series – Musical or Comedy winner

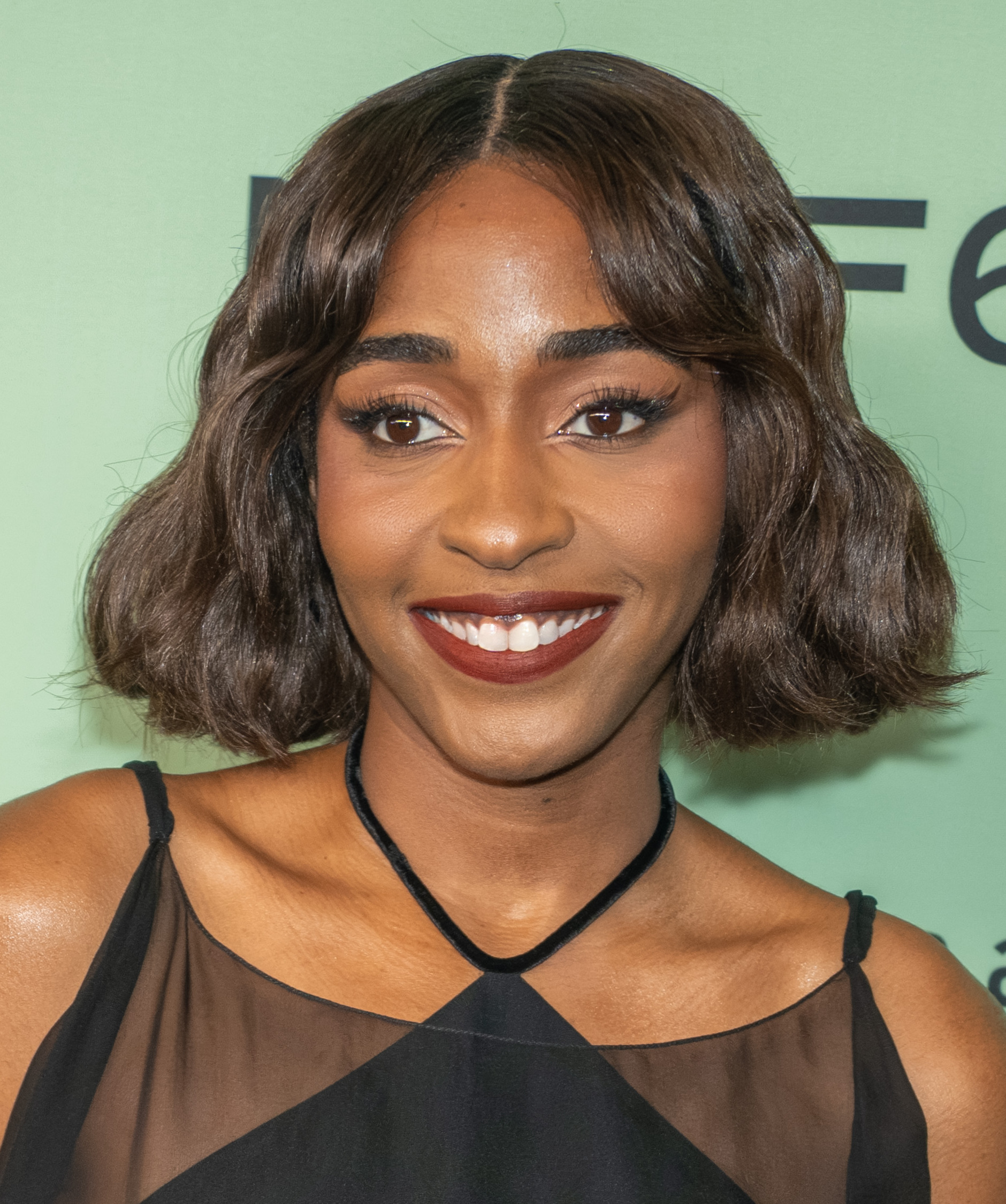
Ayo Edebiri, Best Actress in a Television Series – Musical or Comedy winner

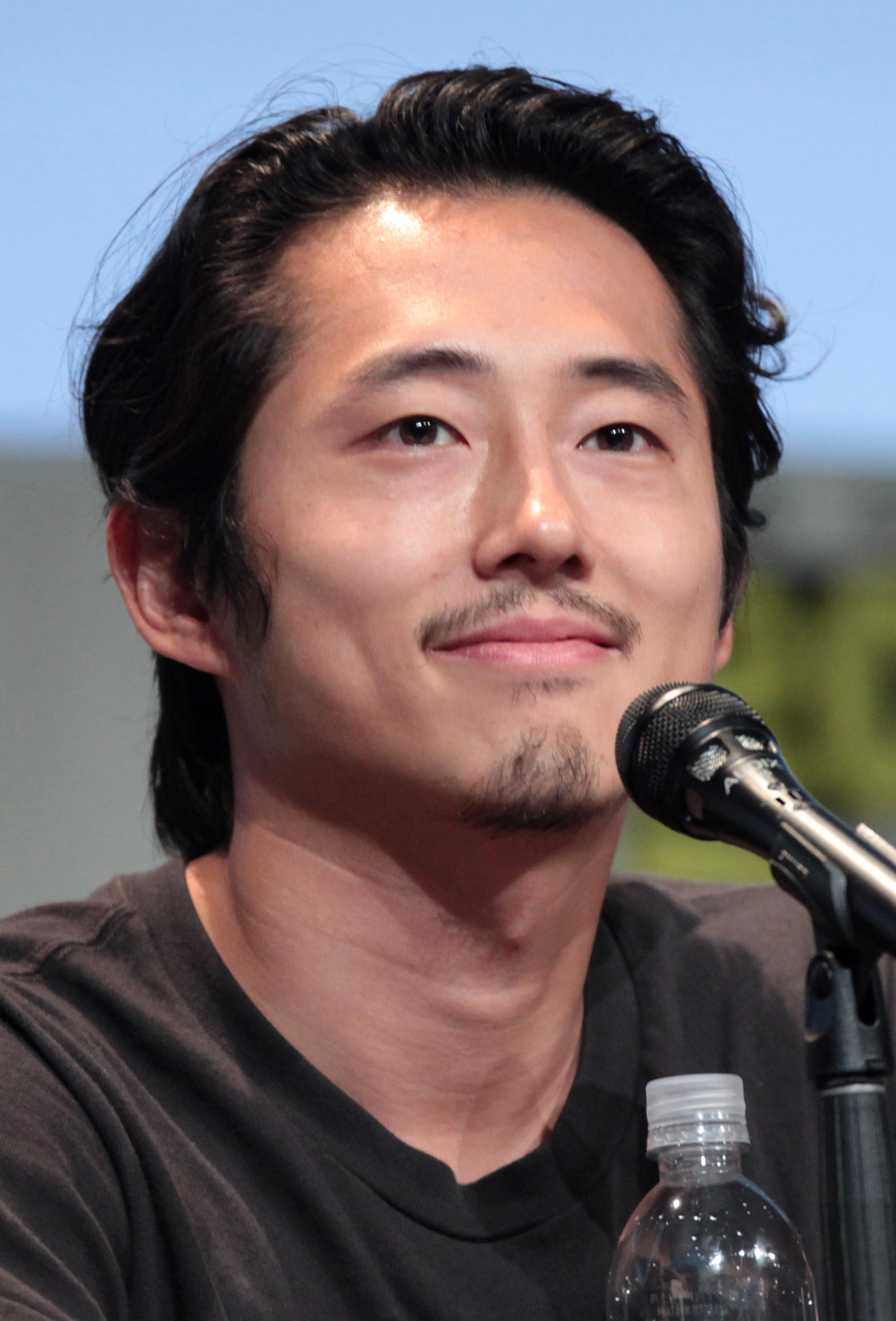
Steven Yeun, Best Actor in a Limited Series, Anthology Series, or Motion Picture Made for Television winner

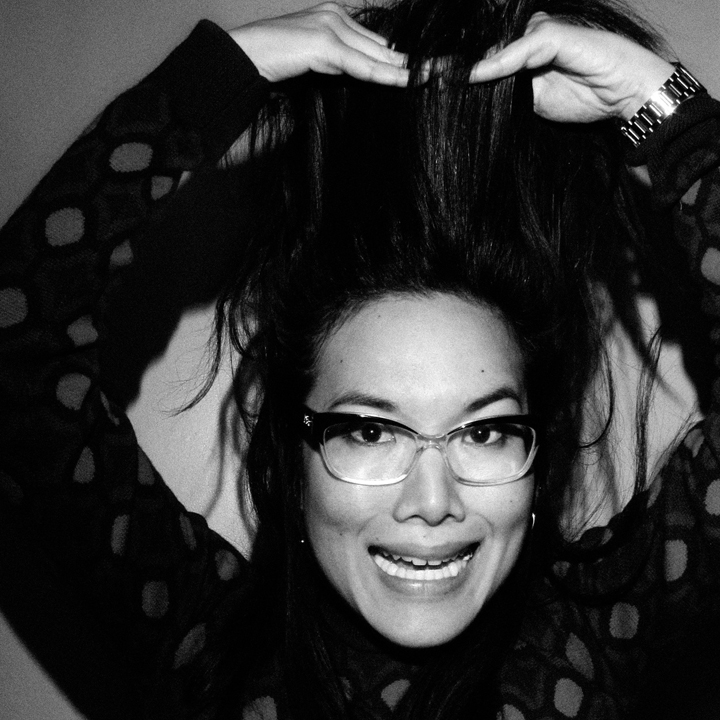
Ali Wong, Best Actress in a Limited Series, Anthology Series, or Motion Picture Made for Television winner

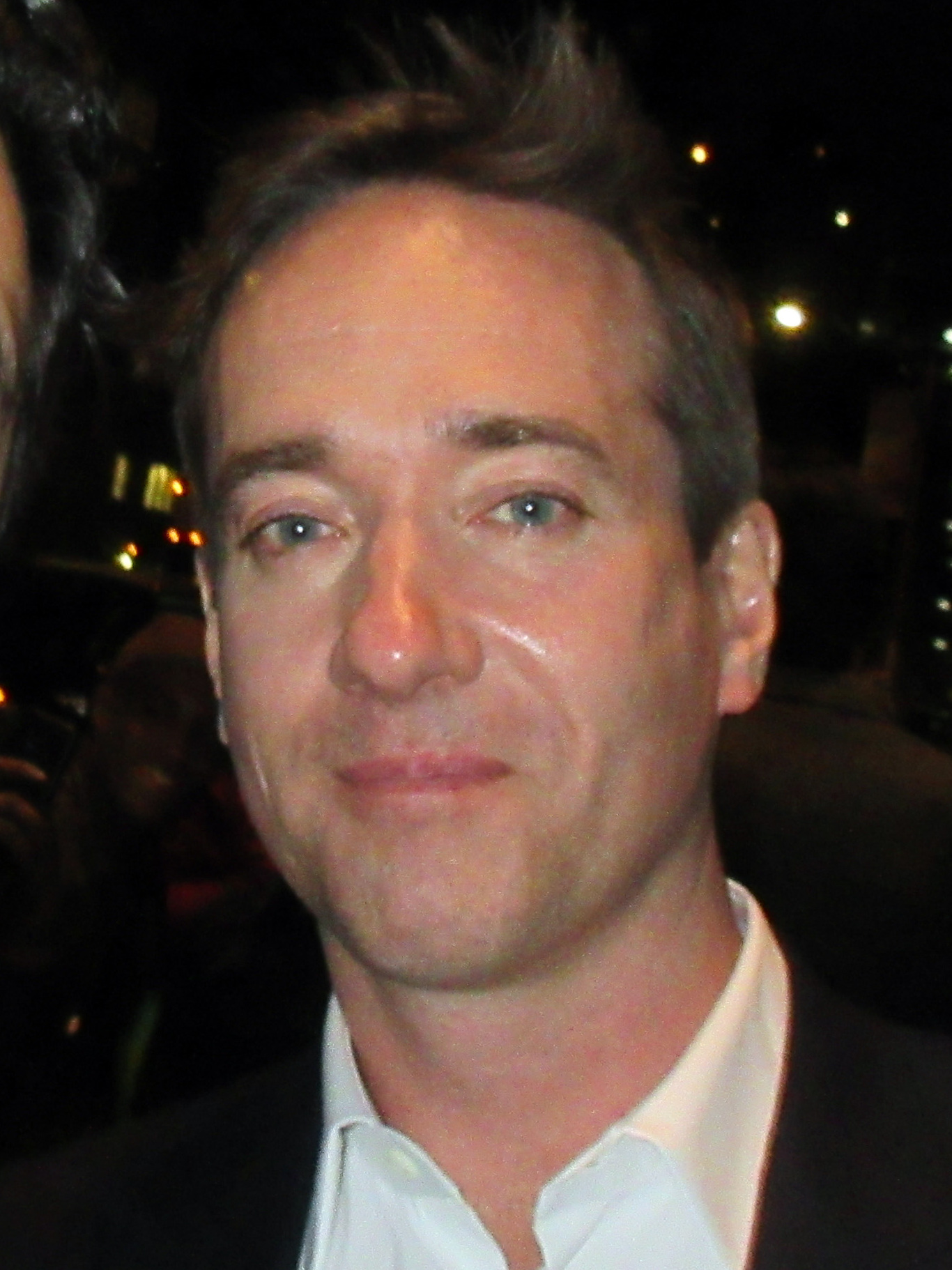
Matthew Macfadyen, Best Supporting Actor in a Series, Limited Series, Anthology Series, or Motion Picture Made for Television winner

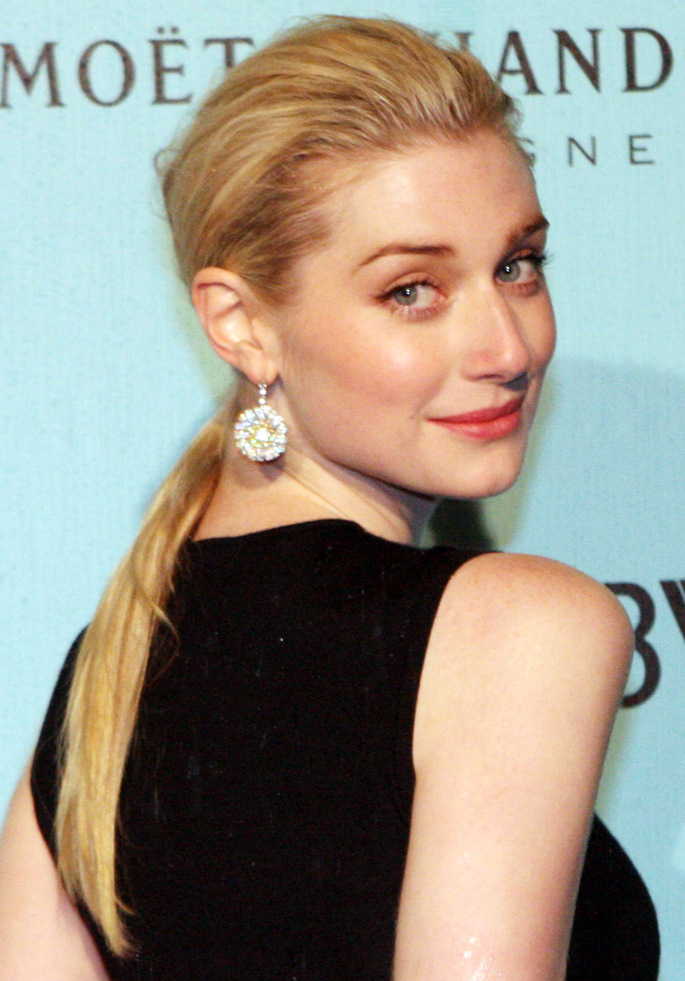
Elizabeth Debicki, Best Supporting Actress in a Series, Limited Series, Anthology Series, or Motion Picture Made for Television winner

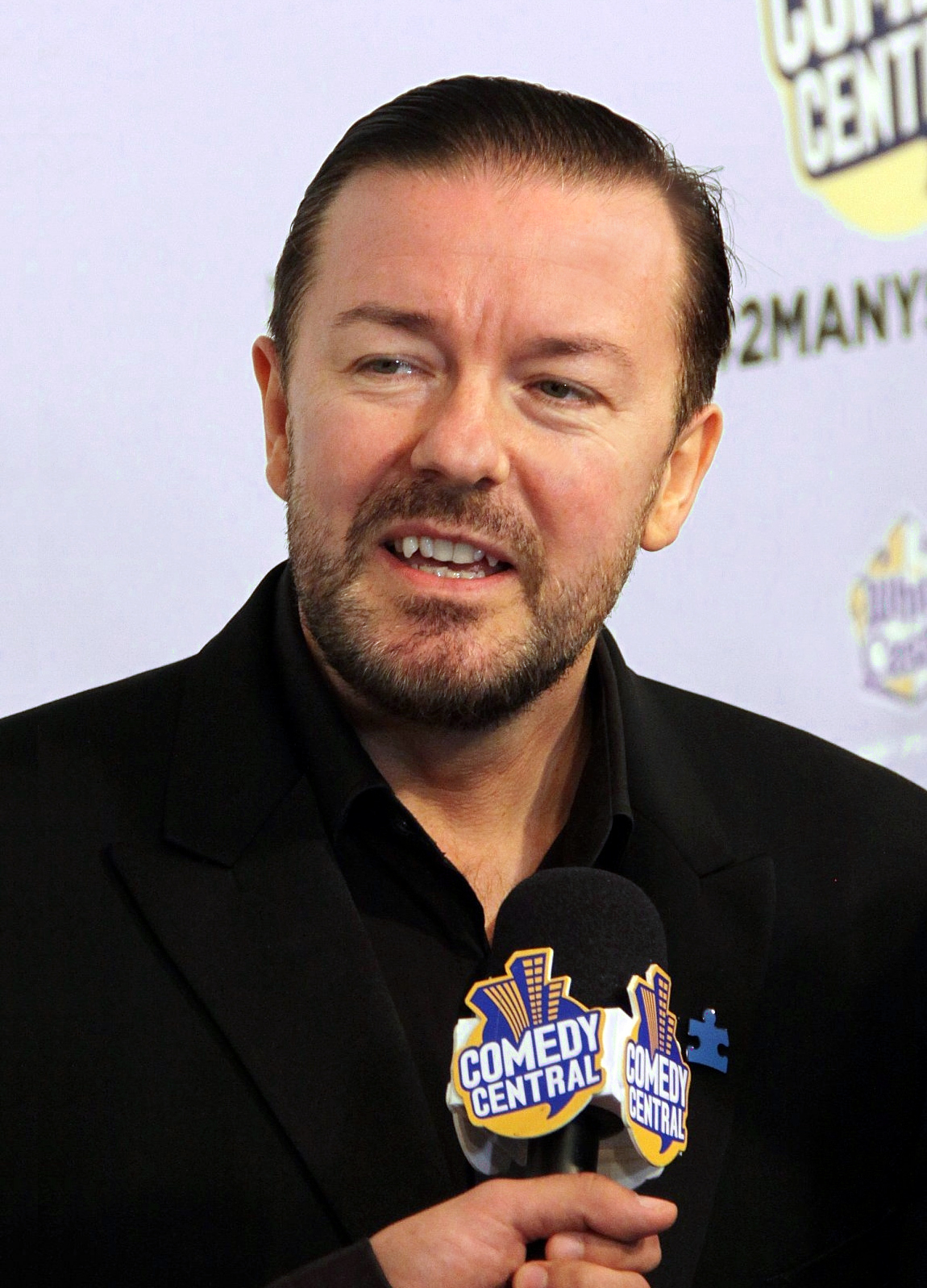
Ricky Gervais, Best Stand-Up Comedian on Television winner

=== Film ===
Best Motion Picture – Drama: Oppenheimer; Anatomy of a Fall; Killers of the Flower Moon; Maestro; Past Lives; The Zone of Interest	Best Motion Picture – Musical or Comedy: Poor Things; Air; American Fiction; Barbie; The Holdovers; May December
Best Motion Picture – Animated: The Boy and the Heron; Elemental; Spider-Man: Across the Spider-Verse; The Super Mario Bros. Movie; Suzume; Wish	Best Motion Picture – Non-English Language: Anatomy of a Fall (France); Fallen Leaves (Finland); Io capitano (Italy); Past Lives (United States); Society of the Snow (Spain); The Zone of Interest (United Kingdom / Poland / United States)
Best Actor in a Motion Picture – Drama: Cillian Murphy – Oppenheimer as J. Robert Oppenheimer; Bradley Cooper – Maestro as Leonard Bernstein; Leonardo DiCaprio – Killers of the Flower Moon as Ernest Burkhart; Colman Domingo – Rustin as Bayard Rustin; Barry Keoghan – Saltburn as Oliver Quick; Andrew Scott – All of Us Strangers as Adam	Best Actress in a Motion Picture – Drama: Lily Gladstone – Killers of the Flower Moon as Mollie Burkhart; Annette Bening – Nyad as Diana Nyad; Sandra Hüller – Anatomy of a Fall as Sandra Voyter; Greta Lee – Past Lives as Nora Moon; Carey Mulligan – Maestro as Felicia Montealegre; Cailee Spaeny – Priscilla as Priscilla Presley
Best Actor in a Motion Picture – Musical or Comedy: Paul Giamatti – The Holdovers as Paul Hunham; Nicolas Cage – Dream Scenario as Dr. Paul Matthews; Timothée Chalamet – Wonka as Willy Wonka; Matt Damon – Air as Sonny Vaccaro; Joaquin Phoenix – Beau Is Afraid as Beau Wassermann; Jeffrey Wright – American Fiction as Thelonious "Monk" Ellis	Best Actress in a Motion Picture – Musical or Comedy: Emma Stone – Poor Things as Bella Baxter; Fantasia Barrino – The Color Purple as Celie Harris-Johnson; Jennifer Lawrence – No Hard Feelings as Maddie Barker; Natalie Portman – May December as Elizabeth Berry; Alma Pöysti – Fallen Leaves as Ansa; Margot Robbie – Barbie as Barbie
Best Supporting Actor in a Motion Picture: Robert Downey Jr. – Oppenheimer as Lewis Strauss; Willem Dafoe – Poor Things as Dr. Godwin Baxter; Robert De Niro – Killers of the Flower Moon as William King Hale; Ryan Gosling – Barbie as Ken; Charles Melton – May December as Joe Yoo; Mark Ruffalo – Poor Things as Duncan Wedderburn	Best Supporting Actress in a Motion Picture: Da'Vine Joy Randolph – The Holdovers as Mary Lamb; Emily Blunt – Oppenheimer as Kitty Oppenheimer; Danielle Brooks – The Color Purple as Sofia; Jodie Foster – Nyad as Bonnie Stoll; Julianne Moore – May December as Gracie Atherton-Yoo; Rosamund Pike – Saltburn as Lady Elspeth Catton
Best Director: Christopher Nolan – Oppenheimer; Bradley Cooper – Maestro; Greta Gerwig – Barbie; Yorgos Lanthimos – Poor Things; Martin Scorsese – Killers of the Flower Moon; Celine Song – Past Lives	Best Screenplay: Justine Triet and Arthur Harari – Anatomy of a Fall; Greta Gerwig and Noah Baumbach – Barbie; Tony McNamara – Poor Things; Christopher Nolan – Oppenheimer; Eric Roth and Martin Scorsese – Killers of the Flower Moon; Celine Song – Past Lives
Best Original Score: Ludwig Göransson – Oppenheimer; Jerskin Fendrix – Poor Things; Joe Hisaishi – The Boy and the Heron; Mica Levi – The Zone of Interest; Daniel Pemberton – Spider-Man: Across the Spider-Verse; Robbie Robertson – Killers of the Flower Moon (posthumous)	Cinematic and Box Office Achievement: Barbie; Guardians of the Galaxy Vol. 3; John Wick: Chapter 4; Mission: Impossible – Dead Reckoning Part One; Oppenheimer; Spider-Man: Across the Spider-Verse; The Super Mario Bros. Movie; Taylor Swift: The Eras Tour
Best Original Song: "What Was I Made For?" (Billie Eilish and Finneas O'Connell) – Barbie; "Addicted to Romance" (Bruce Springsteen) – She Came to Me; "Dance the Night" (Mark Ronson, Andrew Wyatt, Dua Lipa, and Caroline Ailin) – Barbie; "I'm Just Ken" (Mark Ronson and Andrew Wyatt) – Barbie; "Peaches" (Jack Black, Aaron Horvath, Michael Jelenic, Eric Osmond, and John Spiker) – The Super Mario Bros. Movie; "Road to Freedom" (Lenny Kravitz) – Rustin

==== Films with multiple nominations ====
The following films received multiple nominations:

Nominations	Films	Category	Distributor(s)
9	Barbie	M/C	Warner Bros. Pictures
8	Oppenheimer	Drama	Universal Pictures
7	Killers of the Flower Moon	Drama	Paramount Pictures; Apple Original Films
7	Poor Things	M/C	Searchlight Pictures
5	Past Lives	Drama	A24
4	Anatomy of a Fall	Drama	Neon
4	Maestro	Drama	Netflix
4	May December	M/C	Netflix
3	The Holdovers	M/C	Focus Features
3	Spider-Man: Across the Spider-Verse	Animated	Sony Pictures Releasing
3	The Super Mario Bros. Movie	Animated	Universal Pictures
3	The Zone of Interest	Drama	A24
2	Air	M/C	Amazon MGM Studios
2	American Fiction	M/C	Amazon MGM Studios
2	The Boy and the Heron	Animated	GKIDS
2	The Color Purple	M/C	Warner Bros. Pictures
2	Fallen Leaves	M/C	MUBI
2	Nyad	Drama	Netflix
2	Rustin	Drama	Netflix
2	Saltburn	Drama	Amazon MGM Studios

==== Films with multiple wins ====
The following films received multiple wins:

Wins	Films	Category	Distributor
5	Oppenheimer	Drama	Universal Pictures
2	Anatomy of a Fall	Drama	Neon
2	Barbie	M/C	Warner Bros. Pictures
2	The Holdovers	M/C	Focus Features
2	Poor Things	M/C	Searchlight Pictures

=== Television ===
Best Television Series – Drama: Succession (HBO); 1923 (Paramount+); The Crown (Netflix); The Diplomat (Netflix); The Last of Us (HBO); The Morning Show (Apple TV+)	Best Television Series – Musical or Comedy: The Bear (FX / Hulu); Abbott Elementary (ABC); Barry (HBO); Jury Duty (Amazon Freevee); Only Murders in the Building (Hulu); Ted Lasso (Apple TV+)
Best Limited Series, Anthology Series, or Motion Picture Made for Television: Beef (Netflix); All the Light We Cannot See (Netflix); Daisy Jones & the Six (Prime Video); Fargo (FX); Fellow Travelers (Showtime); Lessons in Chemistry (Apple TV+)	Best Performance in Stand-Up Comedy on Television: Ricky Gervais – Ricky Gervais: Armageddon (Netflix); Trevor Noah – Trevor Noah: Where Was I (Netflix); Chris Rock – Chris Rock: Selective Outrage (Netflix); Amy Schumer – Amy Schumer: Emergency Contact (Netflix); Sarah Silverman – Sarah Silverman: Someone You Love (HBO); Wanda Sykes – Wanda Sykes: I'm an Entertainer (Netflix)
Best Actor in a Television Series – Drama: Kieran Culkin – Succession (HBO) as Roman Roy; Brian Cox – Succession (HBO) as Logan Roy; Gary Oldman – Slow Horses (Apple TV+) as Jackson Lamb; Pedro Pascal – The Last of Us (HBO) as Joel Miller; Jeremy Strong – Succession (HBO) as Kendall Roy; Dominic West – The Crown (Netflix) as Charles, Prince of Wales	Best Actress in a Television Series – Drama: Sarah Snook – Succession (HBO) as Siobhan "Shiv" Roy; Helen Mirren – 1923 (Paramount+) as Cara Dutton; Bella Ramsey – The Last of Us (HBO) as Ellie; Keri Russell – The Diplomat (Netflix) as Katherine "Kate" Wyler; Imelda Staunton – The Crown (Netflix) as Queen Elizabeth II; Emma Stone – The Curse (Showtime) as Whitney Siegel
Best Actor in a Television Series – Musical or Comedy: Jeremy Allen White – The Bear (FX / Hulu) as Carmen "Carmy" Berzatto; Bill Hader – Barry (HBO) as Barry Berkman; Steve Martin – Only Murders in the Building (Hulu) as Charles-Haden Savage; Jason Segel – Shrinking (Apple TV+) as Jimmy Laird; Martin Short – Only Murders in the Building (Hulu) as Oliver Putnam; Jason Sudeikis – Ted Lasso (Apple TV+) as Ted Lasso	Best Actress in a Television Series – Musical or Comedy: Ayo Edebiri – The Bear (FX / Hulu) as Sydney Adamu; Rachel Brosnahan – The Marvelous Mrs. Maisel (Prime Video) as Miriam "Midge" Maisel; Quinta Brunson – Abbott Elementary (ABC) as Janine Teagues; Elle Fanning – The Great (Hulu) as Catherine the Great; Selena Gomez – Only Murders in the Building (Hulu) as Mabel Mora; Natasha Lyonne – Poker Face (Peacock) as Charlie Cale
Best Actor in a Limited Series, Anthology Series, or Motion Picture Made for Television: Steven Yeun – Beef (Netflix) as Danny Cho; Matt Bomer – Fellow Travelers (Showtime) as Hawkins "Hawk" Fuller; Sam Claflin – Daisy Jones & the Six (Prime Video) as Billy Dunne; Jon Hamm – Fargo (FX) as Sheriff Roy Tillman; Woody Harrelson – White House Plumbers (HBO) as E. Howard Hunt; David Oyelowo – Lawmen: Bass Reeves (Paramount+) as Bass Reeves	Best Actress in a Limited Series, Anthology Series, or Motion Picture Made for Television: Ali Wong – Beef (Netflix) as Amy Lau; Riley Keough – Daisy Jones & the Six (Prime Video) as Daisy Jones; Brie Larson – Lessons in Chemistry (Apple TV+) as Elizabeth Zott; Elizabeth Olsen – Love & Death (Max) as Candy Montgomery; Juno Temple – Fargo (FX) as Dorothy "Dot" Lyon; Rachel Weisz – Dead Ringers (Prime Video) as Beverly Mantle / Elliot Mantle
Best Supporting Actor on Television: Matthew Macfadyen – Succession (HBO) as Tom Wambsgans; Billy Crudup – The Morning Show (Apple TV+) as Cory Ellison; James Marsden – Jury Duty (Amazon Freevee) as Himself; Ebon Moss-Bachrach – The Bear (FX / Hulu) as Richard "Richie" Jerimovich; Alan Ruck – Succession (HBO) as Connor Roy; Alexander Skarsgård – Succession (HBO) as Lukas Matsson	Best Supporting Actress on Television: Elizabeth Debicki – The Crown (Netflix) as Diana, Princess of Wales; Abby Elliott – The Bear (FX / Hulu) as Natalie Berzatto; Christina Ricci – Yellowjackets (Showtime) as Misty Quigley; J. Smith-Cameron – Succession (HBO) as Gerri Kellman; Meryl Streep – Only Murders in the Building (Hulu) as Loretta Durkin; Hannah Waddingham – Ted Lasso (Apple TV+) as Rebecca Welton

==== Series with multiple nominations ====
The following television series received multiple nominations:

Nominations	Series	Category	Distributor(s)
9	Succession	Drama	HBO
5	The Bear	M/C	FX / Hulu
5	Only Murders in the Building	M/C	Hulu
4	The Crown	Drama	Netflix
3	Beef	LAMP	Netflix
3	Daisy Jones & the Six	LAMP	Prime Video
3	Fargo	LAMP	FX
3	The Last of Us	Drama	HBO
3	Ted Lasso	M/C	Apple TV+
2	1923	Drama	Paramount+
2	Abbott Elementary	M/C	ABC
2	Barry	M/C	HBO
2	The Diplomat	Drama	Netflix
2	Fellow Travelers	LAMP	Showtime
2	Jury Duty	M/C	Amazon Freevee
2	Lessons in Chemistry	LAMP	Apple TV+
2	The Morning Show	Drama	Apple TV+

==== Series with multiple wins ====
The following series received multiple wins:

Wins	Series	Category	Distributor(s)
4	Succession	Drama	HBO
3	The Bear	M/C	FX / Hulu
3	Beef	LAMP	Netflix

== Presenters ==
Name(s)	Role
Jared Leto; Angela Bassett	Presented the awards for Best Supporting Actress – Motion Picture and Best Supporting Actor – Motion Picture
Orlando Bloom; Amanda Seyfried	Presented the award for Best Actress – Limited Series, Anthology Series, or Motion Picture Made for Television
Hunter Schafer; Justin Hartley	Presented the award for Best Actor – Limited Series, Anthology Series, or Motion Picture Made for Television
Jonathan Bailey; Julia Garner	Presented the award for Best Supporting Actress – Limited Series, Anthology Series, or Motion Picture Made for Television
Keri Russell; Ray Romano	Presented the award for Best Supporting Actor – Limited Series, Anthology Series, or Motion Picture Made for Television
Shameik Moore; Hailee Steinfeld; Daniel Kaluuya	Presented the award for Best Screenplay
George Lopez; Gabriel Iglesias	Presented the award for Best Actor in a Television Series – Musical or Comedy
Jim Gaffigan	Presented the award for Best Performance in Stand-Up Comedy on Television
Rose McIver; Utkarsh Ambudkar	Presented the award for Best Motion Picture – Non-English Language
Kevin Costner; America Ferrera	Presented the awards for Best Actress in a Television Series – Musical or Comedy and Best Actor in a Television Series – Drama
Natalie Portman; Florence Pugh	Presented the award for Best Motion Picture – Animated
Ben Affleck; Matt Damon	Presented the award for Best Director
Michelle Yeoh; Naomi Watts	Presented the awards for Best Actress in a Motion Picture – Musical or Comedy and Best Actor in a Motion Picture – Drama
Jon Batiste; Andra Day	Presented the awards for Best Original Score and Best Original Song
Mark Hamill	Presented the award for Cinematic and Box Office Achievement
Simu Liu; Issa Rae	Presented the awards for Best Limited Series, Anthology Series, or Motion Picture Made for Television and Best Television Series – Musical or Comedy
Dua Lipa; Elizabeth Banks	Presented the award for Best Actress – Television Series Drama
Gabriel Macht; Patrick J. Adams; Sarah Rafferty; Gina Torres	Presented the award for Best Television Series – Drama
Will Ferrell; Kristen Wiig	Presented the award for Best Actor in a Motion Picture – Musical or Comedy
Annette Bening; Jodie Foster	Presented the award for Best Motion Picture – Musical or Comedy
Don Cheadle; Kate Beckinsale	Presented the award for Best Actress in a Motion Picture – Drama
Oprah Winfrey	Presented the award for Best Motion Picture – Drama

== Reception ==
=== Criticism of Jo Koy's opening monologue ===
External videos
- Jo Koy Opening Monologue | 81st Annual Golden Globes

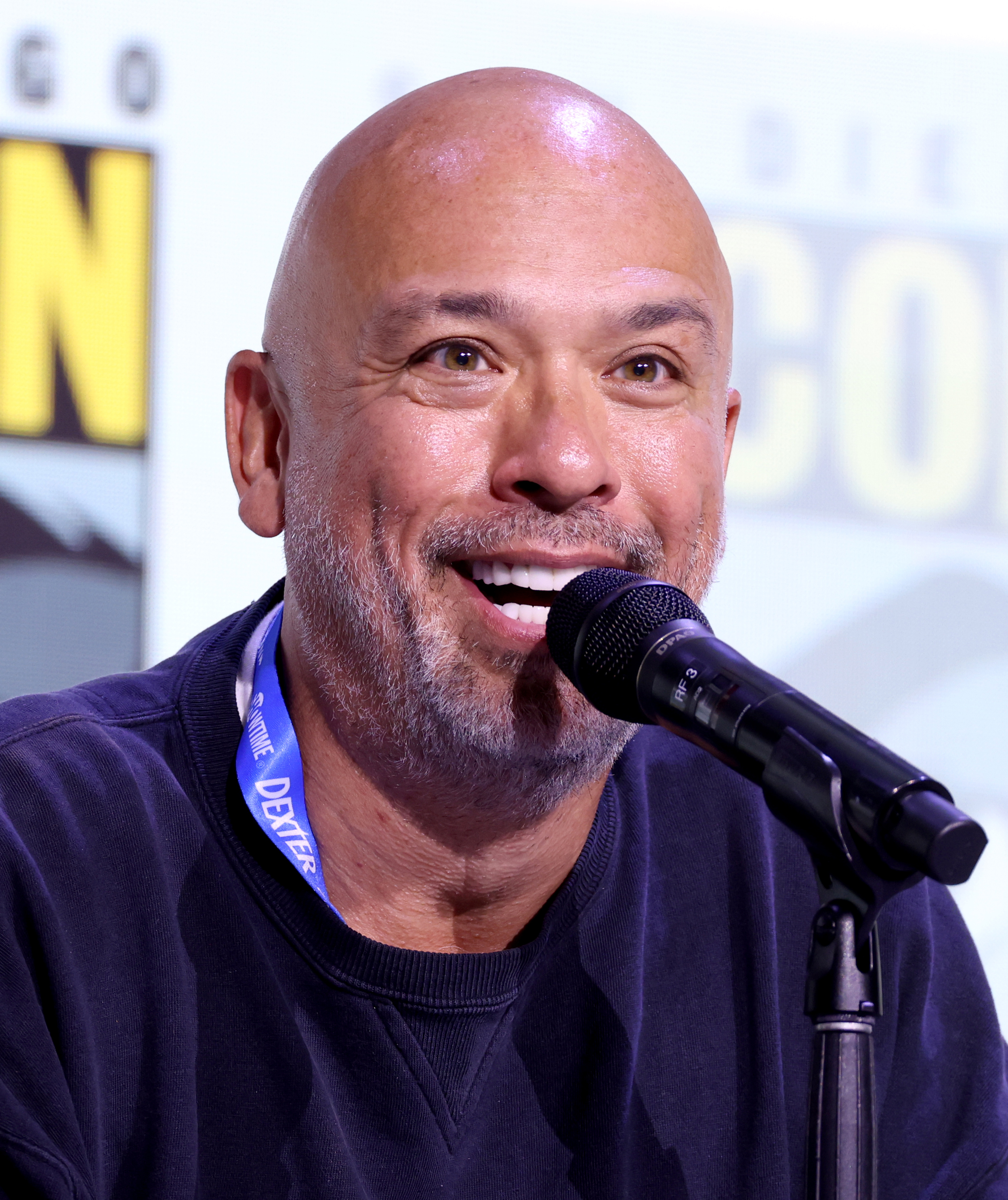
Jo Koy, host of the 81st Golden Globe Awards

Host Jo Koy's opening monologue was met with criticism from viewers and critics with many describing his jokes as "cringeworthy", "painful", and "unfunny". Chelsey Sanchez of Harper's Bazaar described the monologue as "awkward" and "distasteful". Koy was also criticized for putting blame on his writers during the monologue, coming after the lengthy 2023 Writers Guild of America strike. Justin Curto of Vulture noted that when some of his jokes fell flat, Koy "immediately threw his writers under the bus... He yelled. 'Yo, shut up. You're kidding me, right. Slow down. I wrote some of these and they're the ones you're laughing at'". Marlow Stern of Rolling Stone noted that many of Koy's jokes drew "groans" and "boos" from the audience.

Among jokes that drew the most ire were those about the film Barbie, and attending nominees Robert De Niro, Meryl Streep and Taylor Swift; the latter's reaction went viral. Shirley Li of The Atlantic wrote: "Practically every joke failed to land, mostly because the punchlines were dated or obvious." Nicole Sperling of The New York Times, who was in the audience that night, wrote that she had "never seen an audience rebel against an emcee so quickly" and cited a prominent film director describing the monologue as a "disaster".

Conversely, four-time Academy Awards host and comedian Whoopi Goldberg defended Koy on The View, saying: "These hosting gigs are brutal. They're just brutal. If you don't know the room, if you've not been in these rooms before and you're sort of thrust out there, it's hit or miss. Now, I love Jo Koy, he makes me crazy because he's funny. I don't know whether it was the room, I don't know whether it was the jokes, I didn't get to see it. But I do know, that he is as good as it gets when it comes to stand-ups and it is not an easy gig." Actor and comedian Steve Martin also threw his support behind Koy on Threads, writing: "I tip my hat to anyone who steps out on stage to host a live awards show. It's a very difficult job and not for the squeamish. I know because I'm still throwing up from the last time I did it in 2010. So, Congratulations to Jo Koy, who took on the toughest gig in show business, hit, missed, was light on his feet, and now has twenty minutes of new material for his stand up!"

Additionally, comedian Michael Che supported Koy by writing that "comedians should boycott hosting award shows" on Instagram. When questioned about Koy's jokes aimed toward her film Barbie, director Greta Gerwig replied that she was not offended. On Watch What Happens Live with Andy Cohen, actor and comedian Kevin Hart said he has "no reaction" to the backlash and went on to praise Koy for being a "phenomenal comedian". In a Facebook post by Filipino actor and comedian Michael V., he posted: "I think Jo Koy's Golden Globes jokes are funny, direct, and pretty much self-explanatory. The last thing Jo Koy should be doing is trying to explain it to people who purposely choose NOT to understand and appreciate them."

Koy responded to the criticism in an interview with Good Morning America, admitting: "I'd be lying if [I said] it doesn't hurt," but also admitted, "I had fun. You know, it was a moment that I'll always remember. Hosting is just a tough gig. Yes, I'm a stand-up comic, but that hosting position it's a different style. I kind of went in and did the writer's thing. We had ten days to write this monologue. It was a crash course. I feel bad, but I got to still say I loved what I did." In his first stand-up set afterward, Koy mocked the Hollywood celebrities, alluding: "Lot a marshmallows, man. They're delicious, but goddamn, they're soft. I just come from a different time. I see the changes that are happening. I get it, but goddamn, can we fucking laugh at ourselves?"

== See also ==
- 51st Annie Awards
- 96th Academy Awards
- 77th British Academy Film Awards
- 29th Critics' Choice Awards
- 44th Golden Raspberry Awards
- 39th Independent Spirit Awards
- 28th Satellite Awards
- 51st Saturn Awards
- 30th Screen Actors Guild Awards
