= Nyad (film) =

2023 sports drama film

- Official release poster
- Directed by: Elizabeth Chai Vasarhelyi; Jimmy Chin
- Screenplay by: Julia Cox
- Based on: Find a Way by Diana Nyad
- Produced by: Andrew Lazar; Teddy Schwarzman
- Starring: Annette Bening; Jodie Foster; Rhys Ifans
- Cinematography: Claudio Miranda
- Edited by: Christopher Tellefsen
- Music by: Alexandre Desplat
- Production companies: Black Bear Pictures; Mad Chance Productions
- Distributed by: Netflix
- Release dates: September 1, 2023 (Telluride); October 20, 2023 (United States)
- Running time: 120 minutes
- Country: United States
- Language: English

Nyad is a 2023 American biographical sports drama film about swimmer Diana Nyad's multiple attempts in the early 2010s to swim the Straits of Florida. It is directed by Elizabeth Chai Vasarhelyi and Jimmy Chin (in their feature narrative film directorial debut) and written by Julia Cox, based on Nyad's 2015 memoir Find a Way. It stars Annette Bening as Nyad, with Jodie Foster and Rhys Ifans.

Nyad premiered at the 50th Telluride Film Festival on September 1, 2023. Following its premiere at the 2023 Toronto International Film Festival, it was released in select theaters on October 20, 2023, then streamed on Netflix on November 3. Nyad received positive reviews from critics, with particular praise for the performances of Bening and Foster who both received nominations for Best Actress and Supporting Actress, respectively, at the 96th Academy Awards, 81st Golden Globe Awards, and the 30th Screen Actors Guild Awards.

== Plot ==
In 2010, sixty-year-old Diana Nyad resolves to accomplish the one thing that has eluded her—a 110-mile nonstop swim from Cuba to Florida, which she unsuccessfully attempted thirty years prior. She appoints her best friend and former partner, Bonnie Stoll, to train her. Despite public skepticism because of her age, Diana relocates to Key West with Bonnie for her training and hires navigator John Bartlett to accompany her on her swim. In lieu of a shark cage, Diana opts to swim with a Shark Shield, a shark repellant electronic device.

In August 2011, Diana makes her first attempt at swimming the Florida Straits since 1978. However, an allergic reaction to painkillers, combined with unfavorable ocean currents pushing her off course, forces her to quit early. On her second attempt a month later, she gets stung by box jellyfish. The lead medic jumps in to save her, but he is also ensnared by the jellyfish and has to be rescued. A shot is administered to Diana for the venom, but she insists on continuing to swim with her injury. After some initial resistance, Bonnie and John oblige her, but Diana gets stung again and briefly loses consciousness. She is resuscitated on the boat.

Diana recovers in a hospital, where Bonnie expresses her worry to Diana about the severity of the dangers and warns her she is letting her personal dream overtake the safety of the boat crew. Diana pleads for another try and consults with a box jellyfish expert, who gives her a specially designed protective suit. Diana's swims and training are interspersed with flashbacks that show her upbringing and her sexual abuse at the hands of her childhood swimming coach, Jack Nelson.

In August 2012, Diana makes another attempt, despite warnings from John about bad weather conditions. A thunderstorm breaks out during Diana's swim and John's boat starts to flood. Bonnie calls for Diana to abort the mission despite Diana's pleas to keep going. Back on land, Diana refuses to admit defeat and plans for another try, prompting a fight between her and Bonnie. Bonnie calls out Diana's self-centeredness and laments how she has put aside her own dreams just to support Diana, before quitting as trainer.

Some time later, Diana calls John and apologizes for her behavior. John accepts the apology but admits he can't do another run because of more pressing concerns, including financial stability. Diana visits Bonnie and the two reconcile. Bonnie informs Diana that Nelson died, and the news compels Diana to reflect on her trauma. Bonnie later decides to train Diana again after realizing the closeness of their bond. John also returns as navigator; he discloses to Bonnie that he is in ill health and wants one last opportunity to see what Diana can do.

Diana begins her fifth attempt on August 31, 2013; this time she is helped by more favorable currents. Danger arises when a shark approaches and the Shark Shield is not properly functioning. Assistants from the boat's crew jump in the water in time to ward off the shark, which swims away. Hours later, Diana's body is showing signs of exhaustion. She has hallucinatory visions of the Yellow Brick Road from The Wizard of Oz and the Taj Mahal. To help motivate her, Bonnie jumps into the water and implores Diana to give it one last push. When the coastline of Key West is in sight, the crew excitedly informs Diana that they are getting closer.

On September 2, Diana makes it to the shore of Key West, where hordes of spectators and fans are gathered to watch. She emerges from the water and gradually ascends onto the beach, prompting celebrations from the crowd. Asked by the press to speak, Diana says she wants to say three things: "One, never, ever give up. Two, you're never too old to chase your dreams. And three, it may look like a solitary sport…but it takes a team."

== Cast ==
- Annette Bening as Diana Nyad
  - Anna Harriette Pittman as Diana, age 14
- Jodie Foster as Bonnie Stoll
- Rhys Ifans as John Bartlett
- Karly Rothenberg as Dee Brady
- Jeena Yi as Angel Yanagihara
- Luke Cosgrove as Luke Tipple
- Eric T. Miller as Jack Nelson
- Garland Scott as Jon Rose

== Production ==
=== Development ===
In January 2022, it was announced that Netflix would distribute the film. In March 2022, it was announced that production was underway. Filming mostly took place in the Dominican Republic, including in a water tank at Pinewood Studios.

== Release ==
Nyad had its world premiere at the 50th Telluride Film Festival on September 1, 2023. It had its international premiere on September 12, at the 48th Toronto International Film Festival. It was released in select theaters on October 20, 2023, then streamed on Netflix on November 3.

== Reception ==
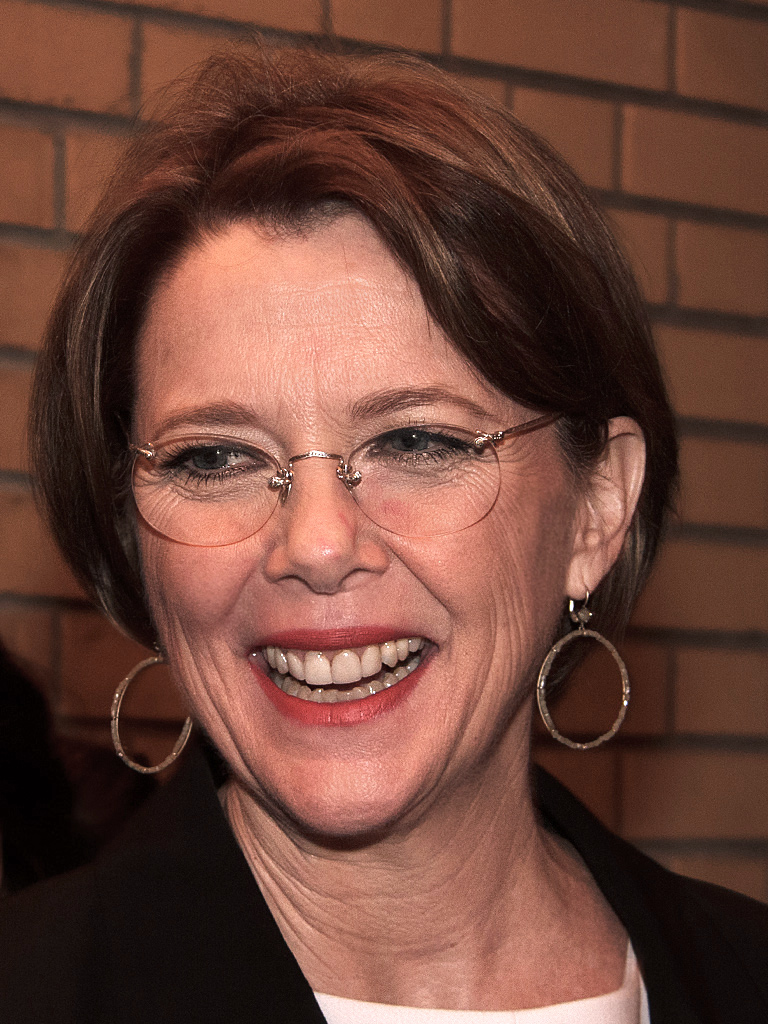
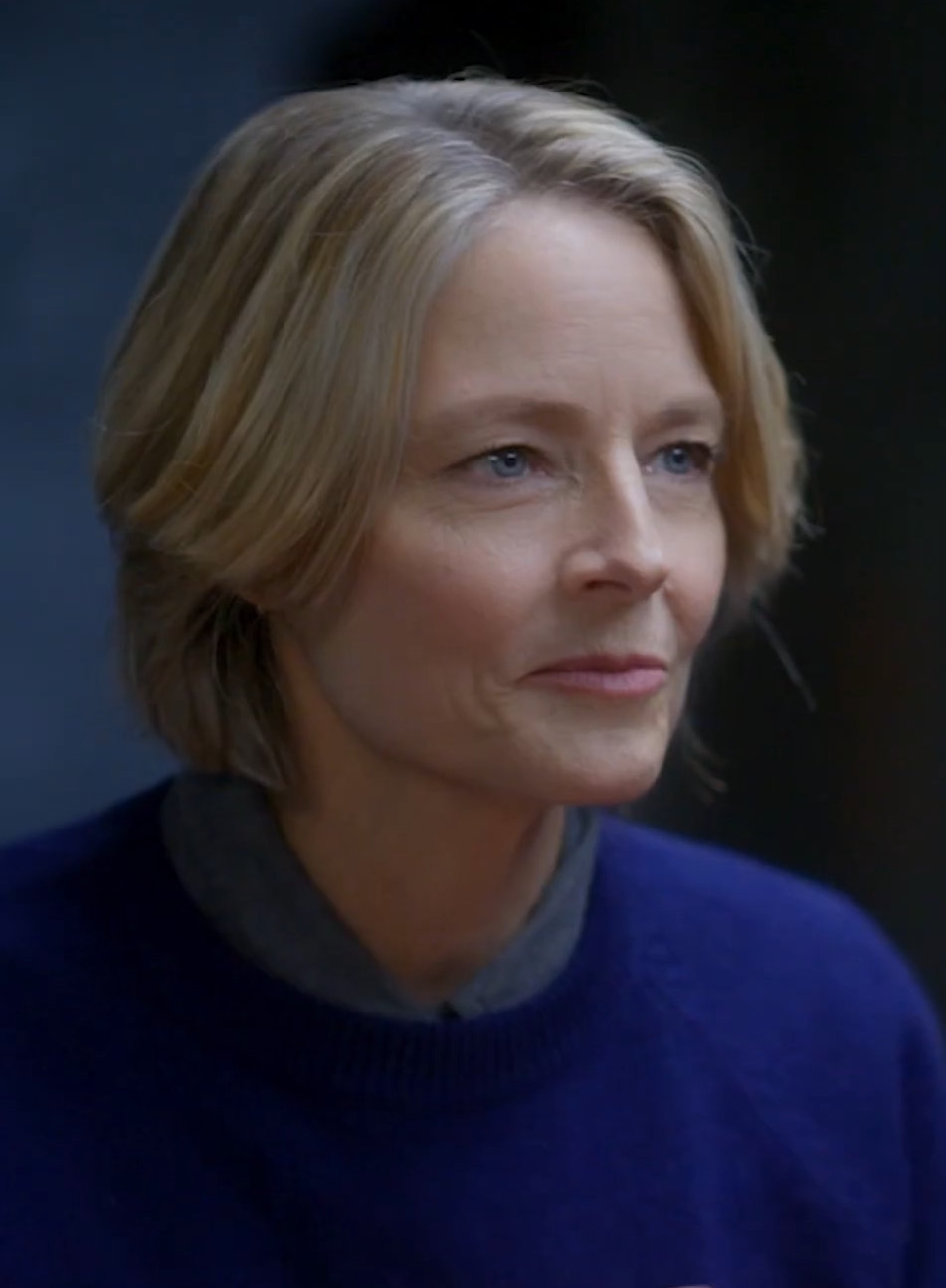
Annette Bening and Jodie Foster garnered critical acclaim for their performances and earned Academy Award nominations for Best Actress and Best Supporting Actress.

On the review aggregator website Rotten Tomatoes, 85% of 162 critics' reviews are positive, with an average rating of 7/10. The website's consensus reads: "Nyad is an uplifting sports biopic strictly on the merits of its story, but it's the outstanding performances from Annette Bening and Jodie Foster that really keep this picture afloat." Metacritic, which uses a weighted average, assigned the film a score of 63 out of 100, based on 36 critics, indicating "generally favorable" reviews.

Richard Roeper called the film a "rousing biopic" and stated: "When Bening and Foster are onscreen together, it’s movie magic. They don’t just have chemistry; they’re chemistry professors." Siddhant Adlakha of Mashable wrote, "It's a movie in which age is both obstacle and strength, and it allows Bening and Foster to play their ages gracefully, as actresses in their sixties. Whatever it struggles to say about bravery in the face of wounds from decades past, it manages to say tenfold about the way its characters choose to live now. Nyad builds to exuberant emotional crescendos that feel straight out of the schmaltzy Hollywood biopic playbook, but these scenes transcend cliché thanks to the emotionally resonant performances at their core." He critiqued the handling of the abuse plot line as "narratively misplaced", but said "thanks to [the film's] unyielding focus on physical strain and suffering — it's the aquatic Passion of the Christ — it maintains enough stakes and sporadic intensity to get by". Writing for The New York Times, Amy Nicholson said Bening and Foster's scenes together "capture decades of camaraderie in effortless shorthand".

Writing for Vulture, Alison Willmore praised how the film eschews biopic conventions of making the protagonist likable, as well as Bening's commitment to the role and physical transformation. She said, "Despite that dedication, there’s a hollowness to the way the film characterizes its protagonist, which means Bening’s performance never fully resonates", adding "we never see any of that or much of what [Diana's] life is like outside of training at all". Christy Lemire of RogerEbert.com wrote, "There's a thornier, messier, much more provocative story to be told here, so it's frustrating the filmmakers opt for easy inspiration instead." She noted how the film curiously skips over Nyad's history of embellishment, but praised the acting in particular, saying "it’s a joy to watch Foster dig into this kind of amusing and meaty role once more. Bonnie is the one person who will call Diana out on her obnoxious behavior—at least until Rhys Ifans arrives later as the no-nonsense captain of the boat that cruises alongside Diana during troubled try after try." Lemire concluded Nyad "might not be the greatest film about…achievement, but it’s sufficiently entertaining".

Rex Reed called it "a movie of uncommon exhilaration" that "resonates long after the final frame," and highly praised the performances of Bening and Foster. Peter Travers said Bening's performance is "body-and-soul acting at its peak", and referred to Foster as "an exuberant blast", continuing: "Their teamwork is a thing of beauty." Leonard Maltin named Nyad as one of his favorite films of 2023: "Nyad is a compelling biopic that could have been bland, or didactic, or dull. Instead, in the hands of documentary filmmakers Jimmy Chin and Elizabeth Chai Vasarhelyi, with a smart script by Julia Cox, it soars. One of this year's great pleasures was watching Annette Bening and Jodie Foster together, inhabiting their characters so completely that it didn't seem like acting at all. I would also nominate Rhys Ifans for Best Supporting Actor."

=== Accolades ===
Award / Film Festival	Date of ceremony	Category	Recipient(s)	Result	Ref
The Queerties	February 28, 2023	Next Big Thing	NYAD	Nominated	
Mill Valley Film Festival	October 16, 2023	Variety Screenwriters to Watch	Julia Cox	Won	
Hollywood Music in Media Awards	November 15, 2023	Original Score — Feature Film	Alexandre Desplat	Nominated	
Washington D.C. Area Film Critics Association Awards	December 10, 2023	Best Supporting Actress	Jodie Foster	Nominated	
Chicago Film Critics Association	December 12, 2023	Best Supporting Actress	Jodie Foster	Nominated	
Dallas–Fort Worth Film Critics Association	December 12, 2023	Best Supporting Actress	Jodie Foster	Runner-up	
Women Film Critics Circle	December 18, 2023	Best Actress	Annette Bening	Runner-up	
Women Film Critics Circle	December 18, 2023	Best Supporting Actress	Jodie Foster	Nominated	
Women Film Critics Circle	December 18, 2023	Best Equality of the Sexes	NYAD	Nominated	
Women Film Critics Circle	December 18, 2023	Best Screen Couple	Annette Bening & Jodie Foster	Won	
San Diego Film Critics Society	December 19, 2023	Best Supporting Actress	Jodie Foster	Nominated	
Dublin Film Critics Circle Awards	December 19, 2023	Best Actress	Annette Bening	8th place	
Alliance of Women Film Journalists	January 3, 2024	Grand Dame for Defying Ageism	Jodie Foster	Nominated	
Alliance of Women Film Journalists	January 3, 2024	Grand Dame for Defying Ageism	Annette Bening	Won	
Alliance of Women Film Journalists	January 3, 2024	Most Daring Performance	Annette Bening	Nominated	
Golden Globe Awards	January 7, 2024	Best Actress in a Motion Picture – Drama	Annette Bening	Nominated	
Golden Globe Awards	January 7, 2024	Best Supporting Actress	Jodie Foster	Nominated	
San Francisco Bay Area Film Critics Circle	January 9, 2024	Best Supporting Actress	Jodie Foster	Nominated	
Columbus Film Critics Association	January 9, 2024	Best Supporting Performance	Jodie Foster	Won	
San Francisco Bay Area Film Critics Circle	January 9, 2024	Best Supporting Actress	Jodie Foster	Nominated	
Critics' Choice Awards	January 14, 2024	Best Supporting Actress	Jodie Foster	Nominated	
AARP Movies for Grownups Awards	January 17, 2024	Best Supporting Actress	Jodie Foster	Won	
AARP Movies for Grownups Awards	January 17, 2024	Best Actress	Annette Bening	Won	
Make-Up Artists and Hair Stylists Guild	February 18, 2024	Best Contemporary Make-Up in a Feature-Length Motion Picture	Felicity Bowring, Ann Maree Hurley, Julie Hewett, Mahar Lessner	Nominated	
Make-Up Artists and Hair Stylists Guild	February 18, 2024	Best Contemporary Hair Styling in a Feature-Length Motion Picture	Daniel Curet, Vanessa Columbo, Enzo Angileri, Darlene Brumfeld	Nominated	
Costume Designers Guild Awards	February 21, 2024	Excellence in Contemporary Film	Kelli Jones	Nominated	
Visual Effects Society Awards	February 21, 2024	Outstanding Supporting Visual Effects in a Photoreal Feature	Jake Braver, Fiona Campbell, Westgate R., Christopher White, Mohsen Mousavi, Dann Tarmy	Won	
Visual Effects Society Awards	February 21, 2024	Outstanding Effects Simulations in a Photoreal Feature	Korbinian Meier, Sindy Saalfeld, David Michielsen, Andreas Vrhovsek (for stormy waters)	Nominated	
Screen Actors Guild Awards	February 24, 2024	Outstanding Performance by a Female Actor in a Leading Role	Annette Bening	Nominated	
Screen Actors Guild Awards	February 24, 2024	Outstanding Performance by a Female Actor in a Supporting Role	Jodie Foster	Nominated	
Academy Awards	March 10, 2024	Best Actress	Annette Bening	Nominated	
Academy Awards	March 10, 2024	Best Supporting Actress	Jodie Foster	Nominated	
Writers Guild of America Awards	April 14, 2024	Best Adapted Screenplay	Julia Cox	Nominated	
GLAAD Media Awards	May 11, 2024	Outstanding Film – Streaming or TV	NYAD	Nominated	
Cinema for Peace awards	February 19, 2025	Dove for Women’s Empowerment	NYAD	Nominated	

== Historical accuracy ==
=== Ratification and record controversies ===
Nyad's crossing from Cuba to Florida took four attempts over four years and has never been formally ratified due to the lack of independent observers and incomplete records. The Guinness Book of World Records revoked Nyad's achievement. Nyad responded by saying "Maybe I had too much hubris, like, ‘I don’t need to prove this to anybody.’ That's my bad".

However, the Los Angeles Times reported that on previous occasions Nyad had lied about her swimming record, stating that she placed sixth at the 1968 Olympic trials, which she never actually attended, and claiming in her 2015 memoir Find a Way, which served as the basis of the film, that she was the first person to swim around Manhattan, when she was in fact the seventh.

Some Nyad supporters dismissed scrutiny of Nyad as a sexist response to a powerful woman, but her detractors have countered that marathon swimming is one of the few sports where women frequently best men in competition. Athletes like Gertrude Ederle, Greta Andersen, Shelley-Taylor Smith and Cynthia Nicholas have been celebrated by the swimming community for outperforming men in endurance and speed.

Marathon swimmer and journalist Elaine K. Howley stated, “Nyad lovers always throw back at us that we’re anti-female, anti-gay, and that couldn’t be further from the truth. I have found marathon swimming to be incredibly LGBTQ+-friendly and welcoming to older women. That is all a straw man. Just because somebody is part of a marginalized group doesn’t mean you can’t ask questions when they make extraordinary claims.”

In September 2023, the World Open Water Swimming Association renewed an investigation into Nyad's 2013 Cuba to Florida swim and again declined to certify the swim. The swim was reported to have been completed in accordance with the rules and procedures set forth by the Florida Straits Open Water Swimming Association that did not exist at the time of the swim, but were based on English Channel Association standards. Additionally, the observer logs for the swim were incomplete, with over nine hours of the critical overnight period undocumented, and there were conflicting accounts from crew members regarding events that transpired during these hours.

=== Discrepancies in film portrayal ===
The film simplifies Nyad's Cuba-to-Florida swim, showing her with only one vessel and aiming for an "unassisted" swim, which misrepresents the actual event's involvement of multiple vessels, a comprehensive crew, and the use of a stinger suit that contradicts the unassisted claim. The film dramatizes events that did not occur, such as a shark encounter, which never happened during the 2013 attempt but has affected documented marathon swims by other athletes. It also inaccurately portrays her completing a swim of the English Channel, which official records show she never did, and gives her the extraordinary English Channel crossing time of 7.5 hours, which would make her time 10 minutes faster than the current record-holder for fastest swim by a woman (or lady, per Channel Swimming Association parlance), the American Penny Lee Dean.
