= The Groomsmen: Second Chances =

- Directed by: Ron Oliver
- Written by: Rick Garman
- Produced by: Kristina Kambitova
- Starring: Jonathan Bennett; Alexander Lincoln; Tyler Hynes; B. J. Britt
- Cinematography: Alexander Krumov
- Edited by: Cindy Au Yeung
- Music by: Amanda Cawley
- Production company: Front Street Pictures
- Distributed by: Hallmark Media
- Release date: October 24, 2024 (USA)
- Running time: 84 minutes
- Country: United States
- Language: English

The Groomsmen: Second Chances is a 2024 American romantic comedy film directed by Ron Oliver. It stars Jonathan Bennett and Alexander Lincoln. The film portrays a baseball coach who becomes aware of his romantic feelings for his best friend after the latter becomes engaged.

It is the second installment in The Groomsmen trilogy, which follows the lives and romantic relationships of the three best friends who are "of different backgrounds, cultures, and sexual orientations" as they each find love in Greece, Italy and Bulgaria. It was released on Hallmark+ on October 24, 2024.

The film won the GLAAD Media Award for Outstanding Film – Streaming or TV.

== Plot ==
Elizabeth, still in her wedding dress, runs from her own wedding and asks Kate, a tavern owner, to help her ward off three pursuing groomsmen. Kate agrees to hide Elizabeth, but only if Elizabeth explains why she ran. After telling the first love story, Elizabeth begins to tell the next love story.

Danny, a former pro baseball player turned coach, is easygoing and relies heavily on his business manager, Zack, for everything outside of baseball. Despite their contrasting personalities—Danny is optimistic, Zack is meticulous—they're close friends who openly share details about their romantic lives. Danny's old friends, Jackson and Pete, often suggest Danny and Zack should date, but Danny always dismisses the idea, convinced they're just friends.

Danny's perspective changes when he learns Zack broke up with his boyfriend, Nolan, because Nolan rejected Zack's marriage proposal. Danny suddenly realizes he has romantic feelings for Zack. Encouraged by Jackson and Pete, Danny plans to confess, but then he is told that Zack and Nolan have reconciled and are getting married. Heartbroken but supportive, Danny agrees to be Zack's best man and helps plan the wedding since Nolan is too busy. At Zack's request, the wedding is to be held at a winery in Greece that Zack and Danny once visited on business.

Initially, Danny maintains a professional distance while planning, but the more time he spends alone with Zack, the stronger his feelings become. Jackson and Pete, seeing Zack's genuine love for Nolan, warn Danny not to risk their friendship by confessing his true feelings.

Two weeks before the wedding, Nolan's new work commitment means he can only arrive in Greece the day before the ceremony, leaving Zack to travel alone. Danny watches Zack leave with mixed emotions. Once in Greece, Zack discovers the winery handling all their local arrangements has gone out of business, leaving the wedding plans in complete chaos. Panicked, Zack calls Danny, who immediately rushes to Greece, even though he has some games.

With help from Ophelia, a local YouTuber and culinary expert introduced by Jackson, and her ex-husband, Constantinos, a florist, they manage to find a new venue and schedule the wedding for the original date. This crisis brings Danny and Zack even closer. Two nights before the wedding, they almost share a spontaneous kiss, but Nolan's early arrival interrupts them. Danny now knows Zack feels the same way.

The next day, Danny tries to discuss the almost-kiss, but Zack refuses, unwilling to call off his wedding to Nolan. Desperate not to lose his best friend, Danny tries to suppress his feelings. However, that evening, urged on by Jackson and Pete, Danny honestly expresses his emotions to Zack. Though Zack looks conflicted, he firmly rejects Danny.

On the wedding day, Zack realizes the unbridgeable distance between him and Nolan. Meanwhile, Jackson and Pete find Danny looking out at the sea from a cliff. Then Zack appears, finally confessing his feelings to Danny. They declare their love, share a kiss, and hand-in-hand, leap off the cliff—a jump Zack had been reluctant to make.

One year later, Danny and Zack are getting married at the same Greek location. It's revealed that on the original wedding day, Zack told Nolan he couldn't marry him. Nolan, though upset, understood, and they parted amicably. Nolan has since married someone else and now has four children.

Surrounded by family and friends, Danny and Zack exchange vows, tearfully expressing their love, and are officially wed.

Elizabeth tells Kate that this story taught her, "Sometimes, love is right there in front of you. All you have to do is open your eyes and see it." Kate is moved by the happy ending but points out it doesn't fully explain Elizabeth's own actions. Elizabeth, while asserting her love for her fiancé, replies that to truly explain herself, she needs to share another love story.

== Cast ==
- Jonathan Bennett as Danny: A baseball coach.
- Alexander Lincoln as Zack: Danny's business manager and best friend.
- Tyler Hynes as Jackson: Danny's best friend and a social media agent.
- B. J. Britt as Pete: Danny's best friend and a pediatrician.
- Lily Dodsworth-Evans as Elizabeth: A young woman who runs away as a bride.
- Annie Bird as Kate: The tavern owner who hid Elizabeth.
- Sue Kelvin as Ophelia: A Greek YouTuber and a culinary expert.
- Andreas Karras as Constantinos: Ophelia's ex-husband and a florist.
- Chloe Raphael as Betty: Jackson's daughter.
- Adam Rhys-Charles as Nolan: Zack's fiancé and a prosecutor.
- Oliver Shaw as Milo: Betty's friend.
- Elizabeth Wautlet as Hannah: Danny's sister who married to Wyatt.
- Heather Hemmens as Chelsea: Pete's wife and a doctor.

== Production ==
Jonathan Bennett, who served as executive producer as well as playing the lead role, said that his “real life group of friends” inspired the plot of the trilogy. Like his character Danny, Bennett identifies as a gay man and also has two straight best friends. While gay characters are often set in some stereotype, such as fashion designers, Bennett said "to tell this story of Danny, who is a former major league baseball pitcher who becomes a coach is another thing that is breaking the heteronormative storyline that you would [see] in a lot of movies."

== Reception ==
=== Critical response ===
Liz Kokan at Decider highly praised this film as stating that "While there’s never a doubt how the second film in the Groomsmen series will end, the film earns its happy ending and feels more earnest and emotional than most romances."

=== Accolades ===
Award/Festival	Date of ceremony	Category	Recipient(s)	Result	Ref.
GLAAD Media Award	March 27, 2025	Outstanding Film – Streaming or TV		Won	
