= Walter Poenisch =

American distance swimmer (1913–2000)

- Born: Walter Poenisch; German Village, Ohio, U.S.
- Died: June 6, 2000 (aged 86); Grove City, Ohio
- Occupations: Swimmer, baker
- Known for: Endurance swimming
- Website: www.swim4peace.com

Walter Poenisch (July 11, 1913 – June 6, 2000) was an American baker and long-distance swimmer.

== Biography ==
In 1963, at the age of 50, Poenisch began his professional swimming career by swimming in the Jim Moran Lake Michigan Swim, a 30-mile professional marathon swim in Lake Michigan.

In June 1972, Poenisch tried to establish a long-distance ocean swimming record off of Florida but was pulled from the water after sharks attacked his safety cage. In 1976, he swam 125 miles in the Florida Straits and was listed in the Guinness Book of World Records for the longest ocean swim.

To memorialize his 65th birthday in 1978, Poenisch set out to be the first to swim from Havana, Cuba to the Florida Keys. As then-President of Cuba Fidel Castro watched, Poenisch began his swim from Cuba on July 13, 1978. About thirty-three hours later, Poenisch arrived at Little Duck Key, a small island in the lower Florida Keys. As a result of not filing for official recognition – he had no outside observer beside his own personal crew – his swim did not receive official recognition. He subsequently sued three parties, including the International Swimming Hall of Fame and Diana Nyad, a long-distance swimmer competitor who began her first Cuba-to-Florida swim on July 16, 1978 – two days after Poenisch arrived in Florida. Poenisch claimed that Nyad's publicist and Nyad had slandered him just before she left on her swim by how they characterized his Cuba-to-Florida swim efforts. Poenisch received $5,000 from each of the three parties in an out-of-court settlement five years later in April 1983.

Poenisch died in June 2000, and as of September 2013 had not received official recognition for his 1978 Cuba-to-Florida swim.

In August 2017, Poenisch was inducted into the International Swimming Hall of Fame as a "Pioneer Open Water Swimmer."
