= Three Wise Men and a Baby =

2022 Canadian TV film directed by Terry Ingram

- Written by: Paul Campbell; Kimberley Sustad
- Directed by: Terry Ingram
- Starring: Paul Campbell; Tyler Hynes; Andrew Walker; Margaret Colin
- Music by: Jordan Klassen; Taylor Swindells
- Country of origin: United States
- Original language: English

Production
- Executive producers: Jamie Goehring; Trevor McWhinney; Jonathan Shore; Shawn Williamson
- Editor: Asim Nuraney
- Running time: 84 minutes
- Production company: Lighthouse Pictures

Original release
- Network: Hallmark Channel
- Release: November 19, 2022

Three Wise Men and a Baby is a 2022 Canadian Christmas comedy drama television film directed by Terry Ingram and written by Paul Campbell and Kimberley Sustad. It stars Campbell, Tyler Hynes, Andrew W. Walker and Margaret Colin. The film follows three brothers who are surprised when they find themselves forced to care for a baby during the holidays. It is not related to 1987 comedy film Three Men and a Baby (also starring Margaret Colin), but is loosely based on the same premise.

The film premiered on Hallmark Channel on November 19, 2022, as part of Countdown to Christmas. Three Wise Men and a Baby received positive reviews from television critics and become the most-watched cable TV movie of the year. A sequel, Three Wiser Men and a Boy premiered in November 23, 2024. A third movie, Three Wisest Men, premiered on November 15, 2025.

== Plot ==
At the request of their mother Barbara, the three brothers Luke, Taylor, and Stephan spend the days around Christmas at her house. However, the three brothers have grown apart since their father left the family when they were still children. Stephan is now an animal therapist, but he has a pronounced social phobia and a cleanliness obsession. He rejects Susie, who is interested in a relationship with him, under the pretext that they are too different. Taylor lives a chaotic life, lives in the basement of his mother's house, and retreats as soon as things get serious. For this reason, he quits his job shortly before Christmas because he feels like he doesn't fit into the team. Luke often takes a back seat and is primarily there for those around him, even neglecting the construction of his own house. However, the three have one thing in common: they are all unsuccessful in love.

One afternoon, Luke, who works as a firefighter, finds a baby at the door of the fire station with a note saying that the baby's name is Thomas and that Luke should take good care of him until Christmas. Driven by his desire to help, Luke takes the baby in, or rather to his mother's house, where his brothers also help look after the baby. Barbara receives a call from their aunt, who has had an accident and suffered a concussion. She spontaneously decides to drive to her house, leaving her sons alone with the baby. However, a snowstorm prevents Barbara from returning home, forcing the brothers to take care of the baby on their own in the days leading up to Christmas, as well as decorate the house.

At first, Taylor takes care of the baby alone, as his two brothers have to work. However, he is clumsy when shopping and buys adult diapers instead of baby diapers. From this point on, Stephan takes over the role of babysitter. While he is baking cookies with the baby, it starts to cry. Stephan is so focused on calming the baby down that he doesn't notice the cookies burning in the oven until Taylor points it out to him. Now Taylor and Stephan take care of the baby together, and over time, the relationship between the two brothers improves.

Finally, Luke comes home from work and sees that his brothers are completely overwhelmed with babysitting. The next morning, Luke has already baked cookies with the baby, which, contrary to expectations, look delicious. He sets off for work, taking the baby with him. However, when he returns in the evening, Stephan notices that there is a different baby in the bassinet. He finally manages to return the baby to its parents and swap it for Thomas.

Over the next few days, the brothers take the baby on a trip to a Christmas market, where they go ice skating and make the baby laugh. When they return to their mother's house, their arrogant neighbor Mark LaClark shows off his Christmas decorations. He tells them that he will win this year's television station prize again with his decorations, which are reminiscent of Christmas in Las Vegas. The brothers now feel challenged to beat Mark in the upcoming competition and immediately set about decorating the entire house, including the front yard. They get help from Susie and Fiona.

When the TV station wants to announce Mark as the winner of the competition in the evening, a Christmas fire truck drives up and stops in front of the brothers' house. However, the presentation of their Christmas decorations fails because the power generator is overloaded with the lavish lighting, so the brothers improvise their nativity play, which is illuminated only by a spotlight and the star on the truck. Fiona finally manages to reset the fuses. In the end, Mark is still named the winner. However, he is impressed by the performance of his competitors and invites them for a glass of eggnog. Barbara also returns from visiting their aunt, and an unknown young woman runs out of the crowd toward the brothers, who turns out to be Sophie, the mother of baby Thomas.

They celebrate Christmas together the next day. Sophie confesses that, as a single mother, she was completely overwhelmed with the child during the Christmas season. When she was in the hospital for Thomas' birth, Luke was the first to check on her. She felt his care and decided to temporarily entrust the baby to him.

As Luke and Sophie grow closer, Stephan also plucks up the courage to approach Susie, who has been in love with him since they first met. When he confesses his feelings to her, they kiss. Taylor also visits his former workplace and apologizes for his sudden departure. Fiona tells him that she spoke to her boss on his behalf to give Taylor another chance. He admits his mistakes and tells Fiona that he doesn't want to lose her again.

A year later, the brothers celebrate Christmas with their girlfriends Susie, Sophie, and Fiona at Luke's house. Barbara, Thomas, and Hernandez, who has become friends with the brothers since the competition, are also invited.

== Cast ==
- Paul Campbell as Stephan Brenner, Barbara's second son (the paternal uncle of Thomas)
- Tyler Hynes as Taylor Brenner, Barbara's third son (the paternal uncle of Thomas)
- Andrew Walker as Luke Brenner, Barbara's first son (the father of Thomas)
- Margaret Colin as Barbara Brenner, Luke, Stephan & Taylor's widowed mother (the paternal grandmother of Thomas)
- Ali Liebert as Fiona, Taylor's girlfriend
- Fiona Vroom as Susie, Stephan's love interest
- Matt Hamilton as Mark LaClark
- Jill Teed as Louise
- Geoff Gustafson as David
- Nicole Major as Sophie, Luke's girlfriend (the mother of Thomas)
- Paul Almeida as Hernandez

== Sequels ==
=== Three Wiser Man and a Boy ===
A second "Three Wise Men" Hallmark film, Three Wiser Man and a Boy was released on November 23, 2024.

- Paul Campbell as Stephan Brenner, Barbara's second son (the paternal uncle of Thomas)
- Tyler Hynes as Taylor Brenner, Barbara's third son (the paternal uncle of Thomas)
- Andrew Walker as Luke Brenner, Barbara's first son (the father of Thomas)
- Margaret Colin as Barbara Brenner, Luke, Stephan & Taylor's widowed mother (the paternal grandmother of Thomas)
- Miles Marthaller as Thomas Brenner, Luke & Sophie's son
- Christopher Shyer as Roy, Barbara's boyfriend later new second husband
- Erin Karpluk as Caroline, Taylor's love interest
- Fiona Vroom as Susie, Stephan's girlfriend
- Matt Hamilton as Mark LaClark
- Nicole Major as Sophie, Luke's girlfriend (the mother of Thomas)

=== Three Wisest Men ===
A third "Three Wise Men" Hallmark film. Three Wisest Men was released on November 15, 2025.

- Paul Campbell as Stephan Brenner, Barbara's second son (the paternal uncle of Thomas, Michaela & Cordelia)
- Tyler Hynes as Taylor Brenner, Barbara's third son (the paternal uncle of Thomas, Michaela & Cordelia)
- Andrew Walker as Luke Brenner, Barbara's first son (the father of Thomas, Michaela & Cordelia)
- Margaret Colin as Barbara Brenner, Luke, Stephen & Taylor's widowed mother (the paternal grandmother of Thomas, Michaela & Cordelia)
- Miles Marthaller as Thomas Brenner, Luke & Sophie's son and Michaela & Cordelia's older brother
- Christopher Shyer as Roy, Barbara's second husband
- Erin Karpluk as Caroline, Taylor's girlfriend
- Matt Hamilton as Mark LaClark
- Lochlyn Munro as Bob, Susie's father and Stephan's father-in-law
- Ali Liebert as Fiona, Taylor's former girlfriend
- Fiona Vroom as Susie Brenner, Stephan's wife (the paternal aunt of Thomas, Michaela & Cordelia)
- Nicole Major as Sophie Brenner, Luke's wife (the mother of Thomas, Michaela & Cordelia)

== Reception ==
The film received positive reviews from television critics. Brett White from the Decider gave it a positive review praising the performances, particularly Matt Hamilton. It ranked #3 on Variety's "The 25 Best Hallmark Christmas Movies" list.

Three Wise Men and a Baby became the most-watched movie on cable in 2022 with 3.6 million total viewers.
