= Tyler Hynes =

Canadian actor (born 1986)

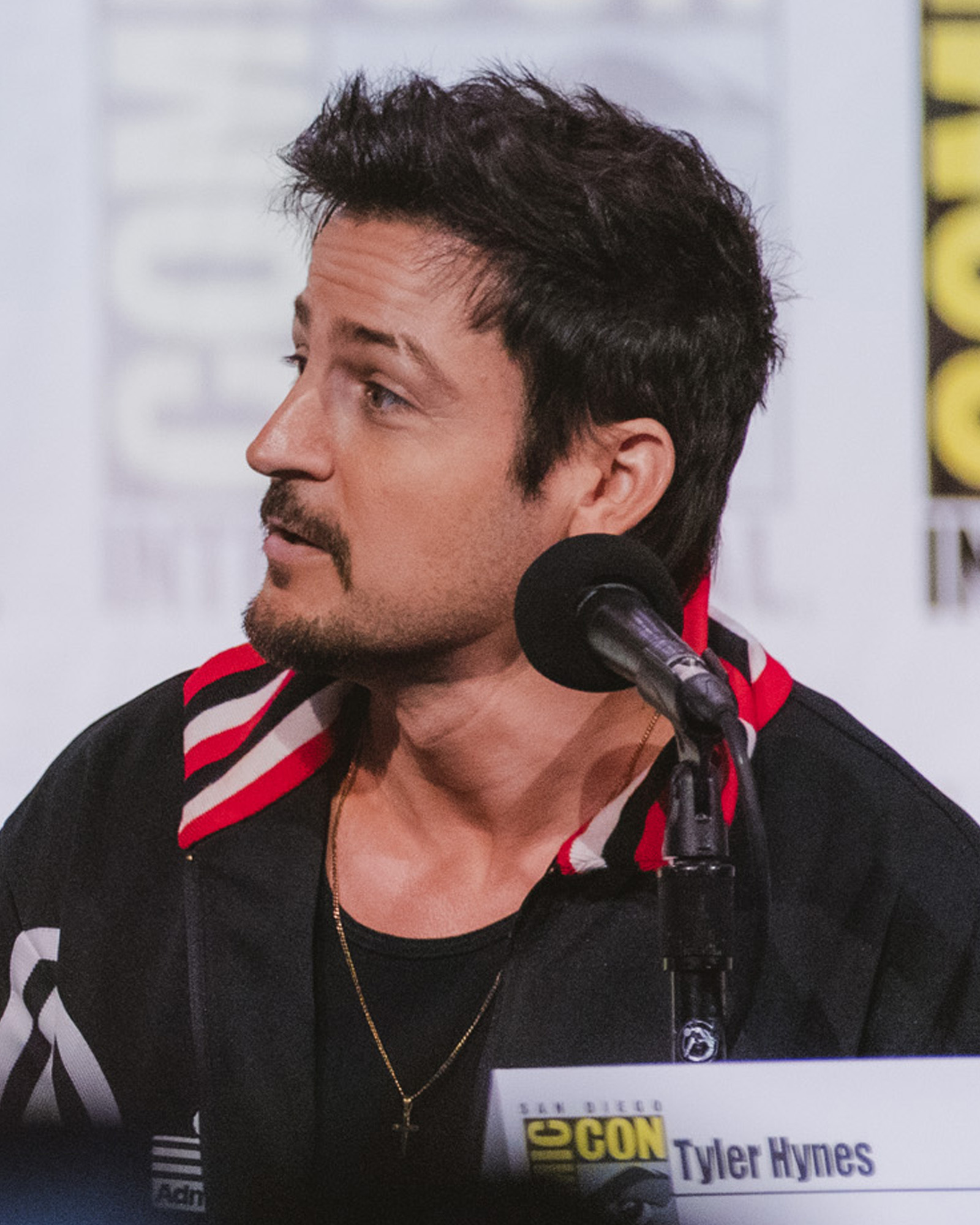
- Hynes in 2025
- Born: 6 May 1986 (age 40); Toronto, Ontario, Canada
- Occupation: Actor
- Years active: 1994–present

Tyler Hynes (born 6 May 1986) is a Canadian actor.

== Early life ==
Hynes was born in Toronto, Ontario, and grew up on a 24 hectare ranch outside Ottawa. He began acting professionally at the age of eight.

== Career ==
Hynes got his professional start at the age of eight during a 72-performance run of the musical stage production of A Christmas Carol as Tiny Tim, followed by a Canadian tour of The Who's rock opera Tommy, playing the role of 10-year-old Tommy. He followed this up with his first feature film, Little Men, starring Mariel Hemingway.

He portrayed Atreyu in 13 episodes of the TV series Tales from the Neverending Story and The Chosen One in the 24-episode run of Peter Benchley's Amazon. Tyler was nominated "Fan Favourite" at Canada's Gemini Awards at age 15. He later starred in Tagged: The Jonathan Wamback Story.

Hynes stars in 2024's The Groomsmen trilogy — First Look, Second Chances, and Last Dance on the Hallmark Channel.

Romance scams have used Hynes’s likeness on multiple occasions in attempts to convince people they are speaking to him directly. Hynes has posted warnings on his social media accounts indicating he does not contact strangers online and hoping to prevent further scams.

== Partial filmography ==
- Lassie (1997) – Darren
- Little Men (1998) – Demi Brooke
- Peter Benchley's Amazon (1999) – Will Bauer
- Saving Hope (2013–2014) – Luke Reid
- Letterkenny (2019–2021) – Dierks
- Roadhouse Romance (2021) – Luke Ellis
- An Unexpected Christmas (2021) – Jamie
- Always Amore (2022) – Ben Elliott
- Three Wise Men and a Baby (2022) – Taylor
- Three Wiser Men and a Boy (2024) – Taylor
- Holiday Touchdown: A Chiefs Love Story (2024) – Derrick Taylor
- The Groomsmen trilogy (2024) – Jackson
  - The Groomsmen: First Look
  - The Groomsmen: Second Chances
  - The Groomsmen: Last Dance
- The Nights Before Christmas (2026) -Marty
