= GLAAD Media Award for Outstanding Film – Streaming or TV =

LGBTQ-themed media award

The GLAAD Media Award for Outstanding Film – Streaming or TV is an annual award that honors television films that received a release by streaming or broadcast television outlets. Rooted in the Outstanding TV Movies category, the award was repeatedly merged with the award for Outstanding Mini-Series until the 31st GLAAD Media Awards in 2020, when it was separated into two distinct categories: one for television films, the other for limited or anthology series. Further changes took place in 2023 during the 34th GLAAD Media Awards, where television films became part of the Outstanding Film – Streaming or TV category. Starting with the 2023 ceremony, both categories for Outstanding Limited or Anthology Series and Outstanding Film – Limited Release exclude streaming films.

For a limited or anthology series to be eligible, it must include at least one LGBT character in a leading, supporting, or recurring capacity. The award may be accepted by any of the series' producers, writers, or actors. Limited and anthology series selected by GLAAD are evaluated based on four criteria: "Fair, Accurate, and Inclusive Representations" of the LGBT community, "Boldness and Originality" of the project, significant "Impact" on mainstream culture, and "Overall Quality" of the project. GLAAD monitors mainstream media to identify which series will be nominated, while also issuing a Call for Entries that encourages media outlets to submit programmes for consideration. By contrast, in order for series created by and for LGBT audiences to be considered for nomination, they must be submitted after the Call for Entries. Winners are determined by a plurality vote by GLAAD staff and its board, Shareholders Circle members, (Note: The Shareholders Circle consists of individuals who have made a donation of $1,500 or more.) volunteers and affiliated individuals.

== List ==
Award year	Publication	Production company	Ref(s).
2023 (34th)	Anything's Possible‡	Prime Video	
2023 (34th)	Fire Island‡	Hulu	
2023 (34th)	B-Boy Blues	BET+	
2023 (34th)	A Christmas to Treasure	Lifetime	
2023 (34th)	Crush	Hulu	
2023 (34th)	Do Revenge	Netflix	
2023 (34th)	The Fallout	HBO Max	
2023 (34th)	The Holiday Sitter	Hallmark	
2023 (34th)	Three Months	Paramount+	
2023 (34th)	Wildhood	Hulu	
2024 (35th)	Rustin	Netflix	
2024 (35th)	Cassandro	Prime Video	
2024 (35th)	Christmas on Cherry Lane	Hallmark	
2024 (35th)	Friends & Family Christmas	Hallmark	
2024 (35th)	Frybread Face and Me	Array Releasing	
2024 (35th)	Nuovo Olimpo	Netflix	
2024 (35th)	Nyad	Netflix	
2024 (35th)	Red, White & Royal Blue	Prime Video	
2024 (35th)	Runs in the Family	Indigenous Film Distribution	
2024 (35th)	You’re Not Supposed to Be Here	Lifetime	
2025 (36th)	The Groomsmen: Second Chances	Hallmark	
2025 (36th)	Am I Ok?	Max	
2025 (36th)	Fancy Dance	Apple TV+	
2025 (36th)	Good Grief	Netflix	
2025 (36th)	The Holiday Exchange	Prime Video/Peacock	
2025 (36th)	Mother of the Bride	Netflix	
2025 (36th)	Ricky Stanicky	Prime Video	
2025 (36th)	Season's Greetings from Cherry Lane	Hallmark	
2025 (36th)	Sweethearts	Max	
2025 (36th)	Wynonna Earp: Vengeance	Tubi	
2026 (37th)	Queen of Coal‡	Netflix	
2026 (37th)	10Dance	Netflix	
2026 (37th)	The Christmas Baby	Hallmark	
2026 (37th)	Echo Valley	Apple TV	
2026 (37th)	Hedda	Amazon MGM Studios	
2026 (37th)	A Keller Christmas Vacation	Hallmark	
2026 (37th)	Noah's Arc: The Movie	Paramount+	
2026 (37th)	Oh. What. Fun.	Prime Video	
2026 (37th)	The Old Guard 2	Netflix	
2026 (37th)	The Parenting	HBO Max	
