= Diana Nyad =

American author & swimmer (born 1949)

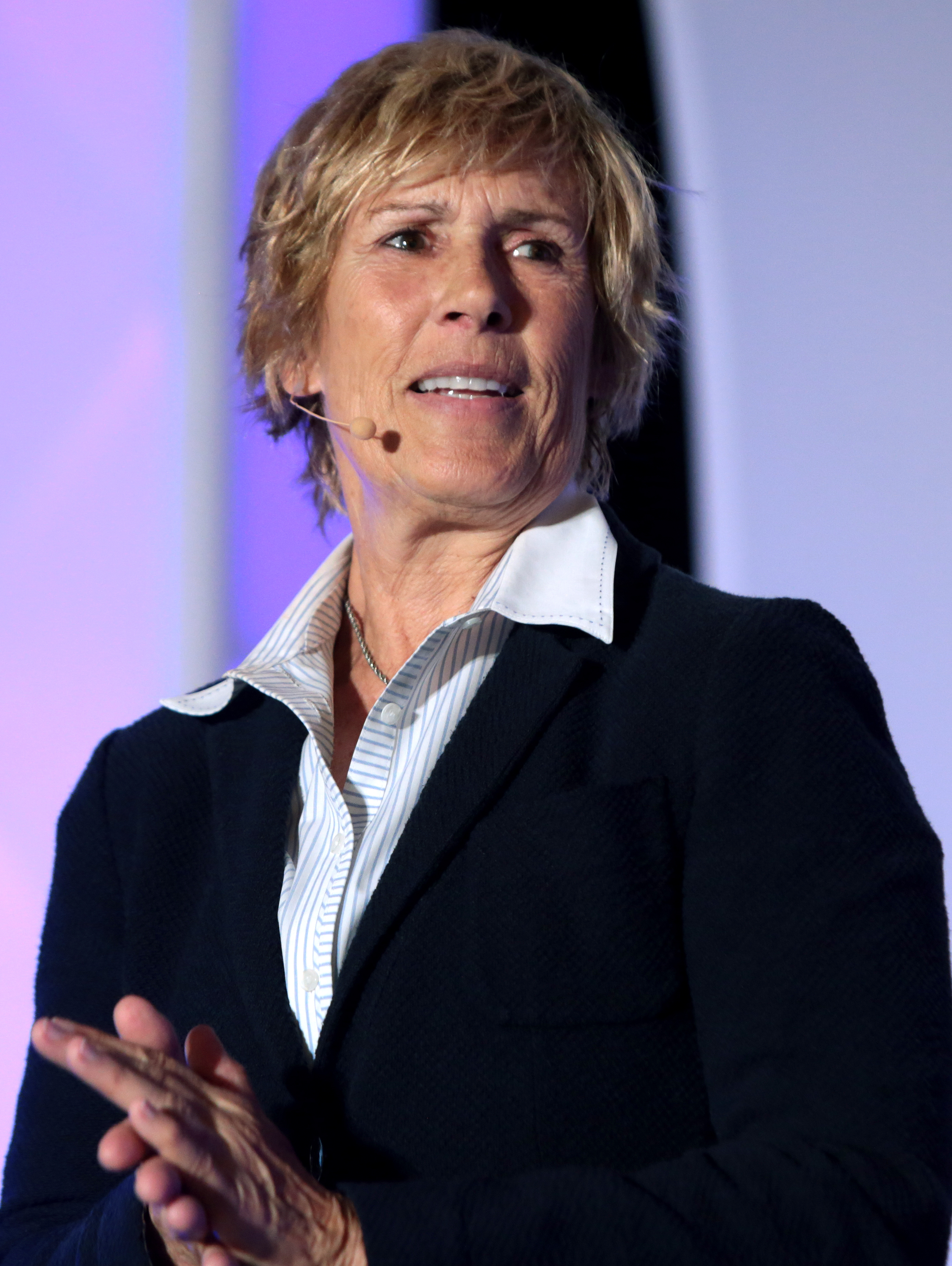
- Nyad in 2016
- Born: Diana Sneed; August 22, 1949 (age 77); New York City, U.S.
- Education: Lake Forest College (BA); New York University
- Occupations: Author, journalist, swimmer
- Known for: Championship swimming; endurance swimming; journalism; motivational speaking
- Website: www.diananyad.com

Diana Nyad /ˈnaɪˌæd/ (née Sneed; born August 22, 1949) is an American author, journalist, motivational speaker, and long-distance swimmer. Nyad gained national attention in 1975 when she swam around Manhattan (28 mi or 45 km) in record time.

She has written four books and articles for various publications, hosted the public radio program The Savvy Traveler, appeared on the television shows CBS News Sunday Morning and Dancing with the Stars, and been a long-time contributor to the public radio programs All Things Considered and Marketplace.

In 2013, on her fifth attempt and at age 64, she claims (it has never been ratified) that she swam from Havana, Cuba, to Key West, Florida, a journey of 110 mi (180 km), completing the third known swim crossing of the Florida Straits after Walter Poenisch in 1978 and Susie Maroney in 1997. Both of those earlier efforts involved a shark cage and, in Poenisch's case, fins and several short rests on his escort craft. Nyad did not use fins or a cage, but did swim with a protective jellyfish suit, shark divers, and electronic shark repellent devices. Her crossing from Cuba to Florida was not conducted under the supervision of an organized sporting association, and ratification of the accomplishment was later denied by the World Open Water Swimming Association (WOWSA) for various reasons including incomplete observer logs with a 9-hour undocumented gap in observations, conflicting crew reports, nearly a decade of delay in providing documentation to seek formal ratification, dubious claims about the rules followed for the swim, and "backdated and falsified documentation". Guinness World Records initially certified Nyad's achievement, but revoked its certification after considering the findings by WOWSA.

Her 2013 swim and partnership with athlete and businesswoman Bonnie Stoll were dramatized in the 2023 film Nyad, based on her 2015 memoir Find a Way.

== Early life and education ==
Nyad was born in New York City on August 22, 1949, to Lucy Winslow Curtis (1925–2007) and stockbroker William L. Sneed Jr. Her mother was a great-granddaughter of Charlotte N. Winslow, the inventor of Mrs Winslow's Soothing Syrup, a popular morphine-based medicine for children's teething pain that was manufactured from 1849 until the 1930s. She is also a great-grandniece of women's-rights activist Laura Curtis Bullard.

The Sneeds divorced in 1952, after which Lucy Sneed married a man known as Aristotle Z. Nyad, who later was revealed to be Aris Notaras, an individual with multiple aliases. Notaras, who had a complex history involving legal issues and a conviction for smuggling, adopted Diana following the marriage. The family moved to Fort Lauderdale, Florida, where she began swimming seriously in seventh grade.

She was enrolled at the private Pine Crest School in the mid-1960s, swimming under the tutelage of Olympian and Hall of Fame coach Jack Nelson who, she has said, molested her beginning when she was age 14 and continued until she graduated from high school. She has also said she learned several years later that another girl who trained under Nelson had also been molested, and said the two of them had brought their accusation to the headmaster of the school, but that no clear action was taken and Nelson resigned at the end of that school year. She won two Florida state high school championships in the backstroke at 100 yards. She dreamed of swimming in the 1968 Summer Olympics, but in 1966 she spent three months in bed with endocarditis, an infection of the heart, and when she began swimming again she had lost speed.

After graduating from Pine Crest School in 1967, she entered Emory University, but was expelled for jumping from a fourth-floor dormitory window wearing a parachute. She then enrolled at Lake Forest College in Illinois, where she resumed swimming, concentrating on distance events. She soon came to the attention of Buck Dawson, director of the International Swimming Hall of Fame in Florida, who introduced her to marathon swimming. She began training at his Girl's Camp "Camp Ak-O-Mak" in Magnetawan, Ontario and set a women's course record of 4 hours and 23 minutes in her first race, a 10-mile (16 km) swim in Lake Ontario in July 1970, finishing 10th overall. After graduating from Lake Forest College in 1973 with a degree in English and French, Nyad then enrolled in a PhD program for Comparative Literature at New York University in 1973 and also pursued her marathon swimming career.

== Career ==
Nyad has written four books: Other Shores (1978) about her life and distance swimming, Basic Training for Women (1981) describing a physical fitness program for women, Boss of Me: The Keyshawn Johnson Story (1999) about NFL wide receiver Keyshawn Johnson, and Find a Way (2015) about her quest to swim across the Florida Straits. She has also written for The New York Times, Newsweek, and other publications. Nyad and former professional racquetball player Bonnie Stoll formed a company called BravaBody which is aimed at providing online exercise advice to women over 40.

Nyad succeeded Rudy Maxa as host of the public radio program The Savvy Traveler, produced by Minnesota Public Radio, in July 2001 and remained host until the show ended in 2004.

Nyad was the subject of a short documentary "Diana" by the digital channel WIGS in 2012. As of 2006, she was a (long-time) weekly contributor to the National Public Radio afternoon news show All Things Considered (appearing on Thursdays), as well as the "business of sport" commentator for the American Public Media public radio program Marketplace business news. She was also a regular contributor to the CBS News television show Sunday Morning.

An analysis of Nyad's ability to dissociate during her marathon swims was covered by James W. Pipkin.

The documentary film The Other Shore was released in early 2013, some months before Nyad's swim from Cuba to Florida. In her 1978 autobiography, Nyad described marathon swimming as a battle for survival against a brutal foe—the sea—and the only victory possible is to "touch the other shore".

=== Squash ===
Nyad played in the 1979 Women's World Open Squash Championship, where she lost in the first round to Swedish player Katarina Due-Boje. The same year, she was part of U.S. national team at the World Team Championships. They finished, without winning a match, as 6th.

=== Distance swimming in the 1970s ===
- 1974: In June 1974, Nyad set a women's course record of 8 hours, 11 minutes in a 22-mile (35 km) race in the Gulf of Naples.
- 1975: At age 26, Nyad swam 28 miles (45 km) around the island of Manhattan (New York City) in just under 8 hours (7 hours 57 minutes), breaking a 48-year-old record (unofficial, set by Byron Sommers in 1927). An account of her swim was published in the New York Times the next day.
- 1978: At age 28 she first attempted to swim from Havana, Cuba to Key West, one year after the Kennedy-era travel restrictions were lifted. Diving into the ocean at 2 p.m. on Sunday, August 13 from Ortegosa Beach (50 miles; 80 km west of Havana), she swam inside a 20-by-40-foot (6.1 m × 12.2 m) steel shark cage for nearly 42 hours, then team doctors removed her around 7 a.m. on the morning of Tuesday, August 15, due to strong easterly winds and 8-foot (2.4 m) swells that were slamming her against the cage and pushing her off-course towards Texas. She had covered about 76 miles (122 km), but not in a straight line.
- 1979: On her 30th birthday (August 21–22, 1979), in what was to be her last "competitive" swim (at least until 2013), she swam from North Bimini Island, Bahamas, to Juno Beach, Florida (without using a protective shark cage or a wetsuit), an endeavor contemporaneous reports gave as 60 and 89 miles. Later accounts increased the distance to 102.5.

=== Cuba to Florida swim attempts in 2011–2013 ===
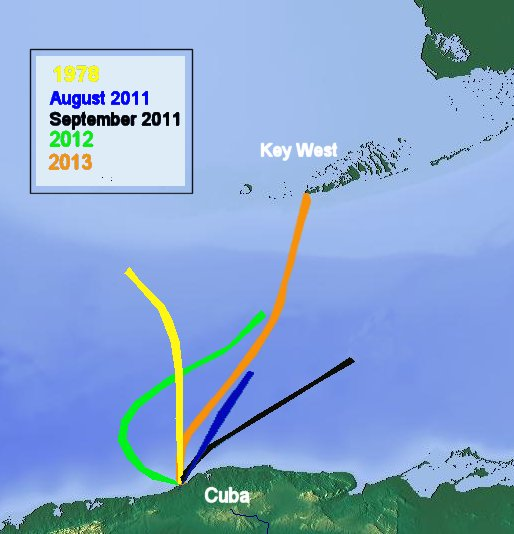
Nyad's Havana to Key West swimming routes since 1978

==== Preparations ====
By early January 2010 Nyad began training for a summer attempt to swim from Cuba to Florida, a distance of over 110 miles (180 km) which is the equivalent of five English Channel swims via the Strait of Dover. Taking up residence in the Caribbean island of St. Maarten from January through June, she went for 8-, 10-, 12-, and 14-hour-long swims every other week. She then moved her training to Key West and, while waiting for favorable weather conditions, she embarked on a 24-hour swim. On July 10, she reserved a 35-foot fishing vessel to take her 40 miles (64 km) out to sea. At 8:19 AM she jumped overboard and began swimming back towards Key West, with the boat following her. At 8:19 AM the next day her handlers helped her back on board, still about 10 miles (16 km) from land: she said she felt "tired and dehydrated" but still "strong" and "easily able to swim another 20 hours without any problem."

On July 10, 2010, at the age of 60, she began open water training in preparation for a 60-hour, 103-mile (166 km) swim from Cuba to Florida, a task she had failed to accomplish thirty years prior. When asked about her motivation, she answered "Because I'd like to prove to the other 60-year-olds that it is never too late to start your dreams." She was scheduled to make the swim in August/September 2010, but bad weather forced her to cancel; she rescheduled for July 2011. In an October 15, 2010, interview with CNN, Nyad said she was trained and would be ready to swim by July 23.

While training in St. Maarten, she sat for an interview that was published March 25, 2011, by the island's online news agency, The Daily Herald, remarking that "It's a large operation, like an expedition. We've got about 25 people, navigators, managers, boat crew, weather routers, medical people, shark experts, you name it. That's the time also when the water starts to get to its hottest. I need the hottest possible ocean. As soon as we hit the right forecast, we'll be off to Havana. We won't know the exact starting point probably until the night before. And we don't know exactly where landfall will be...I'd love to wind up in Key West, but it will depend on trajectory of the Gulf Stream." Nyad estimated that the cost of her "expedition" was about $500,000.

Nyad moved her training site from the Caribbean island of St. Maarten to Key West, Florida in June 2011. She was joined by key members of her support team on June 28, to wait for ideal weather conditions that typically occur only during the summer doldrums in July and August. For the marathon swim to be feasible, two main weather conditions needed to come together at the same time: a combination of low-to-light winds (to minimize sea chop), and water temperatures in the high 80s °F (high 20s/low 30s °C). These relatively "high" water temperatures produce a twin challenge: in the first half of her swim, the warm water would dehydrate her body, while in the second half, her body temperature would drop and she would face potential hypothermia. Nyad had bulked up her physique to about 150 pounds/70 kg (15 pounds/7 kg more than she weighed in 2010) to help counter the loss of body mass during her grueling swim.

Nyad was to be escorted by a paddler in a kayak equipped with an electronic shark repellent known as a Shark Shield.

To keep Nyad swimming in a straight line, her specially designed, slow-moving catamaran support boat deployed a 10-foot (3.0 m) streamer: a long pole keeps the streamer several yards away from the boat, and the streamer was designed to remain about 5 feet underwater, so that Nyad can swim above it, much like following a lane line in a swimming pool. At night, the white streamer was replaced by a string of red LED lights. Writing in her blog in July 2011, Nyad stated that the development of the submerged guide streamer, in early summer 2011, may be the single greatest aid to her marathon swim. In all of her previous swims, she had trouble keeping the support boat in sight and was prone to veer off-course. Keeping a boat headed in a straight line, in the ocean, while moving at only 1 to 2 knots is very difficult, and her catamaran was equipped with thrusters and a special sea anchor (in case of following seas) to stabilize its course.

Several experts who attended the 2011 Global Open Water Swimming Conference in New York City on June 17–19, 2011, expressed their strong belief that Nyad had both the physical ability and the positive mental stamina to be able to complete the Cuba-to-Florida swim. However, a record stretch of high winds and dropping water temperatures prevented her from making the attempt at the time.

==== Second attempt ====
Thirty-three years after her first attempt in 1978, Nyad entered the water again at Havana on August 7, 2011, at 7:45PM, with a CNN news team on board her support ship to provide live coverage of her swim, which involved electronic "Shark Shields" but no shark cage. Nyad stopped her attempt early in the morning on August 9 at 12:45AM after 29 hours in the water, after encountering strong currents and winds that pushed her miles off course to the east. Nyad also said she had been suffering shoulder pain since her third hour in the water, but what made her abandon the effort was a flare-up of her asthma, such that, throughout the final hour, she could only swim a few strokes before repeatedly having to roll on her back to catch her breath.

==== Third attempt ====
On September 23, 2011, Nyad began a third attempt at the Cuba-to-Florida swim, again without a shark cage, but stopped after 41 hours, about 67 nautical miles (124 km) through the 103 nautical miles (191 km) passage, because of jellyfish and Portuguese man-of-war stings and after currents pushed her off course. Nyad's October 2011 TED talk described how box jellyfish stings on her forearm and neck caused respiratory distress that eventually caused the swim to end.

==== Fourth attempt ====
On August 18, 2012, Nyad began her fourth attempt, without a protective shark cage. Nyad and her team ended the swim at 12:55 a.m. on August 21, 2012, reportedly because of two storms and nine jellyfish stings, after having covered more distance than her three previous attempts.

==== Fifth attempt ====
On the morning of August 31, 2013, Nyad began her fifth bid to swim from Havana, Cuba, to Florida, a distance of about 110 miles (180 km), accompanied by a 35-person support team, swimming without a shark cage but protected from jellyfish by a silicone mask, a full bodysuit, gloves and booties. She was also accompanied by vessels using electronic 'Shark Shield' deterrent devices, and at times by shark divers. At approximately 1:55 pm EDT on September 2, 2013, Nyad reached the beach in Key West, about 53 hours after she began her journey.

While not directly questioning the authenticity of her story, some skeptics, including experienced marathon swimmers, requested the swim's GPS history, surface current, weather, and Nyad's eating and drinking data. The swim's published GPS data were analyzed and graphed on September 8 by The New York Times. After Nyad's September 10 response to questions and her publishing path data and notes from her navigator and two observers, a University of Miami oceanography professor, Tamay Ozgokmen, confirmed the navigator's statement that favorable Gulf Stream currents explained Nyad's apparently incredible total velocity during certain portions of the swim. On September 10, 2013, Nyad appeared on The Ellen DeGeneres Show explaining that while she swims she remembers Stephen Hawking books, sings, counts numbers, and has vivid hallucinations of The Wizard of Oz and the yellow brick road. On September 12, 2013, Nyad said, "We swam fair and square, squeaky clean across that thing". The New York Times public editor observed on September 19 that the focus had shifted from serious questions about possibly resting aboard a boat, to more technical issues relating to whether her crew members touching her, and her wearing a protective suit, rendered the swim "assisted". Nyad has expressed her belief that wearing the jellyfish-protection suit was a life-and-death measure that for her superseded the traditions of the sport.

Her crossing from Cuba to Florida has never been formally ratified due to the lack of independent observers and incomplete records. In 2022 the World Open Water Swimming Association (WOWSA) issued a comprehensive report, updated in 2023, amassing a trove of information available detailing Nyad's 2013 crossing. In September 2023, WOWSA renewed an investigation into her 2013 swim and once again declined to certify the swim. This further investigation considered assertions and documentation purporting that the swim had been completed using the rules and procedures of an organization called the Florida Straits Open Water Swimming Association (FSOWSA), but the organization and its alleged rules did not exist at the time of the swim. Additionally, the observer logs for the swim were incomplete, with over 9 hours of the critical overnight period undocumented, and there were conflicting accounts from crew members regarding events that transpired during these hours. Guinness World Records revoked their initial recognition of Nyad's swim as a certified world record.

=== October 2013 charity swim ===
From October 8 to 10, 2013, Nyad participated in "Swim for Relief" by doing a 48-hour continuous swim in New York City's Herald Square in a specially constructed, 120-foot long, two lane pool. It raised $105,001.00 for AmeriCares to benefit the victims of Hurricane Sandy.

=== Dancing with the Stars performances ===
On March 4, 2014, Nyad was announced as one of the celebrities to compete on the 18th season of Dancing with the Stars, in which she finished in last place. She was partnered with professional dancer Henry Byalikov.

Week #	Dance/song	Judges' score			Result
Week #	Dance/song	Inaba	Goodman	Tonioli	Result
1	Foxtrot / "Beyond the Sea"	6	6	6	No Elimination
2	Cha-cha-cha / "Move Your Feet"	no score given			Eliminated

=== Other media appearances ===
In 1989, Nyad was a guest correspondent on an episode of Unsolved Mysteries about Alcatraz. She assisted on a segment that detailed real-life, current reenactments of both kayakers and a swimmer attempting to traverse San Francisco Bay.

Nyad appeared in the Macy Gray music video for the song "Bang, Bang" in 2014.

Also in 2014, Nyad performed a solo play (which she had also written) called Onward – The Diana Nyad story, which premiered that year at the NoHo Arts Centre Theater in Los Angeles, directed by Josh Ravetch.

== Controversy ==
=== Investigations over 2013 swim ===
As discussed above, Nyad's 2013 crossing from Cuba to Florida has never been formally ratified due to the lack of independent observers, incomplete records, and other irregularities. WOWSA issued extensive reports on the matter, and Guinness World Records revoked its initial certification of the swim as a world record.

In September 2023, WOWSA renewed its investigation into her swim and again declined to certify it. Remarking on the upcoming release of a film that dramatizes the event, WOWSA said "It is important for viewers to understand that this film is based on Diana Nyad's book, which has not been rigorously fact-checked." WOWSA was also critical of actions previously taken by Steven Munatones, the former owner and founder of WOWSA, saying "His shifting roles have contributed to a decade-long controversy surrounding Nyad's swim".

=== Embellishment allegations ===
Retired marathon swimmer Daniel Slosberg accused Nyad of having a long history of embellishing her own accomplishments, often in such a way as to overshadow other swimmers. In 2023 she responded by admitting to the Los Angeles Times: "Am I embarrassed to have inflated my own record when my record is pretty good on its own? Yes, it makes me cringe." She further said that "I thought we had provided all the proof we needed. And maybe I had too much hubris, like, 'I don’t need to prove this to anybody.' That’s my bad. But it wasn’t to obfuscate the rules. We were never told, 'You’ve got to do this or you won't be ratified'".

== Accolades ==
Nyad was inducted into the United States National Women's Sports Hall of Fame in 1986. She is also an International Marathon Swimming Hall of Fame Honoree (1978) and an ISHOF Al Schoenfield Media Award recipient (2002). She is a Hall of Famer at her Lake Forest College in Illinois and at Pine Crest School in Fort Lauderdale.

2014

- Nyad was awarded the first ESPN Sports Science Newton Award for Outstanding New Limit.
- Nyad was awarded the L.A. Sports Council's Athlete of the Year award.
- She was inducted into the National Gay and Lesbian Sports Hall of Fame.
- Nyad received the Jack LaLanne Award.
- She received the Orden al Mérito Deportivo (Order of Sporting Merit) Award from Cuba.
- A bronze plaque honoring Nyad was unveiled on a concrete wall bordering Smathers Beach, where she ended her Cuba-to-Florida swim.
- Nyad was named one of National Geographic's Adventurers of the Year.

2015

- Nyad was shown in Marie Claire magazine's "The 8 Greatest Moments for Women in Sports".
- Chapter 30 of the book The Right Side of History: 100 Years of LGBTQ Activism, written by Rita Mae Brown, was written about Nyad.

== Personal life ==
Nyad is a lesbian and has been open about her sexual orientation in numerous magazine articles and interviews.

Nyad has said that overcoming her childhood sexual abuse was a factor in her determination while swimming, and she has spoken publicly about this issue.

== In popular culture ==
Annette Bening portrayed Nyad in 2023's Nyad, directed by Elizabeth Chai Vasarhelyi and Jimmy Chin. When questioned in relation to the accuracy and controversy surrounding Nyad's Cuba-to-Florida swim, Vasarhelyi responded "Our film is not about a record [...] It's about how a woman woke up at 60 and realized she wasn't finished, even though the world may be finished with her." Bening was nominated for the Academy Award for Best Actress for her performance as Nyad.
