= Bonnie Stoll =

American athlete and businesswoman

Bonnie Sue Stoll
- Born: Bonnie Sue Stoll; June 10, 1952 (age 74); Stamford, Connecticut, U.S.
- Education: University of Connecticut (BS)

Bonnie Sue Stoll (born June 10, 1952) is an American athlete and businesswoman. She is a co-founder of Everwalk, a national walking and women's health initiative, with Diana Nyad. Stoll has also worked as an athletic trainer for celebrities and professional athletes.

As a professional racquetball player, she was ranked number three in the world in 1984. She competed in the Ladies Professional Racquetball Tour throughout the 1980s.

== Life and career ==
Stoll was born and raised in Stamford, Connecticut, the daughter of Jewish parents Lila (née Velcoff, 1926–2021) and Herbert Stoll (1926–2005). She has an older brother, Barry, and a younger sister, Robin. Stoll graduated from Rippowam School in 1970 and the University of Connecticut in 1975 with a degree in Physiology. For a short time she taught at the high school level and coached field hockey. She decided to pursue a different career path and moved to California, where she settled in Los Angeles. There she became a professional racquetball player and personal trainer.

Her success encouraged her to become an entrepreneur and she had further success through her partnership with Diana Nyad. Stoll and Nyad met at the Stamford Racquetball Club where Stoll was a head pro instructor. The two created an athletic coaching company called BravaBody, which included fitness videos and tutorials. Stoll and Nyad have matching tattoos that say Ishin-denshin (以心伝心). During an interview with Oprah Winfrey, Nyad said the tattoos symbolize how she and Stoll can communicate without speaking and how important that connection is for personal training/athletic coaching.

Stoll also has an interest in art and photography and owns a large personal collection of artwork.

== Portrayal in media ==
Stoll was portrayed in the 2023 drama film Nyad by Jodie Foster. Foster received acclaim for her performance and multiple nominations including for the Academy Award for Best Supporting Actress. In 2019, Stoll appeared Off-Broadway as herself in the play The Swimmer at the Minetta Lane Theatre. The play was recorded and is available on Audible.
