= Jodie Foster filmography =

List of acting performances

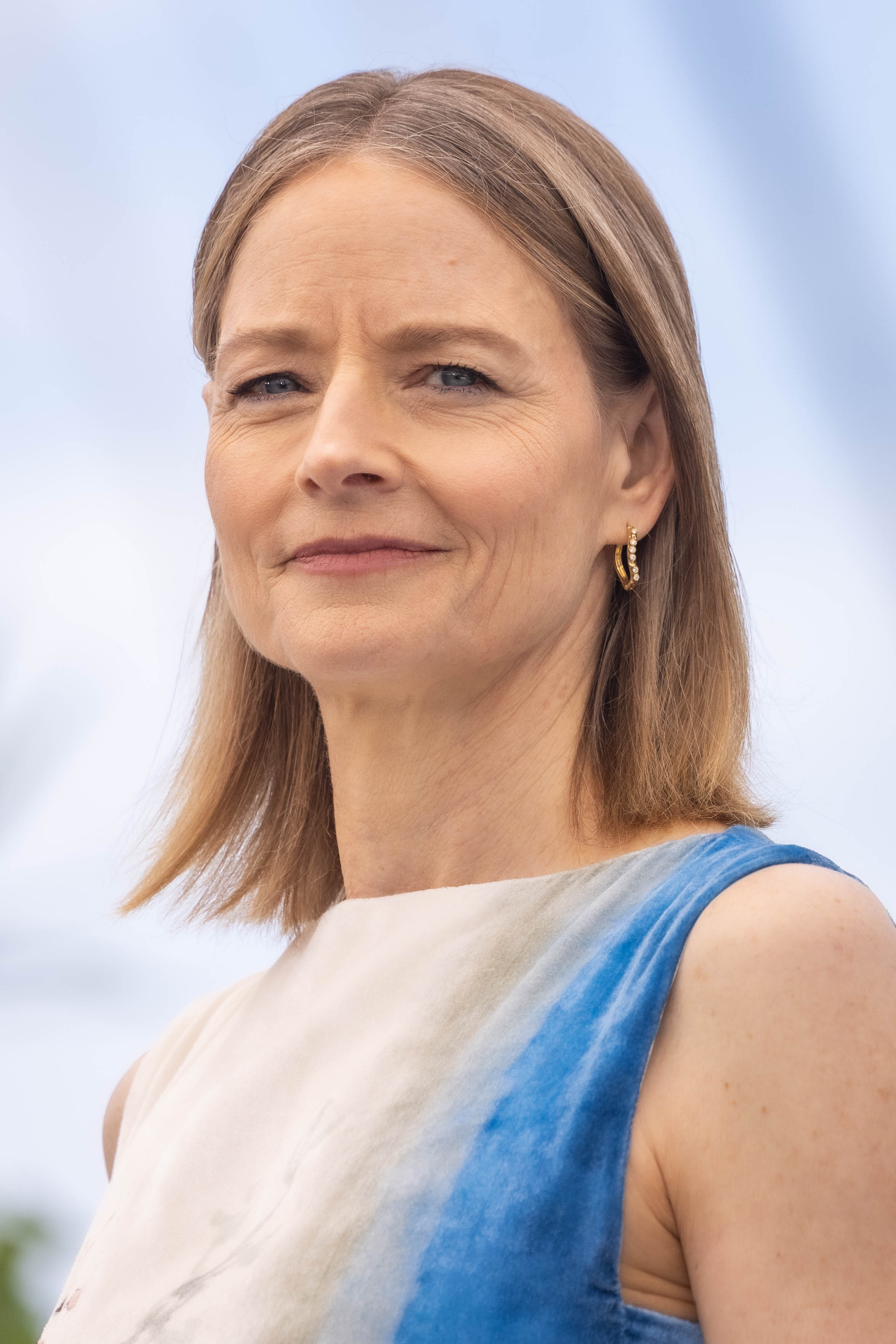
- Foster at the Cannes premiere of Vie privée (2025)
- Feature films: 57
- Television: 37
- Commercials: 16

Jodie Foster is an American actress and filmmaker. Regarded as one of the greatest and most accomplished actors of her generation, Foster is known for her selectivity and playing intellectually complex, strong willed female protagonists. A career spanning six decades, Foster's career spans from being a successful child actor to an influential cinematic figure as an adult, a rarity in cinema. Over her six decades long career, Foster has starred in over 50 feature films and 30 television shows.

Foster began her professional career as a child model at age three appearing in a Coppertone commercial. Following appearances in numerous advertisements, she made her television debut at age five, in a 1968 episode of the sitcom Mayberry R.F.D., following which she guest-starred in numerous television shows including Gunsmoke, The Doris Day Show, The Courtship of Eddie's Father, My Three Sons, Bonanza, Paper Moon, and Kung Fu. Foster made her feature film debut with Disney's adventure film Napoleon and Samantha (1972). Following notable appearances as Becky Thatcher in the musical film Tom Sawyer (1973), and in Martin Scorsese's Alice Doesn't Live Here Anymore (1974), Foster rose to international prominence in 1976 at age 13 with four prominent releases: Taxi Driver, Bugsy Malone, Freaky Friday, and The Little Girl Who Lives Down the Lane, with the first of these earning Foster her first nomination for an Academy Award. She continued to garner praise and became a teen idol with starring roles in an array of films, including Candleshoe (1977), and Foxes (1980). During this period, Foster also made numerous European films, including the French comedy-drama Moi, fleur bleue (1977), and the Italian comedy Casotto (1978). By the end of the decade, Foster established herself as the most prominent child actor of the era.

A child prodigy, Foster decided to take a sabbatical from acting at the height of her teenage stardom for four years to attend Yale University. During this period she made five movies including Claude Chabrol's television film Le sang des autres (1983), and Tony Richardson's comedy The Hotel New Hampshire (1984), however none of them were major successes and following her graduation, Foster struggled to find substantial work. She made a series of independent films, including the experimental film Siesta (1987), and the crime-drama Five Corners (1988), and also the 1988 severely overlooked but later beloved cult-classic Stealing Home for Warner Bros., before having her adult breakthrough with the legal drama The Accused (1988), for which she won her first Academy Award for Best Actress. Her second Academy Award came for her portrayal of Clarice Starling in the psychological horror The Silence of the Lambs (1991). Other successful films in the 1990s were Sommersby (1993), Maverick (1994), Nell (1994), Contact (1997), and Anna and the King (1999). Foster made her debut as a director at age 14, when she directed a short film for BBC. Her first major directorial work came with a 1988 episode of the horror anthology series Tales from the Darkside. She made her feature film directorial debut with the family drama Little Man Tate (1991), and during this decade directed holiday comedy-drama film Home for the Holidays (1995).

During the 2000s, Foster starred in Panic Room (2002), The Dangerous Lives of Altar Boys (2002), A Very Long Engagement (2004), Flightplan (2005), Inside Man (2006), The Brave One (2007), and Nim's Island (2008). By 2005, Foster was named the world's highest-paid actress. During the 2010s, Foster focused more on directing and made her acting appearances intermittent, starring in just three films, Carnage (2011), Elysium (2013), and Hotel Artemis (2018). Her directorial work during this decade includes the films The Beaver (2011) and Money Monster (2016), and episodes of the television shows Orange Is the New Black, House of Cards, Black Mirror, and Tales from the Loop.

During the 2020s, Foster returned to more frequent acting work, winning her fourth Golden Globe Award for portraying attorney Nancy Hollander in the legal drama The Mauritanian (2021), and received her fifth Academy Award nomination for her portrayal of swimming coach Bonnie Stoll in the Netflix biopic Nyad (2023). Foster appeared in her first starring role on television and her first acting appearance in the medium in five decades as Chief Liz Danvers in the fourth season of HBO's crime anthology series True Detective, winning the Primetime Emmy Award for Outstanding Lead Actress in a Limited or Anthology Series or Movie.

== Acting credits ==
Key
†	Denotes works that have not yet been released

=== Film ===
Year	Title	Role	Notes
1972	Napoleon and Samantha	Samantha	
1972	Kansas City Bomber	Rita	
1973	Tom Sawyer	Becky Thatcher	
1973	One Little Indian	Martha McIver	
1974	Alice Doesn't Live Here Anymore	Audrey	
1976	Taxi Driver	Iris Steensma	
1976	Echoes of a Summer	Deirdre Striden	
1976	Bugsy Malone	Tallulah	
1976	The Little Girl Who Lives Down the Lane	Rynn Jacobs	
1976	Freaky Friday	Annabel Andrews / Ellen Andrews	
1977	Moi, fleur bleue	Isabelle Tristan / Fleur Bleue	
1977	Casotto	Teresina Fedeli	
1977	Candleshoe	Casey Brown	
1980	Foxes	Jeanie	
1980	Carny	Donna	
1982	O'Hara's Wife	Barbara O'Hara	
1984	The Hotel New Hampshire	Frannie Berry	
1986	Mesmerized	Victoria Thompson	
1987	Siesta	Nancy	
1988	Five Corners	Linda	
1988	Stealing Home	Katie Chandler	
1988	The Accused	Sarah Tobias	
1990	Catchfire	Anne Benton	
1991	The Silence of the Lambs	Clarice Starling	
1991	Little Man Tate	Dede Tate	
1991	Shadows and Fog	Dorrie	
1993	Sommersby	Laurel Sommersby	
1993	It Was a Wonderful Life	Narrator	Voice; Documentary
1994	Maverick	Mrs. Annabelle Bransford	
1994	Nell	Nell Kellty	
1997	Contact	Dr. Eleanor Arroway	
1999	Anna and the King	Anna Leonowens	
2002	The Dangerous Lives of Altar Boys	Sister Assumpta	
2002	Panic Room	Meg Altman	
2003	Abby Singer	Herself	
2004	A Very Long Engagement	Elodie Gordes	
2005	Flightplan	Kyle Pratt	
2006	Inside Man	Madeline White	
2007	The Brave One	Erica Bain	
2008	Nim's Island	Alexandra Rover	
2009	Motherhood	Herself	
2011	The Beaver	Meredith Black	
2011	Carnage	Penelope Longstreet	
2013	Elysium	Secretary of Defense Jessica Delacourt	
2018	Be Natural: The Untold Story of Alice Guy-Blaché	Narrator	Voice; Documentary
2018	Hotel Artemis	Jean Thomas / The Nurse	
2019	Love, Antosha	Herself	Documentary
2021	The Mauritanian	Nancy Hollander	
2023	Nyad	Bonnie Stoll	
2025	A Private Life	Lilian Steiner	
2025	Breakdown: 1975	Narrator	Voice; Documentary
2026	Hexed †	Queen Celeste	Voice

=== Television ===
Year	Title	Role	Notes
1968–1970	Mayberry R.F.D.	Fairy / Little Girl	2 episodes
1969	The Doris Day Show	Jenny Benson	1 episode
1969–1971	The Courtship of Eddie's Father	Joey Kelly	5 episodes
1969	Julia	Cindy Blanchard	1 episode
1969–1972	Gunsmoke	Susan Sadler / Patricia / Marieanne	3 episodes
1970	Menace on the Mountain	Suellen McIver	TV movie
1970	Daniel Boone	Rachel	1 episode
1970	Adam-12	Mary Bennett	1 episode
1970	Nanny and the Professor	Angela	1 episode
1971	My Three Sons	Priscilla Hobson	6 episodes
1972	Bonanza	'Bluebird'	1 episode
1972	Ghost Story	Judy	1 episode
1972	The Paul Lynde Show	Maggie	1 episode
1972	The New Scooby-Doo Movies	Pugsley Addams	1 episode
1972	My Sister Hank	Henrietta 'Hank' Bennett	TV movie
1972	The Amazing Chan and the Chan Clan	Anne Chan	Voice; 16 episodes
1972	Ironside	Pip Morrison	1 episode
1973	Bob & Carol & Ted & Alice	Elizabeth Henderson	5 episodes
1973	Rookie of the Year	Sharon Lee	TV movie
1973	ABC Afterschool Special	Sue	1 episode
1973	The Partridge Family	Julie	1 episode
1973	Love Story	Ellie Madison	1 episode
1973	Kung Fu	Alethea Patricia Ingram	1 episode
1973	The New Perry Mason	Hildy Haynes	1 episode
1973	The Addams Family	Pugsley Addams	Voice; 16 episodes
1974	Smile, Jenny, You're Dead	Liberty Cole	TV movie
1974	Paper Moon	Addie Loggins	13 episodes
1975	Medical Center	Ivy	1 episode
1975	The Secret Life of T. K. Dearing	T.K. Dearing	TV movie
1976	Saturday Night Live	Herself (host)	Episode: "Jodie Foster/Brian Wilson"
1983	Svengali	Zoe Alexander	TV movie
1984	The Blood of Others	Hélène Bertrand	TV movie
1996	Frasier	Marlene	Voice; Episode: "Moon Dance"
1997	The X-Files	Betty	Voice; Episode: "Never Again"
2005	Statler and Waldorf: From the Balcony	Herself	Episode 8
2009	The Simpsons	Maggie Simpson	Voice; Episode: "Four Great Women and a Manicure"
2014	Makers: Women Who Make America	Narrator	Voice; Episode: "Women in Space"
2024	True Detective	Liz Danvers	6 episodes (season 4)

== Filmmaker credits ==
Director
Year	Title	Notes
1988	Tales from the Darkside	Episode: "Do Not Open This Box"
1991	Little Man Tate	
1995	Home for the Holidays	
2011	The Beaver	
2013–2014	Orange Is the New Black	Two episodes ("Lesbian Request Denied", "Thirsty Bird")
2014	House of Cards	Episode: "Chapter 22"
2016	Money Monster	
2017	Black Mirror	Episode: "Arkangel"
2020	Tales from the Loop	Episode: "Home"

Producer
Year	Title	Notes
1986	Mesmerized	Co-producer
1994	Nell	
1995	Home for the Holidays	
1998	The Baby Dance	Television film; Executive producer
2000	Waking the Dead	Executive producer
2002	The Dangerous Lives of Altar Boys	
2007	The Brave One	Executive producer
2020	Be Natural: The Untold Story of Alice Guy-Blaché	Documentary; Executive producer
2024	True Detective: Night Country	Executive producer
2024	Alok	Executive producer

== See also ==
- List of awards and nominations received by Jodie Foster
