= List of awards and nominations received by Jodie Foster =

Jodie Foster awards and nominations
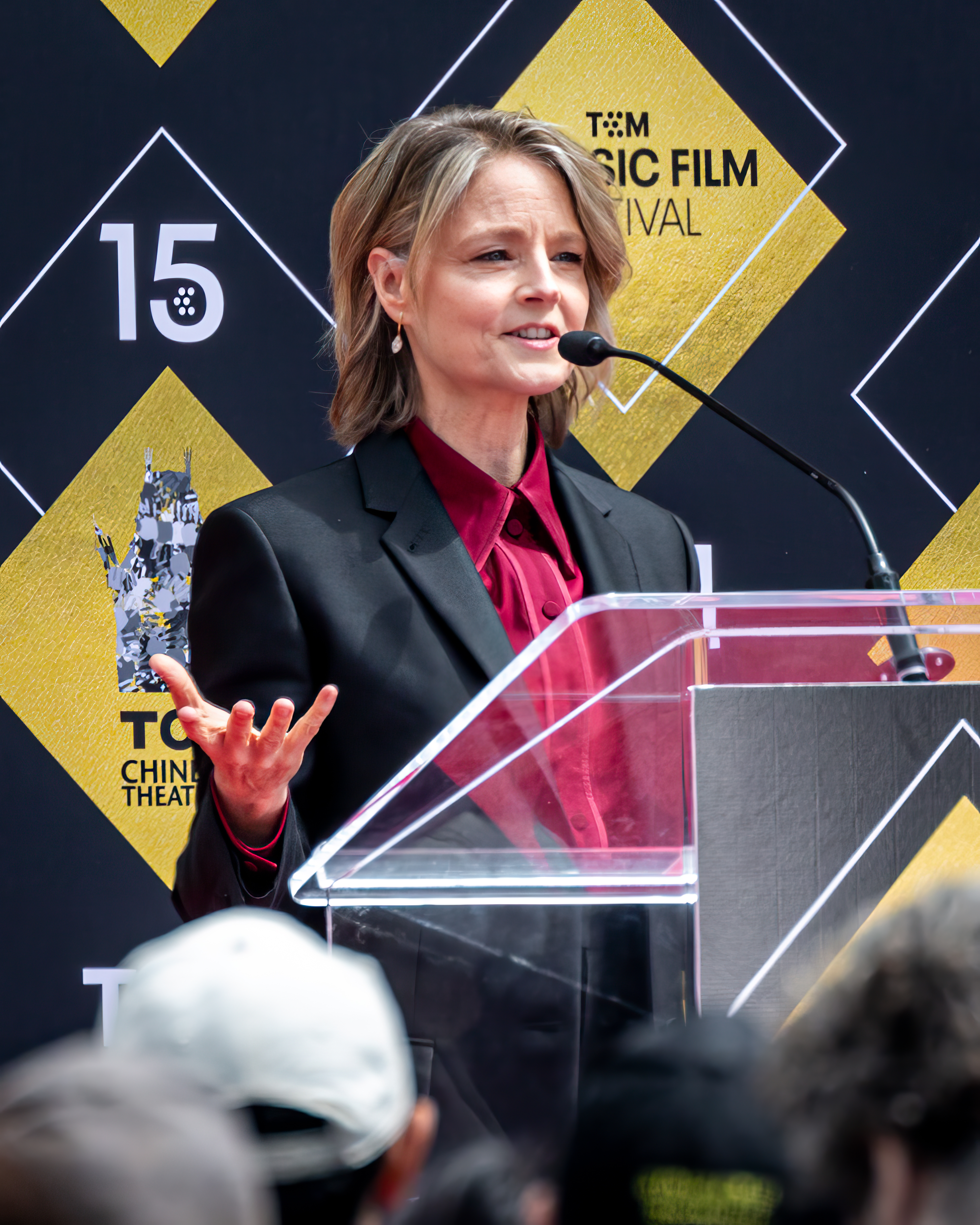
- Foster in 2024
Awards and nominations
Award	Wins	Nominations
Academy Awards	2	5
Actor Awards	1	3
BAFTA Awards	3	5
Directors Guild of America Awards	0	2
Emmy Awards	1	6
Golden Globe Awards	4	13
Grammy Awards	0	1
Producers Guild of America Awards	0	1

Totals (Note: Certain award groups do not simply award one winner. They acknowledge several different recipients, have runners-up, and have third place. Since this is a specific recognition and is different from losing an award, runner-up mentions are considered wins in this award tally. For simplification and to avoid errors, each award in this list has been presumed to have had a prior nomination.)
- Wins: 150
- Nominations: 320

The following is the list of awards and nominations received by actress and filmmaker Jodie Foster. One of the most awarded thespians of her generation, Foster in her six decades long career has received numerous accolades; both competitive and honorary. Her major competitive wins include two Academy Awards, four Golden Globe Awards, three British Academy Film Awards, a Primetime Emmy Award, an Independent Spirit Award, and an Actor Award. She has also been nominated one for Grammy Award, twice for the Directors Guild of America Awards and one Daytime Emmy Award.

== Major associations ==
=== Academy Awards ===
The Academy Awards are a set of awards given annually by the Academy of Motion Picture Arts and Sciences for excellence in cinematic achievements. Foster has won two awards out of six nominations. She holds the distinction of being the second person to win multiple Oscars before the age of 30 and the youngest person to win two acting Oscars. Foster is also the only openly LGBTQ woman to win multiple Academy Awards for acting, although she was not publicly out until after both wins.

Year	Nominated work	Category	Result	Ref.
1977	Taxi Driver	Best Supporting Actress	Nominated	
1989	The Accused	Best Actress	Won	
1992	The Silence of the Lambs	Best Actress	Won	
1995	Nell	Best Actress	Nominated	
2024	Nyad	Best Supporting Actress	Nominated	

=== Actor Awards ===
The Actor Awards, the only national network television show to acknowledge the work of union members and one of the major awards events in Hollywood since 1995, is an accolade given by the Screen Actors Guild (SAG) to recognize outstanding performances by its members. Foster has won the award once from three nominations.

Year	Nominated work	Category	Result	Ref.
1995	Nell	Outstanding Performance by a Female Actor in a Leading Role	Won	
2024	Nyad	Outstanding Performance by a Female Actor in a Supporting Role	Nominated	
2025	True Detective: Night Country	Outstanding Performance by a Female Actor in a Miniseries or Television Movie	Nominated	

=== BAFTA Awards ===
The British Academy Film Awards are presented in an annual award show hosted by the British Academy of Film and Television Arts (BAFTA), as the British equivalent of the Oscars. The ceremony used to take place in April or May, but from 2002 onwards it takes place in February in order to precede the Academy Awards in the United States. Foster has been nominated six times, winning thrice. Moreover, her win at the age of 13 in the Best Supporting Actress category made her the youngest BAFTA recipient.

Year	Nominated work	Category	Result	Ref.
British Academy Film Awards
1977	Bugsy Malone and Taxi Driver	Best Actress in a Supporting Role	Won	
1977	Bugsy Malone and Taxi Driver	Most Promising Newcomer to Leading Film Roles	Won	
1990	The Accused	Best Actress in a Leading Role	Nominated	
1992	The Silence of the Lambs	Best Actress in a Leading Role	Won	
British Academy Television Awards
2025	True Detective: Night Country	Best International Programme	Nominated	
Britannia Awards
2016	—N/a	Stanley Kubrick Britannia Award for Excellence in Film	Honored	

=== Emmy Awards ===
The Primetime Emmy Awards, considered as a TV equivalent to the Academy Awards for film in the U.S., are presented by the Academy of Television Arts & Sciences (ATAS), the National Academy of Television Arts and Sciences (NATAS), and the International Academy of Television Arts and Sciences in various sectors of the television industry including entertainment programming, news and documentary shows. Currently three annual ceremonies are held; for Primetime Emmy Awards (since 1949), Daytime Emmy Awards (since 1974), and International Emmy Awards (since 1973). Foster has won once from four nominations.

Year	Nominated work	Category	Result	Ref.
Primetime Emmy Awards
1999	The Baby Dance	Outstanding Television Movie (Note: nominated as producer)	Nominated	
2014	Orange Is the New Black: ("Lesbian Request Denied")	Outstanding Directing for a Comedy Series	Nominated	
2024	True Detective: Night Country	Outstanding Lead Actress in a Limited or Anthology Series or Movie	Won	
2024	True Detective: Night Country	Outstanding Limited or Anthology Series (Note: nominated as producer)	Nominated	
2026	The Beast in Me	Outstanding Limited or Anthology Series	Nominated	
2026	Breakdown: 1975	Outstanding Narrator	Nominated	
Daytime Emmy Awards
2001	AMC: Film Preservation Classics	Outstanding Special Class Special	Nominated	

=== Golden Globe Awards ===
The Golden Globe Award is an accolade presented by the members of the Hollywood Foreign Press Association (HFPA) to recognize excellence in film and television, both domestic and foreign. The formal ceremonies are presented annually as a major part of the film industry's awards season, culminating each year with the Oscars. At the age of 50, Foster became the 4th youngest recipient of the Cecil B. DeMille Award.

Year	Nominated work	Category	Result	Ref.
1977	Freaky Friday	Best Actress in a Motion Picture – Musical or Comedy	Nominated	
1989	The Accused (Note: Tied with Shirley MacLaine for Madame Sousatzka and Sigourney Weaver for Gorillas in the Mist.)	Best Actress in a Motion Picture – Drama	Won	
1992	The Silence of the Lambs	Best Actress in a Motion Picture – Drama	Won	
1995	Nell	Best Actress in a Motion Picture – Drama	Nominated	
1998	Contact	Best Actress in a Motion Picture – Drama	Nominated	
1999	The Baby Dance	Best Limited or Anthology Series or Television Film (Note: nominated as producer)	Nominated	
2008	The Brave One	Best Actress in a Motion Picture – Drama	Nominated	
2012	Carnage	Best Actress in a Motion Picture – Musical or Comedy	Nominated	
2013	—N/a	Cecil B. DeMille Award	Honored	
2021	The Mauritanian	Best Supporting Actress – Motion Picture	Won	
2024	Nyad	Best Supporting Actress – Motion Picture	Nominated	
2025	True Detective: Night Country	Best Actress – Miniseries or Television Film	Won	

=== Grammy Awards ===
Year	Nominated work	Category	Result	Ref.
1998	Contact	Best Spoken Word Album	Nominated	

=== Directors Guild of America Awards ===
The Directors Guild of America Awards are issued annually by the Directors Guild of America. The first DGA Award was an “Honorary Life Member” award issued in 1938 to D. W. Griffith. The statues are made by New York firm, Society Awards. Foster has received two nominations.

Year	Nominated work	Category	Result	Ref.
2014	House of Cards (Note: Chapter 22)	Outstanding Directorial Achievement in Dramatic Series	Nominated	
2014	Orange Is the New Black (Note: Thirsty Bird)	Outstanding Directorial Achievement in Comedy Series	Nominated	

=== Producers Guild of America Awards ===
The Producers Guild of America Awards were originally established in 1990 by the Producers Guild of America (PGA) as the Golden Laurel Awards, created by PGA Treasurer Joel Freeman with the support of Guild President Leonard Stern, in order to honor the visionaries who produce and execute motion picture and television product.

Year	Nominated work	Category	Result	Ref.
2025	True Detective: Night Country	Best Limited Series Television	Nominated	

== Miscellaneous awards ==
=== AARP's Movies for Grownup Awards ===
AARP (American Association of Retired Persons) is a United States–based interest group whose stated mission is "to empower people to choose how they live as they age." Foster has won three awards from five nominations.

Year	Nominated work	Category	Result
2012	The Beaver	Best Grownup Love Story	Nominated
2021	The Mauritanian	Best Supporting Actress	Won
2024	Nyad	Best Supporting Actress	Won
2025	True Detective: Night Country	Best Actress (TV/Streaming)	Won
2026	A Private Life	Best Actress	Nominated

=== Alliance of Women Film Journalists Awards ===
The Alliance of Women Film Journalists (AWFJ) is a non-profit founded in 2006 based out of New York City, United States, dedicated to supporting work by and about women in the film industry

Year	Nominated work	Category	Result
2007	The Brave One	Bravest Performance Award	Nominated
2007	—N/a	Women Image Award	Won
2024	Nyad	Best Supporting Actress	Nominated
2024	Nyad	Grand Dame for Defying Ageism	Nominated

=== American Cinematheque Award ===
The American Cinematheque Award annually honors "an extraordinary artist in the entertainment industry who is fully engaged in his or her work and is committed to making a significant contribution to the art of the motion pictures".

Year	Nominated work	Category	Result
1999	—N/a	American Cinematheque Award	Honored

=== American Comedy Awards ===
The American Comedy Awards are a group of awards established in 1987 and presented annually in the United States recognizing performances and performers in the field of comedy, with an emphasis on television comedy and comedy films.

Year	Nominated work	Category	Result
1994	Maverick	Funniest Leading Actress in a Motion Picture	Nominated

=== American Film Institute ===
The American Film Institute is a private not-for-profit graduate film school in the Hollywood Hills district of Los Angeles. Students (called "Fellows") learn from the masters in a collaborative, hands-on production environment with an emphasis on storytelling. The Conservatory is a program of the American Film Institute founded in 1969. In 2018, Foster was honoured with the conservatory's honorary degree for her career achievements.

Year	Nominated work	Category	Result
2018	—N/a	AFI Conservatory's Honorary Degree	Honored

=== American Society of Cinematographers ===
American Society of Cinematographers is a cultural, educational, and professional organisation that is nor a labour union or a guild. The society was founded in Hollywood in 1919 and was organised with a purpose to not only progress and advance the science and art of cinematography, but also gather a wide range of cinematographers together to collaboratively discuss and exchange techniques, ideas and advocate motion pictures as a type of art form.

Year	Nominated work	Category	Result
1996	—N/a	Board of Directors Award	Honored

=== Athena Film Festival ===
The Athena Film Festival is an annual film festival held at Barnard College of Columbia University in New York City. The festival takes place in February and focuses on films celebrating women and leadership. In addition to showing films, the festival hosts filmmaker workshops, master classes and panels on a variety of topics relevant to women in the film industry.

Year	Nominated work	Category	Result
2015	—N/a	Laura Ziskin Lifetime Achievement Award	Honored

=== Astra TV Awards ===
The Astra TV Awards are presented by the Hollywood Creative Alliance honoring best in television Foster has been nominated twice.

Year	Nominated work	Category	Result
2024	True Detective: Night Country	Best Limited Series (Note: nominated as producer)	Nominated
2024	True Detective: Night Country	Best Actress in a Limited Series or TV Movie	Nominated

=== Berlin International Film Festival ===
The Berlin International Film Festival (German: Internationale Filmfestspiele Berlin), usually called the Berlinale, is a film festival held annually in Berlin, Germany. Founded in West Berlin in 1951, the festival has been held every February since 1978.

Year	Nominated work	Category	Result	Notes
1996	—N/a	Berlinale Camera	Honored	

=== Boston Film Festival ===
Boston Film Festival is an annual film festival held in Boston in the U.S. state of Massachusetts. It has been held annually since 1984, usually in early September. Foster was the inaugural recipient of the festival's honorary award for film excellence as well as the youngest recipient, receiving the honor at age 28.

Year	Nominated work	Category	Result
1991	—N/a	Film Excellence Award	Honored

=== Boston Society of Film Critics ===
The Boston Society of Film Critics (BSFC) is an organization of film reviewers from Boston, Massachusetts in the United States. The BSFC was formed in 1981 to make “Boston’s unique critical perspective heard on a national and international level by awarding commendations to the best of the year’s films and filmmakers and local film theaters and film societies that offer outstanding film programming”. Foster has won the award from the organisation once and has been a runner-up thrice.

Year	Nominated work	Category	Result
1988	The Accused	Best Actress	Runner-up
1991	The Silence of the Lambs	Best Actress	Runner-up
1994	Nell	Best Actress	Runner-up
2011	Carnage	Best Cast	Won

=== Blockbuster Entertainment Awards ===
The Blockbuster Entertainment Awards was a film awards ceremony, founded by Blockbuster Entertainment Inc., that ran from 1995 until 2001. The awards were produced by Ken Ehrlich every year.

Year	Nominated work	Category	Result
1998	Contact	Favorite Actress – Drama	Nominated
1999	Anna and the King	Favorite Actress – Romance	Nominated

=== Bravo Otto Awards ===
The Bravo Otto is a German accolade honoring excellence of performers in film, television and music. Established in 1957, the award is presented annually, with winners selected by the readers of Bravo magazine. Foster has received one award.

Year	Nominated work	Category	Result
1991	The Silence Of The Lambs	Best Actress	Won

=== Cable ACE Awards ===
Year	Nominated work	Category	Result
1994	All About Bette	Best Informational or Documentary Host	Nominated

=== Cannes Film Festival ===
The Cannes Film Festival (/kæn/; French: Festival de Cannes), is an annual film festival held in Cannes, France, which previews new films of all genres, including documentaries, from all around the world. Founded in 1946, the invitation-only festival is held annually (usually in May) at the Palais des Festivals et des Congrès.

Year	Nominated work	Category	Result	Notes
2021	—N/a	Honorary Palme d'Or	Honored	

=== Chicago Film Critics Association ===
The Chicago Film Critics Association (CFCA) is an association of professional film critics, who work in print, broadcast and online media, based in Chicago, Illinois, United States. The organization was founded in 1990 by film critics Sharon LeMaire and Sue Kiner, following the success of the first Chicago Film Critics Awards given out in 1988. The association compromises 60 members. Foster has received the award from the association once from four nominations.

Year	Nominated work	Category	Result
1988	The Accused	Best Actress	Nominated
1991	The Silence of the Lambs	Best Actress	Won
1994	Nell	Best Actress	Nominated
1997	Contact	Best Actress	Nominated
2023	Nyad	Best Supporting Actress	Nominated

=== Chicago International Film Festival ===
The Chicago International Film Festival is an annual film festival held every fall. Founded in 1964 by Michael Kutza, it is the longest-running competitive film festival in North America. At the age of 32, Foster became the youngest recipient of the festival's lifetime achievement award.

Year	Nominated work	Category	Result
1996	—N/a	Lifetime Achievement Award	Honored

=== Columbus Film Critics Association ===
Year	Nominated work	Category	Result
2023	Nyad	Best Supporting Performance	Won

=== Critics' Choice Awards ===
The Critics' Choice Awards (formerly known as the Broadcast Film Critics Association Award) is an awards show presented annually by the American-Canadian Critics Choice Association (CCA) to honor the finest in cinematic and television achievement. Written ballots are submitted during a week-long nominating period, and the resulting nominees are announced in December. The winners chosen by subsequent voting are revealed at the annual Critics' Choice Movie Awards ceremony in January. Additionally, special awards are given out at the discretion of the BFCA Board of Directors. Foster has been nominated twice.

Year	Nominated work	Category	Result
2024	Nyad	Best Supporting Actress	Nominated
2025	True Detective: Night Country	Best Actress in a Movie/Miniseries	Nominated

=== Critics' Choice Super Awards ===
The Critics' Choice Super Awards honor the best in genre fiction film and television, including Superhero, Science Fiction/Fantasy, Horror and Action,. Written ballots are submitted during a week-long nominating period, and the resulting nominees are announced in December. The winners chosen by subsequent voting are revealed at the annual Critics' Choice Movie Awards ceremony in January. Additionally, special awards are given out at the discretion of the BFCA Board of Directors. Foster has been nominated twice.

Year	Nominated work	Category	Result
2025	True Detective: Night Country	Best Actress in a Horror Series, Limited Series or Made-for-TV Movie	Won

=== Dallas–Fort Worth Film Critics Association ===
The Dallas–Fort Worth Film Critics Association is an organization of 31 print, radio/TV and internet journalists from Dallas–Fort Worth metroplex–based publications. Foster has won two awards from the organisation.

Year	Nominated work	Category	Result
1991	The Silence of the Lambs	Best Actress	Won
1994	Nell	Best Actress	Won
2023	Nyad	Best Supporting Actress	Runner-up

=== David di Donatello Awards ===
The David di Donatello (Italian: Ente David di Donatello), named after Donatello's David, is a film award presented each year for cinematic performances and production by L'accademia del Cinema Italiano (ACI) (transl. The Academy of Italian Cinema). There are 24 categories as of 2006. Italy is also famed for its annual Venice Film Festival. Foster has won four David, with three wins for Best Foreign Actress, she is the most awarded woman in the category.

Year	Nominated work	Category	Result	Notes
1976	Taxi Driver	Special David Award	Won	
1988	The Accused	Best Foreign Actress	Won	
1991	The Silence Of the Lambs	Best Foreign Actress	Won	
1994	Nell	Best Foreign Actress	Won	

=== Detroit Film Critics Society ===
The Detroit Film Critics Society is a film critic organization based in Detroit, Michigan, United States. It was founded in 2007 and comprises a group of over twenty film critics. Foster has received one award.

Year	Nominated work	Category	Result
2011	Carnage	Best Ensemble	Won

=== Dorian Awards ===
The Dorian Awards are an annual endeavor organized by GALECA: The Society of LGBTQ Entertainment Critics (founded in 2009 as the Gay and Lesbian Entertainment Critics Association). Foster has received one nomination.

Year	Nominated work	Category	Result
2015	Orange is the New Black	TV Director of the Year	Nominated
2024	—	Timeless Star Award "Honoring an exemplary career marked by character, wisdom and wit"	Won

=== Elle Women in Hollywood Awards ===
The Elle Women in Hollywood Awards are an annual award ceremony presented by Elle, honoring women from different fields of entertainment industry for their contributions.

Year	Nominated work	Category	Result
1994	—N/a	Icon Award	Honored

=== European Film Awards ===
The European Film Awards have been presented annually since 1988 by the European Film Academy to recognize excellence in European cinematic achievements. The awards are given in over ten categories, of which the most important is the Best Film. They are restricted to European cinema and European producers, directors, and actors. Foster has received one award

Year	Nominated work	Category	Result
1997	Contact	Jameson People's Choice Award for Best Actress	Won

=== Fangoria Chainsaw Awards ===
The Fangoria Chainsaw Awards are an award ceremony that goes out to horror films and thriller films. Beginning in 1992 the awards were expanded and an annual ceremony was inaugurated to give out the awards. Foster has received one award.

Year	Nominated work	Category	Result
1991	The Silence Of The Lambs	Best Actress	Won

=== George Eastman Award ===
The George Eastman Award for distinguished contribution to the art of film was established by the George Eastman Museum in 1955 as the first film award given by an American archive and museum to honor artistic work of enduring value.

Year	Nominated work	Category	Result	Reference
2023	—N/a	George Eastman Award	Honoured	

=== Globes de Cristal Awards ===
The Globes de Cristal Awards is a set of awards bestowed by members of the French Press Association recognizing excellence in home art and culture. The annual formal ceremony and dinner at which the awards are presented happens each February. Foster has been nominated once.

Year	Nominated work	Category	Result
2016	Money Monster	Best Foreign Film	Nominated

=== Golden Apple Award ===
The Golden Apple Award was an American award presented to entertainers by the Hollywood Women's Press Club, usually in recognition not of performance, but of behavior. The award was presented from 1941 until 2001, when the Hollywood Women's Press Club became inactive. The awards ceremony included Golden Apples to recognize actors for being easy to work with.

Year	Nominated work	Category	Result
1991	—N/a	Golden Apple Award	Won

=== Goldene Kamera Awards ===
The Goldene Kamera is an annual German film and television award, awarded by the Funke Mediengruppe. The gold-plated silver award model was created by Berlin artist Wolfram Beck. It is 25 centimeters (approximately 10 inches) high and weighs around 900 grams. Foster has received one award.

Year	Nominated work	Category	Result
1994	Nell	Best International Actress	Won

=== Hamburg International Film Festival ===
Filmfest Hamburg is an international film festival, the third-largest of its kind in Germany (after Berlin and Munich). It shows national and international feature and documentary films in eleven sections. The range of the program stretches from art house films to innovative mainstream cinema, presenting the first feature films of young unknown directors together with films by internationally established directors.

Year	Nominated work	Category	Result
1997	—N/a	Douglas Sirk Award	Honored

=== Hasty Pudding Theatricals ===
The Hasty Pudding Woman of the Year award is bestowed annually by the Hasty Pudding Theatricals society at Harvard University. Created in 1951, it has since been awarded annually by the society members of the Hasty Pudding to performers deemed to have made a "lasting and impressive contribution to the world of entertainment."

Year	Nominated work	Category	Result
1992	—N/a	Woman of the Year	Honored

=== Hollywood Film Awards ===
The Hollywood Film Awards are an American motion picture award ceremony held annually since 1997, usually in October or November. The gala ceremony takes place at the Beverly Hilton Hotel in Beverly Hills, California.

Year	Nominated work	Category	Result
2002	—N/a	Career Achievement Award	Honored

=== Irish Film & Television Academy Awards ===
The Irish Film & Television Academy (IFTA) is an all-Ireland organization focused on film and television. It has about 1000 members and is based in Dublin with branches in London and Los Angeles. Foster has been nominated once.

Year	Nominated work	Category	Result
2007	The Brave One	Best International Actress	Nominated

=== Jupiter Awards ===
The Jupiter Award is a German annual cinema award. It is Germany's biggest audience award for cinema and TV and is awarded annually by Cinema magazine and TV Spielfilm in eleven categories. Foster has won four awards from seven nominations.

Year	Nominated work	Category	Result
1990	The Accused	Best International Actress	Nominated
1991	The Silence of the Lambs	Best International Actress	Won
1992	Little Man Tate	Best International Actress	Won
1997	Contact	Best International Actress	Won
2005	Flightplan	Best International Actress	Nominated
2007	The Brave One	Best International Actress	Won
2011	Carnage	Best International Actress	Nominated

=== Independent Spirit Awards ===
The Independent Spirit Awards, founded in 1986, are awards dedicated to independent filmmakers. Winners are typically presented with acrylic glass pyramids containing suspended shoestrings representing the paltry budgets of independent films. Foster has received one award.

Year	Nominated work	Category	Result
1988	Five Corners	Best Female Lead	Won

=== Kansas City Film Critics Circle ===
The Kansas City Film Critics Circle (KCFCC) is a group of media film critics in the Kansas City metropolitan area. James Loutzenhiser, a local psychiatrist and film buff, who died in November 2001, founded the group in 1967. The annual film awards are now called "The Loutzenhiser Awards".

Year	Nominated work	Category	Result
1976	Taxi Driver	Best Supporting Actress	Won
1988	The Accused	Best Actress	Won
1991	The Silence of the Lambs	Best Actress	Won

=== Las Vegas Film Critics Society ===
Year	Nominated work	Category	Result
2023	Nyad	Best Supporting Actress	Nominated

=== Los Angeles Film Critics Association ===
The Los Angeles Film Critics Association (LAFCA) is an American film critic organization founded in 1975. Its membership comprises film critics from Los Angeles–based print and electronic media. Foster has received the award from the association once and has been the runner-up four times.

Year	Nominated work	Category	Result
1976	Taxi Driver	New Generation Award	Won
1988	The Accused	Best Actress	Runner-up
1991	The Silence of the Lambs	Best Actress	Runner-up
1994	Nell	Best Actress	Runner-up
1997	Contact	Best Actress	Runner-up

=== London Film Critics Circle ===
The London Film Critics' Circle is the name by which the Film Section of The Critics' Circle is known internationally. Founded in 1913, it is an association for working British critics. Foster has been nominated once.

Year	Nominated work	Category	Result
1991	The Silence Of The Lambs	Actress of the Year	Nominated

=== Lumière Awards ===
The Lumière Awards (French: Prix Lumières), officially the Lumières de la presse internationale, are French film awards presented by the Académie des Lumières to honor the best in the French-speaking cinema of the previous year. The awards ceremony is organized by the Académie des Lumières which consists of over 200 representatives of the international press based in Paris. Today they are regarded as one of the most prestigious French film industry awards, and are considered France's equivalent to the Golden Globe Awards. Foster has been nominated once.

Year	Nominated work	Category	Result
2026	A Private Life	Best Actress	Nominated

=== MTV Movie Awards ===
The MTV Movie Awards is a film awards show presented annually on MTV. The nominees are decided by producers and executives at MTV. Winners are decided online by the general public. Foster has been nominated once.

Year	Nominated work	Category	Result
1995	Nell	Best Female Performance	Nominated

=== Morelia International Film Festival ===
Year	Nominated work	Category	Result
2023	—N/a	Artistic Excellence Award	Honored

=== National Board of Review ===
The National Board of Review of Motion Pictures is an organization in the United States dedicated to discussing and selecting what its members regard as the best film works of each year. Foster has received one award.

Year	Nominated work	Category	Result
1988	The Accused	Best Actress	Won

=== National Society of Film Critics ===
The National Society of Film Critics (NSFC) is an American film critic organization. The organization is known for its highbrow tastes, and its annual awards are one of the most prestigious film critics awards in the United States. Foster is awarded once by the society and has been a runner-up thrice.

Year	Nominated work	Category	Result
1976	Taxi Driver	Best Supporting Actress	Won
1988	The Accused	Best Actress	Runner-up
1991	The Silence of the Lambs	Best Actress	Runner-up
1994	Nell	Best Actress	Runner-up

=== New York Film Critics Circle ===
The New York Film Critics Circle (NYFCC) is an American film critic organization founded in 1935 by Wanda Hale from the New York Daily News. Its membership includes over 30 film critics from New York–based daily and weekly newspapers, magazines, online publications. Foster is awarded once by the organisation and has been a runner-up thrice.

Year	Nominated work	Category	Result
1976	Taxi Driver	Best Supporting Actress	Runner-up
1988	The Accused	Best Actress	Runner-up
1991	The Silence of the Lambs	Best Actress	Won
1994	Nell	Best Actress	Runner-up

=== New York Women in Film and Television ===
New York Women in Film & Television (NYWIFT) is a nonprofit membership organization for professional women in film, television and digital media. A champion of women's rights, achievements and points of view in the film and television industry, NYWIFT is an educational forum for media professionals, and a network for the exchange of information and resources.

Year	Nominated work	Category	Result
1991	—N/a	Muse Award	Honored

=== Online Film & Television Association Awards ===
Year	Nominated work	Category	Result
1997	Contact	Best Actress	Nominated
1997	Contact	Best Actress: Sci-fi	Won
2014	Orange is the New Black	Best Direction- Comedy Series	Nominated
2015	—N/a	Hall of Fame	Honored

=== People's Choice Awards ===
The People's Choice Awards, is an American awards show, recognizing people in entertainment, voted online by the general public and fans. The show has been held annually since 1975. Foster has received the award once and has been nominated four times.

Year	Nominated work	Category	Result
1989	The Accused	Favorite Dramatic Motion Picture Actress	Nominated
1992	The Silence of the Lambs	Favorite Dramatic Motion Picture Actress	Nominated
1995	Nell	Favorite Dramatic Motion Picture Actress	Won
2008	—N/a	Favorite Female Action Star	Nominated

=== Rembrandt Awards ===
The Rembrandt Awards were a Dutch film award created in 1993. Foster received one award.

Year	Nominated work	Category	Result
1997	Contact	Best Actress	Won

=== San Diego Film Critics Society ===
The San Diego Film Critics Society (SDFCS) is an organization of film reviewers from San Diego–based publications. Foster has received two nominations.

Year	Nominated work	Category	Result
2011	Carnage	Best Performance by an Ensemble	Nominated
2023	Nyad	Best Supporting Actress	Nominated

=== San Francisco Bay Area Film Critics Circle ===
The San Francisco Bay Area Film Critics Circle (SFBAFCC), formerly known as San Francisco Film Critics Circle, was founded in 2002 as an organization of film journalists and critics from San Francisco, California–based publications. Foster has received one nomination.

Year	Nominated work	Category	Result
2023	Nyad	Best Supporting Actress	Nominated

=== Santa Barbara International Film Festival ===
The Santa Barbara International Film Festival (SBIFF) is an eleven-day film festival held in Santa Barbara, California since 1986. Foster has been awarded once by the festival.

Year	Nominated work	Category	Result
1997	—N/a	Maltin Modern Master Award	Honored

=== Satellite Awards ===
The Satellite Awards are annual awards given by the International Press Academy that are commonly noted in entertainment industry journals and blogs.

Year	Nominated work	Category	Result
1998	—N/a	Mary Pickford Award	Honored
2025	True Detective: Night Country	Best Actress – Miniseries or Television Film	Nominated

=== Saturn Awards ===
The Academy of Science Fiction, Fantasy and Horror Films (ASFFF) presents each year the Saturn Awards, which honor the top works in science fiction, fantasy, and horror in film, television and home video since 1972. Foster has been nominated for a leading five Best Actress awards and has won twice, more than anyone else.

Year	Nominated work	Category	Result
1978	The Little Girl Who Lives Down the Lane	Best Actress	Won
1992	The Silence of the Lambs	Best Actress	Nominated
1998	Contact	Best Actress	Won
2003	Panic Room	Best Actress	Nominated
2006	Flightplan	Best Actress	Nominated
2024	—N/a	The Life Career Award	Honoured
2025	True Detective: Night Country	Best Actress on Television	Nominated

=== Sant Jordi Awards ===
The Sant Jordi Awards (Catalan: Premis Sant Jordi de Cinematografia) are film prizes awarded annually in Barcelona by the Catalonia region of the Spanish radio network RNE. Foster has received one nomination.

Year	Nominated work	Category	Result
1991	The Silence Of The Lambs	Best Foreign Actress	Nominated

=== Southeastern Film Critics Association ===
Year	Nominated work	Category	Result
1994	Nell	Best Actress	Won

=== ShoWest Convention ===
ShoWest Convention was formerly one of four major worldwide annual events owned by the Film Group unit of Nielsen Business Media before being sold in 2011 to e5 Global Media and operated exclusively by NATO. Now known as CinemaCon it is presented by the National Association of Theatre Owners.

Year	Nominated work	Category	Result
1992	—N/a	Female Star Of The Year	Won

=== Sitges - Catalonian International Film Festival ===
The Sitges Film Festival (Catalan: Festival Internacional de Cinema Fantàstic de Catalunya) is a Spanish film festival and one of the world's foremost international festivals specializing in fantasy and horror films. Established in 1968, the festival normally takes place every year in early October in the coastal resort of Sitges, 34 kilometers West-South-West of the city of Barcelona, Catalonia (Spain).

Year	Nominated work	Category	Result
2005	—N/a	Honorary Grand Prize	Honored

=== St. Louis Gateway Film Critics Association ===
The St. Louis Film Critics Association (SLFCA) is an organization of film critics operating in Greater St. Louis and adjoining areas of Missouri and Illinois which was founded in 2004. Foster has been nominated once.

Year	Nominated work	Category	Result
2007	The Brave One	Best Actress	Nominated

=== TIFF Tribute Awards ===
The TIFF Tribute Awards are an annual award, presented by the Toronto International Film Festival to honour distinguished achievements in filmmaking. Unlike the festival's regular awards, which are presented based on audience or jury voting during the festival, the TIFF Tribute Awards are presented to people or organizations selected by the board and announced in advance of the festival. Recipients are selected from among the cast and crew of the films in that year's festival lineup.

Year	Nominated work	Category	Result
2025	—N/a	Share Her Journey Groundbreaker Award	Honoured

=== Television Critics Association Awards ===
The TCA Awards are awards presented by the Television Critics Association in recognition of excellence in television. There are eleven categories, which are presented every summer towards the end of the organization's summer press tour. Foster has been nominated once.

Year	Nominated work	Category	Result
2024	True Detective: Night Country	Individual Achievement in Drama	Nominated

=== Telluride Film Festival ===
The Telluride Film Festival is a film festival which was established in 1974 and is held annually in Telluride, Colorado during Labor Day weekend.

Year	Nominated work	Category	Result
1991	—N/a	Silver Medallion	Honored

=== T.V. Land Awards ===
Year	Nominated work	Category	Result
1997	The X Files	Favourite Cameo Appearance	Nominated

=== Washington D.C. Area Film Critics Association ===
The Washington D.C. Area Film Critics Association (WAFCA) is a group of film critics based in Washington, D.C., and founded in 2002. WAFCA is composed of nearly 50 D.C.-based film critics from internet, print, radio, and television. Annually, the group gives awards to the best in film as selected by its members by vote. Foster has been nominated once

Year	Nominated work	Category	Result
2023	Nyad	Best Supporting Actress	Nominated

=== Women Film Critics Circle ===
The Women Film Critics Circle is a film critics and scholars association in the United States. Found in 2004, WFCC was the first all-women group of this type in that country. WFCC has 75 members from the United States and foreign countries who are involved in print, radio, television and online media.

Year	Nominated work	Category	Result
2023	Nyad	Best Supporting Actress	Nominated
2023	Nyad	Best Screen Couple	Won

=== Women in Film Crystal + Lucy Awards ===
The Women in Film Crystal + Lucy Awards were first presented in 1977 by the now–Los Angeles chapter of the Women in Film organization—are presented to honor women in communications and media. The Crystal Award honors outstanding women who, through their endurance and the excellence of their work, have helped to expand the role of women within the entertainment industry.

Year	Nominated work	Category	Result
1996	—N/a	Crystal Award	Honored

=== Women's Image Network Awards ===
Women's Image Network (WIN), was founded in 1993 to promote gender parity by filmmaker Phyllis Stuart. This company became successful from the ongoing support, advice and assistance provided by seasoned entertainment professionals including Sherry Lansing and Arthur Hiller, just two of the illustrious WIN founding advisory board members. Foster has received one nomination.

Year	Nominated work	Category	Result
2005	Flightplan	Actress Of the Year	Nominated

=== Young Artist Awards ===
The Young Artist Awards (originally known as the Youth In Film Award) is an accolade bestowed by the Young Artist Association, a non-profit organization founded in 1978 to honor excellence of youth performers, and to provide scholarships for young artists who may be physically and/or financially challenged. Foster has received one nomination.

Year	Nominated work	Category	Result
1980	Foxes	Best Young Actress in a Major Motion Picture	Nominated

=== 20/20 Awards ===
Year	Nominated work	Category	Result
1991	The Silence Of The Lambs	Best Actress	Won
1994	Nell	Best Actress	Nominated

=== Hollywood Walk of Fame ===
Walk of Fame
Year	Nominated work	Category	Result	Ref.
2016	—N/a	Hollywood Walk of Fame Star (Motion Picture Category)	Honoured	

=== Legion of Honour ===
Legion of Honour
Year	Nominated work	Category	Result	Ref.
2026	—N/a	Chevalier	Honoured	

== See also ==
- Jodie Foster filmography
