= Cassisi =

Cassisi is an Italian surname. Notable people with the surname include:

- Domenic Cassisi (born 1982), Australian rules footballer
- John Cassisi (born 1962), American child actor
