= Bugsy Malone =

1976 gangster musical comedy film

- U.S. theatrical release poster by Charles Moll
- Directed by: Alan Parker
- Written by: Alan Parker
- Produced by: Alan Marshall
- Starring: Jodie Foster; Scott Baio; John Cassisi
- Cinematography: Peter Biziou; Michael Seresin
- Edited by: Gerry Hambling
- Music by: Paul Williams
- Production companies: Goodtimes Enterprises; Robert Stigwood Organisation
- Distributed by: The Rank Organisation; Fox-Rank Distributors; Paramount Pictures (United States)
- Release date: July 23, 1976 (London)
- Running time: 93 minutes
- Countries: United States; United Kingdom
- Languages: English; Italian
- Budget: £574,953-£1 million
- Box office: £1,373,964

Bugsy Malone is a 1976 gangster musical comedy film written and directed by Alan Parker (in his feature film directorial debut). A co-production of the United States and United Kingdom, it features an ensemble cast, comprising only child and teenage actors playing adult roles, with Jodie Foster, Scott Baio, and John Cassisi in major roles. The film tells the story of the rise of "Bugsy Malone" and the battle for power between "Fat Sam" and "Dandy Dan".

Set in New York City, it is a gangster movie spoof, with machine guns that fire gobs of whipped cream instead of bullets. The film is based loosely on events in New York and Chicago during Prohibition era, specifically the exploits of real-life gangsters such as Al Capone and Bugs Moran. Parker lightened the subject matter considerably for the children's market and the film received a G rating in the U.S. Bugsy Malone premiered at the 1976 Cannes Film Festival, where it competed for the Palme d'Or. It was theatrically released in the United Kingdom on July 23, 1976, by Fox-Rank Distributors, and in the United States by Paramount Pictures on September 15. Although a commercial success in the UK, it was not a financial success overseas. The film received critical acclaim, with praise drawn for Parker's screenplay and direction, its musical numbers, unique narrative and the performances of the cast.

The film received eight nominations at the 30th British Academy Film Awards, including Best Film, and won three: Best Supporting Actress and Most Promising Newcomer to Leading Film Roles for Foster and Best Screenplay for Parker. The film also received three nominations at the 34th Golden Globe Awards including Best Motion Picture – Musical or Comedy.

In 2008, Empire ranked it 353rd on their list of 500 greatest movies of all time.

== Plot ==
During the prohibition era, a mobster named Roxy Robinson is "splurged" by members of a rival gang, using rapid-fire cream-shooting "splurge guns". Once splurged, a gangster is "all washed up... finished". Mob boss Fat Sam Staccetto introduces himself in the opening narration, as well as introducing Bugsy Malone, a penniless boxing promoter who is "a little too popular with the broads... but a nice guy" ("Bugsy Malone").

At Fat Sam's speakeasy, the Grand Slam, there is much dancing and singing ("Fat Sam's Grand Slam"). Fat Sam rants about the loss of Roxy, who was one of his best men, laying the blame on up-and-coming rival mob boss Dandy Dan and worried that Dan is trying to take control of his criminal empire. Blousey Brown, an aspiring singer and actress, has come for an audition at the speakeasy, but Sam is too distracted to see her. Bugsy meets Blousey when he trips over her luggage; he is instantly smitten and attempts to flirt with her. Just then, Fat Sam's is raided by Dandy Dan's men, who shoot up the place. Over the next few weeks, Dan's men continue to attack Fat Sam's empire, eventually taking over all of Sam's money-making rackets (including the sarsaparilla racket and lettuce racket) and splurging members of Fat Sam's gang until only the speakeasy remains. Sam finds his gang fooling around ("Bad Guys") and then sends all his available men except his personal enforcer Knuckles, to see if they can track down the guns but they are ambushed at a laundry and splurged by Dandy Dan's gang.

Bugsy returns to Fat Sam's to arrange a new audition for Blousey. Fat Sam's girlfriend, the chanteuse Tallulah, makes a pass at him and, although Bugsy rejects her flirtation, Tallulah plants a big kiss on Bugsy's forehead just as Blousey enters. Blousey is jealous but performs anyway, using her personal feelings to boost her performance ("I'm Feelin' Fine"). Fat Sam hires Blousey after her audition and she leaves quickly, refusing to speak to Bugsy.

Sam hires Bugsy as a driver to accompany him to a truce meeting with Dandy Dan. He also takes along "Looney" Bergonzi, a top Chicago mob enforcer. The meeting is a trap, but Bugsy helps Fat Sam escape and is paid $200 by a grateful Sam. Bugsy and Blousey reconcile and have a romantic outing on a lake, where Bugsy promises to take her to Hollywood. When he returns Sam's car to the garage he is attacked and his money is stolen. Bugsy is saved by Leroy Smith, who assaults the attackers and drives them away. Bugsy realizes that Leroy has the potential to be a great boxer and introduces him to boxing coach Cagey Joe ("So You Wanna Be a Boxer?"). Fat Sam seeks Bugsy's aid again after Knuckles is accidentally killed by a malfunctioning splurge gun knockoff. Bugsy resists, but Fat Sam offers him $400, enough money to keep his promise to Blousey, although she is disappointed when she learns that Bugsy hasn't bought the tickets to California yet ("Ordinary Fool"). Bugsy and Leroy follow Dandy Dan's men to a warehouse where the guns are being stashed. They realize the two of them can't take the place alone, so Bugsy recruits a large group of down-and-out workers at a soup kitchen ("Down and Out"). They successfully raid the warehouse and take the crates of guns.

Taking refuge at the Grand Slam, Bugsy and his army disguise themselves as waiters and patrons. Upon the arrival of Dan and his men, a massive splurge gun fight erupts, with unarmed patrons throwing cream pies. Everyone in the speakeasy, except Bugsy and Blousey, gets covered in splurge, but somehow no one gets "finished" this time. Razzmatazz, the speakeasy's piano player, is hit from behind and falls onto the keys, striking a single bass chord which silences the room. Razzmatazz begins playing again ("Bad Guys Reprise"), which rouses the spluge-covered crowd. Everyone then begins to laugh and realize they can all be friends, joining together in song ("You Give a Little Love") as Bugsy and Blousey leave for Hollywood in Fat Sam's car.

== Cast ==
- Scott Baio as Bugsy Malone, an Italian-Irish ex-boxer/boxing scout
- Florrie Dugger as Blousey Brown, a sassy young dame interested in Hollywood
- Jodie Foster as Tallulah, Fat Sam's gun moll, the speakeasy's chanteuse and Bugsy's old flame
- John Cassisi as Fat Sam Staccetto, crime boss. He is dubbed by the press as "The Alleged Mobster King of the Lower East Side".
- Martin Lev as Dandy Dan, rival gang boss who steals Fat Sam's territory
- Paul Murphy as Leroy Smith, an African-American tramp who discovers he has a talent for boxing
- Sheridan Earl Russell as Knuckles, Fat Sam's main hoodlum who constantly cracks his knuckles
- Albin "Humpty" Jenkins as Fizzy, caretaker at Fat Sam's Grand Slam, tap dancer
- Paul Chirelstein as Smolsky, dim-witted police captain
- Andrew Paul as O'Dreary, dumb policeman
- Jeffrey Stevens as Louis, one of Fat Sam's hoodlums
- Donald Waugh as Snake Eyes, one of Fat Sam's hoodlums
- Peter Holder as Ritzy, one of Fat Sam's hoodlums
- Michael Kirkby as Angelo, one of Fat Sam's hoodlums
- Dexter Fletcher as Baby Face, down and out
- Davidson Knight as Cagey Joe, the boxing gym owner
- Dov Prehn as Boy dancing, in crowd and at the Grand Slam Speakeasy Final fight
- John Williams as Roxy Robinson, Fat Sam's best bodyguard, splurged by Dandy Dan's gang
- Bonita Langford as Lena Marelli, showy, pompous theatre performer
- Mark Curry as Oscar DeVelt, stuck-up theatre producer
- Jonathan Scott-Taylor as News Reporter
- Sarah E. Joyce as Smokey Priscilla, showgirl, member of Tallulah's Troupe
- Helen Corran as Bangles, showgirl, member of Tallulah's Troupe
- Kathy Spaulding as Loretta, showgirl, member of Tallulah's Troupe
- Sharon Noonan as Coco, showgirl, member of Tallulah's Troupe
- Vivienne McKone as Velma, showgirl, member of Tallulah's Troupe
- Lynn Aulbaugh as Louella, Dandy Dan's wife and polo partner
- Michael Jackson as Razamataz, Fat Sam's personal pianist and performer at the Grand Slam Speakeasy
- Louise English as Ballerina Mel

== Production ==
Bugsy Malone was Alan Parker's first feature film. Parker was trying to find a film project that was not "parochial" and decided upon an American gangster setting: "I had four young children and we used to go to a cottage in Derbyshire at weekends. On the long, boring car journey up there, I started telling them the story of a gangster called Bugsy Malone. They’d ask me questions and I’d make up answers, based on my memories of watching old movie reruns as a kid." His eldest son suggested children should be cast as the "heroes".

Alan Marshall, who was a producer and partner on several TV commercials with Parker, encouraged him to do the script. David Puttnam, who had served as producer on Parker's first script in Melody (1971), served as executive producer, helping to secure a deal with £1 million of funding that came from Rank Organisation and the National Film Finance Corporation, with the provision that a United States distributor was found. Richard Sylbert, the art director-turned-executive at Paramount Pictures was approached with Parker's visual presentation of the material and agreed to help distribute the film.

=== Casting ===
The director chose to cast several unknown actors in the film. To find his Fat Sam, Parker visited a Brooklyn classroom, asking for "the naughtiest boy in class". The students were unanimous in selecting John Cassisi, and Parker gave him the role. Florrie Dugger (Blousey) originally was cast in a smaller role; when the actress cast as Blousey suddenly grew taller than Baio, Dugger was promoted. She had been "discovered" at RAF Chicksands, an air force base in Bedfordshire where her American father was stationed. At the time of filming, all of the cast were under 17 years old.

Parker cast Baio after he slammed down the script and stormed out of his audition. Baio later remembered:

I had quit the business, because I didn’t like driving into Manhattan. Well, the long and the short of it is that I wanted to play with my friends after school, but it happened to be raining that day, so I went to the city to meet with Alan Parker. I read it, but I just barely read it. I didn’t even want to be there. He was English, but I didn’t even know what that was. He was just this weird guy with long hair, and I didn’t know what he was. [Laughs.] So I sort of read the script, threw it at him, and walked out the door. That was it: I’d gotten the part before I got home.

In Los Angeles, Parker met a 12-year-old Jodie Foster, who at the time was about to start the filming of Martin Scorsese's Taxi Driver. About casting Foster as Tallulah and working with her, Parker said:

I sat on my own, suitcase at my side, in the shabby screening room with its threadbare carpets replete with Darryl F. Zanuck's cigar burns in the mouldy leather armchairs that smelled of fish. The film was Echoes of a Summer, and the young actress in question was Jodie Foster. I subsequently met with Jodie in my publicist's office. Affable and articulate, the twelve-year-old Jodie was wise beyond her years. Jodie was impeccable and extremely "set savvy". I think she directed me as much as I directed her. She was extremely knowledgeable of the filmmaking process—she could have complicated technical conversations with the camera crew and script supervisor that were beyond her years. Even then, when she was twelve, I joked that if I got sick, she could take over.

=== Music ===
Parker chose Paul Williams to score the film in order to get a more "palatable" modern sound, and simply because he liked him. Williams had scored Brian De Palma's commercial failure Phantom of the Paradise, but had also written huge pop-radio hits (such as "We've Only Just Begun" (lyrics), and "(Just An) Old Fashioned Love Song"). Williams would soon win an Oscar for his song "Evergreen" from the film A Star Is Born (1976).

Williams felt that "... the challenge for me was to provide songs that reflected the period ... and yet maintained an energy that would hold the young audience's attention." According to Parker, Williams was writing while on tour, recording songs in different cities, and sending the completed tapes to Hollywood. Arriving during the first pre-shoot rehearsals, the songs had to be accepted and used as they were, with voices by Williams, Archie Hahn, and others.

Neither the director nor the songwriter were comfortable with the results. Williams later wrote "I'm really proud of the work and the only thing I've ever doubted is the choice of using adult voices. Perhaps, I should have given the kids a chance to sing the songs." Parker also commented: "Watching the film after all these years, this is one aspect that I find the most bizarre. Adult voices coming out of these kids' mouths? I had told Paul that I didn't want squeaky kids' voices and he interpreted this in his own way. Anyway, as the tapes arrived, scarcely weeks away from filming, we had no choice but to go along with it!"

The film soundtrack album was originally released as an LP in 1976. In March 1996, Polydor UK released the soundtrack on CD.

Performers include Paul Williams, Archie Hahn, Julie McWhirter, and Liberty Williams.

Track listing

1. "Bugsy Malone" – Paul Williams
2. "Fat Sam's Grand Slam" – Paul Williams
3. "Tomorrow"
4. "Bad Guys"
5. "I'm Feeling Fine"
6. "My Name Is Tallulah" – Louise "Liberty" Williams
7. "So You Wanna Be a Boxer?"
8. "Ordinary Fool"
9. "Down and Out"
10. "You Give a Little Love" – Paul Williams

=== Filming ===
The film was rehearsed and shot in the United Kingdom, largely on Pinewood Studios' "H" stage, with locations in Black Park Country Park (Wexham, Buckinghamshire) and primarily the former Huntley & Palmers buildings in Reading, Berkshire.

The "splurge firearm" proved to be problematic. After initial experiments with cream-filled wax balls proved painful, Parker decided to abandon the idea of filming the firearms directly. Instead, the firearms fired ping-pong balls, and a fast cut to a victim being pelted with "splurge" was used to convey the impression of the rapid-firing firearms.

Baio later said making the film was "awesome":

A kid’s fantasy: You get to dress up as gangster, you get to shoot guns that fire whipped cream, you get to drive cars with pedals that look like real cars, and you get to talk like a grown-up. I mean, you couldn’t ask for a better first big gig. Talk about getting you hooked on a business! It was fantastic.

== Reception ==
=== Critical reception ===
On Rotten Tomatoes, Bugsy Malone holds a score of 79% based on 28 reviews, with an average rating of 6.50/10. The website's consensus reads, "Delightfully bizarre, Bugsy Malone harnesses immense charm from its cast of child actors playing wise guys with precocious pluck." Metacritic gave the film a score of 71 based on seven reviews, indicating "generally favorable" reviews.

==== British critics ====
Among British reviewers, Patrick Gibbs of The Daily Telegraph described the film as "entertainment of considerable originality and polish." Arthur Thirkell of the Daily Mirror applauded Foster's performance and called Bugsy Malone "one of the most delightfully professional films to hit the screen in the last decade." Alexander Walker of the Evening Standard called it "an impossible film to categorise—but a wholly fresh, inventive, enjoyable experience to view. It has taste, shape, melody, infinite affection for its period props—and a joyously spunky reading by the kids of its period stereotypes." Russell Davies of The Observer said that "the performance he has coaxed from Scott Baio in the title role is particularly remarkable; the lad catches a consistently honest, unflashy diffidence that is the very essence of that traditional figure in American mythology, the average guy. whom the ladies go for." David Castell of The Sunday Telegraph said that "all W.C. Fields-like prejudices are left outside this vast adventure playground in which the children conduct themselves with an earnestness and natural dignity that is a delight to watch. The only concession it has been necessary to make is the fairly unobtrusive dubbing in of adult singing voices." Madeleine Harmsworth of the Sunday Mirror wrote:

I approached the film BUGSY MALONE with misgivings. A musical send-up of a gangster movie with a cast of kids—average age twelve seemed like a good gimmick, but that's all. As it happens, writer-director Alan Parker's film is much more than a novelty. It's an inspiration! The dialogue is witty. The songs are snappy, and the pace never palls as gang fights gang with foam and custard pies. I wish this fun film the best of British luck.

Kenneth Baily of the Sunday People said that "some may fear that kids glamorised as speak-easy chorus girls and slicked-up as gangsters could turn out a sick joke. The splendid achievement of the film is its wholly good taste and enjoyable entertainment." Derek Malcolm of The Guardian gave the film a more mixed assessment, praising Williams' music, Parker's script and direction and the various performances, while noting that "there are times when the movie loses its way, when the invention sags and when the essential artificiality of the concept becomes apparent." A review from David Robinson in The Times read as follows:

If for nothing else you would have to admire Bugsy Malone for the sheer doggedness of its eccentricity. It is a nostalgic pastiche of all the cliches of the gangster movie and the musical of-the early days of sound films, the novelty being that it is entirely played by children of an average age of 12. Its rapturous reception by the public at the Cannes Festival in May shows that this kind of novelty appeals strongly to a large section of the audience, so I'd not like to make too much of my own feeling that a couple of reels would be more than enough of such a gag: after that you tend to pine for something more than the performances or the pastiche script or the joke of the cream-spattering machine guns have to offer. The writer-director was Alan Parker, who has come up through television commercials and a prizewinning television film, The Evacuees, and who clearly has a way with kid performers. The bright musical score is by the American Paul Williams. But if we're hoping for white hopes for the ailing British cinema, it would be more encouraging to find something with bigger ambitions than novelty and nostalgia.

==== American critics ====
Rex Reed gave the film an exuberantly positive review upon its debut in New York, less than two months later:

In the commercial cinema, Bugsy Malone (Baronet) has captured my heart. Written and directed by newcomer Alan Parker, it's bright, wholesome and as lively as anything I've seen in films in longer than I care to remember, and although it might seem too coy for most adult tastes, the kids love it and you can send them off to see it with no fear of brain damage. A delicious musical spoof of Forties' Warner Brothers gangster epics, entirely sung, danced and performed by children, Bugsy Malone has clever Paul Williams songs, high-kicking pubescent chorines, tommy-gun dialogue out of Damon Runyon, and the most precocious cast of mobster moppets ever assembled on a screen that shows their talents to be twice the size they are. The oldest is 13-year-old Jodie Foster (who turned 14 after the film's completion), the teenage hooker from Taxi Driver. The youngest is barely out of diapers. All are superb in their Godfather pin-stripes and their flapper fringe.

Roger Ebert gave the film three-and-a-half stars out of four and called it "a charming one" with "yet another special performance by Jodie Foster". Gene Siskel also gave the film three-and-a-half stars out of four and said that "what makes Bugsy Malone really worth watching—as opposed to being just a cute idea—are the fine performers, terrific choreography, catchy songs, and bright photography." Variety wrote that the film had "charm, neat acting by an all-youngster cast, a tongue-in-cheek script and dialog, lilting songs, and score", but that audiences may find it "a bit fragile over its hour-and-a-half duration, and its content and approach just that bit too clever." Vincent Canby of The New York Times wrote "The world that Alan Parker has created in 'Bugsy Malone' is very peculiar, but he is remarkably successful considering the terrible odds against such a stunt in the first place." Charles Champlin of the Los Angeles Times called it "a rare, original, tuneful, lighthearted, charming, and preposterously innocent family film". Gary Arnold of The Washington Post panned the film as "a freakish embarrassment" and an "icky misconception", though he singled out Jodie Foster for praise as an actress whose "precociousness is truly extraordinary". Pauline Kael of The New Yorker called the film "nothing but its godawful idea", writing "We're not watching actors in a story, we're watching kids doing a stunt, and so we're primed to ooh and aah, the way the audience does for a chimp on the Carson show." Kathleen Carroll of the New York Daily News praised the songs, script and performances in her three-star review, but believed the novelty wore thin after a while, and she was also critical of the song dubbing.

=== Box office ===
Bugsy Malone was not a commercial success in the U.S., bringing in just over $2.7 million. Paramount gave it a limited release, usually in second-tier theaters in a double-bill with The Bad News Bears, which had been out for six months and was no longer much of a draw. According to Parker, the film was "quite successful" in the United Kingdom. By 1985, it had earned an estimated profit of £1,854,000.

=== Accolades ===
The film garnered 15 award nominations, including "Best Motion Picture (Musical/Comedy)", "Best Original Score" and "Best Original Song" (for the title track) from the Golden Globes, and an Oscar for "Best Original Song Score" (Paul Williams). The film was in competition for the Palme d'Or at the 1976 Cannes Film Festival. Jodie Foster received two BAFTAs, "Best Supporting Actress" and "Most Promising Newcomer to Leading Film Roles", however, both her nominations were for her previous work in Taxi Driver, in addition to her work on Bugsy Malone. Alan Parker received the BAFTA Award for Best Screenplay, and a nomination for Best Direction. Geoffrey Kirkland won the BAFTA Award for Best Production Design. Additionally, Paul Williams received a nomination for the Anthony Asquith Award for Film Music, and Monica Howe a Best Costume Design nomination. The film received a Best Picture nomination.

=== American Film Institute ===
- Top 10 Gangster Films – Nominated

== Home media ==
In the early 1980s, Bugsy Malone was released on VHS. On 16 April 1996, it was re-released by Paramount on VHS. A region 2 DVD has been available since 2003 and although the film has never been released on Region 1 DVD, it has been available through Internet sites as an Asian import supporting Region 1 (US). On 9 September 2008, Arista/SME released a Blu-ray version, encoded for "all regions", as a United Kingdom import. This edition includes a director's commentary as well as other special features. A new 4K restoration was released as part of the Paramount Presents line on 31 August 2021.

== Legacy ==
In 2003, Bugsy Malone was voted #19 on a list of the 100 greatest musicals, as chosen by viewers of Channel 4 in the UK, placing it higher than The Phantom of the Opera, Cats, and The King and I. In 2005, Bugsy Malone was voted 39th on a list of the 100 greatest family films (also compiled by Channel 4) ahead of Beetlejuice and The Princess Bride and behind Bedknobs and Broomsticks and It's a Wonderful Life. Bugsy Malone ranks 353rd on Empire's 2008 list of the 500 greatest movies of all time.

A 2003 television documentary called Bugsy Malone: After They Were Famous features a reunion and interviews with Jodie Foster, Scott Baio, John Cassisi, and Florrie Dugger. The British actors who played Fat Sam's gang are also reunited at Pinewood Studios. The documentary reported that Dugger, who (unlike her co-stars) had never acted again, had chosen to pursue a career in the United States Air Force Medical Service.

In 2010, UK band Silvery included a cover of "You Give a Little Love" on their second album Railway Architecture, and Olly Murs, runner-up in the 2009 UK series of The X Factor, sampled "So You Wanna Be a Boxer" in his song "Hold On" that can be found on his debut album.

In 2011, the film was the most screened film in secondary schools in the United Kingdom.

In 2017, the song "You Give a Little Love" was sung by a children's chorus at the end of a Netflix Black Mirror episode (Season 4 Episode 3 "Crocodile").

Sometime in the 2000s, Coca-Cola Ltd. (Canada) made an animated ad using "You Give a Little Love" that was only screened in movie theaters before any trailers.

The song "Ordinary Fool" has been covered by numerous artists including Ella Fitzgerald and The Carpenters.

In 2024, Morrisons released their Christmas ad featuring oven gloves singing "You Give a Little love".

Filmink argued "the actors turned out like you can imagine their characters turning out – in real life, Bugsy became toxic MAGA, Fat Sam went to prison for paying bribes, Tallulah turned into an Oscar winning legend, top director and queer icon, Blousey joined the air force."

=== Comic book adaptation ===
Graham Thompson adapted the film into a 1976 comic book, which was only released in the United Kingdom.

== Stage adaptation ==
Parker wrote the book for a stage adaptation of Bugsy Malone, using Williams' music. This premiered in the West End in 1983 at Her Majesty's Theatre and ran for 300 performances. It was directed by Michael Dolenz and the cast featured Catherine Zeta-Jones as Tallulah. Unlike the film version, the young cast perform their own songs rather than being dubbed by adult voices. In 1997, the National Youth Music Theatre mounted an all-youth version at the Queen's Theatre, starring Sheridan Smith and Jamie Bell. Another revival played in 2015 and again in 2016 at the Lyric Hammersmith, where it was nominated for the Olivier Award for Best Musical Revival. The Lyric Hammersmith production toured the UK from July 2022, before a Christmas run at Alexandra Palace in London. A 60-minute version of the show, Bugsy Malone JR., was developed as an educational alternative to the original and is available for licensing through Music Theatre International.

The only cast recording of the stage show released to date is by the National Youth Music Theatre, released in 1998. This includes all the songs featured in the film and two new songs written by Williams: "That's Why They Call Him Dandy" and "Show Business". There is also some additional incidental orchestral score, such as an Overture and Exit Music, with music arranged by John Pearson. The recording features a young Sheridan Smith as Tallulah. As the film version dubbed the songs with adult voices, this is the only released version with the songs performed by children and young adults.

Track listing

1. "Overture"
2. "Bugsy Malone"
3. "Fat Sam's Grand Slam"
4. "That's Why They Call Him Dandy"
5. "Tomorrow"
6. "Show Business"
7. "Bad Guys"
8. "Double Chorus"
9. "You Give a Little Love (Act 1 Finale)"
10. "My Name Is Tallulah
11. "I'm Feeling Fine"
12. "So You Wanna Be a Boxer?"
13. "Ordinary Fool"
14. "Down and Out"
15. "You Give a Little Love (Act 2 Finale)"
16. "Exit Music"
