= Éric Le Hung =

Vietnamese-French film director

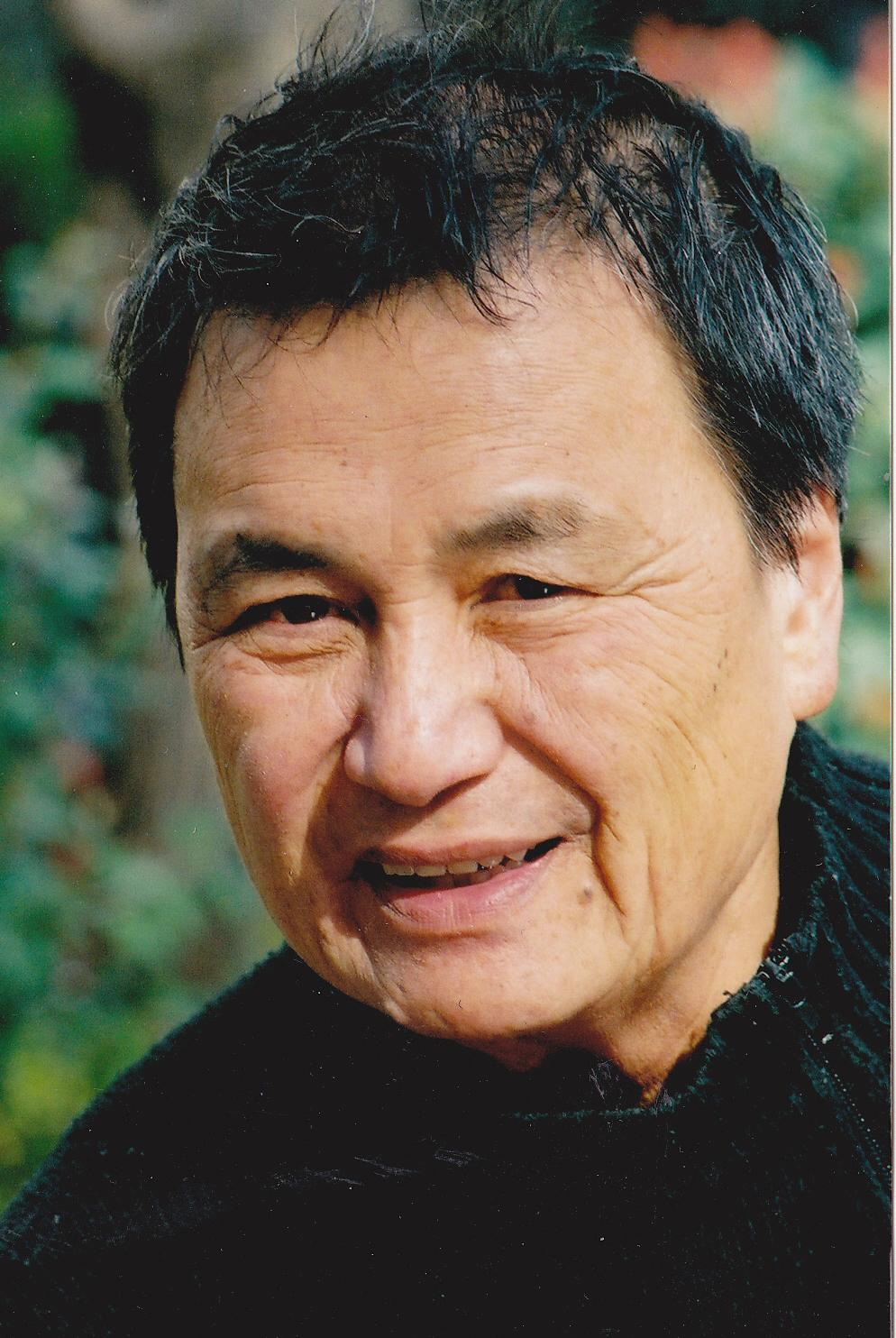
Éric Le Hung

Éric Le Hung (born 29 September 1937, Haiphong, French Indochina) is a Vietnamese-French film director.

== Selected films ==
- Moi, fleur bleue - 1977
- Le Droit d'aimer - 1972
