= John Cassisi =

American actor (born 1962)

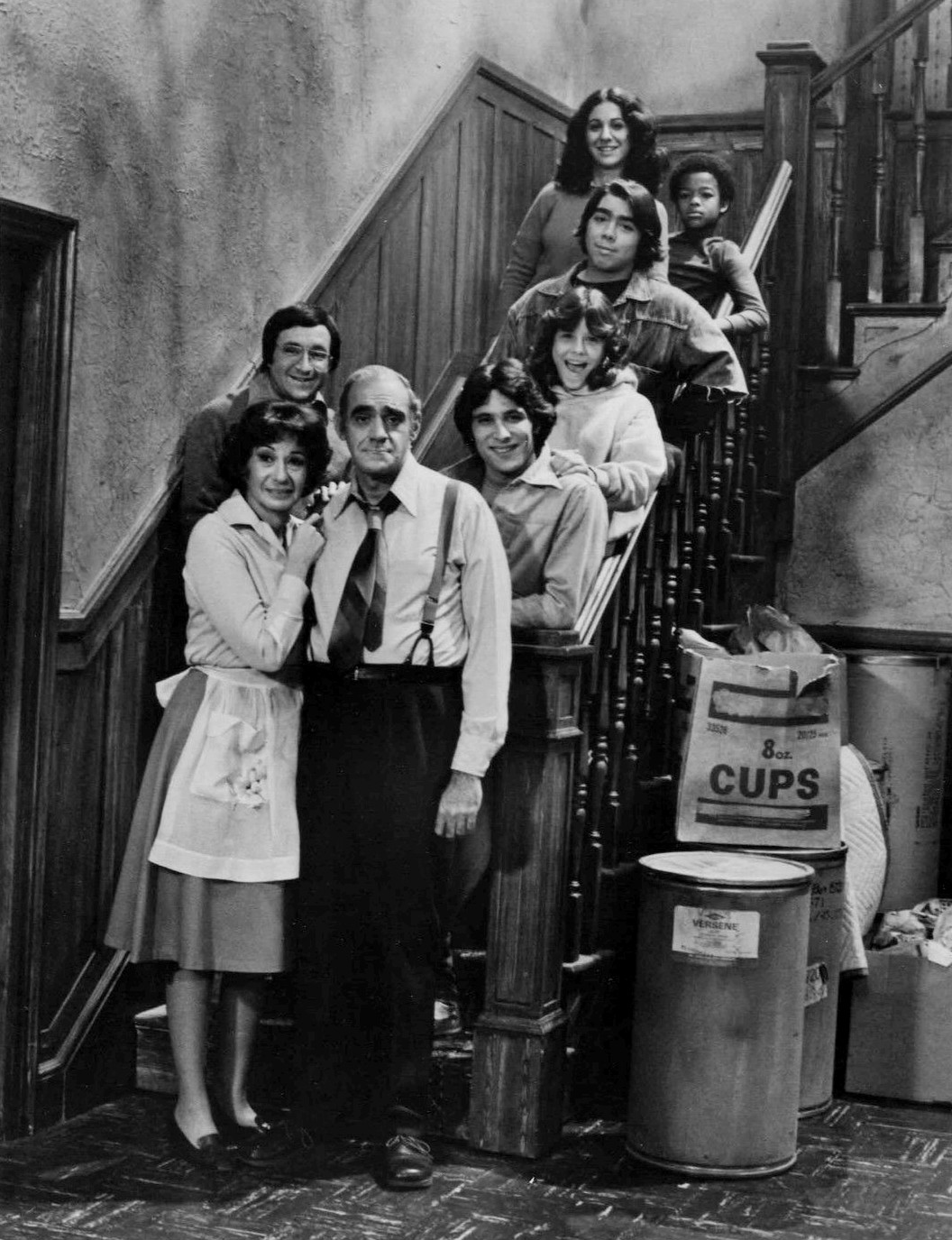
- Cassisi (3rd from top) posing for a photo with the cast of Fish in 1977
- Born: September 5, 1962 (age 64); Brooklyn, New York, U.S.
- Occupations: Child actor (1976–1982); Construction executive
- Years active: 1976–1982
- Known for: Portraying Fat Sam Staccetto in Bugsy Malone
- Notable work: Bugsy Malone
- Television: Fish
- Children: 3

John Cassisi (born September 5, 1962) is an American former child actor who starred in the 1976 movie Bugsy Malone as "Fat Sam" and subsequently starred in the television series Fish.

== Career ==
Cassisi was "discovered" by Bugsy Malone director Alan Parker, when Parker visited a Brooklyn classroom and asked students to nominate the "naughtiest" boy in class.

In 1982, he played the role of Herschel in the Broadway on Showtime film of Gemini alongside former Bugsy Malone star Scott Baio.

== Bribery ==
After retiring from acting in 1982, Cassisi ran a construction company. From 2012 to 2014, he served as the "Director of Global Construction for Citi Realty Services" for Citigroup. In 2015, he pleaded guilty to a bribery scheme and was sentenced to six years in prison plus a $500,000 forfeiture.

== Personal life ==
Cassisi is married, and lived in East Northport, Long Island. He has three children; his eldest son, Robert, died after suffering from a pulmonary embolism at the age of 26.

== Partial filmography ==
Year	Title	Role	Notes
1976	Bugsy Malone	Fat Sam Staccetto	
1977	Barney Miller	Victor Kreutzer	2 episodes, backdoor pilot for Fish
1977–1978	Fish	Victor Kreutzer	Series regular
1982	Gemini	Herschel	
