= Jodie Foster =

American actress (born 1962)

- Foster at the 2026 New York Film Festival
- Born: Alicia Christian Foster; November 19, 1962 (age 64); Los Angeles, California, U.S.
- Education: Yale University (BA)
- Occupations: Actress; producer; director
- Years active: since 1965
- Works: Filmography
- Height: 5 ft 3 in (160 cm)
- Spouse: Alexandra Hedison (m. 2014)
- Partner: Cydney Bernard (1993–2008)
- Children: 2, including Charlie
- Relatives: Buddy Foster (brother)
- Awards: Full list

Alicia Christian "Jodie" Foster (born November 19, 1962) is an American actress and filmmaker. Foster started her career as a child actor before establishing herself as a leading actress in film. She is recognized for her versatility, having received multiple accolades including two Academy Awards, three BAFTA Awards, four Golden Globe Awards, a Primetime Emmy Award, the Cecil B. DeMille Award, and the Honorary Palme d'Or.

Foster began her career as a child model and gained recognition as a teen idol through Disney films, including Napoleon and Samantha (1972) and Freaky Friday (1976). She appeared in Martin Scorsese's comedy-drama Alice Doesn't Live Here Anymore (1974) and was nominated for an Academy Award for Best Supporting Actress for her role as a 12-year-old prostitute in his film Taxi Driver (1976).

Other early films include Tom Sawyer (1973) and Bugsy Malone (1976). After attending Yale University, Foster transitioned into mature leading roles and won two Academy Awards for Best Actress for playing a rape victim in The Accused (1988) and Clarice Starling in The Silence of the Lambs (1991). She has also been nominated for Nell (1994) and Nyad (2023). On television, Foster starred in the HBO anthology series True Detective: Night Country (2024), for which she won a Primetime Emmy Award and Golden Globe Award.

Foster has directed four feature length films: Little Man Tate (1991), Home for the Holidays (1995), The Beaver (2011), and Money Monster (2016). She founded a production company, Egg Pictures, in 1992. Foster also received Primetime Emmy nominations for producing The Baby Dance (1998) and for directing the Orange Is the New Black episode "Lesbian Request Denied" (2013). She has also directed episodes of Tales from the Darkside (1988), House of Cards (2014), the Black Mirror episode "Arkangel" (2017), and Tales from the Loop (2020).

== Early life and education ==
Alicia Christian Foster was born on November 19, 1962, in Los Angeles, California, the youngest child of Evelyn Ella "Brandy" (née Almond; 1928–2019) and Lucius Fisher Foster III (1922–2016), a businessman. She is of German, Irish, and English heritage. On her father's side, she is descended from John Alden, who arrived in North America on the Mayflower in 1620.

Her parents' marriage ended before she was born, and she never established a relationship with her father. She has three older full siblings: Lucinda, Constance "Connie", and Lucius "Buddy"; as well as three half-brothers from her father's earlier marriage. Following the divorce, Brandy raised the children with her female partner in Los Angeles. She worked as a publicist for film producer Arthur P. Jacobs until focusing on managing the acting careers of Buddy and Jodie. Although Foster was officially named Alicia, her siblings began calling her "Jodie", and the name stuck.

Foster was a gifted child who learned to read at age three. She attended the Lycée Français de Los Angeles, a French-language prep school. Her fluency in French has enabled her to act in French films. She also dubs herself in French-language versions of most of her English-language films. At her graduation in 1980, she delivered the valedictorian address for the school's French division.

She subsequently studied at Yale University, where she majored in African-American literature. She wrote her thesis on Toni Morrison under the guidance of Henry Louis Gates Jr. and graduated magna cum laude in 1985. She returned to Yale in 1993 to address the graduating class and received an honorary Doctor of Fine Arts degree in 1997. In 2018, she was awarded the Yale Undergraduate Lifetime Achievement Award.

== Career ==
=== Career beginnings ===
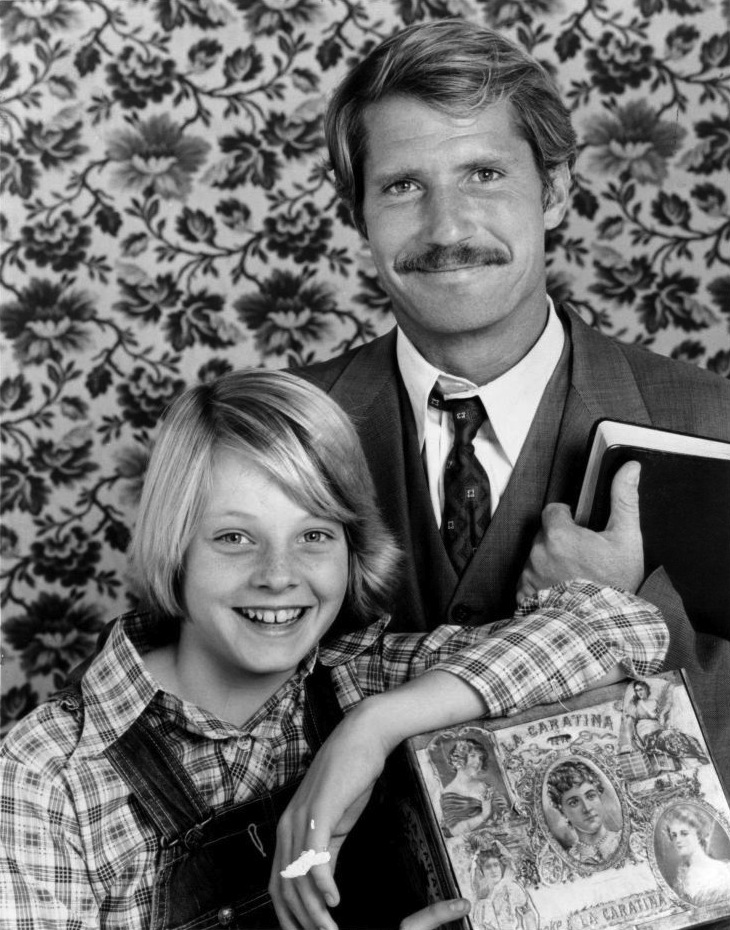
Foster with Christopher Connelly in a publicity photo for Paper Moon (1974), one of her first starring roles

Foster's career began with an appearance in a Coppertone television advertisement in 1965, when she was three years old. Her mother had intended only for Jodie's older brother Buddy to audition, but had taken Jodie with them to the casting call, where she was noticed by the casting agents. The television spot led to more advertising work and in 1968 to a minor appearance in the sitcom Mayberry R.F.D., in which her brother starred. In the following years, Foster continued working in advertising and appeared in over 50 television shows, including Gunsmoke, The Doris Day Show, My Three Sons, Bonanza, and Kung Fu; she and her brother became the breadwinners of the family during this time. She had recurring roles in The Courtship of Eddie's Father (1969–1971) and Bob & Carol & Ted & Alice (1973), voiced Pugsley Addams in The Addams Family animated series (1973–1975), and starred opposite Christopher Connelly in the short-lived Paper Moon (1974), adapted from the hit film.

Foster also appeared in films, mostly for Disney. After a role in the television film Menace on the Mountain (1970), she made her feature film debut in Napoleon and Samantha (1972), playing a girl who befriends a boy, played by Johnny Whitaker, and his pet lion. She was accidentally grabbed by the lion on set, which left her with scars on her back. Her other early film work includes the Raquel Welch vehicle Kansas City Bomber (1972), the Western One Little Indian (1973), the adaptation of Mark Twain's Tom Sawyer (1973), and Martin Scorsese's Alice Doesn't Live Here Anymore (1974), in which she appeared in a supporting role as a "Ripple-drinking street kid".

Foster said she loved acting as a child and values her early work for the experience it gave her: "Some people get quick breaks and declare, 'I'll never do commercials! That's so lowbrow!' I want to tell them, 'Well, I'm real glad you've got a pretty face, because I worked for 20 years doing that stuff and I feel it's really invaluable; it really taught me a lot.'"

=== 1970s: Taxi Driver and teenage stardom ===
Foster's mother was concerned that her daughter's career would end by the time she grew out of playing children and decided that Foster should also begin acting in films for adult audiences. After the minor supporting role in Alice, Scorsese cast her in the role of a child prostitute in Taxi Driver (1976). To be able to do the film, Foster had to undergo psychiatric assessment and was accompanied by a social worker on set. Her older sister Connie acted as her stand-in in sexually suggestive scenes. Foster later commented on the role, saying that she hated "the idea that everybody thinks if a kid's going to be an actress it means that she has to play Shirley Temple or someone's little sister." During the filming, Foster developed a bond with co-star Robert De Niro, who saw "serious potential" in her and dedicated time to rehearsing scenes with her.

Foster called Taxi Driver a life-changing experience and said it was "the first time anyone asked me to create a character that wasn't myself. It was the first time I realized that acting wasn't this hobby you just sort of did, but that there was actually some craft." Taxi Driver won the Palme d'Or at the Cannes Film Festival, where Foster impressed journalists when she acted as a French interpreter at the press conference. Taxi Driver was a critical and commercial success, and earned her a supporting actress Academy Award nomination, as well as two BAFTAs, a David di Donatello and a National Society of Film Critics award. The film is considered one of the best in history by the American Film Institute and Sight & Sound, and has been preserved in the National Film Registry.

Foster also acted in another film nominated for the Palme d'Or in 1976, Bugsy Malone, a British musical that parodied films about Prohibition Era gangsters by having all roles played by children. Foster appeared in a major supporting role as a star of a speakeasy show. Director Alan Parker was impressed by her, saying that "she takes such an intelligent interest in the way the film is being made that if I had been run over by a bus I think she was probably the only person on the set able to take over as director." She gained several positive notices for her performance, with Roger Ebert of the Chicago Sun-Times writing: "at thirteen she was already getting the roles that grown-up actresses complained weren't being written for women anymore". Variety called her "outstanding", and Vincent Canby of The New York Times called her "the star of the show". Foster's two BAFTAs were awarded jointly for her performances in Taxi Driver and Bugsy Malone.

Her third film release in 1976 was the independent drama Echoes of a Summer, which had been filmed two years earlier. The New York Times named Foster's performance as a terminally ill girl the film's "main strength" and Gene Siskel of the Chicago Tribune wrote that she "is not a good child actress; she's just a good actress", although both reviewers panned the film. Foster's fourth film of 1976 was the Canadian-French thriller The Little Girl Who Lives Down the Lane, in which she starred opposite Martin Sheen. The film combined aspects of thriller and horror genres, and showed Foster as a mysterious young girl living on her own in a small town. The performance earned her a Saturn Award. In November, Foster hosted Saturday Night Live, becoming the youngest person to do so until Drew Barrymore hosted at age 7 in 1982. Her final film of the year was the Disney comedy Freaky Friday, "her first true star vehicle". She played a tomboy teen who accidentally changes bodies with her mother, and she later said the film marked a "transitional period" when she began to grow out of child roles. It received mainly positive reviews, and was a box-office success, gaining Foster a Golden Globe nomination for her performance.

As Foster grew, her mother wanted photos to reflect Foster's ability to take on adult roles, so she arranged for Emilio Lari to do a partially nude photoshoot. The photoshoot was taken at a rented estate in Los Angeles, with Foster's mother and Lari's wife on set. Estimates of the year of the photoshoot range between 1975 and 1979, when Foster was between 13 and 16. After her breakthrough year, Foster spent nine months living in France, where she starred in Moi, fleur bleue (1977) and recorded several songs for its soundtrack. Her other films released in 1977 were the Italian comedy Casotto and the Disney heist film Candleshoe, which was filmed in England and co-starred David Niven and Helen Hayes.

=== 1980s: Transition to adult roles and The Accused ===
In 1980, she gained positive notices for her performances in the independent films Foxes and Carny (1980), before becoming a full-time student at Yale in 1981. She later said that going to college changed her thoughts about acting, which she had previously thought was an unintelligent profession. She realized that "what I really wanted to do was to act and there was nothing stupid about it."

Although Foster prioritized college during these years, she continued making films on her summer vacations. These were O'Hara's Wife (1982), the television film Svengali (1983), the John Irving adaptation The Hotel New Hampshire (1984), The Blood of Others (1984), and the period drama Mesmerized (1986), which she also co-produced. None of them gained large audiences or critical appreciation.

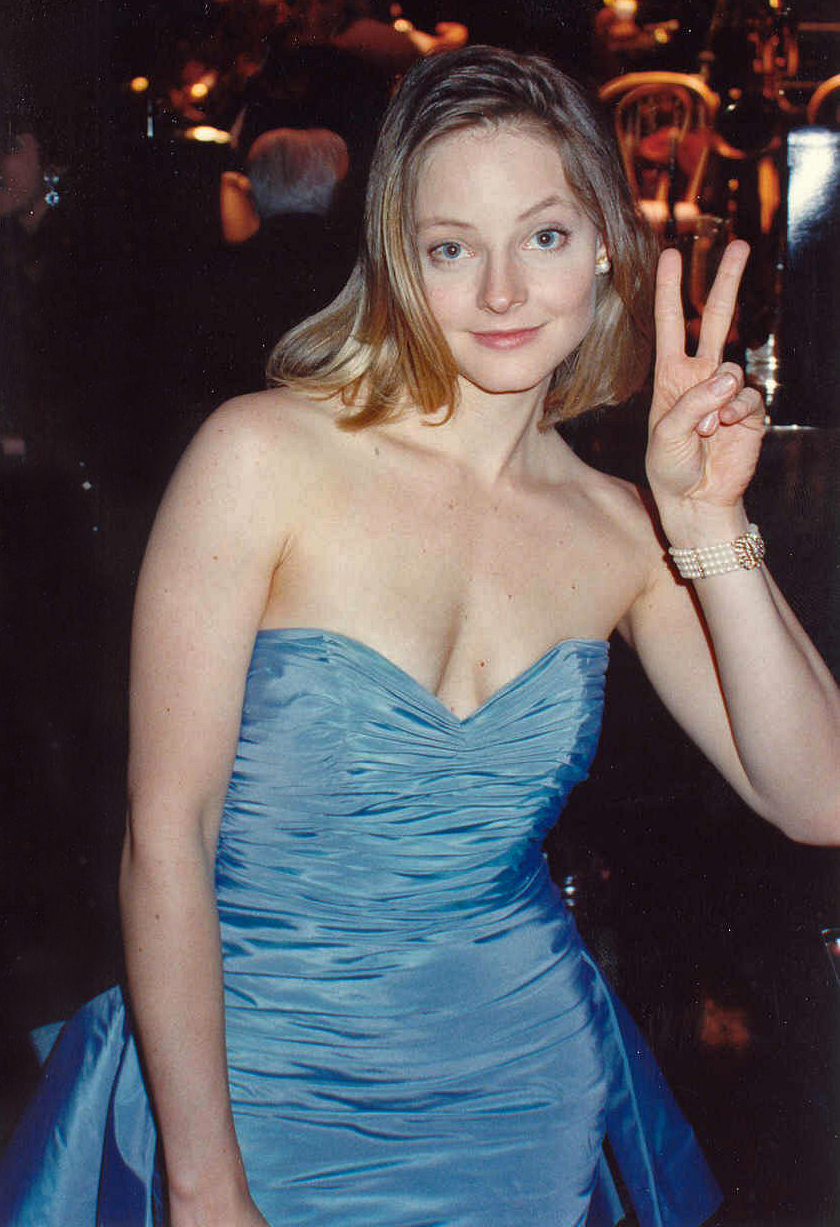
Foster at the Governor's Ball after winning an Academy Award for The Accused (1988). Her performance as a rape survivor marked her breakthrough into adult roles.

After graduating from Yale in 1985, Foster struggled to find further acting work. In 1987, her first film after college, the neo-noir Siesta (1987), was rated a failure, but her next project, the independent film Five Corners (1987), was better received. A moderate critical success, it earned Foster an Independent Spirit Award for her performance as a woman whose sexual assaulter returns to stalk her.

The following year, Foster made her debut as a director with the episode "Do Not Open This Box" for the horror anthology series Tales from the Darkside, and starred in the romantic drama Stealing Home (1988) opposite Mark Harmon. The film was a critical and commercial failure, with Roger Ebert "wondering if any movie could possibly be that bad".

Foster's breakthrough into adult roles came with her performance as a rape survivor in The Accused (1988). Based on the real criminal case involving Cheryl Araujo, the film focuses on the aftermath of a gang rape and its survivor's fight for justice in the face of victim blaming. Before making it, Foster was having doubts about whether to continue her career and planned to start graduate studies, but decided to give acting "one last try" in The Accused. She had to audition twice for the role and was cast only after several more established actors turned it down, as the film's producers were wary of her due to her previous failures and because she was still remembered as a "chubby teenager". Due to the subject matter, the filming was a difficult experience for the cast and crew, especially the shooting of the rape scene, which took five days. Foster was unhappy with her performance and feared that it would end her career. Instead, The Accused received positive reviews, with Foster's performance receiving widespread acclaim and earning her Academy, Golden Globe and National Board of Review awards, as well as a nomination for a BAFTA Award.

=== 1990s: Box-office success, directorial debut and Egg Pictures ===
Foster's first film release after the success of The Accused was the thriller The Silence of the Lambs (1991). She portrayed FBI trainee Clarice Starling, who is sent to interview incarcerated serial killer Hannibal Lecter (Anthony Hopkins) in order to hunt another serial killer, Jame "Buffalo Bill" Gumb (Ted Levine). Foster later named the role one of her favorites. She had read the novel it was based on after its publication in 1988 and had attempted to purchase its film rights, as it featured "a real female heroine" and its plot was not "about steroids and brawn, [but] about using your mind and using your insufficiencies to combat the villain." Despite her enthusiasm, director Jonathan Demme did not initially want to cast her, but the producers overruled him. Demme's view of Foster changed during the production, and he later credited her for helping him define the character.

Released in February 1991, The Silence of the Lambs became one of the biggest hits of the year, grossing close to $273 million, with a positive critical reception. Foster received largely positive reviews and won Academy, Golden Globe, and BAFTA awards for her portrayal of Starling; Silence won five Academy Awards overall, becoming one of the few films to win in all main categories. In contrast, some reviewers criticized the film as misogynist for its focus on brutal murders of women, and homo-/transphobic due to its portrayal of "Buffalo Bill" as bisexual and transgender. Much of the criticism was directed at Foster, who the critics claimed was herself a lesbian. Despite the controversy, the film is considered a modern classic: Starling and Lecter are included on the American Film Institute's top ten of the greatest film heroes and villains, and the film is preserved in the National Film Registry. Later in 1991, Foster also starred in the unsuccessful low-budget thriller Catchfire, which had been filmed before Silence, but was released after it in an attempt to profit from its success.

In October 1991, Foster released her first feature film as a director, Little Man Tate, a drama about a child prodigy who struggles to come to terms with being different. The main role was played by previously unknown actor Adam Hann-Byrd, and Foster co-starred as his working-class single mother. She had found the script in the "slush pile" at Orion Pictures, and explained that for her debut film she "wanted a piece that was not autobiographical, but that had to do with the 10 philosophies I've accumulated in the past 25 years. Every single one of them, if they weren't in the script from the beginning, they're there now." Some reviewers felt that the film did not live up to the high expectations, and regarded it as "less adventurous than many films in which [she] had starred", but others praised it, like Roger Ebert, who called it "the kind of film you enjoy watching". Regardless, it was a moderate box office success. Foster's final film appearance of the year came in a small role as a sex worker in Shadows and Fog (1991), directed by Woody Allen, with whom she had wanted to collaborate since the 1970s.

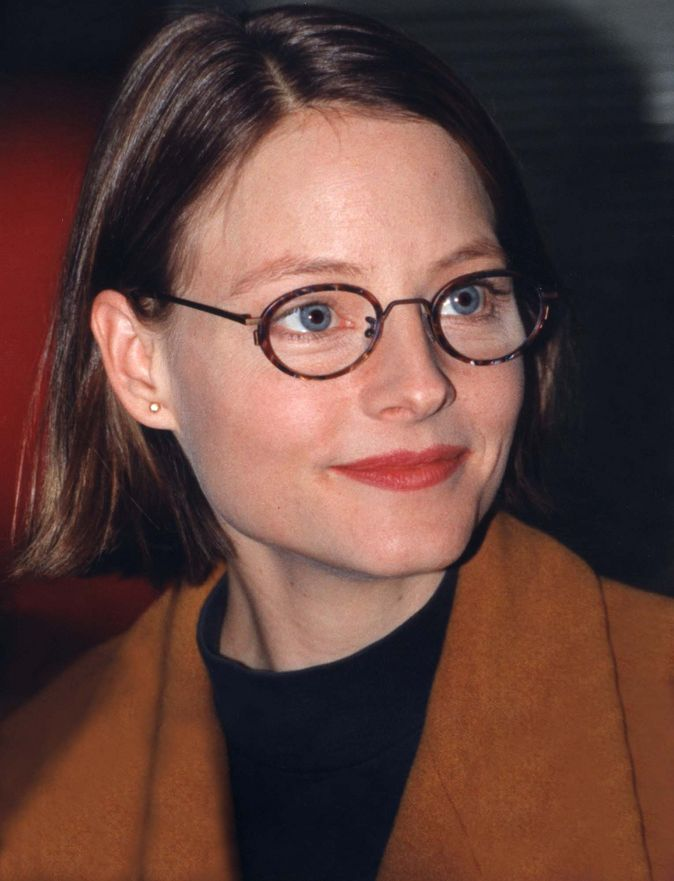
Foster working on Home for the Holidays, 1995

The nineties and onwards has seen Foster in more action-oriented roles. Foster starred in the period film Sommersby (1993), portraying a woman who begins to suspect that her husband (Richard Gere) who returns home from the Civil War is an impostor. She then replaced Meg Ryan in the Western comedy Maverick (1994), playing a con artist opposite Mel Gibson and James Garner. She appeared in the sci-fi film Contact (1997), and the commercially successful Panic Room (2002). Other action films have included Flightplan (2005) and Nim's Island (2008). Elysium (2013) saw her opposite Matt Damon in a dystopian thriller.

According to film scholar Karen Hollinger, these later films were more "conventionally feminine" roles. Both Sommersby and Maverick were box office successes.

Foster had founded her own production company, Egg Pictures, a subsidiary of PolyGram Filmed Entertainment in 1992, and released its first production, Nell, in December 1994. (Note: She was to produce up to six films, each with the budget of $10–25 million, in the following three years.) It was directed by Michael Apted and starred Foster in the titular role as a woman who grew up isolated in the Appalachian Mountains and speaks her own invented language. The film was based on Mark Handley's play Idioglossia, which interested Foster for its theme of "otherness", and because she "loved this idea of a woman who defies categorization, a creature who is labeled and categorized by people based on their own problems and their own prejudices and what they bring to the table." Despite mixed reviews, it was a commercial success, and earned Foster a Screen Actors Guild Award and nominations for an Academy Award and a Golden Globe for her acting performance.

The second film that Foster directed and produced for Egg Pictures was Home for the Holidays, released in late 1995. A black comedy "set around a nightmarish Thanksgiving", it starred Holly Hunter and Robert Downey Jr. The film received a mixed critical response and was a commercial failure. In 1996, Foster received two honorary awards: the Crystal Award, awarded annually for women in the entertainment industry, and the Berlinale Camera at the 46th Berlin International Film Festival. She voiced a character in an episode of Frasier in 1996 and in an episode of The X-Files in early 1997.

After Nell (1994), Foster appeared in no new film releases until Contact (1997), a science fiction film based on a novel by Carl Sagan and directed by Robert Zemeckis. She starred as a scientist searching for extraterrestrial life in the SETI project. The film was a commercial success and earned Foster a Saturn Award and a nomination for a Golden Globe. (Note: She was in talks to star in David Fincher's thriller The Game, but its production company, Polygram, dropped her from the project after disagreements over her role. Foster sued the company, saying that she had an oral agreement with them to star in the film and had as a result taken "herself off the market" and lost out on other film projects. The case was later settled out of court.) Foster next produced Jane Anderson's television film The Baby Dance (1998) for Showtime. Its story deals with a wealthy California couple who struggles with infertility and decides to adopt from a poor family in Louisiana. On her decision to produce for television, Foster stated that it was easier to take financial risks in that medium than in feature films. In 1998, she also moved her production company from PolyGram to Paramount Pictures. Also in 1998, asteroid 17744 Jodiefoster was named in her honor.

Foster's last film of the 1990s was the period drama Anna and the King (1999), in which she starred opposite Chow Yun-Fat. It was based on a fictionalized biography of British teacher Anna Leonowens, who taught the children of King Mongkut of Siam, and whose story became well known as the musical The King and I. Foster was paid $15 million to portray Leonowens, making her one of the highest-paid female actors in Hollywood. The film was subject to controversy when the Thai government deemed it historically inaccurate and insulting to the royal family and banned its distribution in the country. It was a moderate commercial success, but received mixed to negative reviews. Ebert panned the film, saying the role required Foster "to play beneath [her] intelligence" and The New York Times called it a "misstep" for her and accused her of only being "interested ... in sanctifying herself as an old-fashioned heroine than in taking on dramatically risky roles".

=== 2000s: Career setbacks and resurgence in thrillers ===
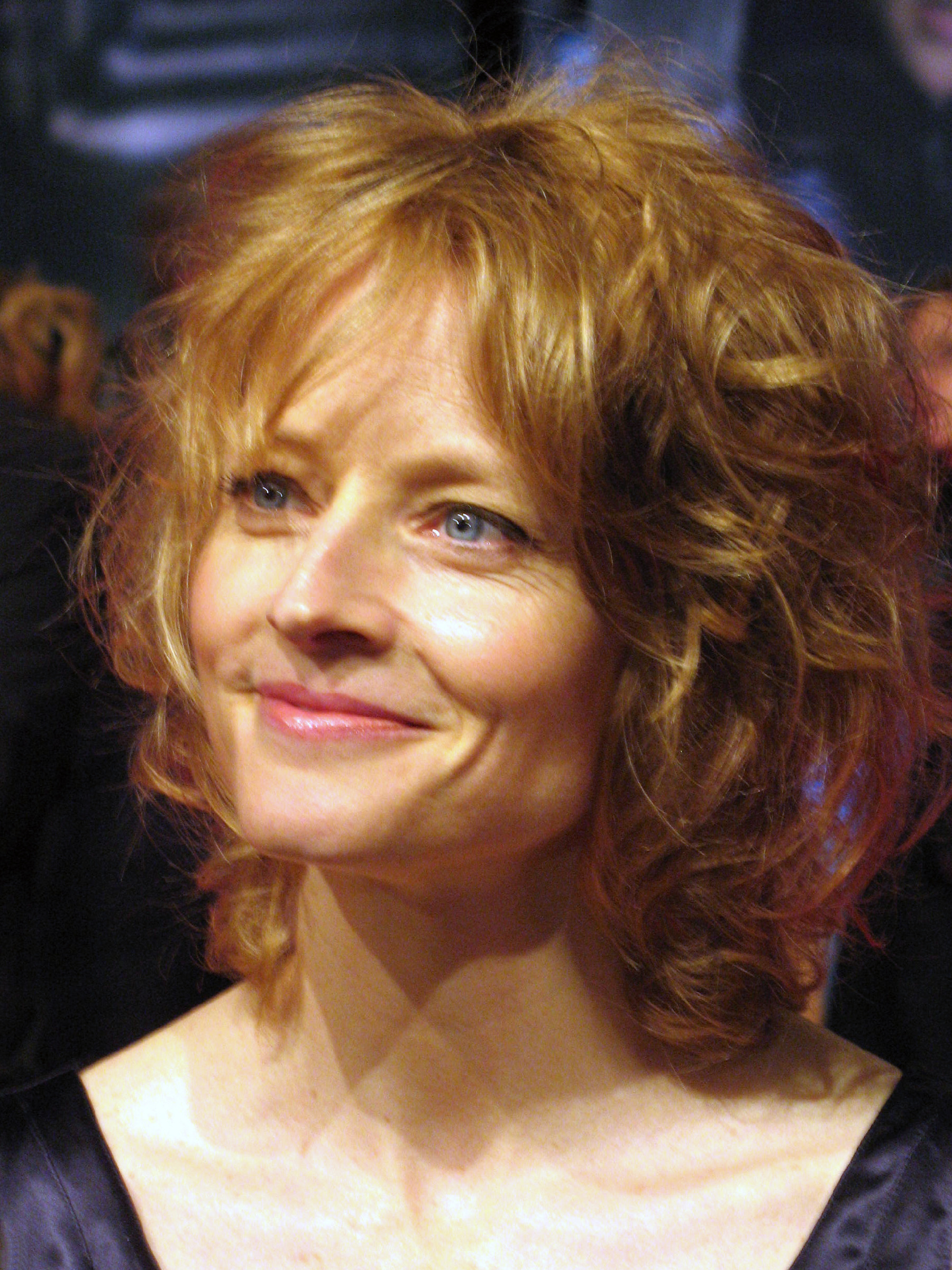
Foster at the premiere of The Brave One in 2007

Foster's first project of the new decade was Keith Gordon's film Waking the Dead (2000), which she produced. She declined to reprise her role as Clarice Starling in Hannibal (2001), with the part going instead to Julianne Moore, and concentrated on a new directorial project, Flora Plum. It was to focus on a 1930s circus and star Claire Danes and Russell Crowe, but had to be shelved after Crowe was injured on set and could not complete filming on schedule; Foster unsuccessfully attempted to revive the project several times in the following years. Controversially, she also expressed interest in directing and starring in a biographical film of Nazi film director Leni Riefenstahl, who did not like the idea. In addition to these setbacks, Foster shut down Egg Pictures in 2001, saying that producing was "just a really thankless, bad job". The company's last production, The Dangerous Lives of Altar Boys, premiered at the Sundance Film Festival in January 2002. It received good reviews, and had a limited theatrical release in the summer. After the cancellation of Flora Plum, Foster took on the main role in David Fincher's thriller Panic Room after its intended star, Nicole Kidman, had to drop out due to an injury on the set of Moulin Rouge!. Before filming resumed, Foster was given only a week to prepare for the role of a woman who hides in a panic room with her daughter when burglars invade their home. It grossed over $30 million on its North American opening weekend in March 2002, becoming the most successful film opening of Foster's career as of 2015. In addition to being a box office success, the film also received largely positive reviews.

After a minor appearance in the French period drama A Very Long Engagement (2004), Foster starred in three more thrillers. The first was Flightplan (2005), in which she played a woman whose daughter vanishes during an overnight flight. It became a global box office success, but received mixed reviews. It was followed by Spike Lee's critically and commercially successful Inside Man (2006), about a bank heist on Wall Street, which co-starred Denzel Washington and Clive Owen. The third thriller, The Brave One (2007), prompted some comparisons to Taxi Driver, as Foster played a New Yorker who becomes a vigilante after her fiancé is murdered. It was not a success, but earned Foster her sixth Golden Globe nomination. Her last film role of the decade was in the children's adventure film Nim's Island (2008), in which she portrayed an agoraphobic writer opposite Gerard Butler and Abigail Breslin. It was the first comedy in which she had starred since Maverick (1994), and was a commercial success but a critical failure. In 2009, she provided the voice for Maggie in a tetralogy episode of The Simpsons titled "Four Great Women and a Manicure".

=== 2010s: Focus on directing ===
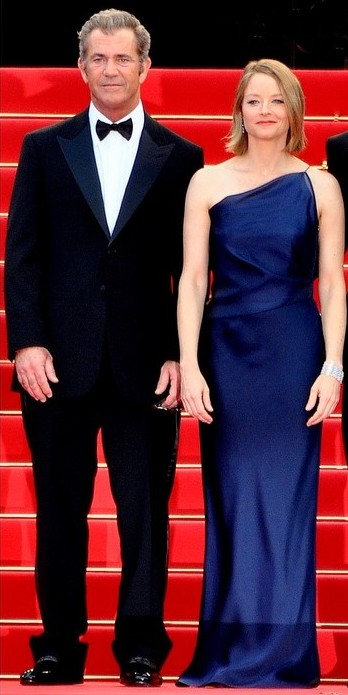
Foster with co-star Mel Gibson at the premiere of The Beaver at the 2011 Cannes Film Festival

In the 2010s, Foster focused on directing and took fewer acting roles. In February 2011, she hosted the 36th César Awards in France, and the next month released her third feature film direction, The Beaver (2011), about a depressed man who develops an alternative personality based on a beaver hand puppet. It starred Maverick co-star Mel Gibson and featured herself, Anton Yelchin and Jennifer Lawrence in supporting roles as his family. Foster called its production "probably the biggest struggle of my professional career", partly due to the film's heavy subject matter but also due to the controversy that Gibson generated when he was accused of domestic violence and making antisemitic, racist, and sexist statements. The film received mixed reviews, and failed at the box office, largely due to this controversy. In 2011, Foster also appeared as part of an ensemble cast with John C. Reilly, Kate Winslet and Christoph Waltz in Roman Polanski's comedy Carnage, in which the attempts of middle-class parents to settle an incident between their sons descends into chaos. It premiered to mainly positive reviews and earned Foster a Golden Globe nomination as Best Actress.

In 2013, Foster received the honorary Cecil B. DeMille Award at the 70th Golden Globe Awards. Her next film role was Secretary of Defense Delacourt opposite Matt Damon in the dystopian film Elysium (2013), which was a box office success. She also returned to television directing for the first time since the 1980s, directing the episodes "Lesbian Request Denied" (2013) and "Thirsty Bird" (2014) for Orange Is the New Black, and the episode "Chapter 22" (2014) for House of Cards. "Lesbian Request Denied" brought her a Primetime Emmy Award nomination, and the two 2014 episodes earned her two nominations for a Directors Guild of America Award. She also narrated the episode "Women in Space" (2014) for Makers: Women Who Make America, a PBS documentary series about women's struggle for equal rights in the United States. In 2015, Foster received the Laura Ziskin Lifetime Achievement Award at the Athena Film Festival.

The fourth film Foster directed, the hostage drama Money Monster, premiered out-of-competition at the Cannes Film Festival in May 2016. It starred George Clooney and Julia Roberts, and despite mixed reviews, was a moderate commercial success. The next year, Foster continued her work in television by directing an episode, "Arkangel", for the British sci-fi anthology series Black Mirror (2011–).

As the decade drew to a close, Foster continued to mix acting with directing. She starred together with Sterling Brown in the dystopian film Hotel Artemis (2018). Although the film was a commercial and critical disappointment, Foster's performance as Nurse Jean Thomas, who runs a hospital for criminals, received positive notices. Mick LaSalle of the San Francisco Chronicle wrote, "not enough can be said about the performance of Foster in this film. She brings to the role a quality of having seen the absolute worst in people, but also the suggestion that, as a result, she accepts them on their own terms and knows how to handle any situation." Rick Bentley from Tampa Bay Times declared Foster's performance one of her "best and most memorable." The same year, Foster co-produced and narrated Be Natural: The Untold Story of Alice Guy-Blaché (2018), a documentary on one of the first female film directors.

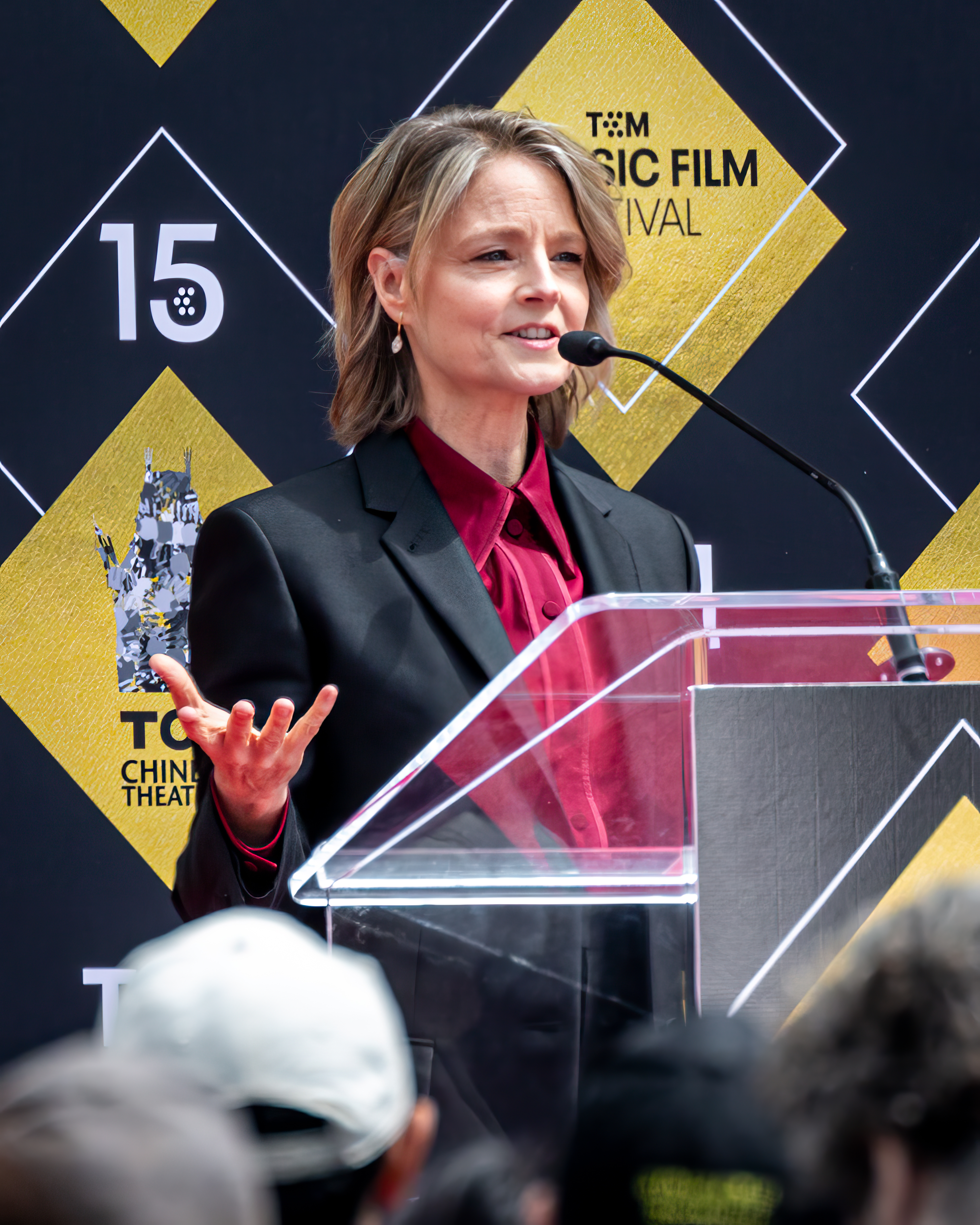
Foster speaking at Grauman's Chinese Theatre in April 2024 during the ceremony in which she immortalized her hands and footprints

=== 2020s: Return to acting ===
Foster directed the finale of the 2020 science fiction drama Tales from the Loop. Her next project was the legal drama The Mauritanian (2021), in which she starred as the lawyer of a prisoner (Tahar Rahim) at the Guantanamo Bay detention camp. Foster won a Best Supporting Actress Golden Globe for her performance. At the 2021 Cannes Film Festival, Foster received the Honorary Palme d'Or for lifetime achievement.

In 2023, Foster appeared in the Netflix biopic Nyad as Bonnie Stoll. Her performance earned her a nomination for the Academy Award for Best Supporting Actress. On April 19, 2024, she immortalized her hand and footprints in wet cement at Grauman's Chinese Theater in Los Angeles, California. Also in 2024, she starred in the fourth season of True Detective, subtitled Night Country, which won her a Primetime Emmy Award, and was an executive producer on Alok, a short film directed by her wife Alexandra Hedison. She starred in the 2025 French-language psychological mystery, Vie privée (A Private Life), her first French-speaking lead role, for which she received critical acclaim.

== Personal life ==
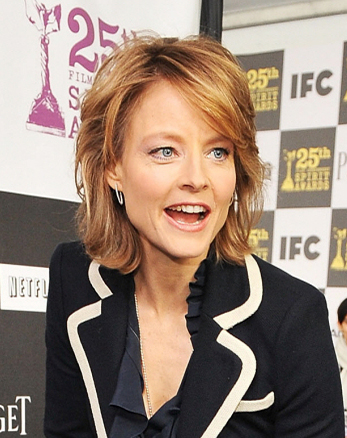
Foster in 2010

Foster met producer Cydney Bernard, then a production coordinator, on the set of Sommersby (1993). They were in a relationship from 1993 until 2008 and had two children together: Charles ("Charlie"), born in 1998, and Christopher ("Kit"), born in 2001. Foster is their biological mother; the biological father's identity has not been made public. In 2014, Foster married actress and photographer Alexandra Hedison after a year of dating.

Foster's sexual orientation became the subject of public discussion in 1991 when publications such as OutWeek and The Village Voice, protesting against the alleged homophobia and transphobia in The Silence of the Lambs, claimed she was a lesbian. She publicly acknowledged her 14-year relationship with Bernard in 2007 in a speech at The Hollywood Reporter's "Women in Entertainment" breakfast honoring her. In 2013, she addressed her decision to come out in a speech after receiving the Cecil B. DeMille Award at the 70th Golden Globe Awards, which led many news outlets to describe her as gay. Some sources noted that she did not use the words "gay" or "lesbian" in her speech.

On December 19, 1983, Foster was detained by U.S. customs agents at Logan International Airport for possessing a gram of cocaine. She was charged with a misdemeanor and placed on one year's probation.

In 2007, Foster told Entertainment Weekly that she is an atheist, though she "[loves] religions and the rituals. Even though I don't believe in God, we celebrate pretty much every religion in our family with the kids." In 2010, she explained that her family "ritualizes" all holidays: "I take pains to give my family a real religious basis, a knowledge, because it's being well educated. You need to know why all those wars were fought." She allowed her children to choose their own religions when they turned 18.

=== John Hinckley Jr. stalking incident ===
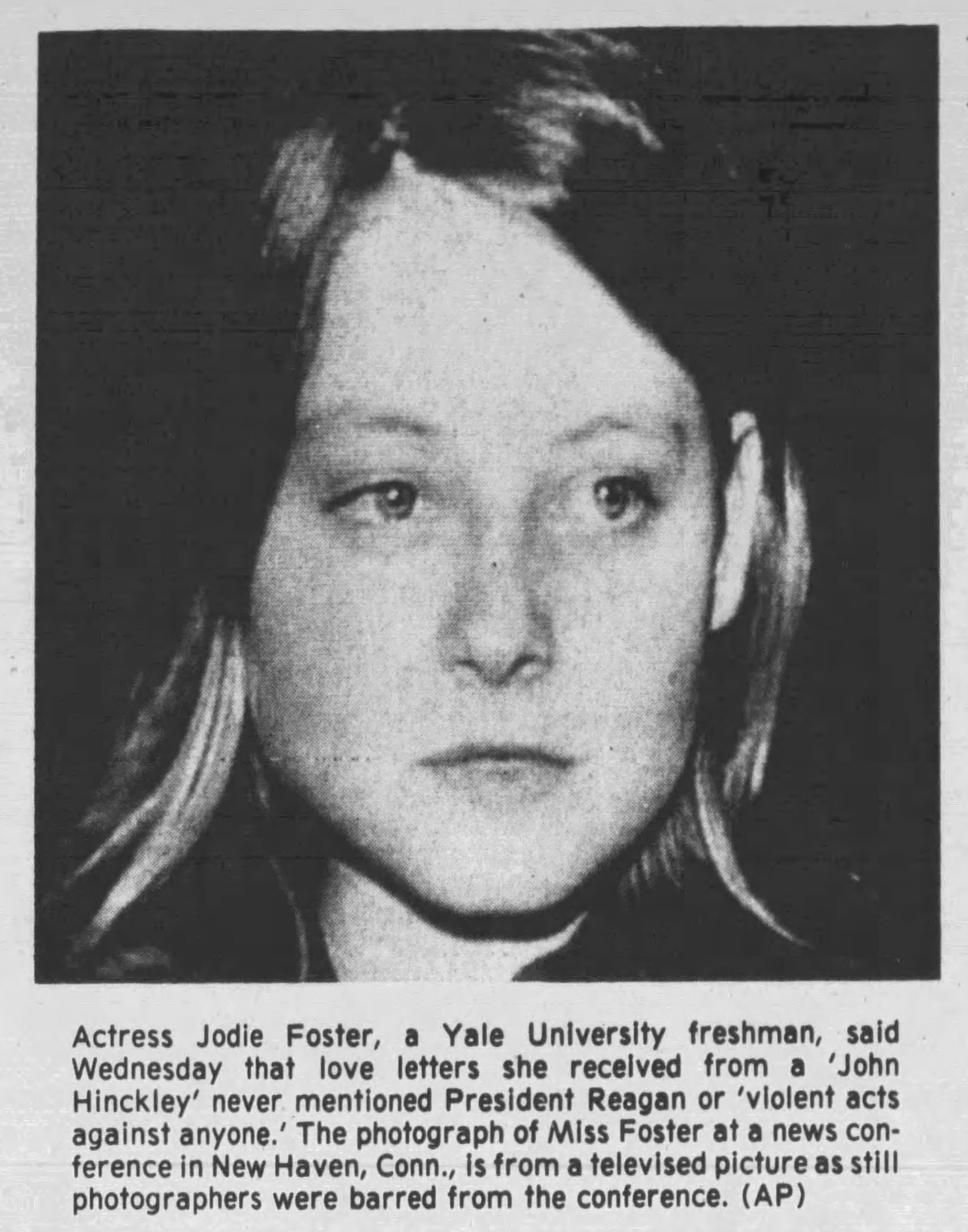
Newspaper clipping, April 2, 1981

During her freshman year at Yale in 1980–81, Foster was stalked by John Hinckley Jr., who had developed an obsession with her after watching Taxi Driver multiple times. He moved to New Haven and tried to contact her by letter and telephone. On March 30, 1981, Hinckley attempted to assassinate United States president Ronald Reagan, wounding him and three other people, claiming that his motive was to impress Foster. The incident drew intense media attention, and Foster was accompanied by bodyguards while on campus. Judge Barrington D. Parker confirmed that Foster was innocent in the case and had been "unwittingly ensnared in a third party's alleged attempt to assassinate an American President". Her videotaped testimony was played at Hinckley's trial. While at Yale, Foster also had other stalkers, including a man who planned to kill her but changed his mind after seeing her perform in a college play.

Foster has seldom publicly commented on Hinckley. She wrote an essay, "Why Me?", published in 1982 by Esquire on the condition that "there be no cover lines, no publicity and no photos". In 1991, she canceled an interview on NBC's The Today Show when she discovered that Hinckley would be mentioned in the introduction and the producers would not change it. She discussed Hinckley in a 1999 interview with Charlie Rose on 60 Minutes II, explaining that she does not "like to dwell on it too much ... I never wanted to be the actress who was remembered for that event. Because it didn't have anything to do with me. I was kind of a hapless bystander. But ... what a scarring, strange moment in history for me, to be 17 years old, 18 years old, and to be caught up in a drama like that." She said the incident had a major impact on her career choices, but also acknowledged that her experience was minimal compared to the suffering of Reagan's press secretary, James Brady, who was permanently disabled in the shooting and died from his injuries 33 years later, and his loved ones: "Whatever bad moments that I had certainly could never compare to that family."

== Acting credits and accolades ==
Foster has received two Academy Awards, three British Academy Film Awards, the Cannes Film Festival's Honorary Palme d'Or, four Golden Globe Awards, a Primetime Emmy Award, and a Screen Actors Guild Award. She also earned the Golden Globe Cecil B. DeMille Award in 2013.

Foster has been recognized by the Academy of Motion Picture Arts and Sciences (AMPAS) for the following films:

- 49th Academy Awards, Best Actress in a Supporting Role, nomination, Taxi Driver (1976)
- 61st Academy Awards, Best Actress in a Leading Role, The Accused (1988)
- 64th Academy Awards, Best Actress in a Leading Role, The Silence of the Lambs (1991)
- 67th Academy Awards, Best Actress in a Leading Role, nomination, Nell (1994)
- 96th Academy Awards, Best Actress in a Supporting Role, nomination, Nyad (2023)

People magazine named her the most beautiful woman in the world in 1992, and in 2003, she was voted Number 23 in Channel 4's countdown of the 100 Greatest Movie Stars of All Time. Entertainment Weekly named her 57th on their list of 100 Greatest Movie Stars of All Time in 1996. In 2016, she was inducted into the Hollywood Walk of Fame with a motion pictures star located at 6927 Hollywood Boulevard.

== See also ==
- List of oldest and youngest Academy Award winners and nominees – Youngest nominees for Best Actress in a Supporting Role
- List of LGBTQ Academy Award winners and nominees – Best Actress in a Leading Role winners and nominees
- List of actors with more than one Academy Award nomination in the acting categories
- List of atheists in film, radio, television and theater

== Notes ==
Explanatory footnotes

Citations

== General and cited references ==
- Cullen, Jim (2013). Sensing the Past: Hollywood Stars and Historical Visions. Oxford University Press. ISBN 978-0-19-992766-1.
- Erb, Cynthia (2010). "Jodie Foster and Brooke Shields: 'New Ways to Look at the Young'". In Morrison, James (ed.). Hollywood Reborn: Movie Stars of the 1970s. Rutgers University Press. ISBN 978-0-8135-4748-0.
- Hollinger, Karen (2006). The Actress: Hollywood Acting and the Female Star. Taylor and Francis. ISBN 978-0-415-97792-0.
- Hollinger, Karen (2012). "Jodie Foster: Feminist Hero?". In Everett, Anne (ed.). Pretty People: Movie Stars of the 1990s. Rutgers University Press. ISBN 978-0-8135-5244-6.
- Rausch, Andrew J. (2010). The Films of Martin Scorsese and Robert DeNiro. Scarecrow Press. ISBN 978-0-8108-7413-8.
- Snodgrass, Mary Ellen (2008). Beating the Odds: A Teen Guide to 75 Superstars Who Overcame Adversity. Greenwood Press. ISBN 978-0-313-34564-7.
- Sonneborn, Liz (2002). A to Z of American Women in the Performing Arts. Facts on File. ISBN 0-8160-4398-1.

Awards and achievements
Preceded by Cher	Best Actress in a Leading Role; 1988	Succeeded by Jessica Tandy
Preceded by Kathy Bates	Best Actress in a Leading Role; 1991	Succeeded by Emma Thompson
