= Moi, fleur bleue =

- Directed by: Éric Le Hung
- Written by: Philippe Bourgoin; Éric Le Hung
- Produced by: Guy Belfond
- Starring: Jean Yanne; Jodie Foster; Sydne Rome
- Cinematography: Marcel Combes
- Edited by: Christiane Lack
- Music by: François D'Aime
- Production companies: Axe Films; Peri Productions; Productions Yanne; Victorine Studios
- Release date: October 26, 1977 (France)
- Running time: 100 minutes
- Country: France
- Language: French
- Budget: $1.8 million

Moi, fleur bleue is a 1977 French comedy-drama film directed by Éric Le Hung. It stars Jean Yanne, Jodie Foster and Sydne Rome.

The film is sometimes known in English as Stop Calling Me Baby!. Foster plays Isabelle Tristan, nicknamed "Fleur bleue".

== Plot ==
Sophie Tristan, nicknamed "Blé des Champs", is a 22-year-old model whose younger sister Isabelle, known as "Fleur Bleue", is more outgoing than she is. Max, a truck driver, notices Sophie in the street and attempts to find her with the help of his friend Isidore, a former police officer. Sophie eventually begins a relationship with Max, while Isabelle experiences her first romance with Isidore.

The story also introduces several other characters, including café owner, a concierge, a school headmistress, a French teacher and a countess.

== Cast ==
- Jean Yanne as Max
- Jodie Foster as Isabelle Tristan, "Fleur bleue"
- Sydne Rome as Sophie Tristan, "Blé des Champs"
- Bernard Giraudeau as Isidore
- Odette Laure as Olga
- Claude Gensac as the headmistress
- Marthe Villalonga as the café owner
- Lila Kedrova as Madame de Tocquenville
- Léo Campion
- Zoé Chauveau
- Henri Courseaux
- Michel Elias
- Jacqueline Jefford
- Laurence Masliah
- Daniel Russo
- Robert Rollis
- Jean-François Vlérick

== Production ==
The screenplay was written by Philippe Bourgoin and Éric Le Hung. François D'Aime composed the music, Marcel Combes served as cinematographer, and Guy Belfond was the producer. The film was produced by Axe Films, Peri Productions, Productions Yanne and Victorine Studios.

== Filming locations ==
The film was shot at several locations in Paris, including the Rue de Rivoli, Place du Marché-Sainte-Catherine, Quai des Célestins, Notre-Dame de Paris, the Centre Pompidou and the Palais de Chaillot. Scenes were also filmed at Orly Airport.
