= Breakdown: 1975 =

2025 documentary film

- Directed by: Morgan Neville
- Produced by: Morgan Neville; Lauren Belfer
- Narrated by: Jodie Foster
- Edited by: Alan Lowe; Jody McVeigh-Schultz
- Music by: Daniel Wohl
- Distributed by: Netflix
- Release date: December 19, 2025
- Running time: 92 minutes
- Country: United States
- Language: English

Breakdown: 1975 is a 2025 documentary film directed and produced by Morgan Neville.

== Synopsis ==
The film explores the year 1975 through the lens of American arts and culture.

Actress Jodie Foster, who was part of the New Hollywood era of American cinema during the 1970s, narrates (she would eventually be nominated for the Outstanding Narrator category at the 78th Primetime Creative Arts Emmy Awards).

== Reception ==
On the review aggregator website Rotten Tomatoes, 74% of 23 critics' reviews are positive. Metacritic, which uses a weighted average, assigned the film a score of 49 out of 100, based on six critics, indicating "mixed or average" reviews.

Daniel Fienberg of The Hollywood Reporter wrote

Breakdown: 1975 is packed with great clips and peppered with solid observations, but it's truly an odd documentary — one likely to be enticing for viewers with a casual interest in history or filmmaking, but infuriating for anybody craving even intermediate instruction.

== See also ==
- 1975 in television
- 1975 spring offensive
- List of American films of 1975
