= Lesbian Request Denied =

- Orange Is the New Black episode
- Episode no.: Season 1 Episode 3
- Directed by: Jodie Foster
- Written by: Sian Heder
- Cinematography by: Vanja Cernjul
- Editing by: Tim Boettcher
- Original release date: July 11, 2013
- Running time: 56 minutes

Guest appearances
- Uzo Aduba as Suzanne "Crazy Eyes" Warren; Danielle Brooks as Tasha "Taystee" Jefferson; Laverne Cox as Sophia Burset; Maria Dizzia as Polly Harper; Joel Marsh Garland as Scott O'Neill; Natasha Lyonne as Nicky Nichols; Arden Myrin as Dr. Brooks; Michael Rainey Jr. as Michael Burset; Deborah Rush as Carol Chapman; Morgan Spector as Patrick; Tanya Wright as Crystal Burset; Pablo Schreiber as George "Pornstache" Mendez (special guest star)

Episode chronology
← Previous "Tit Punch"	Next → "Imaginary Enemies"
- Orange Is the New Black (season 1)

"Lesbian Request Denied" is the third episode of the first season of the American comedy-drama series Orange Is the New Black (OITNB), based on Piper Kerman's memoir, Orange Is the New Black: My Year in a Women's Prison (2010), regarding her time at FCI Danbury, a minimum-security federal prison. The episode was released on Netflix on July 11, 2013, along with the rest of the first season. It was written by Sian Heder, and is one of two OITNB episodes directed by actress and filmmaker Jodie Foster.

The episode focuses on Sophia Burset (portrayed by Laverne Cox), a transgender inmate at the fictional prison Litchfield Penitentiary. In flashbacks, Sophia's family adjusts to her transition, while Sophia is arrested for committing credit card fraud to pay for her sex reassignment surgery. In present day, Sophia fights back against the prison reducing her dosage of exogenous estrogen due to budget cuts. In a subplot, new inmate Piper Chapman, played by Taylor Schilling, deals with the romantic overtures of a mentally unstable inmate, Suzanne "Crazy Eyes" Warren, portrayed by Uzo Aduba.

"Lesbian Request Denied" received widespread acclaim from critics, who praised the episode for Foster's direction, the performances of Cox and Aduba, and for its respectful and nuanced treatment of a transgender character, especially in comparison to television's treatment of the transgender community in the past. For the episode, Aduba and Cox both received nominations for the Primetime Emmy Award for Outstanding Guest Actress in a Comedy Series, the former winning the award, while Foster was nominated for the Primetime Emmy Award for Outstanding Directing for a Comedy Series. Cox was the first transgender actress to be nominated for an acting award at the Emmys.

== Plot ==
In flashbacks, Sophia Burset (Laverne Cox), formerly Marcus (M Lamar), a firefighter, pays for her sexual reassignment surgery by stealing credit card information from fire-wrecked houses. Sophia's wife, Crystal (Tanya Wright), while unaware of Sophia's crimes, fully supports her transition, although she requests that Sophia keep her penis so that they can continue to have sex. Sophia's son, Michael (Michael Rainey Jr.), however, is upset by her transition, and, upon discovering her credit card fraud, reports her crime to the police, causing her to be arrested.

In the present day, the prison switches Sophia to generic drugs and halves her dosages of estrogen in order to make up for budget cuts. After attempting to negotiate with prison counselor Healy (Michael J. Harney), she swallows the head of a bobblehead dog in order to see a doctor about her hormone therapy. However, the doctor decides to take Sophia off of hormones altogether, fearing that they are affecting her negatively. After fending off the proposition of prison guard Mendez (Pablo Schreiber) of hormones in exchange for oral sex, Sophia asks Crystal to smuggle in hormones for her; Crystal is disgusted with Sophia, telling her to "man up" for the sake of her wife and her son.

Meanwhile, mentally unstable inmate Suzanne (Uzo Aduba), called "Crazy Eyes", begins stalking Piper (Taylor Schilling). Piper is perturbed by the attention, despite using Suzanne to ward off her ex-girlfriend Alex (Laura Prepon). Piper decides to let Suzanne down easy by informing her about her fiancé. When Piper confronts Alex for "stealing her good life" by naming her in trial, Alex insists that she had no part in her being in prison. Piper decides to ensure this by asking her fiancé, Larry (Jason Biggs), who is dealing with his sexual abstention in Piper's absence, to find out whether Alex named her.

Miss Claudette (Michelle Hurst) receives a new roommate, Janae (Vicky Jeudy), who disrespects her expectations for cleanliness and privacy. Miss Claudette uses her power at the prison to remove Janae from her bunk, resulting in Piper moving into the bunk. Miss Claudette's code of conduct is violated when Suzanne vengefully pees next to Piper's bed.

== Production ==
Explaining how she got involved in the production, Jodie Foster said, "I read the book [Orange Is the New Black: My Year in a Women's Prison] and I said to my agent, 'Oh man, I really want to do this.' He was like, 'Well, [the showrunner is] Jenji Kohan!' And I was like, 'Would you please pass along that I'd like to be a part of this?' Then eventually I found out a friend of mine was doing prep work for the show, and I told her, 'Please tell the writer [Piper Kerman] I love that book and I'm dying to do something.' Then that's what happened. They don't tell you what episode you're shooting so it's a wonderful exercise and meditation in letting go because you have no idea what you're doing. One episode takes eight days to prep and eight to shoot. It's a fast deal. And I'd never done TV before."

Series creator and showrunner Jenji Kohan stated that Foster directed the episode as "sort of her dry-run for when she does her television thing", referencing an as-of-yet unrealized project for Showtime Foster was to spearhead. When asked about Foster's merits as a TV director, Kohan said, "Movie directing is different from TV directing and I think some things were like a culture shock for her because, in way, you know the director's not the king in TV. It's more collaborative with the writers than she's used to...That said? She was incredibly collaborative and really game and came in saying, 'I haven't done this before. It's a learning curve.'"

Cox initially wanted to play Sophia pre-transition as well, but was dissuaded by Foster, explaining, “I was like, ‘I have to butch it up,’ because I don't think Jodie believed that I could pull this off. I go to Jodie and she looks at me and she's like, ‘We’re gonna have to hire someone.’ Jodie Foster didn't think I looked masculine enough to play a guy.” Cox said that several "really butch black men" auditioned for the part before “our casting director found out that I have a twin brother [M Lamar]...He auditioned, and he got the part.”

Speaking about the scene in which Sophia's wife, Crystal, gives her advice on clothing, Foster said, "That was the toughest day of the shoot. It was like, 'How am I going to accomplish this?' I love to shoot fast because I prep like an insane person. But that scene was so incredibly long. It's two people talking. And in order to work with [looking in the] mirror and the kissing -- all those different beats were extremely challenging. It was the hardest day for acting by far. I loved their performances and the subtlety of the things that aren't said. Laverne really brought it home. I'm so proud!"

== Reception ==
=== Critical reception ===
"Lesbian Request Denied" received critical acclaim. Myles McNutt, reviewing the episode for The A.V. Club, awarded the episode an "A", the highest grade on the site, calling it "a brilliant example of how the series’ flashbacks can transform our understanding of these characters". McNutt noted that "On a lesser show, Sophia’s role as “The transsexual to whom Piper sold her hair for a weave” would have remained “The transsexual to whom Piper sold her hair for a weave,” but here the character is elevated above Piper for a week as we learn Sophia's own story of becoming."

Amy Amatangelo of Paste rated the episode 8.9 out of 10, repeating McNutt's point that "on the surface, we've all seen a TV character like Sophia before (probably on a crime drama sassing a detective), but Orange delved deep to show us a complicated and fascinating woman". Amatangelo also praised the scenes between Piper and Suzanne, as "they effortlessly flowed between comic relief and terror."

Danielle Henderson of Vulture gave the episode four out of five stars, stating that she was "ready to base [her] whole view of the show on how [Sophia] was treated, knowing that few people writing for television know what to do with (a) women, (b) black women and certainly not (c) black transgender women"; she called Sophia's backstory "heartbreaking". Henderson also praised the characters of Ms. Claudette and Nicky, calling them "fun" and "scene-stealing", respectively, while criticizing Piper and Larry for "living in the no longer useful framework of... Waspy obliviousness".

=== Awards and nominations ===
Date	Awards Ceremony	Category	Recipient(s)	Result	Ref.
February 1, 2014	66th Writers Guild of America Awards	Best Episodic Comedy	Sian Heder	Nominated	
August 25, 2014	66th Primetime Emmy Awards	Outstanding Guest Actress in a Comedy Series	Laverne Cox	Nominated	
August 25, 2014	66th Primetime Emmy Awards	Outstanding Guest Actress in a Comedy Series	Uzo Aduba	Won	
August 25, 2014	66th Primetime Emmy Awards	Outstanding Directing for a Comedy Series	Jodie Foster	Nominated	
