= The Baby Dance =

1998 American television film

- Based on: The Baby Dance by Jane Anderson
- Written by: Jane Anderson
- Directed by: Jane Anderson
- Starring: Stockard Channing; Laura Dern
- Music by: Terry Allen
- Country of origin: United States
- Original language: English

Production
- Producers: Jodie Foster; Vicky Herman; Meg LeFauve
- Cinematography: Jan Kiesser
- Editor: Norman Buckley
- Running time: 95 minutes

Original release
- Network: Showtime
- Release: August 23, 1998

The Baby Dance is a 1998 American television drama film about adoption. The film premiered on Showtime on August 23, 1998. It was written and directed by Jane Anderson, based on her play of the same name, with Stockard Channing and Laura Dern starring in the lead roles.

== Plot ==
Wanda LeFauve is a poor mother of four with an unemployed husband living in a trailer outside Shreveport, Louisiana. Pregnant again, she finds a newspaper ad placed by a couple hoping to adopt a newborn. Summoning up her courage, Wanda makes the telephone call. The couple—Rachel and Richard Luckman—are wealthy, Jewish urbanites from Los Angeles. They skirt logistics, legal matters, fears and prejudices prior to the child's birth.

== Cast ==
- Stockard Channing as Rachel Luckman
- Laura Dern as Wanda LeFauve
- Peter Riegert as Richard Luckman
- Richard Lineback as Al LeFauve
- Sandra Seacat as Doreen

== Awards ==
The film was nominated for the Golden Globe Awards for Best Miniseries or Television Film and Best Actress – Miniseries or Television Film for both Dern and Channing.

At the Primetime Emmy Awards, the film was nominated for Outstanding Television Movie, Outstanding Lead Actress in a Limited Series or Movie for Stockard Channing and directing and writing for Jane Anderson.

The film received the prestigious Peabody Award. Channing was also nominated for the Independent Spirit Award for Best Supporting Female and the Screen Actors Guild Award for Outstanding Performance by a Female Actor in a Miniseries or Television Movie.
