= 46th Golden Globe Awards =

Film award ceremony in 1989

- Date: January 28, 1989
- Site: Beverly Hilton Hotel; Beverly Hills, Los Angeles, California
- Hosted by: George Hamilton; Joan Collins

Highlights
- Best Film: Drama: Rain Man
- Best Film: Musical or Comedy: Working Girl
- Best Drama Series: Thirtysomething
- Best Musical or Comedy Series: The Wonder Years
- Most awards: (4) Working Girl
- Most nominations: (6) Working Girl

Television coverage
- Network: SuperStation TBS

The 46th Golden Globe Awards, honoring the best in film and television for 1988, were held on January 28, 1989, at the Beverly Hilton and was televised in the United States by SuperStation TBS. This marked the first time the awards show aired exclusively on cable after six years on broadcast syndication. The nominations were announced on January 4, 1989.

== Winners and nominees ==
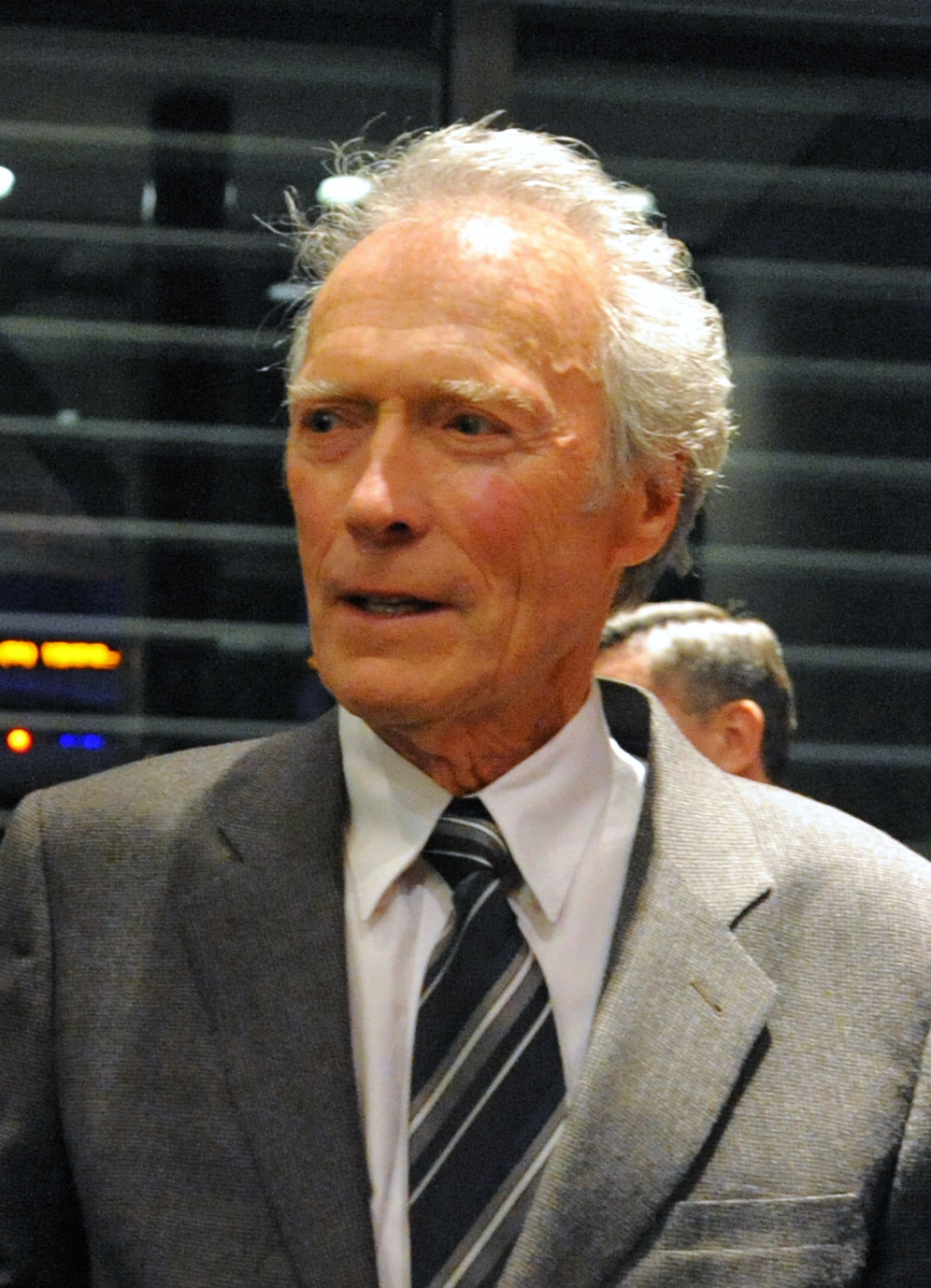
Clint Eastwood — Best Director

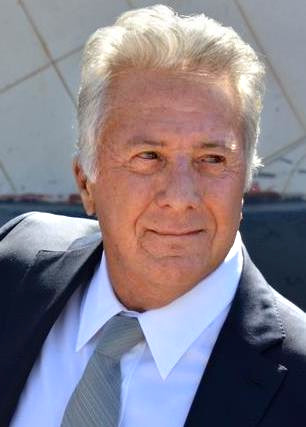
Dustin Hoffman — Best Actor in a Motion Picture, Drama

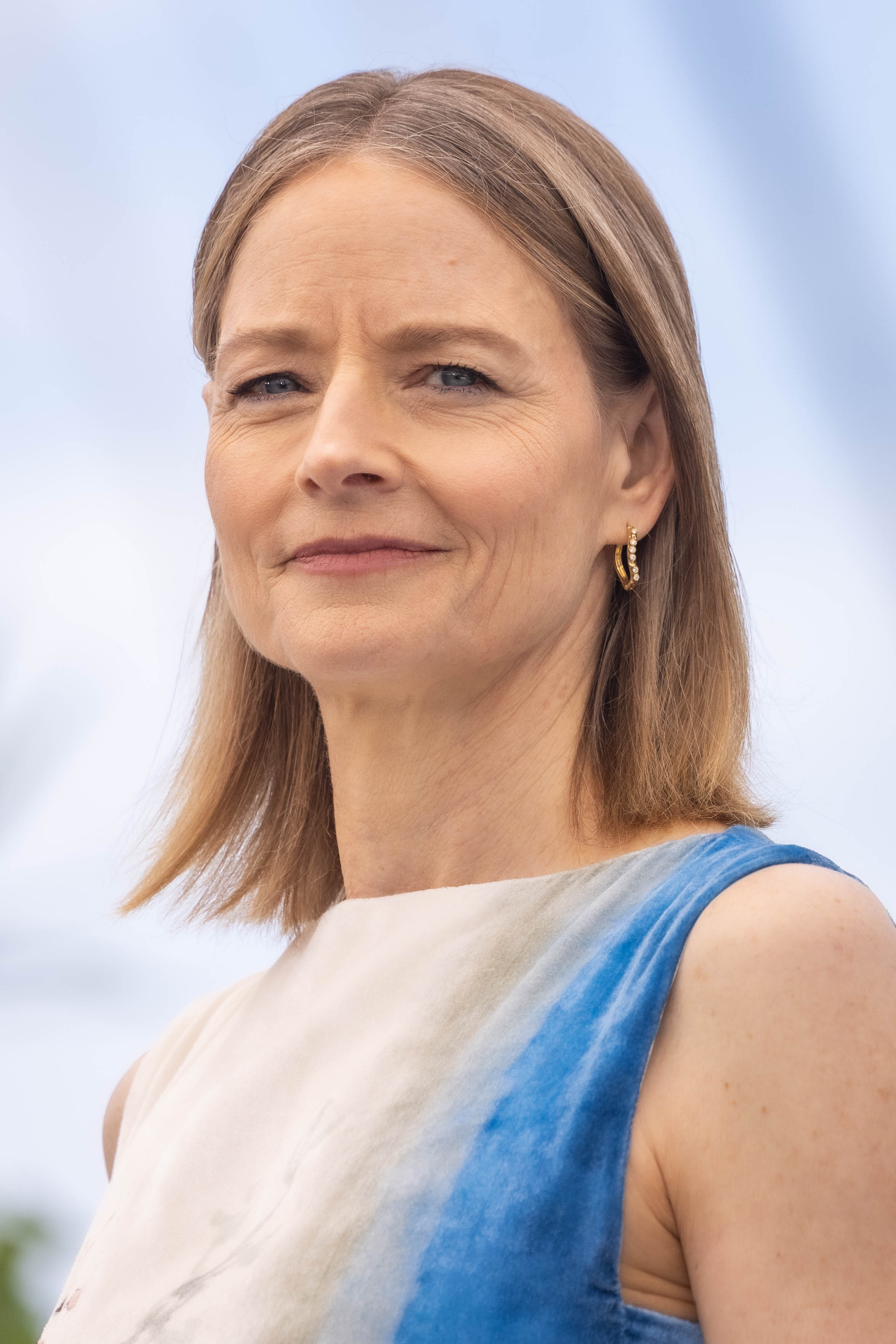
Jodie Foster — Best Actress in a Motion Picture, Drama

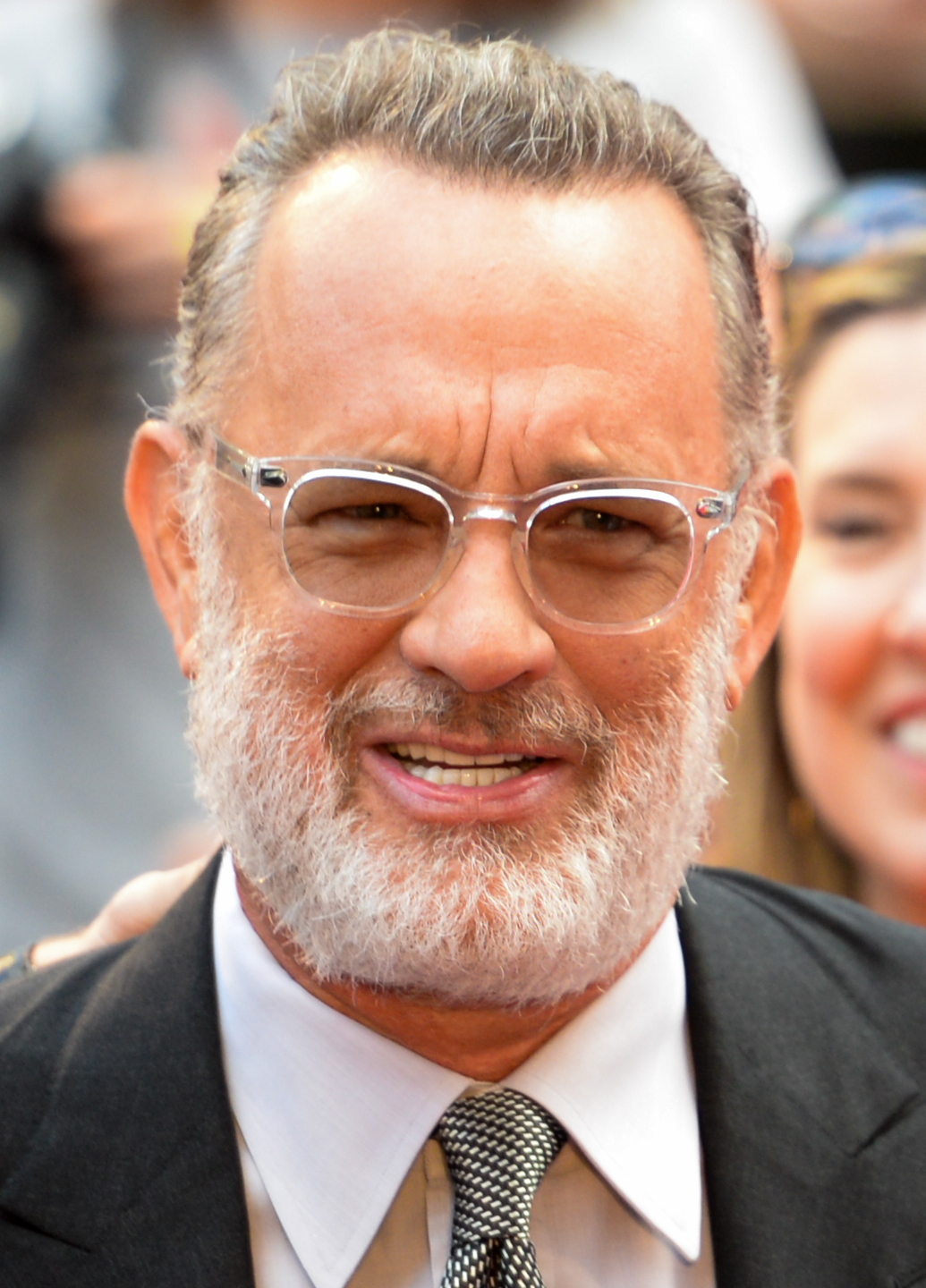
Tom Hanks — Best Actor in a Motion Picture, Musical or Comedy

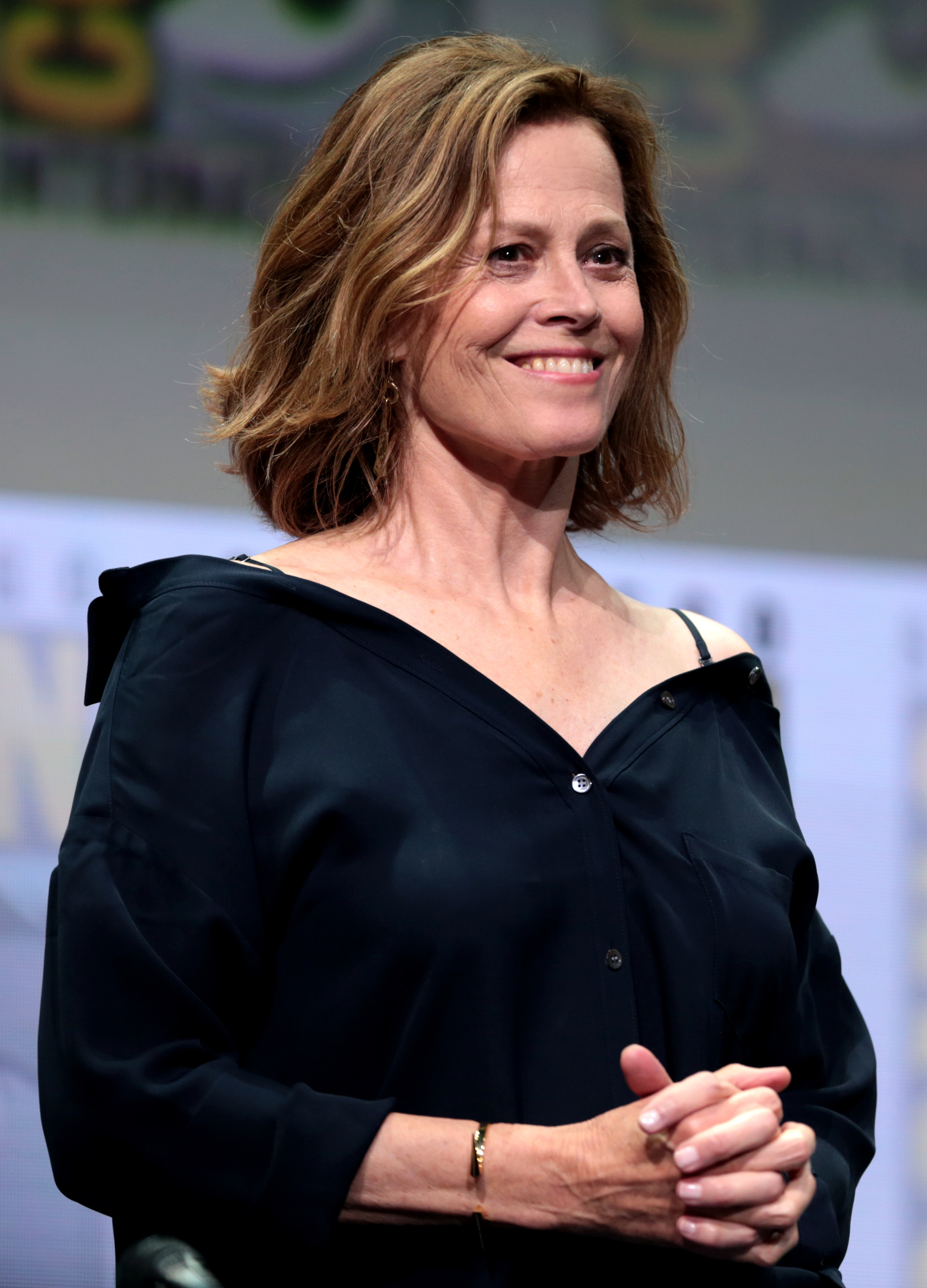
Sigourney Weaver — Best Actress and Best Supporting Actress in a Motion Picture Drama, Musical or Comedy (first actress to win two Globes in same year)

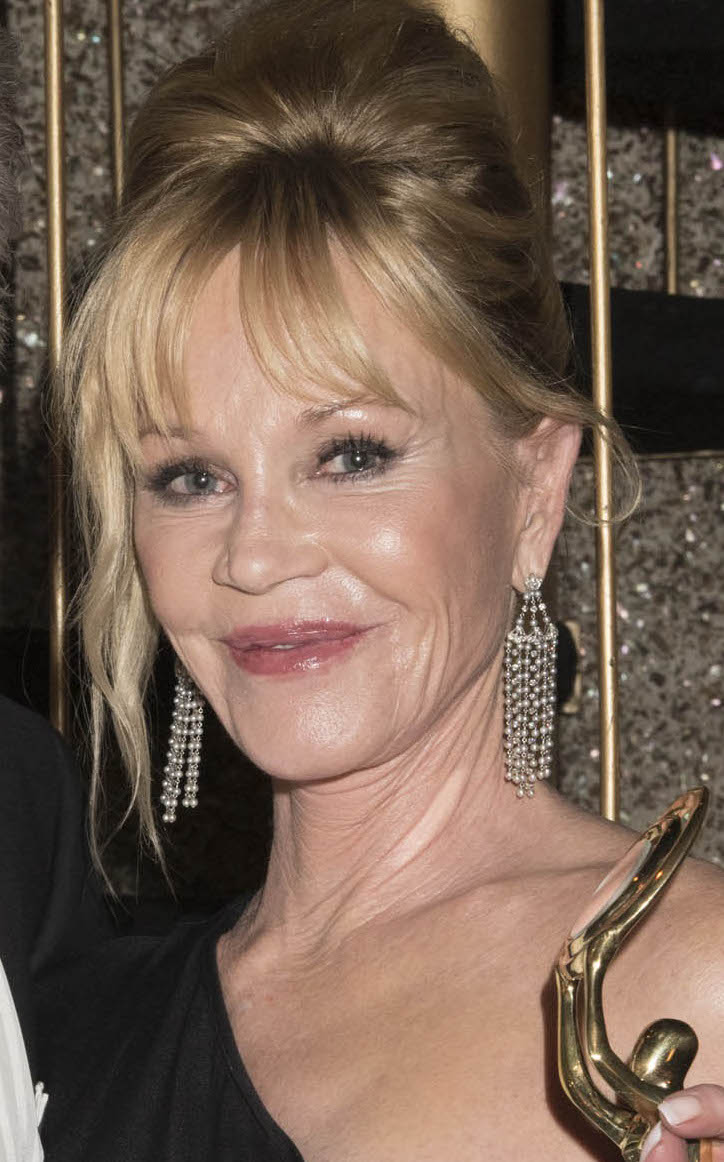
Melanie Griffith — Best Actress in a Motion Picture, Musical or Comedy

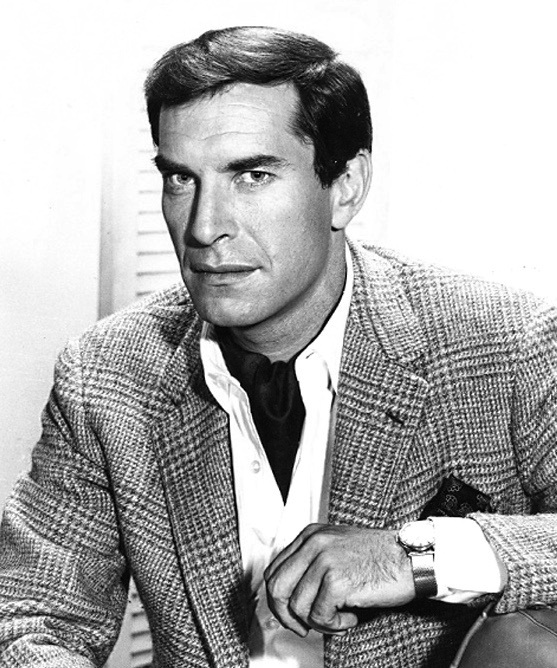
Martin Landau — Best Supporting Actor in a Motion Picture Drama, Musical or Comedy

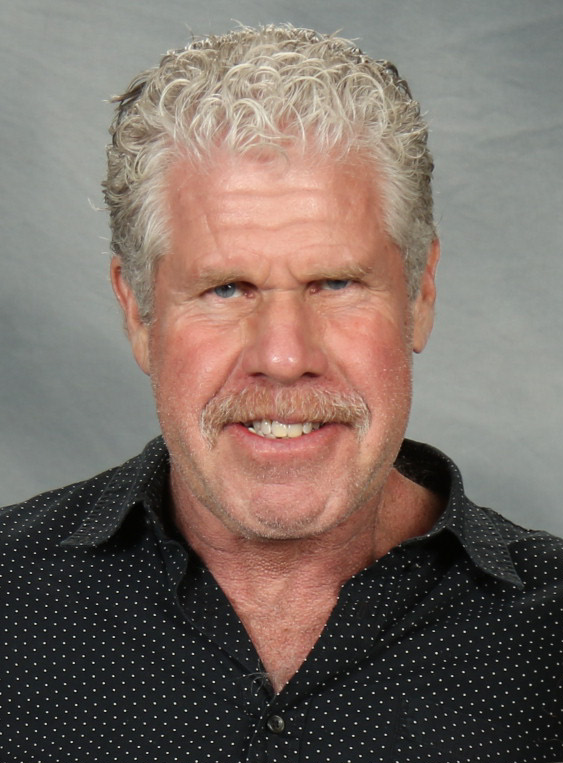
Ron Perlman — Best Actor in a Television Series, Drama

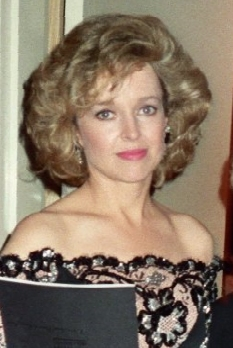
Jill Eikenberry — Best Actress in a Television Series, Drama

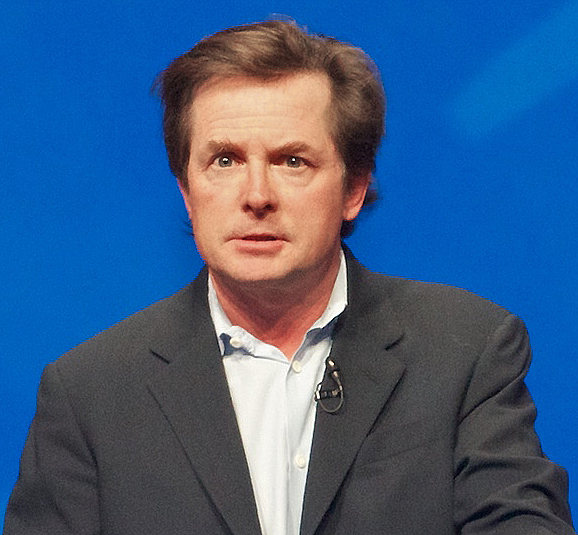
Michael J. Fox — Best Actor in a Television Series, Musical or Comedy

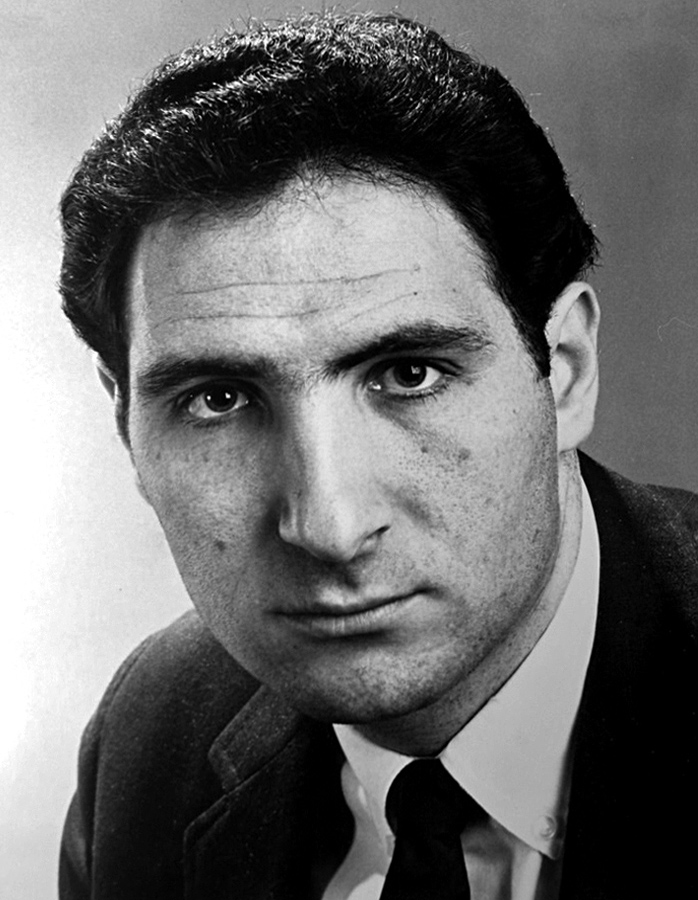
Judd Hirsch — Best Actor in a Television Series, Musical or Comedy

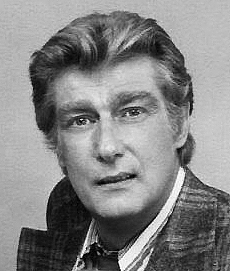
Richard Mulligan — Best Actor in a Television Series, Musical or Comedy

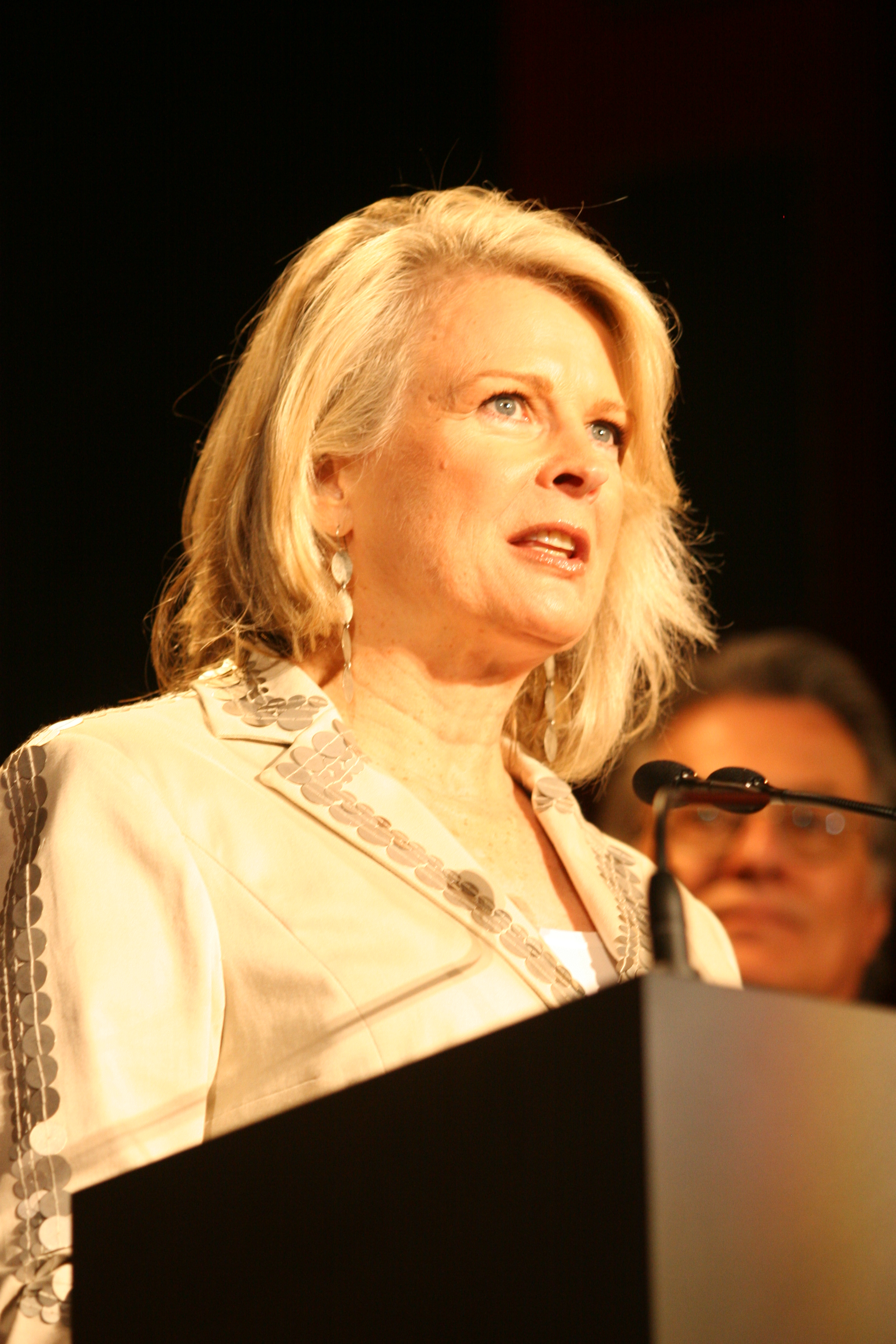
Candice Bergen — Best Actress in a Television Series, Musical or Comedy

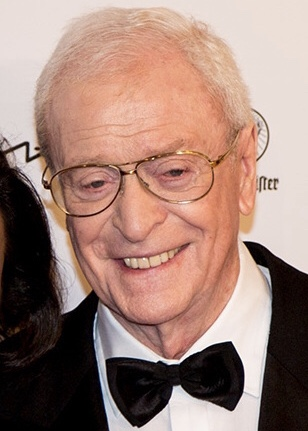
Michael Caine — Best Actor in a Miniseries or Television Film

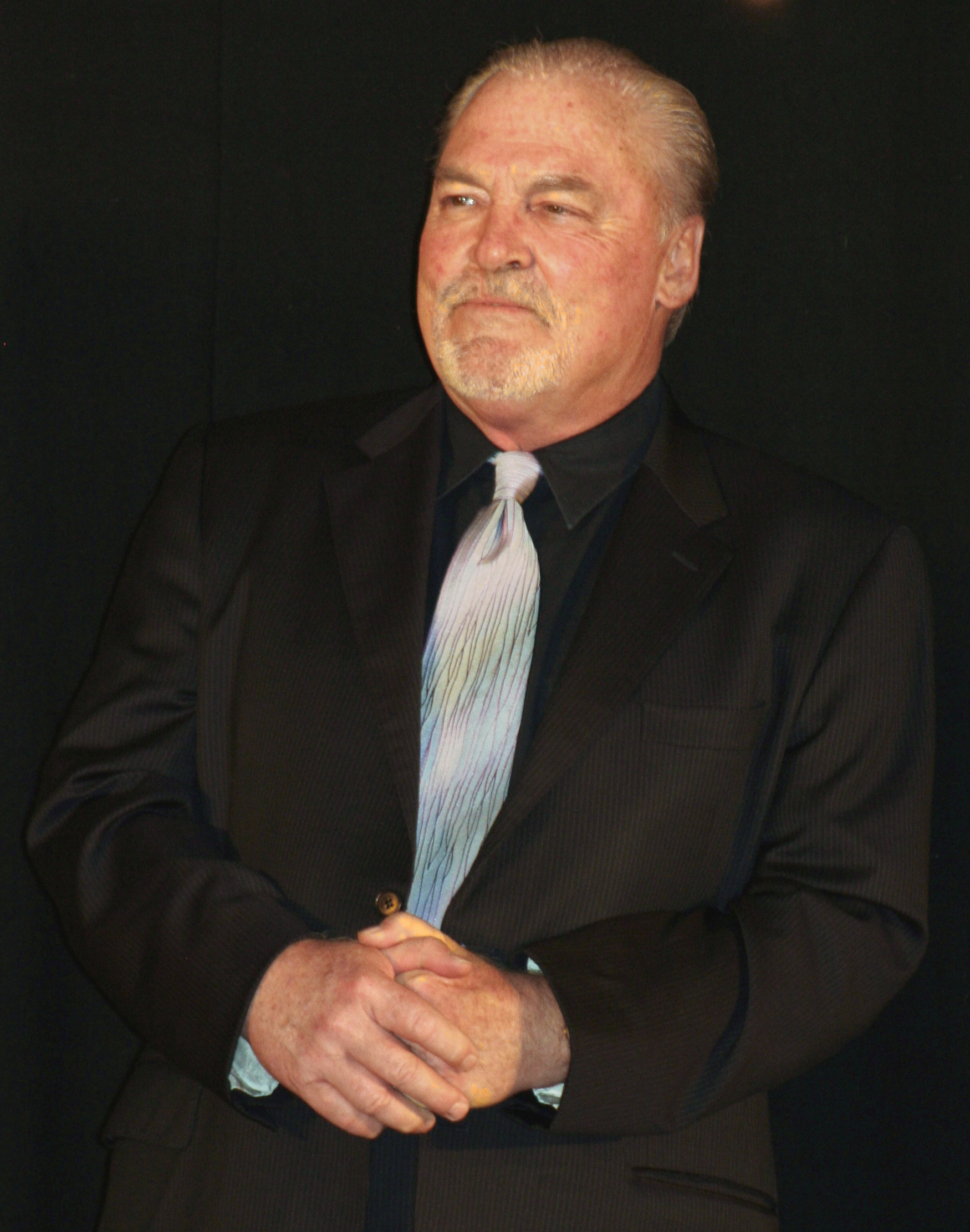
Stacy Keach — Best Actor in a Miniseries or Television Film

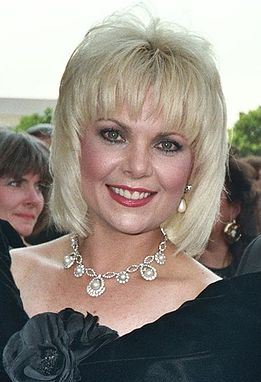
Ann Jillian — Best Actress in a Miniseries or Television Film

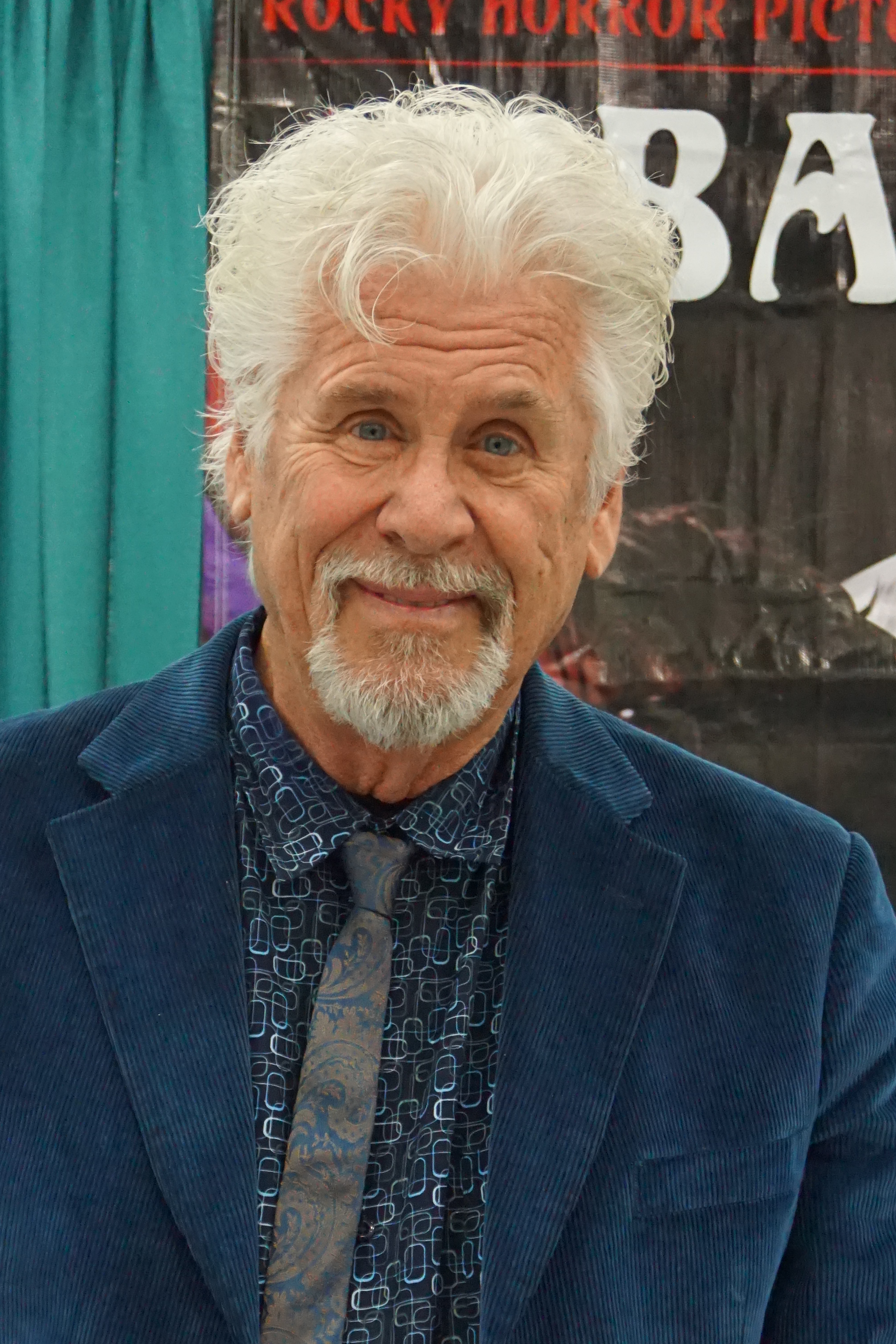
Barry Bostwick — Best Supporting Actor in a Series, Miniseries or Motion Picture Made for Television

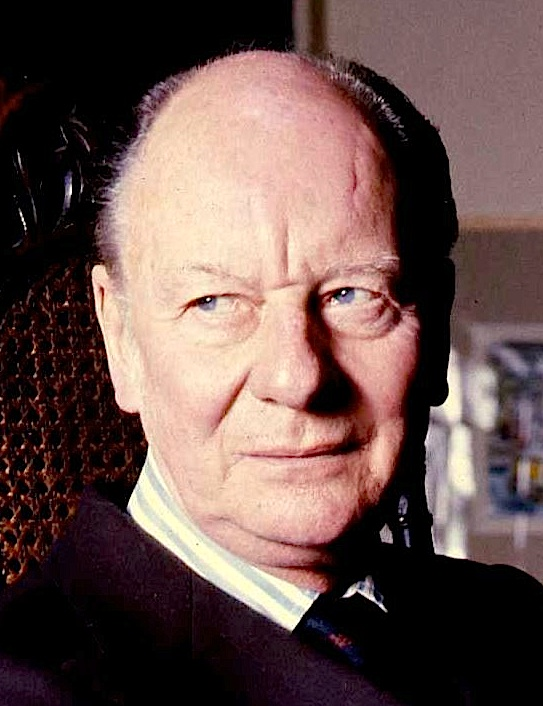
John Gielgud — Best Supporting Actor in a Series, Miniseries or Motion Picture Made for Television

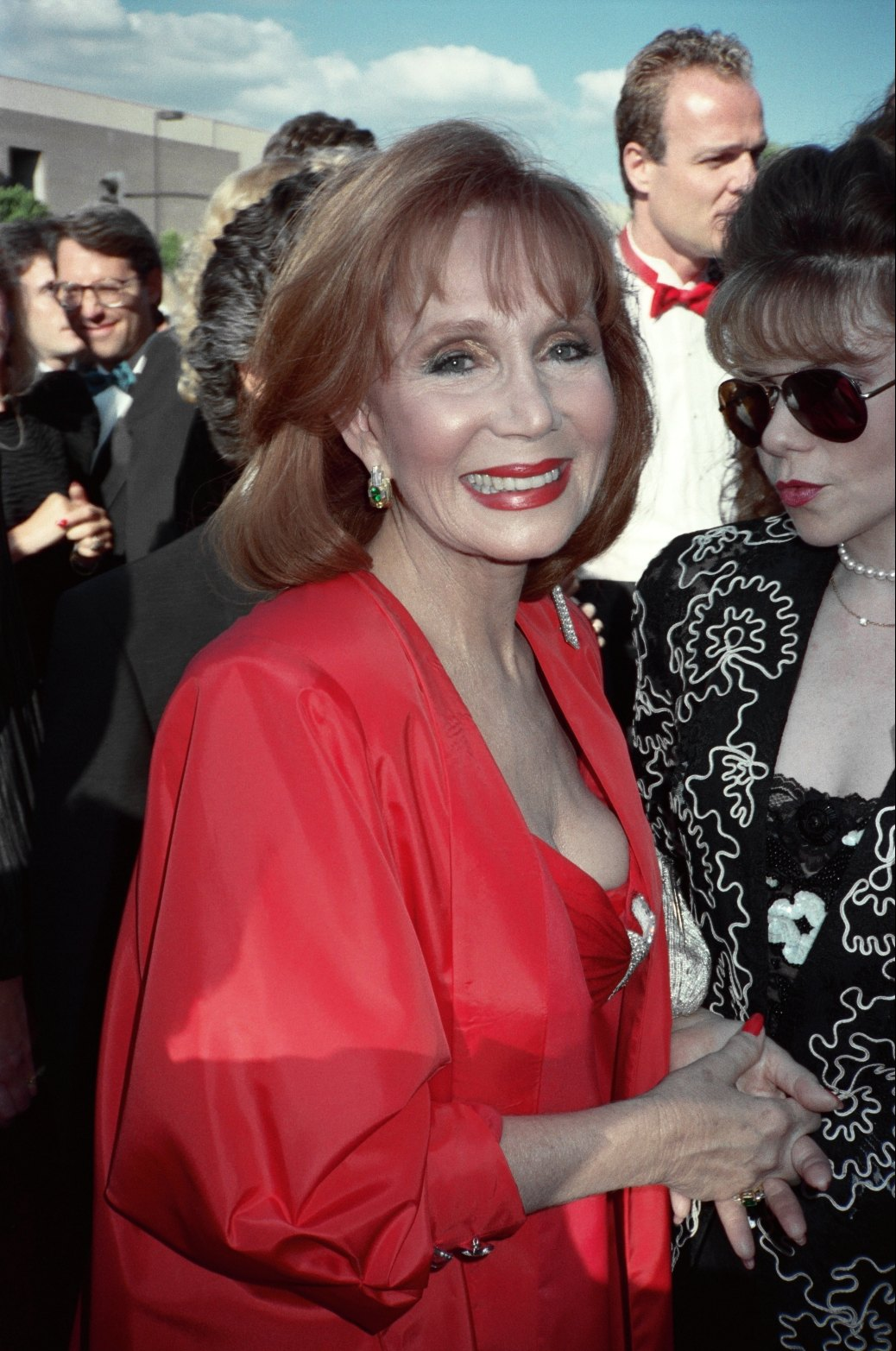
Katherine Helmond — Best Supporting Actress in a Series, Miniseries or Motion Picture Made for Television

=== Film ===
Best Motion Picture
Drama	Comedy or Musical
Rain Man; The Accidental Tourist; Evil Angels (A Cry in the Dark); Gorillas in the Mist; Mississippi Burning; Running on Empty; The Unbearable Lightness of Being	Working Girl; Big; A Fish Called Wanda; Midnight Run; Who Framed Roger Rabbit
Best Performance in a Motion Picture – Drama
Actor	Actress
Dustin Hoffman – Rain Man as Raymond Babbit; Gene Hackman – Mississippi Burning as Agent Rupert Anderson; Tom Hulce – Dominick and Eugene as Dominick Luciano; Edward James Olmos – Stand and Deliver as Jaime Escalante; Forest Whitaker – Bird as Charlie "Bird" Parker	Unusually, there was a three-way tie for this award.: Jodie Foster – The Accused as Sarah Tobias; Shirley MacLaine – Madame Sousatzka as Madame Sousatzka; Sigourney Weaver – Gorillas in the Mist as Dian Fossey; Christine Lahti – Running on Empty as Annie Pope; Meryl Streep – Evil Angels (A Cry in the Dark) as Lindy Chamberlain
Best Performance in a Motion Picture – Comedy or Musical
Actor	Actress
Tom Hanks – Big as Josh Baskin; Michael Caine – Dirty Rotten Scoundrels as Lawrence Jamieson; John Cleese – A Fish Called Wanda as Archie Leach; Robert De Niro – Midnight Run as Jack Walsh; Bob Hoskins – Who Framed Roger Rabbit as Eddie Valiant	Melanie Griffith – Working Girl as Tess McGill; Jamie Lee Curtis – A Fish Called Wanda as Wanda Gershwitz; Amy Irving – Crossing Delancey as Isabelle Grossman; Michelle Pfeiffer – Married to the Mob as Angela de Marco; Susan Sarandon – Bull Durham as Annie Savoy
Best Supporting Performance in a Motion Picture
Supporting Actor	Supporting Actress
Martin Landau – Tucker: The Man and His Dream as Abe Karatz; Alec Guinness – Little Dorrit as William Dorrit; Neil Patrick Harris – Clara's Heart as David Hart; Raul Julia – Moon over Parador as Roberto Strausmann; Lou Diamond Phillips – Stand and Deliver as Angel Guzman; River Phoenix – Running on Empty as Danny Pope	Sigourney Weaver – Working Girl as Katharine Parker; Sônia Braga – Moon over Parador as Madonna Mendez; Barbara Hershey – The Last Temptation of Christ as Mary Magdalene; Lena Olin – The Unbearable Lightness of Being as Sabina; Diane Venora – Bird as Chan Parker
Other
Best Director	Best Screenplay
Clint Eastwood – Bird; Barry Levinson – Rain Man; Sidney Lumet – Running on Empty; Mike Nichols – Working Girl; Alan Parker – Mississippi Burning; Fred Schepisi – Evil Angels (A Cry in the Dark)	Running on Empty – Naomi Foner; Evil Angels (A Cry in the Dark) – Robert Caswell and Fred Schepisi; Mississippi Burning – Chris Gerolmo; Rain Man – Ronald Bass and Barry Morrow; Working Girl – Kevin Wade
Best Original Score	Best Original Song
Gorillas in the Mist – Maurice Jarre; The Accidental Tourist – John Williams; The Last Temptation of Christ – Peter Gabriel; Madame Sousatzka – Gerald Gouriet; The Milagro Beanfield War – Dave Grusin	"Two Hearts" (Phil Collins and Lamont Dozier) – Buster; "Let the River Run" (Carly Simon) – Working Girl; "When a Woman Loves a Man" (Bernard Hanighen, Gordon Jenkins and Johnny Mercer) – Bull Durham; "Kokomo" (Mike Love, Terry Melcher, John Phillips and Scott McKenzie) – Cocktail; "Why Should I Worry?" (Dan Hartman and Charlie Midnight) – Oliver & Company; "Twins" (Skip Scarborough and Lorrin Bates) – Twins
Best Foreign Language Film
Pelle the Conqueror (Pelle erobreren) (Denmark); Babette's Feast (Babettes gæstebud) (Denmark); Hanussen (West Germany); Salaam Bombay! (India); Women on the Verge of a Nervous Breakdown (Mujeres al borde de un ataque de nervios) (Spain)

The following films received multiple nominations:

Nominations	Title
6	Working Girl
5	Running on Empty
4	Evil Angels (A Cry in the Dark)
4	Mississippi Burning
4	Rain Man
3	Bird
3	A Fish Called Wanda
3	Gorillas in the Mist
2	The Accidental Tourist
2	Big
2	Bull Durham
2	The Last Temptation of Christ
2	Madame Sousatzka
2	Midnight Run
2	Moon over Parador
2	Stand and Deliver
2	The Unbearable Lightness of Being
2	Who Framed Roger Rabbit

The following films received multiple wins:

Wins	Title
4	Working Girl
2	Gorillas in the Mist
2	Rain Man

=== Television ===
Best Television Series
Drama	Musical or Comedy
thirtysomething; Beauty and the Beast; L.A. Law; Murder, She Wrote; Wiseguy	The Wonder Years; Cheers; The Golden Girls; Murphy Brown; Roseanne
Best Performance in a Television Series – Drama
Actor	Actress
Ron Perlman – Beauty and the Beast as Vincent; Corbin Bernsen – L.A. Law as Arnie Becker; Harry Hamlin – L.A. Law as Michael Kuzak; Carroll O'Connor – In the Heat of the Night as William O. "Bill" Gillespie; Ken Wahl – Wiseguy as Vinnie Terranova	Jill Eikenberry – L.A. Law as Ann Kelsey; Susan Dey – L.A. Law as Grace Van Owen; Sharon Gless – Cagney & Lacey as Christine Cagney; Linda Hamilton – Beauty and the Beast as Catherine Chandler; Angela Lansbury – Murder, She Wrote as Jessica Fletcher
Best Performance in a Television Series – Musical or Comedy
Actor	Actress
Michael J. Fox – Family Ties as Alex P. Keaton; Judd Hirsch – Dear John as John Lacey; Richard Mulligan – Empty Nest as Dr. Harry Weston; Ted Danson – Cheers as Sam Malone; Tony Danza – Who's the Boss? as Tony Micelli; John Goodman – Roseanne as Dan Conner	Candice Bergen – Murphy Brown as Murphy Brown; Beatrice Arthur – The Golden Girls as Dorothy Zbornak; Roseanne – Roseanne as Roseanne Conner; Tracey Ullman – The Tracey Ullman Show as various characters; Betty White – The Golden Girls as Rose Nylund
Best Performance in a Miniseries or Television Film
Actor	Actress
Michael Caine – Jack the Ripper as Frederick Abberline; Stacy Keach – Hemingway as Ernest Hemingway; Richard Chamberlain – The Bourne Identity as Jason Bourne; Anthony Hopkins – The Tenth Man as Chavel; Jack Lemmon – The Murder of Mary Phagan as Gov. John M. Slaton	Ann Jillian – The Ann Jillian Story as herself; Vanessa Redgrave – A Man for All Seasons as Alice More; Jane Seymour – War and Remembrance as Natalie Henry; Jane Seymour – The Woman He Loved as Wallis Simpson; JoBeth Williams – Baby M as Mary Beth Whitehead
Best Supporting Performance - Series, Miniseries or Television Film
Supporting Actor	Supporting Actress
Barry Bostwick – War and Remembrance as Carter "Lady" Aster; John Gielgud – War and Remembrance as Aaron Jastrow; Armand Assante – Jack the Ripper as Richard Mansfield; Kirk Cameron – Growing Pains as Michael Aaron "Mike" Seaver; Larry Drake – L.A. Law as Benny Stulwicz; Derek Jacobi – The Tenth Man as The Imposter; Edward James Olmos – Miami Vice as Martin "Marty" Castillo	Katherine Helmond – Who's the Boss? as Mona Robinson; Jackée Harry – 227 as Sandra Clark; Swoosie Kurtz – Baja Oklahoma as Doris Steadman; Rhea Perlman – Cheers as Carla Tortelli; Susan Ruttan – L.A. Law as Roxanne Melman
Best Miniseries or Television Film
War and Remembrance; Hemingway; Jack the Ripper; The Murder of Mary Phagan; The Tenth Man

The following programs received multiple nominations:

Nominations	Title
7	L.A. Law
4	War and Remembrance
3	Beauty and the Beast
3	Cheers
3	The Golden Girls
3	Jack the Ripper
3	Roseanne
3	The Tenth Man
2	Hemingway
2	The Murder of Mary Phagan
2	Murder, She Wrote
2	Who's the Boss?
2	Wiseguy
2	Murphy Brown

The following programs received multiple wins:

Wins	Title
3	War and Remembrance

== Ceremony ==
=== Presenters ===
- Anne Archer
- James Brolin
- Phil Collins
- Michael Douglas
- Clint Eastwood
- Valeria Golino
- Linda Gray
- Harry Hamlin
- Dennis Hopper
- Shelley Long
- Carrie Mitchum
- Christopher Mitchum
- Robert Mitchum
- Randy Quaid
- Eric Roberts
- Gena Rowlands
- Peter Strauss
- Richard Widmark

=== Cecil B. DeMille Award ===
Doris Day

=== Miss Golden Globe ===
Kyle Atletter (daughter to Frank Aletter & Lee Meriwether)

== See also ==
- 61st Academy Awards
- 9th Golden Raspberry Awards
- 40th Primetime Emmy Awards
- 41st Primetime Emmy Awards
- 42nd British Academy Film Awards
- 43rd Tony Awards
- 1988 in film
- 1988 in American television
