= Running on Empty (1988 film) =

1988 American drama film by Sidney Lumet

- Theatrical release poster
- Directed by: Sidney Lumet
- Written by: Naomi Foner
- Produced by: Amy Robinson; Griffin Dunne
- Starring: Christine Lahti; Judd Hirsch; Martha Plimpton; River Phoenix; Steven Hill
- Cinematography: Gerry Fisher
- Edited by: Andrew Mondshein
- Music by: Tony Mottola
- Production companies: Lorimar Film Entertainment; Double Play
- Distributed by: Warner Bros. Pictures
- Release date: September 9, 1988
- Running time: 116 minutes
- Country: United States
- Language: English
- Budget: $7 million
- Box office: $2.8 million

Running on Empty is a 1988 American drama film starring River Phoenix, Judd Hirsch, Christine Lahti, and Martha Plimpton. It was directed by Sidney Lumet, written by Naomi Foner, and produced by Lorimar Film Entertainment. It is the story of a counterculture couple on the run from the FBI, and how their eldest son starts to break free of the family's fugitive lifestyle.

Running on Empty received two nominations at the 61st Academy Awards (Best Supporting Actor for Phoenix and Best Original Screenplay for Foner) and five nominations at the 46th Golden Globe Awards, winning Best Screenplay. Plimpton was nominated for a Young Artist Award for Best Young Actress in a Motion Picture.

== Plot ==
In the 1980s, Annie and Arthur Pope are a married couple who are fugitives from justice. They were responsible for an anti-Vietnam War protest bombing of a napalm laboratory in 1971. The bomb accidentally blinded and paralyzed a janitor who was not supposed to be in the building at the time. Rather than turn themselves in and face likely prison sentences, the Popes have been on the run ever since, relying on an underground network of supporters who help them financially. When the bombing occurred, their son Danny was two years old. As the film begins, he is seventeen, and the Pope family, now with younger son Harry, have relocated to the New Jersey town of Waterford and assumed new identities.

Danny's outstanding talent as a pianist catches the attention of his high school music teacher Mr. Phillips, who pushes his prize student to audition for Juilliard. Phillips begins probing into the background of "Michael Manfield" (the alias being used by Danny), and questions why the young man has no academic transcripts available from a prior school. Meanwhile, Danny and the teacher's teenage daughter Lorna fall in love.

As the pressure to have his own independent life intensifies, Danny reveals his family secret to Lorna. Annie learns from Phillips about Danny's Juilliard audition. She too was once a promising musician, and she comes to terms with the fact that she must let her son go to pursue his dreams. This does not sit well with Arthur, even as Annie risks their safety to contact her estranged father about arranging a home for Danny in New York City, if the Popes should decide to leave him behind.

When Annie finds out the FBI is searching for one of their underground comrades, Gus Winant, as a suspect in a recent bank robbery in the area, she fears the FBI could be closing in on her and Arthur as well. The Popes hastily prepare to depart Waterford. After Arthur hears a radio news bulletin that Gus has been killed while attempting to flee from the authorities, he finally accepts that it is better for Danny to start his own life than to continue this dangerous existence on the run from a crime for which he bears no responsibility. And so Arthur, along with Annie and Harry, say goodbye to Danny and head off for their next identity in a new town.

== Cast ==
- River Phoenix as Danny Pope
- Christine Lahti as Annie Pope
- Judd Hirsch as Arthur Pope
- Jonas Abry as Harry Pope
- Martha Plimpton as Lorna Phillips
- Ed Crowley as Mr. Phillips (Lorna's father)
- Steven Hill as Donald Patterson (Annie's father)
- Augusta Dabney as Abigail Patterson (Annie's mother)
- L. M. Kit Carson as Gus Winant
- David Margulies as Dr. Jonah Reiff
- Lynne Thigpen as Contact at Eldridge St.
- Marcia Jean Kurtz as School Clerk
- Sloane Shelton as Mrs. Phillips (Lorna's mother)
- Ronnie Gilbert as Mrs. Taylor

== Background ==
Producers Amy Robinson and Griffin Dunne said the idea for the film began in the early 1980s after they read a newspaper story about the arrest of two fugitive radicals in upstate New York: "What caught their attention was the comments of neighbors about how normal and polite their children appeared to be." Working with screenwriter Naomi Foner, they opted to tell the story from the children's viewpoint.

Foner interviewed people who had lived underground, and incorporated details she learned into the script. The interviewees included a former Columbia University classmate who went into hiding in 1969 with the radical group Weather Underground. When the classmate resurfaced in the 1980s, she told Foner of hardships faced trying to raise two children while in hiding. According to Politico's Jeffrey Ressner, Arthur and Annie Pope were loosely modeled after Weather Underground leaders Bill Ayers and Bernardine Dohrn. John Simon stated that the characters' bombing of a napalm research facility was inspired by the Sterling Hall bombing of 1970.

In his book Making Movies (1995), Sidney Lumet summarized the theme of Running on Empty as "Who pays for the passions and commitments of the parents?" He likened the theme to that of his 1983 film Daniel about one of the sons of Julius and Ethel Rosenberg. In Film Comment, Foner said an underlying message of Running on Empty is that "you have to learn to really love people in such a way that you can let them be who they are, let them go when they need to go."

== Production ==
Lumet believed that his most important casting decision was choosing Christine Lahti for the role of Annie Pope. Next, he cast River Phoenix and Martha Plimpton to portray the teenage romantic interests; they had previously co-starred in The Mosquito Coast (1986).

Lumet related an anecdote from the making of Running on Empty that illustrated what he termed the "selflessness" of Naomi Foner in allowing changes to her script. He referred to a scene in which Danny Pope/Michael Manfield visits the Phillips' house for the first time. While waiting alone in the living room, he notices an elegant piano; he sits down and begins to play a Beethoven sonata. Eventually he senses he is being watched by Phillips' daughter Lorna, and he segues into boogie-woogie piano music:

I explained to Naomi why I thought it was a bad idea. There was a feeling of pandering to an audience. See, he's not really an egghead—he likes jazz, just like you and me.... Naomi fought for it, so I decided to leave it in to see how it played in rehearsal. When I began to stage the scene, River asked if we could cut that bit. He felt false playing it. I saw Naomi pale. We started to talk about it. River told Naomi with great simplicity and earnestness how it compromised his character. (It was enchanting to see this seventeen-year-old arguing with a serious writer twice his age.) Finally, I suggested we try it for a few days to see if there was a value to it. At the end of rehearsal, Naomi came over to me. She said she didn't mind if I had to stretch to accommodate the scene, but she couldn't bear to see River turning himself inside out to make it work. She loved the scene, but she said, "Let's cut it."

During the filming of the birthday party scene in Empire Studios in Long Island City, Queens, Judd Hirsch suddenly felt that the Pope family had become real: "The joy struck everybody at the same time. I realized I had bought into the movie."

== Reception ==
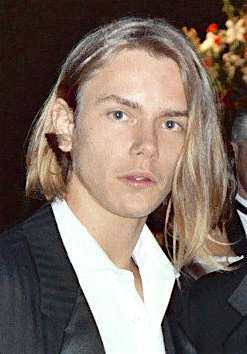
River Phoenix's performance received critical acclaim, earning the 18-year-old a nomination for the Academy Award for Best Supporting Actor, becoming the sixth-youngest nominee in the category.

=== Box office ===
Running on Empty was released on September 9, 1988, in 22 theaters, where it grossed $215,157 on its opening weekend. It went on to make $2,835,116 in North America.

=== Critical reception ===
Film critic Roger Ebert gave the film four out of four stars and called it "one of the best films of the year". In her review for The New York Times, Janet Maslin wrote, "The courtship between Danny and Lorna is staged especially disarmingly, with Mr. Phoenix and Miss Plimpton conveying a sweet, serious and believably gradual attraction." Newsweek magazine's David Ansen wrote, "A curious mix of soap opera and social history, Lumet's film shouldn't work, yet its fusion of oddly matched parts proves emotionally overpowering. You have to be pretty tough to resist it."

In her Cinéaste review, Susan Jhirad faulted the movie for occasionally straining credibility in its depiction of Danny's musical virtuosity, and in its idealization of the Pope's family life. She added, however, that "under the direction of Sidney Lumet the film is a sensitive portrayal of what happens to the Movement when it grows up and has kids of its own – kids who have the colossal nerve to remind us when we tell them how to live, as does Danny, 'But you always told us to mistrust authority.'"

Rotten Tomatoes gives the film an approval rating of 81% based on reviews from 31 critics. Metacritic assigns a "Generally Favorable" Metascore of 67 based on 17 critic reviews, and a "Universal Acclaim" User Score of 8.3 based on 15 user ratings.

The Japanese filmmaker Akira Kurosawa cited Running on Empty as one of his 100 favorite films.

=== Accolades ===
| Award | Category | Nominee(s) | Result |
|---|---|---|---|
| Academy Awards | Best Supporting Actor | River Phoenix | Nominated |
| Academy Awards | Best Screenplay – Written Directly for the Screen | Naomi Foner | Nominated |
| Golden Globe Awards | Best Motion Picture – Drama | | Nominated |
| Golden Globe Awards | Best Actress in a Motion Picture – Drama | Christine Lahti | Nominated |
| Golden Globe Awards | Best Supporting Actor – Motion Picture | River Phoenix | Nominated |
| Golden Globe Awards | Best Director – Motion Picture | Sidney Lumet | Nominated |
| Golden Globe Awards | Best Screenplay – Motion Picture | Naomi Foner | Won |
| Los Angeles Film Critics Association Awards | Best Actress | Christine Lahti | Won |
| National Board of Review Awards | Top Ten Films | | Won |
| National Board of Review Awards | Best Supporting Actor | River Phoenix | Won |
| PEN Center USA Literary Awards | Screenplay | Naomi Foner | Won |
| Young Artist Awards | Best Family Motion Picture – Drama | | Nominated |
| Young Artist Awards | Best Leading Young Actress in a Feature Film | Martha Plimpton | Nominated |

== See also ==
- Eleanor Raskin
- James Kilgore
- Sara Jane Olson
- Silas Bissell
- List of oldest and youngest Academy Award winners and nominees – Youngest nominees for Best Actor in a Supporting Role
- 61st Academy Awards
- 46th Golden Globe Awards
- 60th National Board of Review Awards
- 1988 in film
- The Company You Keep (2012)
