= 1988 Los Angeles Film Critics Association Awards =

Annual US film awards ceremony

14th LAFCA Awards
- Date: December 10, 1988

Highlights
- Best Picture: Little Dorrit

The 14th Los Angeles Film Critics Association Awards were announced on 10 December 1988 and given on 24 January 1989.

== Winners ==
- Best Picture:
  - Little Dorrit
  - Runner-up: Dead Ringers
- Best Director:
  - David Cronenberg – Dead Ringers
  - Runner-up: Martin Scorsese – The Last Temptation of Christ
- Best Actor:
  - Tom Hanks – Big and Punchline
  - Runner-up: Gene Hackman – Another Woman, Bat*21, Full Moon in Blue Water, Mississippi Burning and Split Decisions
- Best Actress:
  - Christine Lahti – Running on Empty
  - Runner-up: Jodie Foster – The Accused and Diane Venora – Bird
- Best Supporting Actor:
  - Alec Guinness – Little Dorrit
  - Runner-up: Martin Landau – Tucker: The Man and His Dream
- Best Supporting Actress:
  - Geneviève Bujold – Dead Ringers and The Moderns
  - Runner-up: Miriam Margolyes – Little Dorrit
- Best Screenplay:
  - Ron Shelton – Bull Durham
  - Runner-up: Alan Rudolph and Jon Bradshaw - The Moderns
- Best Cinematography:
  - Henri Alekan – Wings of Desire (Der Himmel über Berlin)
- Best Music Score:
  - Mark Isham – The Moderns
- Best Foreign Film:
  - Wings of Desire (Der Himmel über Berlin) • West Germany/France
  - Runner-up: Salaam Bombay! • UK/India/France
- Best Non-Fiction Film:
  - Hôtel Terminus: The Life and Times of Klaus Barbie
- Experimental/Independent Film/Video Award:
  - Derek Jarman – The Last of England
  - Al Razutis – Amerika
- New Generation Award:
  - Mira Nair – Salaam Bombay!
- Career Achievement Award:
  - Don Siegel
- Special Citation:
  - Who Framed Roger Rabbit
