= The Accused (1988 film) =

1988 film by Jonathan Kaplan

- Theatrical release poster
- Directed by: Jonathan Kaplan
- Written by: Tom Topor
- Produced by: Stanley R. Jaffe; Sherry Lansing
- Starring: Kelly McGillis; Jodie Foster
- Cinematography: Ralf D. Bode
- Edited by: O. Nicholas Brown; Gerald B. Greenberg
- Music by: Brad Fiedel
- Distributed by: Paramount Pictures
- Release dates: October 14, 1988 (United States); February 13, 1989 (Berlin)
- Running time: 111 minutes
- Country: United States
- Language: English
- Budget: $13 million
- Box office: $32.1 million

The Accused is a 1988 American legal drama film directed by Jonathan Kaplan and written by Tom Topor, loosely inspired by the 1983 gang rape of Cheryl Araujo in New Bedford, Massachusetts. Starring Kelly McGillis and Jodie Foster, the film follows Sarah Tobias (Foster), a waitress who is gang raped by three men at a local bar. With the help of assistant district attorney Katheryn Murphy (McGillis), she sets out to prosecute the rapists, as well as the men who encouraged the assault.

The Accused was theatrically released in the United States on October 14, 1988, and was screened at the 39th Berlin International Film Festival on February 13, 1989, where it was nominated for the Golden Bear. The film was highly controversial upon release due to its graphic portrayal of gang rape and was credited as one of the first mainstream films to deal with the horrors of rape and its aftermath on a victim's life. Despite this, it received widespread acclaim from critics, with many praising the performances of the cast and authentic portrayal of its subject matter. The film was selected by the National Board of Review as one of its Top Ten Films of 1988. Foster's performance marked her breakthrough into adult roles, winning the Academy Award for Best Actress and the Golden Globe Award for Best Actress in a Motion Picture – Drama.

== Plot ==
On April 18, 1987, 24-year-old waitress Sarah Tobias is gang-raped by three men at a local bar while several patrons watch and cheer. Assistant district attorney Katheryn Murphy is assigned to the case. Although there is strong physical evidence corroborating Sarah's rape, Katheryn assumes that Sarah will not make a credible witness if the case goes to trial due to her checkered past and flirtatious behavior with the men before her attack. She agrees to a plea bargain, allowing the three rapists to plead guilty to the lesser offense of reckless endangerment, a felony without a sexual offense, and serve two-and-a-half to five years in prison, with the expectation that they will be released after about nine months for good behavior. Sarah is angered and feels betrayed by Katheryn's decision, as she wants the chance to tell her story.

Several months later, Sarah is harassed in a parking lot by one of the men who watched and encouraged her rape. In response, she drives her car into his truck, resulting in her hospitalization. Katheryn feels guilty for not giving Sarah the choice to take her case to trial and offering her rapists a plea deal. She decides to prosecute the men who clapped and cheered during Sarah's assault for criminal solicitation. If convicted, the rape will go on record, nullifying the plea deal, and her rapists will serve five years in prison.

As the case goes to trial, Sarah is finally able to testify about what happened the night of her attack. Meanwhile, Katheryn pores over evidence and comes across a tape of a 911 call in which a young man reports Sarah's rape. She discovers the caller is Kenneth Joyce, a college student who was present that night at the bar. Reluctant at first, he agrees to testify for the prosecution, recounting how the accused men cheered and goaded the rapists on as they brutalized Sarah. The three men are found guilty of criminal solicitation, and as a result, the rapists will serve additional time in prison. Sarah leaves the courtroom triumphant with Katheryn.

The film closes with this text: "In the United States a rape is reported every six minutes. One out of every four rape victims is attacked by two or more assailants".

== Cast ==
- Jodie Foster as Sarah Tobias
- Kelly McGillis as Katheryn Murphy
- Bernie Coulson as Kenneth Joyce
- Leo Rossi as Cliff 'Scorpion' Albrecht
- Ann Hearn as Sally Frazer
- Carmen Argenziano as Paul Rudolph
- Steve Antin as Bob Joiner
- Tom O'Brien as Larry
- Peter Van Norden as Attorney Ted Paulson
- Terry David Mulligan as Duncan
- Woody Brown as Danny Ruskin
- Tom Heaton as Jesse
- Andrew Kavadas as Matt Haines
- Scott Paulin as Ben Wainwright
- Tom McBeath as Stu Holloway
- Kim Kondrashoff as Kurt
- Veena Sood as Woman Orderly

== Themes ==
It is loosely based on the 1983 gang rape of Cheryl Araujo in New Bedford, Massachusetts, and the resulting trial which received national coverage (and was also the focus of an episode on the 2020 Netflix documentary series Trial by Media). The film explores the themes of classism, misogyny, post-traumatic stress disorder, slut shaming, victim blaming, and women's empowerment.

== Production ==
=== Development ===
Jonathan and I looked at a lot of old films, and we couldn't find one that had explored the subject. There were almost no movies where the subject of the movie is rape. There are many movies that have a rape incident in them, but The Accused is entirely about rape. There's no other subject. And it's about two women; there's no man who comes to rescue them. It's a very tough subject.

— Topor explaining the importance of making the film

Screenwriter Tom Topor was inspired to write the film after the trial involving the rape of Cheryl Araujo became national news. Dawn Steel called him to ask if he'd be interested in doing a movie on the subject. Sherry Lansing and Stanley Jaffe from Paramount Pictures were subsequently signed on to produce the film. Topor interviewed 30 rape victims and numerous rapists, prosecutors, defense attorneys, and medical professionals. Jonathan Kaplan met with Steel and discussed the possibility of making a film on the subject. The original draft of the script mainly focused on the lawyer's story. However, Kaplan wanted the rape victim to be as prominent as the lawyer; the script also featured a billiard table (reflecting the real life incident), but the producers were concerned with being sued, so it was changed to a pinball machine.

Following the test screenings, the film received the lowest scores in the history of Paramount Pictures. According to Lansing, "The audience thought that Jodie's character deserved the rape." Studio executives wanted to suspend the project and were looking for ways to prevent it from being released. Lansing asked for another screening with just women, which was far more successful. Of the 20 women in the room, 18 had experience where either they or someone they knew had been raped. When tested again months later, it was given one of the highest scores in the studio's history.

=== Casting ===
Due to its hard-edged themes and graphic screenplay, the studio was already skeptical about making the film, and it was essential for the producers to cast a bankable actress in the role of Sarah Tobias. Numerous actresses were offered or considered for the part including Kim Basinger, Demi Moore, Jennifer Beals, Meg Tilly, and Rosanna Arquette, but all of them rejected the film due to its controversial themes. Producers Sherry Lansing and Stanley R. Jaffe both had serious reservations for casting Foster since they thought she could not be sexual enough for the role of Sarah. Also, Foster who had recently graduated from Yale and did not make any successful films during her time at school, was not the prime choice for the producers. Following numerous auditions and rejection from various established actresses, she was finally cast in the part.

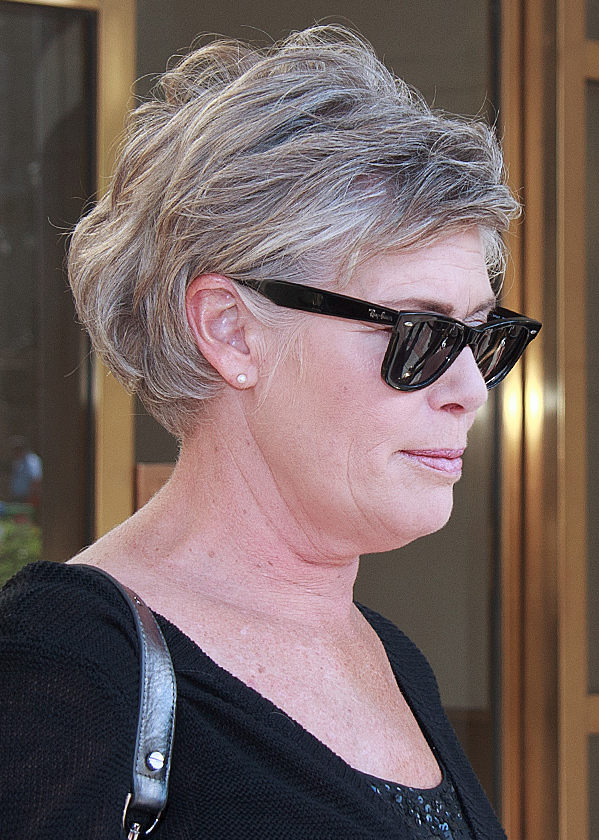
Kelly McGillis was initially offered to play Sarah Tobias, but instead took the role of Katheryn Murphy.

Jane Fonda was initially attached to play attorney Katheryn Murphy but left the project as she found the script exploitative and poorly written. Ellen Barkin, Michelle Pfeiffer, Sigourney Weaver, Debra Winger, Meryl Streep, and Geena Davis were also considered for the part. Kelly McGillis, who had just experienced commercial success with the action film Top Gun (1986), was cast for the bankable prospects of the film. McGillis was initially offered to play Sarah but declined, citing her personal experience.

She acknowledged at the time of the film's release that she had survived a violent attack and rape in 1982 when two men broke into her apartment. Based on her experience, she took on the role of Murphy.

After a long career as a child star, including a breakout performance in Taxi Driver, Foster had taken a sabbatical from Hollywood at age 18 to attend Yale, and had experienced a lack of business upon her return to acting, with several films receiving a mild response with critics and at the box office. She stated that she had thought about retiring from acting had The Accused followed suit.

=== Filming ===
Principal photography for The Accused began on April 27, 1987, and concluded on June 22. Although set in Washington state, the film was shot primarily in Vancouver, British Columbia. The gang rape scene was highly controversial at the time of the film's release. It took five days to complete, and filming was a difficult experience for the cast and crew. Everyone felt protective of Jodie Foster and was concerned about how traumatic the scene could be for her. In an interview, Foster explained that the rape scene was meticulously rehearsed beforehand to ensure there would be no unpleasant surprises during filming. She has stated that she does not remember shooting the scene and completely blacked out, even breaking blood vessels in her right eye from crying during the process. The male actors were deeply upset. Leo Rossi, who played Cliff "Scorpion" Albrect, a bystander, recalled that Woody Brown, who played Danny, one of the rapists, bolted from the set and vomited in his trailer after the scene. Complex ranked the rape scene #16 on its list of "The 53 Most Hard-To-Watch Scenes in Movie History".

=== Soundtrack ===
No.	Title	Artist	Length
1.	"I'm Talking Love"	Vanessa Anderson	3:35
2.	"At This Moment"	Billy Vera & The Beaters	2:30
3.	"Kiss of Fire"	James Harman	3:50
4.	"Love to the Limit"	Only Child	3:21
5.	"Love in Return"	House of Schock	2:20
6.	"Middle of Nowhere"	Gina Schock and Vance DeGeneres	2:10
7.	"Walk in My Sleep"	House of Schock	1:50
8.	"Mojo Boogie"	Johnny Winter	2:50

== Release ==
The Accused was released in the United States on October 14, 1988, opening in 796 theaters. Although it was supposed to be released in April, it was deferred to October due to the Writers Guild of America's strike. The film premiered at the 39th Berlin International Film Festival in 1989, where it competed for the Golden Bear.

== Reception ==
=== Box office ===
In its opening weekend in the United States and Canada, The Accused was number one at the box office, grossing $4.3 million in 796 theaters. Domestically, the film grossed $32.1 million.

=== Critical response ===
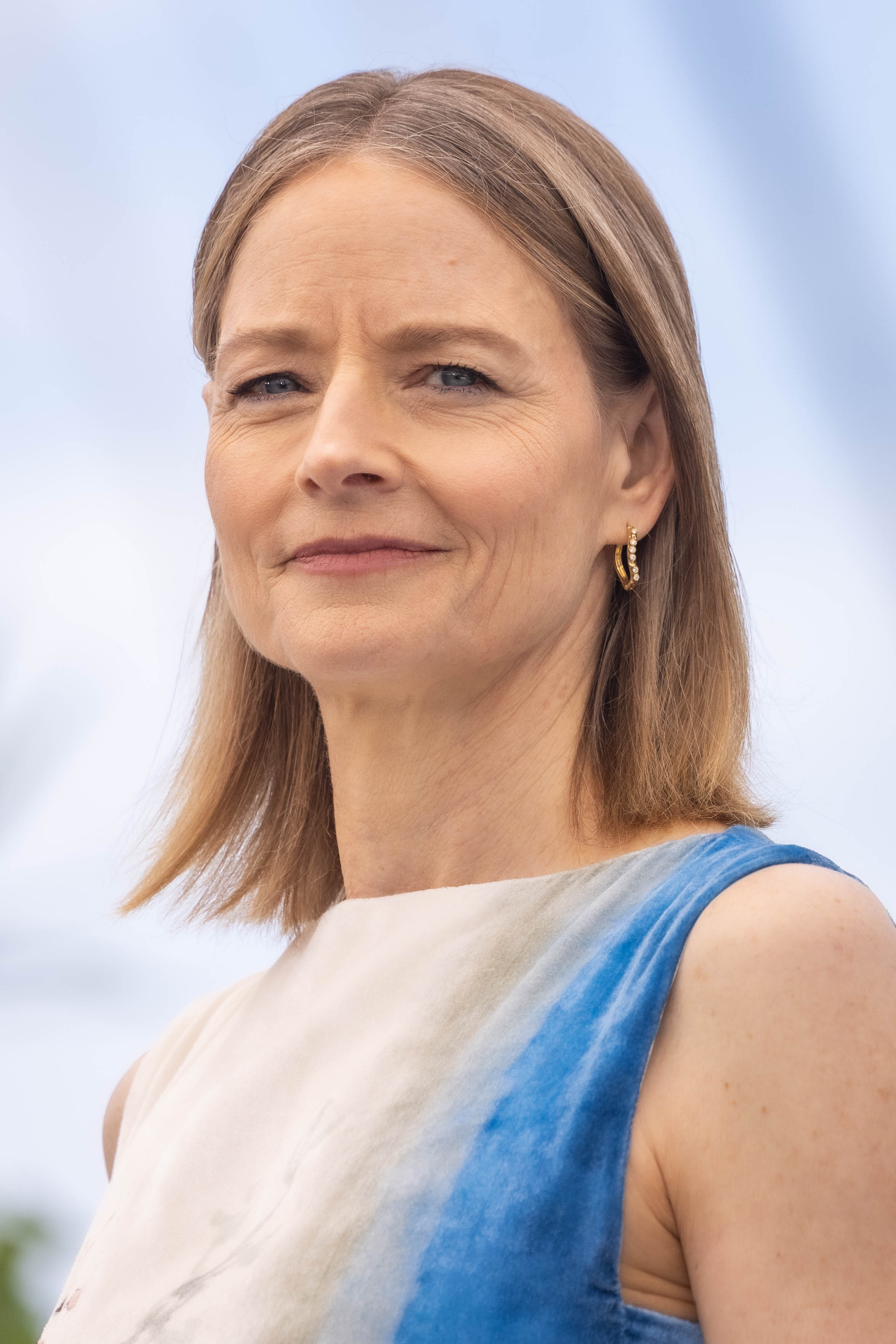
Jodie Foster's performance received widespread critical acclaim, earning her the Academy Award for Best Actress.

The Accused received positive reviews from critics upon its release, with Foster's performance receiving widespread acclaim. The review aggregator Rotten Tomatoes gives the film an approval rating of 93% based on 27 reviews, with an average rating of 7.2/10. On Metacritic, the film has an average score of 65 out of 100 indicating "generally favourable reviews".

In a positive review, writing of the two criminal prosecutions in the film, Roger Ebert finds that the lesson of the trial "may be the most important message this movie has to offer...that verbal sexual harassment, whether crudely in a saloon back room or subtly in an everyday situation, is a form of violence—one that leaves no visible marks but can make its victims feel unable to move freely and casually in society. It is a form of imprisonment." Rob Beattie from Empire, gave the film five out of five stars, calling it phenomenal and called the controversial rape scene "devastating, harrowing and utterly convincing". Judy Steed of The Globe and Mail called it "An experience that is sometimes unbearable and always riveting". Vincent Canby of The New York Times called it "A consistently engrossing melodrama, modest in its aims and as effective for the clichés it avoids as for the clear eye through which it sees its working-class American lives".

Marjorie Heins, in the 1998 book The V-Chip Debate: Content Filtering from Television to the Internet, said that educators worried that the film would "receive V ratings and be subject to at least a presumption against curricular use in many public schools."

=== Accolades ===
At the 61st Academy Awards, Foster won Best Actress. This was the film's sole nomination, and was the first occurrence of such an event since 1962 (when Sophia Loren won for Two Women) that the winner of the category won for a film with a single nomination. In 2006, Foster's performance was ranked #56 on Premiere's 100 Greatest Film Performances of all time.

Award/Festival	Category	Nominee(s)	Result	Ref.
Academy Awards	Best Actress	Jodie Foster	Won	
Berlin International Film Festival	Golden Bear	Jonathan Kaplan	Nominated	
Boston Society of Film Critics Awards	Best Actress	Jodie Foster	Runner-up	
British Academy Film Awards	Best Actress in a Leading Role	Jodie Foster	Nominated	
Chicago Film Critics Association Awards	Best Actress	Jodie Foster	Nominated	
David di Donatello Awards	Best Foreign Actress	Jodie Foster	Won	
Golden Globe Awards	Best Actress in a Motion Picture – Drama	Jodie Foster	Won (Note: Tied with Shirley MacLaine for Madame Sousatzka and Sigourney Weaver for Gorillas in the Mist.)	
Jupiter Awards	Best International Actress	Jodie Foster	Nominated	
Kansas City Film Critics Circle Awards	Best Actress	Jodie Foster	Won	
Los Angeles Film Critics Association Awards	Best Actress	Jodie Foster	Runner-up	
National Board of Review Awards	Top Ten Films		Selected	
National Board of Review Awards	Best Actress	Jodie Foster	Won	
New York Film Critics Circle Awards	Best Actress	Jodie Foster	Runner-up	
People's Choice Awards	Favourite Dramatic Motion Picture Actress	Jodie Foster	Nominated	
Political Film Society Awards	Human Rights		Nominated	
