= Mississippi Burning =

1988 American crime thriller film by Alan Parker

- Theatrical release poster
- Directed by: Alan Parker
- Written by: Chris Gerolmo
- Produced by: Frederick Zollo; Robert F. Colesberry
- Starring: Gene Hackman; Willem Dafoe
- Cinematography: Peter Biziou
- Edited by: Gerald Hambling
- Music by: Trevor Jones
- Distributed by: Orion Pictures
- Release dates: December 2, 1988 (Washington, D.C., premiere); December 9, 1988 (U.S.)
- Running time: 128 minutes
- Country: United States
- Language: English
- Budget: $15 million
- Box office: $34.6 million

Mississippi Burning is a 1988 American historical crime thriller film directed by Alan Parker and written by Chris Gerolmo. It is loosely based on the 1964 investigation into the murders of Chaney, Goodman, and Schwerner in Neshoba County, Mississippi, which was codenamed "Mississippi Burning" (or "MIBURN"). It stars Gene Hackman and Willem Dafoe as two FBI agents investigating the disappearance of three civil rights activists in rural Mississippi, who are met with hostility by the town's residents, local police, and the Ku Klux Klan.

Gerolmo began writing the script in 1986 after researching the 1964 murders of James Chaney, Andrew Goodman, and Michael Schwerner. He and producer Frederick Zollo presented it to Orion Pictures, and the studio hired Parker to direct. The writer and director had disputes over the script, and Orion allowed Parker to make uncredited rewrites. The film was shot in locations in Mississippi and Alabama, with principal photography from March to May 1988.

On release, Mississippi Burning was criticized by activists involved in the civil rights movement and the families of Chaney, Goodman, and Schwerner for its fictionalization of events. Critical reaction was generally positive, with praise for the cinematography and the performances of Hackman, Dafoe, and Frances McDormand. The film grossed $34.6 million in North America against a production budget of $15 million. It received seven Academy Award nominations, including Best Picture, and won for Best Cinematography.

== Plot ==
In 1964, three civil rights workers – two Jewish and one black – go missing in Jessup County, Mississippi (Note: A fictionalized version of Neshoba County, Mississippi.) whilst organizing a voter registry for African Americans. The FBI sends Alan Ward and Rupert Anderson to investigate. Ward is a Northerner, senior in rank but much younger than Anderson, and approaches the investigation by the book. In contrast, Anderson, a former sheriff in Mississippi, is more nuanced in his approach. The pair experiences difficulty conducting interviews with the local townspeople, as Sheriff Ray Stuckey and his deputies influence the public and are linked to a branch of the Ku Klux Klan. The FBI discovers the trio's torched car in a swamp.

With the help of the son of a local pastor, the FBI is finally able to bring forward a witness who saw Klansmen firebomb a house, and three white men are arrested and tried for felony arson. A local judge, however, gives the men a token suspended sentence while deriding the FBI as "outside agitators" who provoked the men to violence. He then releases the men, who promptly hang the witness's father and attempt to kill the witness. The FBI evacuates the family to the north and realizes they will receive absolutely no help at all from the local authorities.

Meanwhile, Anderson has developed a close relationship with the wife of Deputy Sheriff Clinton Pell, who, in a tearful confirmation, reveals to Anderson that the three missing men have been murdered by her husband and his Klansmen collaborators, who then buried the bodies in an earthen dam. After the bodies are discovered, revealing to the nation that the disappearance of the civil rights workers was murder, Pell brutally beats his wife in retribution for her betrayal.

Ward and Anderson's different approaches eventually erupts into a physical fight, which concludes when Ward pulls his gun on Anderson and admits that his methods have been ineffective; Ward gives Anderson carte blanche to deal with the problem in his way. Anderson devises a strategy to indict the Klan members for civil rights violations instead of murder, because civil rights violations are federal crimes for which conviction is more certain than state-level charges of murder. The FBI arranges the kidnapping of Mayor Tilman, taking him to a remote shack, where he is left with a black man who threatens to castrate him unless he speaks out. Tilman gives him a complete description of the killings, including the names of those implicated, such as Frank Bailey and business executive Clayton Townley. The abductor is revealed to be an FBI operative, Monk, who has been assigned to intimidate Tilman. (Note: This film is based on the account of Gregory Scarpa, who was not a Black agent but a white mobster allegedly employed as an FBI informant.) Although the information is inadmissible in court because it was obtained through coercion, it proves essential to the investigators.

Anderson and Ward concoct a plan to lure the identified Klan members to a bogus meeting. The men soon understand that they have been set up, and they leave the fake meeting without discussing the murders. The FBI focuses on Lester Cowens, a nervous Klansman, who the agents believe might yield a confession. The Feds pick him up and interrogate him. Anderson thrashes Pell at the local barbershop in retaliation for Pell's attacking his wife, Anderson takes off presently. Later, Cowens is at home when a shotgun blast shatters his windows. After seeing a burning cross on his lawn, he attempts to escape in his truck only to be caught by several hooded men intent on hanging him. The FBI team arrives to rescue him, having staged the entire scene, and the hooded men are revealed to be other FBI agents.

Cowens, in need of protection and believing that his redneck brothers have threatened his life for his admissions to the FBI, finally incriminates his accomplices. The Klansmen are charged with civil rights violations. Most of the perpetrators are convicted and sentenced to 3–10 years in prison, while Sheriff Stuckey is acquitted. The FBI later finds Mayor Tilman has hanged himself. When Agent Bird wonders why, Ward says Tilman was guilty by association for witnessing the events. Mrs. Pell returns to find her home completely ransacked by vandals. She resolves to stay and rebuild her life, free of her husband. Before they depart town, Anderson and Ward visit an integrated congregation, gathered at an African American cemetery, where the black civil rights activist's desecrated gravestone reads, "Not Forgotten."

== Cast ==
- Gene Hackman as FBI Agent Rupert Anderson (based on John Proctor)
- Willem Dafoe as FBI Agent Alan Ward (Joseph Sullivan)
- Frances McDormand as Mrs. Pell (Conner Price)
- Brad Dourif as Deputy Sheriff Clinton Pell (Cecil Price)
- R. Lee Ermey as Mayor Tilman (Abner Davis "Ab" Harbour)
- Gailard Sartain as Ray Stuckey, Sheriff of Jessup County (Lawrence A. Rainey)
- Stephen Tobolowsky as Clayton Townley (Samuel Bowers)
- Michael Rooker as Frank Bailey (Alton Wayne Roberts)
- Pruitt Taylor Vince as Lester Cowens (Jimmy Snowden)
- Stephen Bridgewater as Wesley Cooke
- Badja Djola as FBI Agent Monk (Gregory Scarpa)
- Kevin Dunn as FBI Agent Bird
- Frankie Faison as Eulogist
- Darius McCrary as Aaron Williams
- Lou Walker as Vertis Williams
- Tobin Bell as FBI Agent Stokes
- Dan Desmond as TV commentator

== Historical context ==
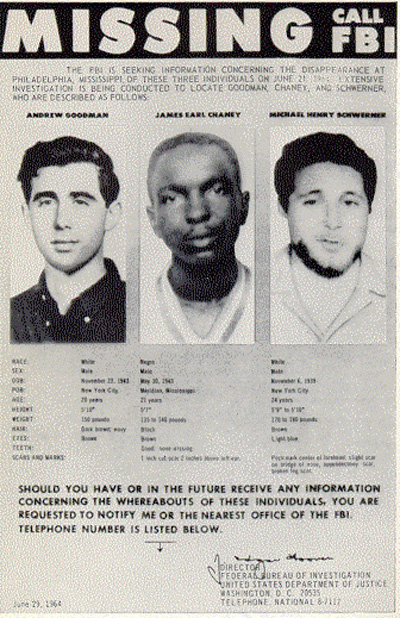
Missing persons poster created by the FBI in 1964, showing the photographs of civil rights workers Andrew Goodman, James Chaney and Michael Schwerner.

On June 21, 1964, civil rights workers James Chaney, Andrew Goodman and Michael Schwerner were arrested in Philadelphia, Mississippi, by Deputy Sheriff Cecil Price, and taken to a Neshoba County jail. The three men worked on the "Freedom Summer" campaign, attempting to organize a voter registry for African Americans. Price charged Chaney with speeding and held the other two men for questioning. He released the three men on bail seven hours later and followed them out of town. After Chaney, Goodman and Schwerner failed to return to Meridian, Mississippi, on time, workers for the Congress of Racial Equality (CORE) placed calls to the Neshoba County jail, asking if the police had any information on their whereabouts. Two days later, FBI agent John Proctor and ten other agents began their investigation in Neshoba County. They received a tip about a burning CORE station wagon seen in the woods off Highway 21, about 20 miles northeast of Philadelphia. The investigation was given the code name "MIBURN" (short for "Mississippi Burning"), and top FBI inspectors were sent to help with the case.

On August 4, 1964, the bodies of the three men were found after an informant nicknamed "Mr. X" in FBI reports passed along a tip to federal authorities. They were discovered underneath an earthen dam on a 253-acre farm located a few miles outside Philadelphia, Mississippi. All three men had been shot. Nineteen suspects were the subject of a federal indictment for violating the workers' civil rights. On October 27, 1967, a federal trial conducted in Meridian resulted in only seven of the defendants, including Price, being convicted with sentences ranging from three to ten years. Nine were acquitted, and the jury deadlocked on three others.

== Production ==
=== Development ===
In 1985, screenwriter Chris Gerolmo discovered an article that excerpted a chapter from the book Inside Hoover's F.B.I., which chronicled the FBI's investigation into the murders of Chaney, Goodman and Schwerner. While writing a draft script, Gerolmo brought it to producer Frederick Zollo, who worked with him on Miles from Home (1988). Zollo helped Gerolmo develop the original draft before they sold it to Orion Pictures.

The studio then began its search for a director. Filmmakers Miloš Forman and John Schlesinger were among those considered. In September 1987, Alan Parker was given a copy of Gerolmo's script by Orion's executive vice president and co-founder Mike Medavoy. When Parker traveled to Tokyo, Japan, to act as a juror for the 1987 Tokyo International Film Festival, his colleague Robert F. Colesberry began researching the time period, and compiled books, newspaper articles, live news footage and photographs related to the 1964 murders. Upon returning to the United States, Parker met with Colesberry in New York and spent several months viewing the research. The director also began selecting the creative team; the production reunited Parker with many of his past collaborators, including Colesberry, casting directors Howard Feuer and Juliet Taylor, director of photography Peter Biziou, editor Gerry Hambling, costume designer Aude Bronson-Howard, production designer Geoffrey Kirkland, camera operator Michael Roberts, and music composer Trevor Jones.

=== Writing ===
Gerolmo described his original draft script as "a big, passionate, violent detective story set against the greatest sea-change in American life in the 20th century, the civil rights movement". For legal reasons, the names of the people and certain details related to the FBI's investigation were changed. On presenting Clinton Pell's wife as an informant, Gerolmo said, "... the fact that no one knew who Mr. X, the informant, was, left that as a dramatic possibility for me, in my Hollywood movie version of the story. That's why Mr. X became the wife of one of the conspirators." The abductor of Mayor Tilman was originally written as a Mafia hitman who forces a confession by putting a pistol in Tilman's mouth. Gerolmo was inspired by Gregory Scarpa, a mob enforcer allegedly recruited by the FBI during their search for Goodman, Chaney and Schwerner.

After Parker was hired to direct the film, Gerolmo had completed two drafts. Parker met with Gerolmo at Orion's offices in Century City, Los Angeles, where they began work on a third draft script. Both the writer and director, however, had repeated disagreements over the focus of the story. To resolve the issue, Orion executives in New York gave Parker one month to make uncredited rewrites before green-lighting the project.

Parker made several changes from Gerolmo's original draft. He omitted the Mafia hitman and created the character Agent Monk, a black FBI specialist who kidnaps Tilman. The scene in which Frank Bailey brutally beats a news cameraman was based on an actual event; Parker and Colesberry were inspired by a news outtake found during their research, in which a CBS News cameraman was assaulted by a suspect in the 1964 murder case. Parker also wrote a sex scene involving Rupert Anderson and Mrs. Pell. The scene was omitted during filming after Gene Hackman, who portrays Anderson, suggested to Parker that the relationship between the two characters be more discreet. By January 4, 1988, Parker had written a complete shooting script, which he submitted to Orion executives. Gerolmo did not visit the production during principal photography, due to the 1988 Writers Guild of America strike.

=== Casting ===
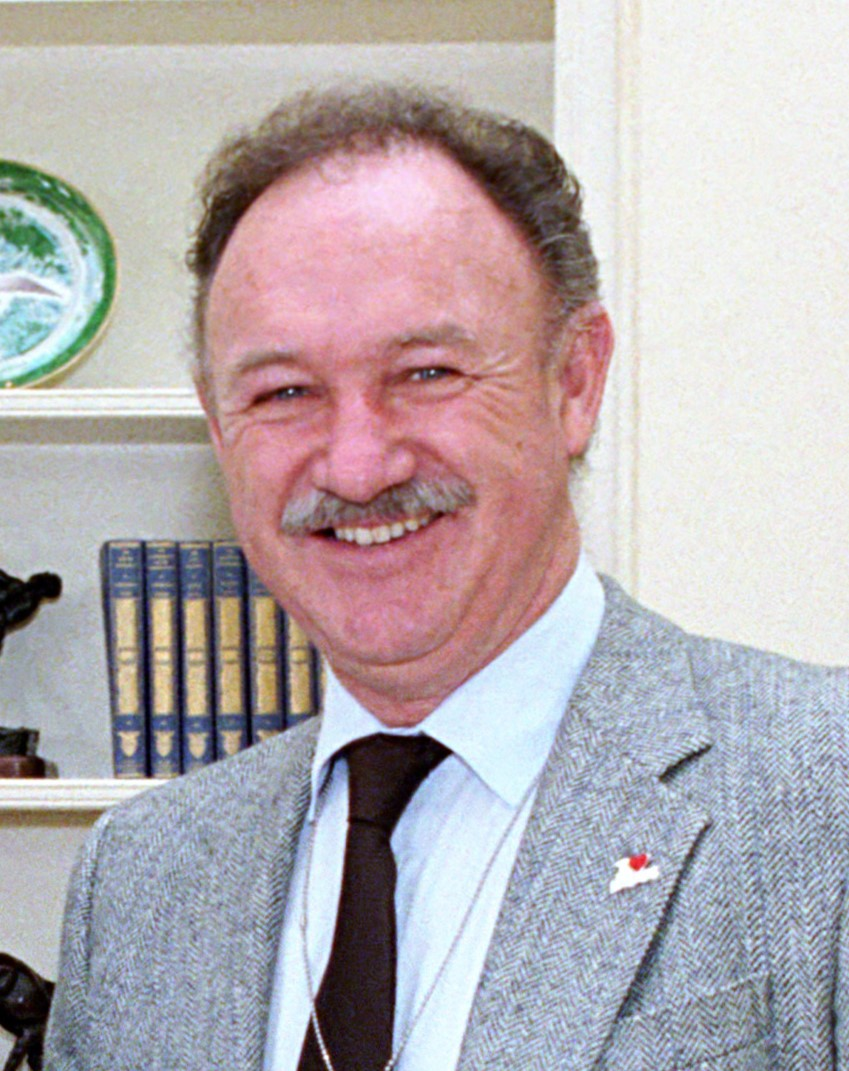
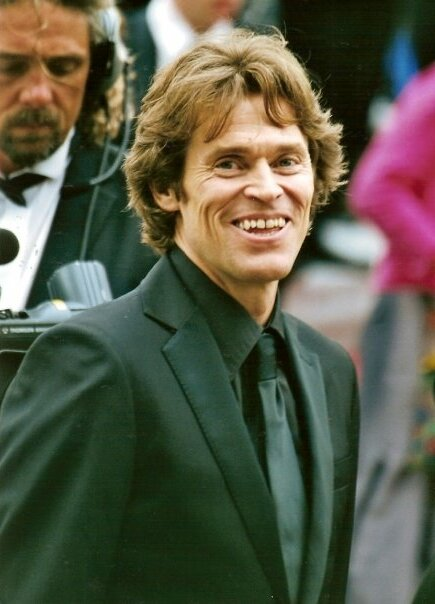
Gene Hackman and Willem Dafoe, who star in the film.

Parker held casting calls in New York, Atlanta, Houston, Dallas, Orlando, New Orleans, Raleigh and Nashville. The filmmakers did not retain the names of actual people; many of the supporting characters were composites of people related to the murder case. Gene Hackman plays Rupert Anderson, an FBI agent and former Mississippi sheriff. Brian Dennehy was briefly considered for the role before Orion suggested Hackman. As the script was being written, Parker frequently discussed the project with Hackman. Hackman said that "it felt right to do something of historical import. It was an extremely intense experience, both the content of the film and the making of it in Mississippi."

Orion was less resolute in terms of who they wanted for the role of Agent Alan Ward. After filming The Last Temptation of Christ (1988), Willem Dafoe expressed interest in playing Ward, and Parker traveled to Los Angeles, where he met with the actor to discuss the role. Dafoe was cast shortly thereafter. To prepare for the role, Dafoe researched the time period and Neshoba County. He also read Willie Morris's 1983 novel The Courting of Marcus Dupree, and looked at 1960s documentary footage detailing how the media covered the murder case. Frances McDormand plays Mrs. Pell, the wife of Deputy Sheriff Clinton Pell. On working with Hackman, McDormand said: "Mississippi Burning, I didn't do research. All I did was listen to [Hackman]. He had an amazing capacity for not giving away any part of himself (in read-throughs). But the minute we got on the set, little blinds on his eyes flipped up and everything was available. It was mesmerizing. He's really believable, and it was like a basic acting lesson."

Gailard Sartain plays Ray Stuckey, the sheriff of Jessup County, a character based on former Neshoba County sheriff Lawrence Rainey. Sartain described Stuckey as "an elected official ... who has to be gregarious – but with sinister overtones". Stephen Tobolowsky plays Clayton Townley, a Grand Wizard of the White Knights of the Ku Klux Klan. The character is based on White Knights leader Samuel Bowers. Michael Rooker plays Frank Bailey, a Klansman involved in the murders of the three civil rights activists. Pruitt Taylor Vince, who had a small role in Parker's previous film Angel Heart, plays Lester Cowens, a Klansman who unknowingly becomes a pawn in the FBI's investigation. Vince described the character as "goofy, stupid and geeky" and stated, "I never had a prejudiced bone in my body. It gave me a funny feeling to play this guy with a hood and everything. But when you're in the midst of it, you just concentrate on getting through it."

Kevin Dunn joined the production in February 1988, appearing in his acting debut as FBI Agent Bird. Tobin Bell, also making his feature film debut, plays Agent Stokes, an FBI enforcer hired by Anderson to interrogate Cowens. Bell was first asked by Parker to read for the role of Clinton Pell, a role that was ultimately given to Brad Dourif.

Appearing as the three civil rights activists are Geoffrey Nauffts as "Goatee", a character based on Michael Schwerner; Rick Zieff as "Passenger", based on Andrew Goodman; and Christopher White as "Black Passenger", based on James Chaney. Producers Frederick Zollo and Robert F. Colesberry also make appearances in the film; Zollo briefly appears as a news reporter, and Colesberry appears as a news cameraman who is brutally beaten by Frank Bailey. While scouting locations in Jackson, Mississippi, Parker arranged an open casting call for local actors and extras. He and Colesberry met music teacher Lannie McBride, who appears as a gospel singer in the film.

=== Filming ===
Location scouting

During the screenwriting process, Parker and Colesberry began scouting locations. They visited eight states based on suggestions made by the location department. The shooting script required that a total of 62 locations be used for filming. In December 1987, Parker and Colesberry traveled to Mississippi to visit the stretch of road where Goodman, Chaney and Schwerner were murdered. The filmmakers were initially reluctant about filming in Mississippi; they expressed interest in filming in Forsyth County, Georgia, before being persuaded by John Horne, head of Mississippi's film commission. Parker also met with Mississippi governor Ray Mabus, who voiced his support of the film's production.

Parker and Colesberry looked at locations near Jackson, Mississippi, where they set up production offices at a Holiday Inn hotel. They also visited Canton, Mississippi, before travelling to Vaiden, Mississippi, where they scouted more than 200 courthouses that could be used for filming. Parker and Colesberry had difficulty finding a small town for the story setting before choosing LaFayette, Alabama, to act as scenes set in the fictional town of Jessup County, Mississippi, with other scenes being shot in a number of locales in Mississippi.

Principal photography

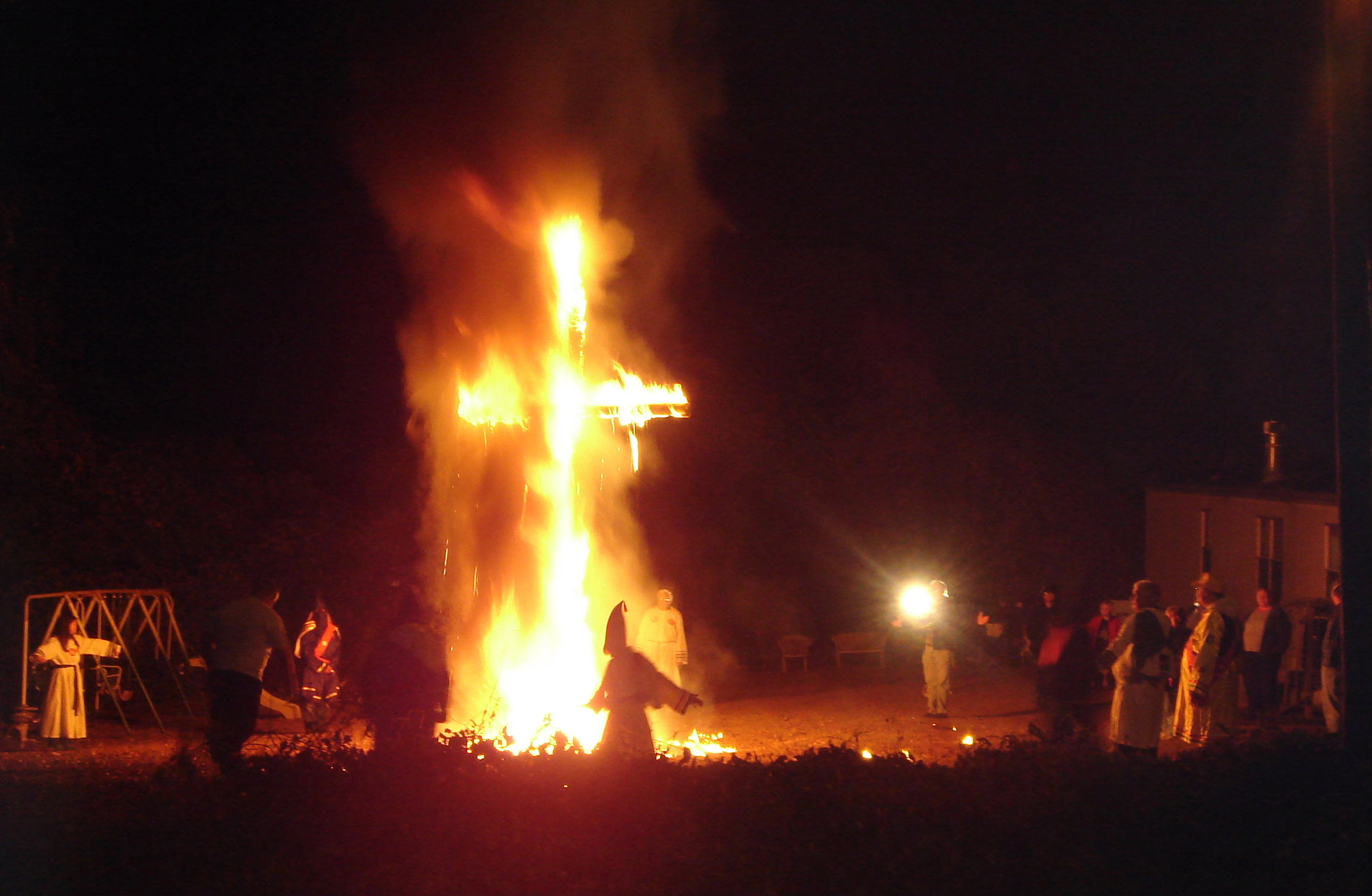
The burning of a cross, similar to scenes depicted in the film.

Principal photography began on March 7, 1988, with a budget of $15 million. Filming began in Jackson, Mississippi, where the production team filmed a church being burned down. The sequence required a multiple-camera setup; a total of three cameras were used during the shoot. On March 8, the production team filmed a scene set in a motel where Anderson (Hackman) delivers a monologue to Ward (Dafoe). On March 10, production moved to a remote corner of Mississippi, where the crew filmed the burning of a parish church.

On March 11, the production filmed scenes set in a pig farm, where a young boy is confronted and attacked by three perpetrators. A night later, the crew shot the film's opening sequence, in which the three civil rights workers are murdered. From March 14 to March 18, the crew filmed the burning of several more churches, as well as scenes set in a farm. On March 22, the crew filmed scenes set in a morgue that was located inside the University of Mississippi Medical Center, exactly the same location where the bodies of Goodman, Chaney and Schwerner were transported. A day later, Parker and the crew filmed a scene set in a cotton field. The art department had to dress each plant with layers of cotton, as the cotton plants had not fully bloomed. The crew also filmed the abduction of Mayor Tilman (R. Lee Ermey) and his subsequent interrogation by FBI agent Monk (Badja Djola). On March 24, the production moved to Raymond, Mississippi, where the crew filmed a scene at the John Bell Williams Airport. Depicting Monk's departure, the scene was choreographed by Parker and the cast members so that it could be filmed in one take.

The production then moved to Vaiden, Mississippi to film scenes set in the Carroll County Courthouse, where several courtroom scenes, as well as scenes set in Sheriff Ray Stuckey's office were filmed. The production moved to Vicksburg, Mississippi, where the crew filmed a funeral procession. On April 11, 1988, the crew filmed a scene set in the Cedar Hill Cemetery. From April 15 to April 16, the production moved to the Mississippi River valley to depict the FBI and United States Navy's search for the three civil rights workers. The art department recreated a Choctaw Indian Village on the location, based on old photographs. On April 23, the crew filmed a scene depicting a Citizens' Councils rally with 750 extras. On April 25, the crew returned to Jackson, Mississippi, where an unused building was to recreate a diner that was found in Alabama during location scouting. A day later, Hackman and Dafoe filmed their opening scene, in which the characters Anderson and Ward drive to Jessup County, Mississippi.

On April 27, the production moved to LaFayette, Alabama, for the remainder of filming. From April 28 to April 29, Parker and his crew filmed scenes set in Mrs. Pell's home. On May 5, the production shot one of the film's final scenes, in which Anderson discovers Mrs. Pell's home trashed. On May 13, the crew filmed scenes in a former LaFayette movie theatre. The art department restored the theatre's interiors to reflect the time period. Filming concluded on May 14, 1988, with the Ku Klux Klan speech scene.

=== Music ===
The score was produced, arranged and composed by Trevor Jones, his second collaboration with Parker after Angel Heart. In addition to Jones's score, the soundtrack features several gospel songs, including "Walk on by Faith" performed by Lannie McBride, "Take My Hand, Precious Lord" performed by Mahalia Jackson and "Try Jesus" performed by Vesta Williams. A motion picture soundtrack album was released by the recording labels Antilles Records and Island Records.

== Release ==
Mississippi Burning held its world premiere at the Uptown Theatre in Washington, D.C., on December 2, 1988, with various politicians, ambassadors and political reporters in attendance. United States Senator Ted Kennedy voiced his support of the film, stating, "This movie will educate millions of Americans too young to recall the sad events of that summer about what life was like in this country before the enactment of the civil rights laws." The film was given a platform release, first being released in a small number of cities in North America before opening nationwide. It opened in Washington, Los Angeles, Chicago, Toronto and New York City on December 9, 1988. Orion was confident that the limited release would help qualify the film for Academy Awards consideration, and generate strong word-of-mouth support from audiences. The film opened in wide release on January 27, 1989, playing at 1,058 theaters, and expanding to 1,074 theatres by its ninth week.

=== Box office ===
Mississippi Burning's first week of limited release saw it take $225,034, an average of $25,003.40 per theater. The film grossed an additional $160,628 in its second weekend. More theaters were added during the limited run, and on January 27, 1989, the film officially entered wide release. Over its first weekend of wide release, the film grossed $3,545,305, securing the number five position at the domestic box office with a domestic gross to date of $14,726,112. The film generated strong local interest in the state of Mississippi, resulting in sold-out showings in the first four days of wide release. After seven weeks of wide release, Mississippi Burning ended its theatrical run with an overall gross of $34,603,943. In North America, it was the thirty-third highest-grossing film of 1988 and the seventeenth highest-grossing R-rated film of that year.

=== Home media ===
Mississippi Burning was released on VHS on July 27, 1989, by Orion Home Video. A "Collector's Edition" of the film was released on LaserDisc on April 3, 1998. The film was released on DVD on May 8, 2001, by MGM Home Entertainment. Special features for the DVD include an audio commentary by Parker and a theatrical trailer. The film was released on Blu-ray on May 12, 2015, by the home video label Twilight Time, with a limited release of 3,000 copies. The Blu-ray presents the film in 1080p high definition, and contains the additional materials found on the MGM DVD. Kino Lorber reissued the film on Blu-ray on June 18, 2019, with a new 4K transfer and all the previously available extras.

== Reception ==
=== Critical response ===
Frances McDormand's performance received critical acclaim, earning her a nomination for the Academy Award for Best Supporting Actress.

The review aggregation website Rotten Tomatoes sampled 29 reviews and gave Mississippi Burning a score of 79%. The consensus reads: "Mississippi Burning draws on real-life tragedy to impart a worthy message with the measured control of an intelligent drama and the hard-hitting impact of a thriller." Another review aggregator, Metacritic, assigned the film a weighted average score of 65 out of 100 based on 11 reviews from mainstream critics, indicating "generally favorable reviews". Audiences polled by CinemaScore gave the film an average grade of "A" on an A+ to F scale.

In a review for Time magazine entitled "Just Another Mississippi Whitewash", author Jack E. White described the film as a "cinematic lynching of the truth". Columnist Desson Howe of The Washington Post felt that the film "speeds down the complicated, painful path of civil rights in search of a good thriller. Surprisingly, it finds it." Jonathan Rosenbaum lambasted Parker's direction and stated that the film's focus on "the FBI as the sole heroic defender of the victims of southern racism in 1964...subverts the history of the civil rights movement itself". In addition, he opined that the nonwhite characters in the film are portrayed as "noble, suffering icons without any depth or personality". Rita Kempley, also writing for The Washington Post, criticized the film for viewing "the black struggle from an all-white perspective", and drew comparisons to Cry Freedom (1987), writing that both films had "the right story, but with the wrong heroes." Pauline Kael, writing for The New Yorker, praised the acting, but described the film as being "morally repugnant".

Vincent Canby of The New York Times praised the film's fictionalization of history, writing: "The film doesn't pretend to be about the civil-rights workers themselves. It's almost as if Mr. Parker and Mr. Gerolmo respected the victims, their ideals and their fate too much to reinvent them through the use of fiction." In his review for the Chicago Sun-Times, Roger Ebert surmised: "We knew the outcome of this case when we walked into the theater. What we may have forgotten, or never known, is exactly what kinds of currents were in the air in 1964." On the syndicated television program Siskel and Ebert and the Movies, Ebert and his colleague Gene Siskel gave the film a "two thumbs up" rating. On his year-end top ten films list, Ebert ranked Mississippi Burning the #1 movie of 1988. Writing for the Chicago Tribune, Siskel praised Hackman and Dafoe's "subtle" performances, but felt that McDormand was "most effective as the film's moral conscience".

Like Siskel, Variety magazine also praised the performances, writing: "Dafoe gives a disciplined and noteworthy portrayal of Ward ... But it's Hackman who steals the picture as Anderson ... Glowing performance of Frances McDormand as the deputy's wife who's drawn to Hackman is an asset both to his role and the picture." Sheila Benson, in her review for the Los Angeles Times, wrote: "Hackman's mastery at suggesting an infinite number of layers beneath a wry, self-deprecating surface reaches a peak here, but McDormand soars right with him. And since she is the film's sole voice of morality, it's right that she is so memorable."

=== Controversies ===
"... with Mississippi Burning the controversy got out of hand. It was impossible to turn on a TV without someone discussing the movie – or using the movie to trigger the debate ... In the beginning, it was rather nice to have your film talked about but suddenly the tide turned and although it did well at the box office, we were dogged by a lot of anger that the film generated."

— Parker reflecting on the film's controversy.

Following its release, Mississippi Burning became embroiled in controversy over its fictionalization of events. Gerolmo and Parker have admitted taking artistic license with the source material, describing it as essentially a ''work of fiction''. The killing itself, as portrayed in the film, differed from the actual events in several ways. In the film, during the car stop precipitating the murder, the driver is white (presumably either Andrew Goodman or Michael Schwerner), and the black civil rights volunteer (presumably James Chaney) is in the back seat. In reality, James Chaney drove the car because he was familiar with the area. The film presents the murders as having been committed at the scene of the stop while the victims were in their car, beginning with Frank Bailey putting a revolver to the temple of the car's driver and shooting. In reality, all three victims were first taken to jail and were shot after their release. Andrew Goodman and Michael Schwerner were shot once in the heart, followed by James Chaney who was shot three times. Much of the violence and intimidation of the black people in the film is drawn from events that occurred at the time, although not necessarily in relation to this investigation. The title itself comes from the FBI code name for the investigation, and some of the dialogue is drawn directly from their files. A lot of the fictional elements surround the actions of the two main FBI agents.

Coretta Scott King, widow of Martin Luther King Jr., boycotted the film, stating: "How long will we have to wait before Hollywood finds the courage and the integrity to tell the stories of some of the many thousands of black men, women and children who put their lives on the line for equality?" Myrlie Evers-Williams, the wife of slain civil rights activist Medgar Evers, said of the film: "It was unfortunate that it was so narrow in scope that it did not show one black role model that today's youth who look at the movie could remember." Benjamin Hooks, the executive director of the National Association for the Advancement of Colored People (NAACP), stated that the film, in its fictionalization of historical events, "reeks with dishonesty, deception and fraud" and portrays African Americans as "cowed, submissive and blank-faced".

Carolyn Goodman, mother of Andrew Goodman, and Ben Chaney Jr., the younger brother of James Chaney, expressed that they were both "disturbed" by the film. Goodman felt that it "used the deaths of the boys as a means of solving the murders and the FBI being heroes." Chaney stated, "... the image that younger people got (from the film) about the times, about Mississippi itself and about the people who participated in the movement being passive, was pretty negative and it didn't reflect the truth." Stephen Schwerner, brother of Michael Schwerner, felt that the film was "terribly dishonest and very racist" and "[distorted] the realities of 1964".

On a Martin Luther King Jr. Day (January 16, 1989) episode of ABC's late-night news program Nightline, Julian Bond, a social activist and leader in the Civil Rights Movement, nicknamed the film "Rambo Meets the Klan" and disapproved of its depiction of the FBI: "People are going to have a mistaken idea about that time ... It's just wrong. These guys were tapping our telephones, not looking into the murders of [Goodman, Chaney and Schwerner]." When asked about the film at the 1989 Cannes Film Festival, filmmaker Spike Lee criticized the lack of central African-American characters, believing the film was among several others that used a white savior narrative to exploit blacks in favor of depicting whites as heroes.

In response to these criticisms, Parker defended the film, stating that it was "fiction in the same way that Platoon and Apocalypse Now are fictions of the Vietnam War. But the important thing is the heart of the truth, the spirit ... I defend the right to change it in order to reach an audience who knows nothing about the realities and certainly don't watch PBS documentaries."

In spite of the criticism, the film inspired Jerry Mitchell to begin researching suspects. Ultimately his reporting contributed to the conviction of Edgar Ray Killen for the murders of Chaney, Goodman, and Schwerner. He later concentrated on other civil rights cases and helped convict the likes of Bobby Cherry, Sam Bowers, and Byron de la Beckwith.

=== Legal dispute ===
On February 21, 1989, former Neshoba County sheriff Lawrence Rainey filed a lawsuit against Orion Pictures, claiming defamation and invasion of privacy. The lawsuit, filed at a United States district court in Meridian, Mississippi, asked for $8 million in damages. Rainey, who was the county sheriff at the time of the 1964 murders, alleged that the filmmakers of Mississippi Burning portrayed him in an unfavorable light with the fictional character of Sheriff Ray Stuckey (Gailard Sartain). "Everybody all over the South knows the one they have playing the sheriff in that movie is referring to me," he stated. "What they said happened and what they did to me certainly wasn't right and something ought to be done about it." Rainey's lawsuit was unsuccessful; he dropped the suit after Orion's team of lawyers threatened to prove that the film was based on fact, and that Rainey was indeed suspected in the 1964 murders.

=== Accolades ===
Mississippi Burning received various awards and nominations in categories ranging from recognition of the film itself to its writing, direction, editing, sound and cinematography, to the performances of Gene Hackman and Frances McDormand. It was named one of the "Top 10 Films of 1988" by the National Board of Review. The organization also awarded the film top honors at the 60th National Board of Review Awards: Best Film, Best Director, Best Actor and Best Supporting Actress.

In January 1989, the film received four Golden Globe Award nominations for Best Motion Picture – Drama, Best Director, Best Screenplay and Best Actor – Motion Picture Drama (Hackman), though it failed to win any of the awards at the 46th Golden Globe Awards. In February 1989, Mississippi Burning was nominated for seven Academy Awards, including Best Picture, Best Director and Best Actor; its closest rivals were Rain Man leading with eight nominations, and Dangerous Liaisons, which also received seven nominations. On March 29, 1989, at the 61st Academy Awards, the film won only one of the seven awards for which it was nominated, Best Cinematography. At the 43rd British Academy Film Awards, the film received five nominations, ultimately winning for Best Sound, Best Cinematography and Best Editing.

List of awards and nominations received by Mississippi Burning
Award	Category	Nominee	Result
61st Academy Awards	Best Picture	Frederick Zollo and Robert F. Colesberry	Nominated
61st Academy Awards	Best Director	Alan Parker	Nominated
61st Academy Awards	Best Actor	Gene Hackman	Nominated
61st Academy Awards	Best Supporting Actress	Frances McDormand	Nominated
61st Academy Awards	Best Cinematography	Peter Biziou	Won
61st Academy Awards	Best Film Editing	Gerry Hambling	Nominated
61st Academy Awards	Best Sound	Robert J. Litt, Elliot Tyson, Rick Kline and Danny Michael	Nominated
1989 Annual ACE Eddie Awards	Best Edited Feature Film – Dramatic	Gerry Hambling	Won
1989 Annual ASC Awards	ASC Award	Peter Biziou	Nominated
39th Berlin International Film Festival	Silver Bear for Best Actor	Gene Hackman	Won
39th Berlin International Film Festival	Silver Bear for Best Director	Alan Parker	Nominated
43rd British Academy Film Awards	Best Sound	Bill Phillips, Danny Michael, Robert J. Litt, Elliot Tyson, Rick Kline	Won
43rd British Academy Film Awards	Best Cinematography	Peter Biziou	Won
43rd British Academy Film Awards	Best Editing	Gerry Hambling	Won
43rd British Academy Film Awards	Best Direction	Alan Parker	Nominated
43rd British Academy Film Awards	Best Film Music	Trevor Jones	Nominated
1989 British Society of Cinematographers Awards	Best Cinematography	Peter Biziou	Won
1989 Artios Awards	Best Casting for a Drama Film	Howard Feuer, Juliet Taylor	Won
2nd Chicago Film Critics Association Awards	Best Film	————	Won
2nd Chicago Film Critics Association Awards	Best Supporting Actress	Frances McDormand	Won
2nd Chicago Film Critics Association Awards	Best Actor	Gene Hackman	Nominated
2nd Chicago Film Critics Association Awards	Best Supporting Actor	Brad Dourif	Nominated
David di Donatello Awards	Best Foreign Actor	Gene Hackman	Nominated
David di Donatello Awards	Best Foreign Film	Alan Parker	Nominated
41st Directors Guild of America Awards	Outstanding Directing – Feature Film	Alan Parker	Nominated
1988 Kansas City Film Critics Circle Awards	Best Supporting Actress	Frances McDormand	Won
14th Los Angeles Film Critics Association Awards	Best Actor	Gene Hackman	Nominated
46th Golden Globe Awards	Best Motion Picture – Drama	————	Nominated
46th Golden Globe Awards	Best Director	Alan Parker	Nominated
46th Golden Globe Awards	Best Actor – Motion Picture Drama	Gene Hackman	Nominated
46th Golden Globe Awards	Best Screenplay	Chris Gerolmo	Nominated
60th National Board of Review Awards	Best Film	————	Won
60th National Board of Review Awards	Best Director	Alan Parker	Won
60th National Board of Review Awards	Best Actor	Gene Hackman	Won
60th National Board of Review Awards	Best Supporting Actress	Frances McDormand	Won
60th National Board of Review Awards	Top Ten Films	————	Won
23rd National Society of Film Critics Awards	Best Actor	Gene Hackman	Nominated
54th New York Film Critics Circle Awards	Best Film	————	Nominated
54th New York Film Critics Circle Awards	Best Actor	Gene Hackman	Nominated
1989 Political Film Society Awards	Human Rights Award	————	Won

== See also ==
- 1988 in film
- Civil rights movement in popular culture

== Bibliography ==
- Gonthier, David F. Jr.; O'Brien, Timothy M. (2015). The Films of Alan Parker, 1976–2003. McFarland. ISBN 9780786497256.
- Nossiter, Adam (2009). Of Long Memory: Mississippi And The Murder Of Medgar Evers. Da Capo Press. ISBN 9780786748488.
- Roman, James (2009). Bigger Than Blockbusters: Movies That Defined America. ABC-CLIO. ISBN 9780313087400.
- Smith, John David; Appleton, Thomas H.; Roland, Charles Pierce, eds. (1997). A Mythic Land Apart: Reassessing Southerners and Their History. Greenwood Publishing Group. ISBN 9780313293047.
- Toplin, Robert Brent (1996). History by Hollywood: The Use and Abuse of the American Past. University of Illinois Press. ISBN 9780252065361.
