= National Board of Review Awards 1988 =

Annual US film awards ceremony

60th National Board of Review Awards

Best Picture:
Mississippi Burning

The 60th National Board of Review Awards were announced on December 13, 1988, and given on February 27, 1989.

== Top 10 films ==
1. Mississippi Burning
2. Dangerous Liaisons
3. The Accused
4. The Unbearable Lightness of Being
5. The Last Temptation of Christ
6. Tucker: The Man and His Dream
7. Big
8. Running on Empty
9. Gorillas in the Mist
10. Midnight Run

== Top foreign films ==
1. Women on the Verge of a Nervous Breakdown
2. Pelle the Conqueror
3. Le Grand Chemin
4. Salaam Bombay!
5. A Taxing Woman

== Winners ==
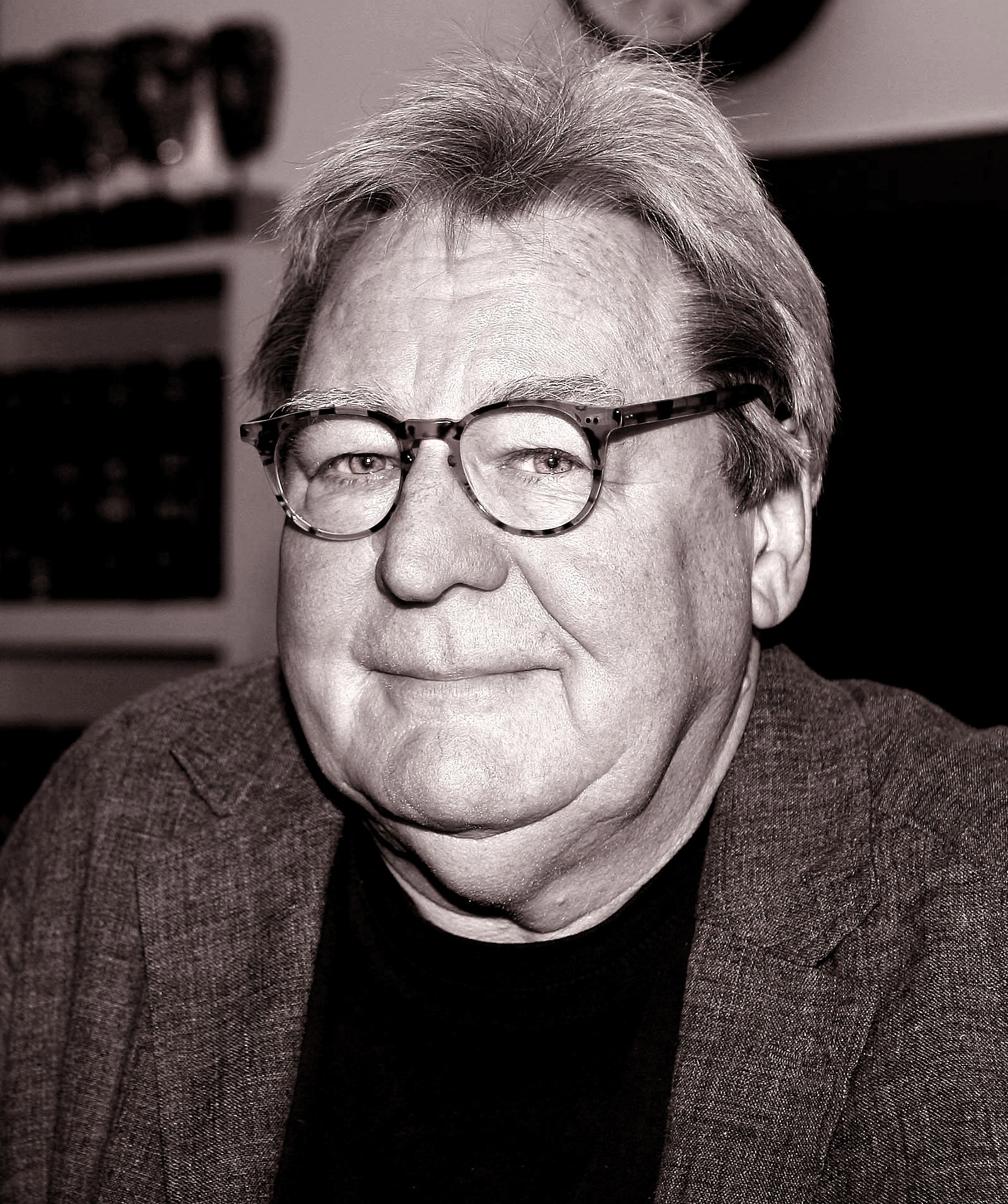
Alan Parker, Best Director winner

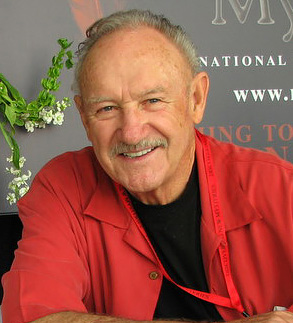
Gene Hackman, Best Actor winner

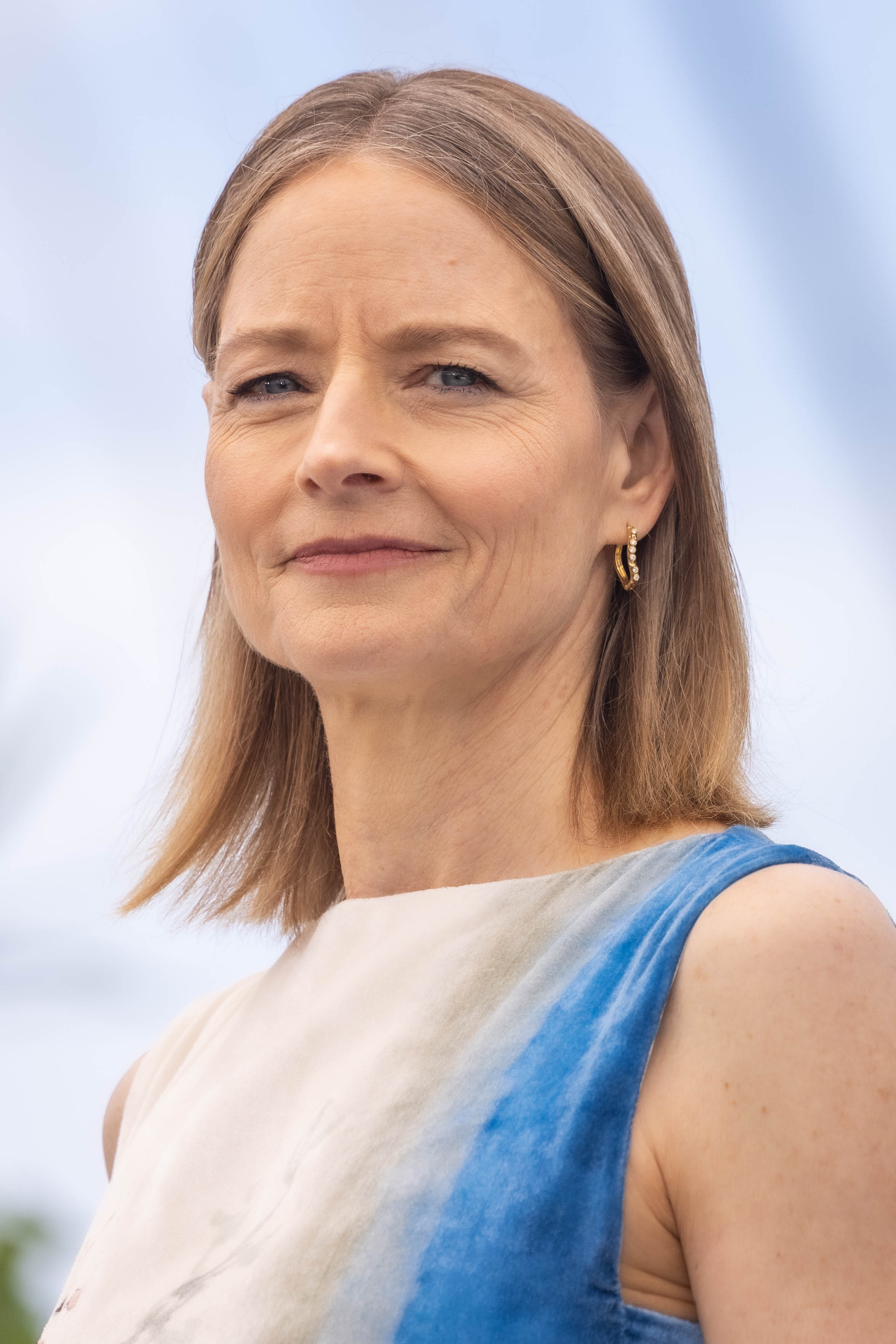
Jodie Foster, Best Actress winner

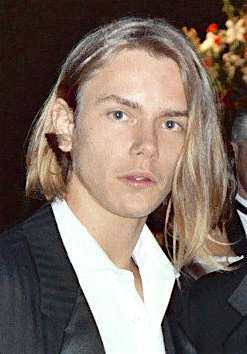
River Phoenix, Best Supporting Actor winner

Frances McDormand, Best Supporting Actress winner

- Best Picture:
  - Mississippi Burning
- Best Foreign Film:
  - Women on the Verge of a Nervous Breakdown
- Best Actor:
  - Gene Hackman - Mississippi Burning
- Best Actress:
  - Jodie Foster - The Accused
- Best Supporting Actor:
  - River Phoenix - Running on Empty
- Best Supporting Actress:
  - Frances McDormand - Mississippi Burning
- Best Director:
  - Alan Parker - Mississippi Burning
- Best Documentary
  - The Thin Blue Line
- Career Achievement Award:
  - Kirk Douglas
