= Cheryl Araujo =

American rape victim (1961–1986)

- Born: Cheryl Ann Araujo; March 28, 1961; New Bedford, Massachusetts, U.S.
- Died: December 14, 1986 (aged 25); Miami, Florida, U.S.
- Known for: Assault victim and subject of The Accused

Cheryl Ann Araujo (March 28, 1961 – December 14, 1986) was an American woman from New Bedford, Massachusetts, who was gang-raped in 1983 at age 21 by six men in a tavern in the city. Her case became national news and drew widespread attention to media coverage of rape trials.

During the prosecution of the case, the defendants' attorneys cross-examined Araujo to such an extent about her own life and activities that the case became widely seen as a template for "blaming the victim" in rape cases. Her case was widely known as "Big Dan's rape,” after the name of the bar in which the attack occurred.

Ostracized in New Bedford, Araujo moved with her family to Miami to make a new life. Shortly after, on December 14, 1986, she died in a car crash near her home.

Her case prompted national debate over broadcasting of the trial, during which her name was released. Some states have passed legislation to protect the names of rape victims. Court cases have attempted to settle issues of newsworthiness, freedom of the press, state interest, and personal privacy. Her case is the basis of the film The Accused (1988) starring Jodie Foster.

== Assault ==
On March 6, 1983, after putting her two daughters to sleep following a birthday party for the older girl, Araujo left her home in New Bedford, Massachusetts, to meet a girlfriend for dinner. Araujo's boyfriend stayed behind to watch a football game and take care of their daughters. After dinner, Araujo and her friend parted ways. As she walked home, Araujo realized she was out of cigarettes. The store she usually purchased them from was closed, so she stopped at Big Dan's Tavern to purchase cigarettes from the vending machine.

Reports differ on how long Araujo was in the bar before the assault, but she apparently had a drink and socialized with another patron she knew, played the jukebox, and then watched some men playing pool at the back of the tavern. After the other woman left, one of the men locked the front door, leaving Araujo as the only woman in the bar. When she tried to return to the bar area to leave, Joseph Vieira and Daniel Silva attacked her and began tearing off her clothes. A third man grabbed her from behind and threw her onto a pool table. She was stripped nearly naked and several men raped her. According to Araujo's original report to police, she heard people "laughing, cheering, yelling,” but no one responded to her cries for help. Bartender Carlos Machado testified that when he tried to call the police, Virgilio Medeiros blocked his access to the phone, and that other bar patrons were too intimidated to intervene.

Araujo's initial statements that there was a crowd of men cheering on the rapists was called into question at the trial. Initial police accounts that there were "12–15 jeering" onlookers were widely reported by the media and led to public outrage, though there were only ten people in the bar during the attack: the victim, the six defendants, the bartender, a patron who tried to call the police, and a sleeping drunk. Araujo admitted at trial that in light of the trauma of the assault she could not be sure how many men were in the bar, but that she did hear cheering. Indeed, one of the men present testified that he shouted "Go for it! Go for it!" during the attack.

The assault lasted two hours before Araujo managed to fight off her attackers, fleeing the bar in only a ripped pink sweater and a single sock. As she ran out into the street screaming that she had been raped, three college students passing by in a truck came upon the terrified woman. One of the passengers, Michael O'Neill, shouted "naked girl in street, naked girl in street" as Araujo ran in front of the vehicle. According to Michael's brother Daniel, she was standing in front of their truck "like a deer in the headlights." Crying and fearful, Araujo threw her arms tightly around Daniel's neck, shaking inconsolably. Some of Araujo’s assailants followed her out of the bar, but retreated after seeing the men in the truck, who drove her to the nearest hospital.

== Prosecution ==
Four of the men, John Cordeiro, Victor Raposo, Daniel Silva, and Joseph Vieira, were charged with aggravated rape, while the other two, Virgilio Medeiros and Jose Medeiros (no relation), were charged with "joint enterprise,” which is encouraging an illegal act and not acting to stop it. Only two trials were conducted, one for the four men charged with aggravated rape, and one for the two men charged with joint enterprise. This was reportedly to avoid having the men testify against each other.

The three college students who drove Araujo to the hospital testified as to her state of terror when they encountered her. Defense attorneys questioned the victim about her personal life, suggesting she had invited or somehow deserved the attack. During live television coverage of the trial in the United States, the victim's name was broadcast even though victims' names were not typically released to the public in rape cases at the time. After allowing television coverage, the courts had the right to prevent disclosure of the woman's name but chose not to do so. The courts later admonished the press for releasing her name publicly.

Four of the defendants were convicted of aggravated rape and the other two were acquitted. Despite being sentenced to 6 to 12 years in prison, the men only served 6½ years.

== Issues with media coverage ==
The trials attracted international attention. People in the majority Portuguese community of New Bedford said the case was a catalyst for stirring ethnic discrimination and anti-immigrant sentiment. With some of the media's coverage being xenophobic in nature, the community was subjected to racist slurs and several witnesses testifying against the defendants received death threats. Larry Flynt's pornographic magazine Hustler distributed fabricated postcards with the caption, "Greetings from New Bedford, Massachusetts, The Portuguese Gang-Rape Capital of America" and depicted a nude woman lying on a pool table.

This case added to the debate of whether rape victims had a right to privacy because of the nature of the crime. The prosecutor said that he believed victims should be protected by having trials be closed, to protect their privacy. He said the publicity might discourage rape victims from trying to get justice. There was considerable controversy at the time over broadcasting the rape trial. The broadcasts received wide ratings. As one study later noted, "Publication of a rape victim's name severely invades the personal privacy interests of the victim and exposes the victim to a variety of social and psychological problems."

There was national debate about the issue of releasing the victim's name, and United States Senator Arlen Specter of Pennsylvania held subcommittee hearings on the issue of televised trials after the conclusion of this case. Supporters of broadcasting criminal trials said that newscasters should have used their editing capacity to delete Araujo's name. As noted by Peter Kaplan, Specter said, "Some hard thinking has to be done in protecting the rights of witnesses and defendants. ... If this could be achieved, it would be highly desirable to televise rape cases, child-abuse cases and other crimes." Other supporters also believed that it was important to show the judicial process.

Other concerns about media coverage of this case related to the press's repetition of the first police report, without adequate attribution. They published Araujo's initial account of a crowd cheering in the bar. It was found that there were fewer men in the tavern than she claimed; during the trial, she said the attack resulted in her being distraught and distorting the number. But the dramatic first account had staying power; it was repeated even after more factually accurate accounts were published and broadcast.

== Later life and death ==
Araujo was essentially ostracized in New Bedford. Shortly after the trial, she moved to Miami, Florida, along with her two daughters and their father—Araujo's high school sweetheart—to find anonymity. Araujo had entered school to become a secretary.

On December 14, 1986, around 4:46 p.m., Araujo was returning from a Christmas show in Tropical Park with her daughters when she lost control of her car and struck a cement utility pole on the driver's side door. Her 4-year-old daughter's arm was broken while her 6-year-old daughter suffered minor injuries. Araujo died from multiple injuries in the crash. She was 25 years old and was buried at Pine Grove Cemetery in New Bedford.

Initially, sources differed about what caused the crash. At first, in the days that followed the crash, the Associated Press reported that, according to the Florida Highway Patrol, "the cause of the crash was not known. Investigators [had] said alcohol or drugs were not involved." At the same time, The New York Times also reported that "Trooper Ed Rizera, who investigated the accident, [had] said that there was no apparent cause for the accident, but that there would be a further homicide investigation."

About one week later, some contradictory information came from United Press International and the Associated Press. Both news agencies now reported that Araujo allegedly was severely intoxicated at the moment of the crash. According to Valerie Rao of the Dade County medical examiner's office in Miami, Araujo "had a blood alcohol level nearly three times the level at which one is considered legally drunk when she lost control of her car in South Miami". According to the same source, officials revealed that Araujo "had spent more than half of the year" in a Miami detoxification center and a residential drug and alcohol abuse treatment program for women.

About two years later, an article in The Washington Post about alcoholism in women referred specifically to the case of Araujo, stating that alcohol had most likely been a determining factor in the crash.

== Legacy ==
The feature film drama The Accused (1988) was inspired by this case. It stars Jodie Foster, who won the Academy Award for Best Actress for her performance as the victim, and Kelly McGillis as an assistant district attorney prosecuting the case. During interviews related to the film, McGillis acknowledged that she had also survived an assault and rape. She discussed her long struggle to get over the attack, and her decision to talk about it in the hope of helping other victims.

In 2019, author Karen Curtis's book The Accuser: The True Story of the Big Dan's Gang Rape Victim was released. Curtis interviewed Araujo's daughters in 2006 and they remember a "white van ran them off the road". Curtis obtained the FHP accident report which confirmed the girls' story. The report is published in the book. Crash photos, including those of Araujo dead at the scene, are also published in the book along with the autopsy and toxicology reports. The Accuser also delves into the two rape trials that were covered by media from around the world with cameras in the courtroom and how Araujo was run out of town after the convictions. Curtis also published transcript excerpts from the Senate judiciary committee hearing convened after the trials which condemned the television coverage. The salacious testimony was broadcast during the middle of the day as children returned home from school.

In 2020, the Araujo case was featured as an episode of the Netflix documentary series Trial by Media; the episode "Big Dan's" explores the effect that the broadcasting of the trial had on Araujo, the New Bedford community, and American society at large.

== See also ==
- Cox Broadcasting Corp. v. Cohn (1975) upholds freedom of the press to publish information (including names of rape victims) obtained from public sources
