= Congregation B'nai Israel (Bridgeport, Connecticut) =

Reform synagogue in Bridgeport, Connecticut, US

- Hebrew: בני ישראל
- Location in Connecticut

Religion
- Affiliation: Reform Judaism
- Ecclesiastical or organizational status: Synagogue
- Leadership: Rabbi Evan Schultz; Rabbi Sarah Marion; Rabbi James Prosnit (Emeritus)
- Status: Active

Location
- Location: 2710 Park Avenue, Bridgeport, Connecticut
- Country: United States
- Interactive map of Congregation B'nai Israel
- Coordinates: 41°11′41″N 73°12′59″W

Architecture
- Architects: Leonard Asheim (1911); Percival Goodman (1958)
- Type: Synagogue
- Style: Craftsman (1911)
- Established: 1859 (as a congregation)
- Completed: 1911 (1100 Park Avenue); 1958 (2710 Park Avenue)

Website
- cbibpt.org

Congregation B'nai Israel (Hebrew: בני ישראל) is a Reform Jewish congregation and synagogue located at 2710 Park Avenue, in Bridgeport, Connecticut, in the United States.

It is the oldest Jewish congregation in Bridgeport and the third oldest in Connecticut.

== History ==
B'nai Israel was established by a group of German Jewish immigrants as an Orthodox synagogue in 1859. The congregation's first rabbi was A. Jacobs. B'nai Israel established a Hebrew school in 1863.

For its first fifty years, B'nai Israel did not have a permanent home. Its members met and prayed in one another's homes and in storefronts and lofts. In 1885, plans were made to erect a building for B'nai Israel. The building, designed by Leonard Asheim with a Craftsman–style interior, was completed in 1911, located at 1100 Park Avenue and known as the Park Avenue Temple.

By 1911, when the Park Avenue Temple was completed, B'nai Israel had moved from Orthodox to Reform Judaism. Members who were unhappy with the changes left B'nai Israel and founded two of Bridgeport's other synagogues: Adath Israel (Orthodox) and Rodeph Sholom (Conservative).

After World War II, B'nai Israel outgrew its building and a second structure, called the Second Park Avenue Temple, was erected, designed by the prolific synagogue architect Percival Goodman, located at 2710 Park Avenue. Goodman commissioned artist Larry Rivers to create a Torah ark cloth for the new building, but Rivers' design was ultimately rejected and his work ended up in the collection of the Jewish Museum in New York City.

The former synagogue building at 1100 Park Avenue has been repurposed as a Baptist church, called the New Hope Missionary Baptist Church. This 1100 Park Avenue building was one of fifteen Connecticut synagogues added to the National Register of Historic Places in 1995 and 1996 in response to an unprecedented multiple submission, nominating nineteen synagogues.

== Recent history ==
In 2002, the temple drew attention (including an article in The New York Times) after its large junior choir, directed by Cantor Sheri Blum, recorded a CD with Cantor Bruce Benson entitled The Rock Service, Featuring Cantor Bruce Benson and the Jazz Service. This album was described as combining "original rock music with liturgically accurate chants," and was reportedly in contention for a Grammy nomination. (Note: Benson, later the cantor at Congregation Beth Israel, in Scottsdale, Arizona, also recorded a jazz service with Kenny G.)

In 2009 the temple, having recently renovated and expanded its building, celebrated its 150th anniversary. As of 2009, 700 families belonged to Congregation B'nai Israel and approximately 400 students were enrolled in its religious school.

== Notable members ==
- Craig Breslow, a major league baseball player and executive, and his family
