= Buddy Foster =

Former American child actor (born 1957)

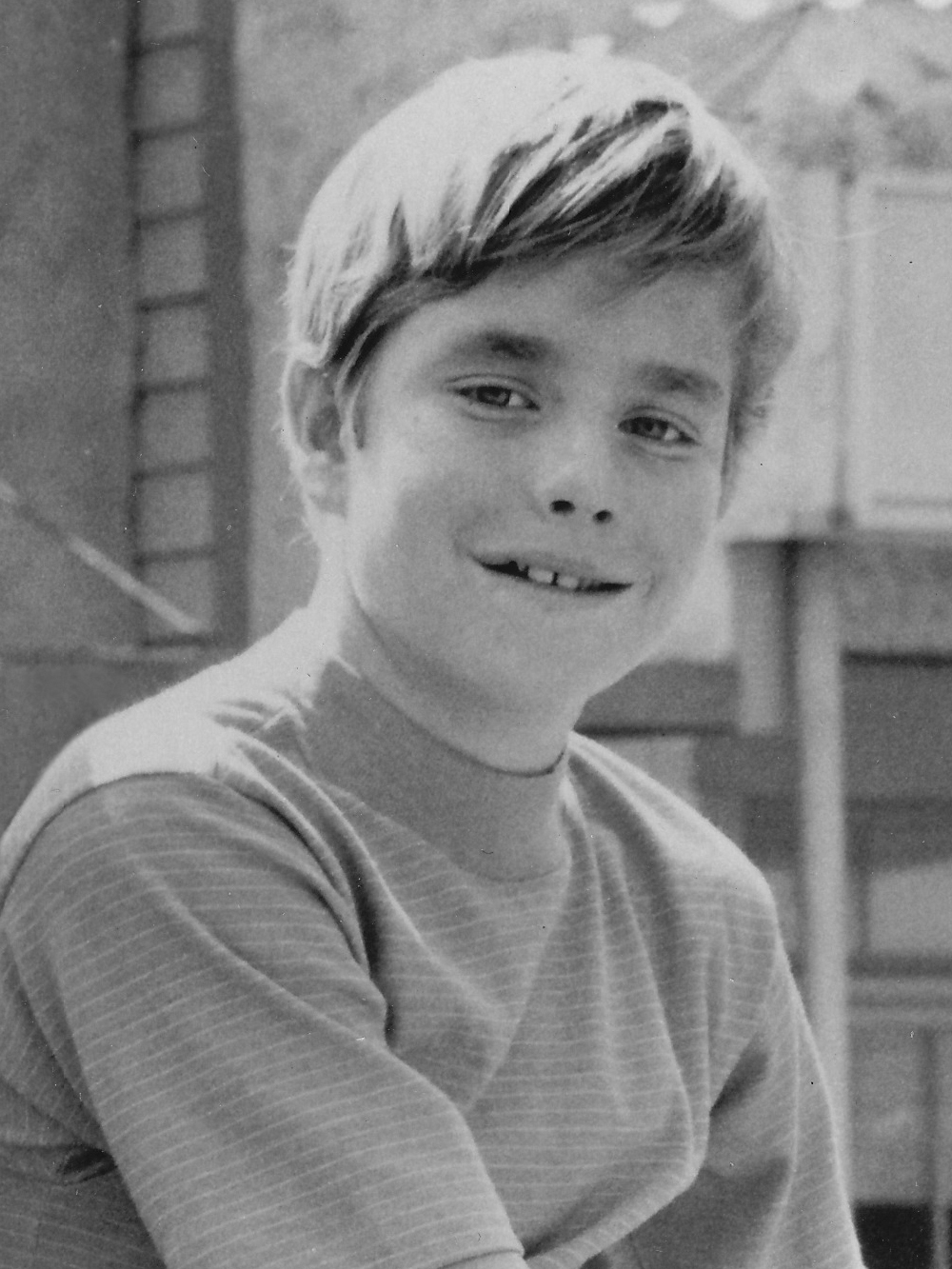
- Foster c. 1970
- Born: Lucius Fisher Foster IV; July 12, 1957 (age 68); Los Angeles, California, U.S.
- Occupation: Actor
- Years active: 1966–1980
- Children: 2
- Relatives: Jodie Foster (sister); Alexandra Hedison (sister-in-law); Charlie B. Foster (nephew)

Lucius Fisher "Buddy" Foster IV (born July 12, 1957) is an American former child actor. He is the older brother of actress and director Jodie Foster. Beginning his career at the age of eight, he had television roles from the late 1960s through the early 1970s, most notably Mayberry R.F.D. (1968–1971).

== Early life ==
Lucius Fisher Foster IV was born in Los Angeles, California, on July 12, 1957, the son of Evelyn (née Almond) and Lucius Fisher Foster III. He has two older sisters and one younger sister, actress Jodie Foster. His parents divorced in the early 1960s, and his mother obtained a job in the entertainment industry to support her children.

== Career ==
In the early 1960s, Evelyn Almond Foster began managing the career of her son Buddy Foster.

"Buddy, the first to start acting, lost a Coppertone commercial when 4-year-old Jodie charmed the casting director and got the job."

As a child actor, Foster appeared in a regular role on the 1967 TV western Hondo and Mayberry, R.F.D. (1968–1971), as well as appearing guest roles on numerous other television series throughout the late 1960s and 1970s including Land of the Giants, and The Six Million Dollar Man. He appeared on the Dragnet TV series in the 1969 episode "Burglary Auto: Juvenile Genius" as James "Watermelon" Chambers.

In 1967, Foster appeared on Petticoat Junction in the episode "Temperance, Temperance", as Clint Priddy. He voiced the little boy in the famous 1969 Tootsie Pop commercial Mr. Owl "How Many Licks Does It Take?", often miscredited to fellow child actor Peter Robbins. (Note: Peter Robbins is the young voice actor who portrayed Charlie Brown in the 1960s animated "Peanuts" movies.) He made his final screen appearance with a small role in the film Foxes (1980) starring his sister Jodie Foster.

In 1997, Foster released the book Foster Child, in which he chronicled his childhood. The book saw Foster allege that Jodie was a lesbian or bisexual, many years before she came out, and claim that their mother had once had a same-sex relationship. Jodie called the book a "cheap cry for attention and money, filled with hazy recollections, fantasies, and borrowed press releases [...] Buddy has done nothing but break our mother's heart his whole life".

In October 1997, Foster owned a construction company in Duluth, Minnesota, where he lived with his second wife.
