= Hedison =

Hedison is a surname. Notable people with the surname include:

- Alexandra Hedison (born 1969), American photographer, director, and actress
- David Hedison (1927–2019), American actor
