= List of accolades received by Eighth Grade =

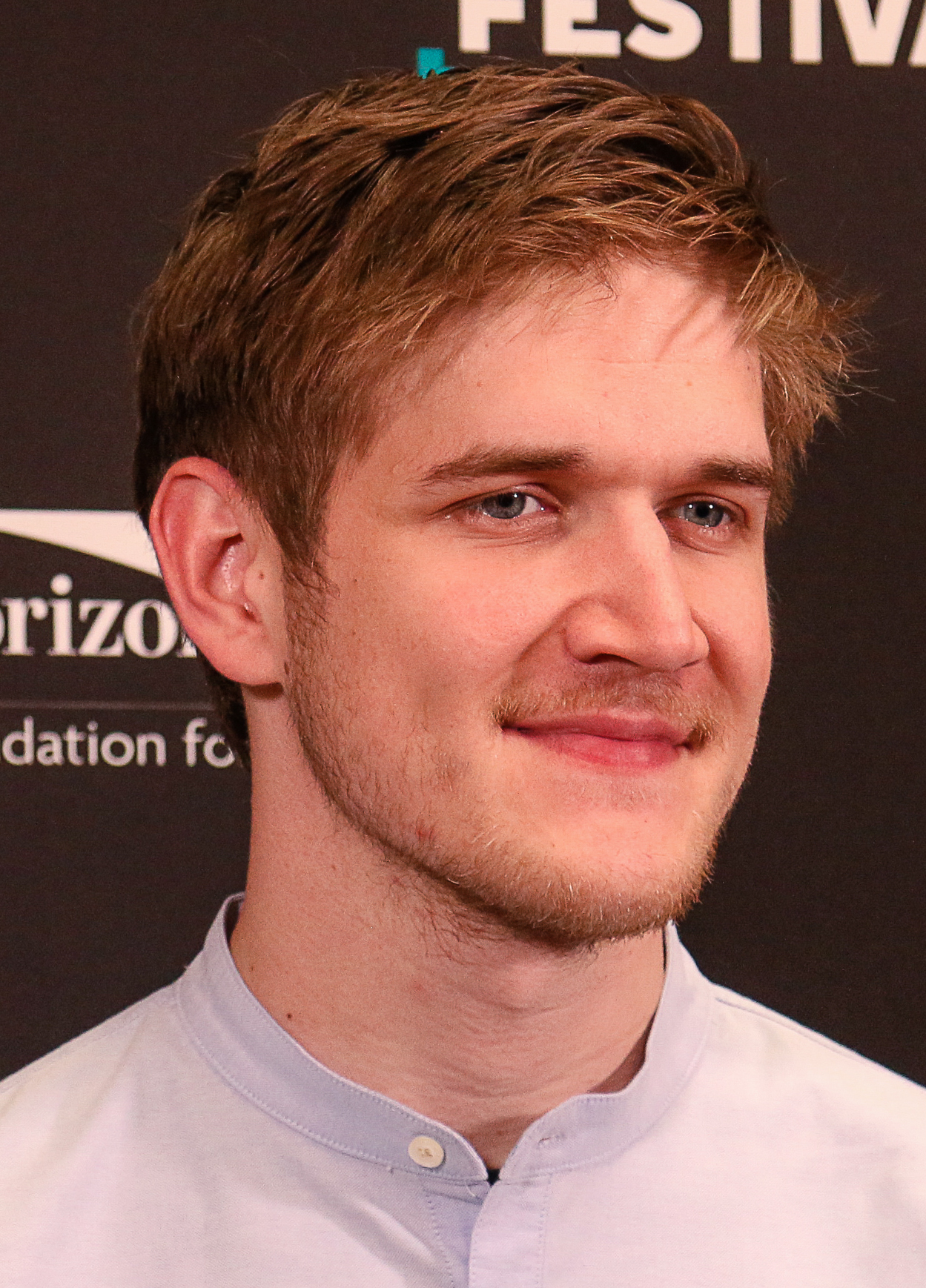
- Director and screenwriter Bo Burnham received numerous awards and nominations.
Accolades
Award	Won	Nominated
Alliance of Women Film Journalists	0	2
American Film Institute	1	1
Austin Film Critics Association	2	5
Boston Society of Film Critics	1	1
Chicago Film Critics Association	1	3
Critics' Choice Movie Awards	1	3
Dallas–Fort Worth Film Critics Association	0	1
Detroit Film Critics Society	3	8
Directors Guild of America	1	1
Florida Film Critics Circle	2	3
Georgia Film Critics Association	2	4
Golden Globes Awards	0	1
Golden Trailer Awards	0	1
Gotham Independent Film Awards	2	3
Guild of Music Supervisors Awards	1	1
Heartland Film Festival	1	1
Houston Film Critics Society	0	2
Independent Spirit Awards	1	4
IndieWire Critics Poll	0	1
National Board of Review	2	2
New York Film Critics Circle	1	1
New York Film Critics Online	3	3
Online Film Critics Society	0	3
San Diego Film Critics Society	1	5
San Francisco Film Critics Circle	0	1
San Francisco International Film Festival	1	1
Santa Barbara International Film Festival	1	1
Satellite Awards	0	3
Seattle Film Critics Society	1	1
Seattle International Film Festival	2	2
St. Louis Film Critics Association	0	1
Sundance London Film Festival	1	1
Toronto Film Critics Association	0	1
Vancouver Film Critics Circle	0	1
Washington D.C. Area Film Critics Association	1	2
Women Film Critics Circle	2	2
Writers Guild of America Awards	1	1
- Total number of awards and nominations
Totals	36	78
- References

Eighth Grade is a 2018 American comedy-drama film written and directed by Bo Burnham. It is his feature film directorial debut. The plot follows the life and struggles of an eighth-grader, played by Elsie Fisher, during her last week of classes before graduating to high school. She struggles with anxiety in social situations but produces video blogs giving life advice. A24 gave Eighth Grade its limited release on July 13, before moving it to wide release August 3.

On the review aggregator Rotten Tomatoes, the film holds an approval rating of 99% based on 217 reviews, with an average rating of 8.9/10. The website's critical consensus reads, "Eighth Grade takes a look at its titular time period that offers a rare and resounding ring of truth while heralding breakthroughs for writer-director Bo Burnham and captivating star Elsie Fisher." On Metacritic, the film has a weighted average score of 89 out of 100, based on 46 critics, indicating "universal acclaim". Eighth Grade completed its North American run grossing $13.5 million on a $2 million budget.

The film was entered into competition for the Grand Jury Prize at the 2018 Sundance Film Festival. It had a leading number of nominations (after We the Animals) at the Independent Spirit Awards with four, including Best Film. Fisher received their first Golden Globe nomination for the film, but the film was not nominated for Best Motion Picture – Musical or Comedy despite reporter Kyle Buchanan considering it to be A24's best candidate for the category.

== Accolades ==
Award	Date of ceremony	Category	Recipient(s)	Result	Ref(s)
Alliance of Women Film Journalists	January 10, 2019	Best Original Screenplay	Bo Burnham	Nominated	
Alliance of Women Film Journalists	January 10, 2019	Best Breakthrough Performance	Elsie Fisher	Nominated	
American Film Institute	January 4, 2019	Top Ten Films of the Year	Eighth Grade	Won	
Austin Film Critics Association	January 7, 2019	Best Original Screenplay	Bo Burnham	Nominated	
Austin Film Critics Association	January 7, 2019	Best Actress	Elsie Fisher	Nominated	
Austin Film Critics Association	January 7, 2019	Best First Film	Bo Burnham	Won	
Austin Film Critics Association	January 7, 2019	Breakthrough Artist	Elsie Fisher	Nominated	
Austin Film Critics Association	January 7, 2019	Special Honorary Award	Bo Burnham, Elsie Fisher, Josh Hamilton	Won	
Boston Society of Film Critics	December 16, 2018	Best New Filmmaker	Bo Burnham	Won	
Chicago Film Critics Association	December 8, 2018	Best Original Screenplay	Bo Burnham	Nominated	
Chicago Film Critics Association	December 8, 2018	Most Promising Filmmaker	Bo Burnham	Nominated	
Chicago Film Critics Association	December 8, 2018	Most Promising Performer	Elsie Fisher	Won	
Critics' Choice Movie Awards	January 13, 2019	Best Original Screenplay	Bo Burnham	Nominated	
Critics' Choice Movie Awards	January 13, 2019	Best Actress in a Comedy	Elsie Fisher	Nominated	
Critics' Choice Movie Awards	January 13, 2019	Best Young Performer	Elsie Fisher	Won	
Dallas–Fort Worth Film Critics Association	December 17, 2018	Best Picture	Eighth Grade	9th Place	
Detroit Film Critics Society	December 3, 2018	Best Film	Eighth Grade	Won	
Detroit Film Critics Society	December 3, 2018	Best Director	Bo Burnham	Nominated	
Detroit Film Critics Society	December 3, 2018	Best Actress	Elsie Fisher	Nominated	
Detroit Film Critics Society	December 3, 2018	Best Supporting Actor	Josh Hamilton	Won	
Detroit Film Critics Society	December 3, 2018	Best Ensemble	Cast	Nominated	
Detroit Film Critics Society	December 3, 2018	Breakthrough	Bo Burnham	Won	
Detroit Film Critics Society	December 3, 2018	Breakthrough	Elsie Fisher	Nominated	
Detroit Film Critics Society	December 3, 2018	Best Screenplay	Bo Burnham	Nominated	
Directors Guild of America	February 2, 2019	First-Time Feature Film	Bo Burnham	Won	
Florida Film Critics Circle	December 21, 2018	Best Original Screenplay	Bo Burnham	Runner-up	
Florida Film Critics Circle	December 21, 2018	Best First Film	Bo Burnham	Won	
Florida Film Critics Circle	December 21, 2018	Breakout	Elsie Fisher	Won	
Georgia Film Critics Association	2019	Best Picture	Eighth Grade	Nominated	
Georgia Film Critics Association	2019	Best Actress	Elsie Fisher	Nominated	
Georgia Film Critics Association	2019	Best Original Screenplay	Bo Burnham	Won	
Georgia Film Critics Association	2019	Breakthrough	Elsie Fisher	Won	
Golden Globes	January 6, 2019	Best Actress – Motion Picture, Musical or Comedy	Elsie Fisher	Nominated	
Golden Trailer Awards	May 29, 2019	Best Viral Campaign	A24, GrandSon	Nominated	
Gotham Awards	November 26, 2018	Breakthrough Director	Bo Burnham	Won	
Gotham Awards	November 26, 2018	Breakthrough Actor	Elsie Fisher	Won	
Gotham Awards	November 26, 2018	Audience Award	Eighth Grade	Nominated	
Guild of Music Supervisors Awards	February 13, 2019	Best Music Supervision for Films Budgeted Under 5 Million Dollars	Joe Rudge	Won	
Heartland Film Festival	October 11 – 21, 2018	Truly Moving Picture Award	Eighth Grade	Won	
Houston Film Critics Society	January 3, 2019	Best Picture	Eighth Grade	Nominated	
Houston Film Critics Society	January 3, 2019	Best Screenplay	Bo Burnham	Nominated	
Independent Spirit Awards	February 23, 2019	Best Film	Eli Bush, Scott Rudin, Christopher Storer, Lila Yacoub	Nominated	
Independent Spirit Awards	February 23, 2019	Best Female Lead	Elsie Fisher	Nominated	
Independent Spirit Awards	February 23, 2019	Best Supporting Male	Josh Hamilton	Nominated	
Independent Spirit Awards	February 23, 2019	Best First Screenplay	Bo Burnham	Won	
IndieWire Critics Poll	December 2018	Best First Feature	Bo Burnham	2nd Place	
National Board of Review	November 27, 2018	Top Ten Films	Eighth Grade	Won	
National Board of Review	November 27, 2018	Best Directorial Debut	Bo Burnham	Won	
New York Film Critics Circle	January 2019	Best First Film	Bo Burnham	Won	
New York Film Critics Online	December 9, 2018	Debut as Director	Bo Burnham	Won	
New York Film Critics Online	December 9, 2018	Breakthrough Performer	Elsie Fisher	Won	
New York Film Critics Online	December 9, 2018	Top 10	Eighth Grade	Won	
Online Film Critics Society	January 2, 2019	Best Picture	Eighth Grade	8th Place	
Online Film Critics Society	January 2, 2019	Best Original Screenplay	Bo Burnham	Nominated	
Online Film Critics Society	January 2, 2019	Best Debut Feature	Bo Burnham	Nominated	
San Diego Film Critics Society	December 10, 2018	Best Director	Bo Burnham	Nominated	
San Diego Film Critics Society	December 10, 2018	Best Original Screenplay	Bo Burnham	Won	
San Diego Film Critics Society	December 10, 2018	Best Actress	Elsie Fisher	Nominated	
San Diego Film Critics Society	December 10, 2018	Best Breakout Artist	Elsie Fisher	Nominated	
San Diego Film Critics Society	December 10, 2018	Best Breakout Artist	Bo Burnham	Nominated	
San Francisco Film Critics Circle	December 9, 2018	Best Original Screenplay	Bo Burnham	Nominated	
San Francisco International Film Festival	April 4 – 17, 2018	Best Narrative Feature	Bo Burnham	Won	
Santa Barbara International Film Festival	February 5, 2019	Virtuoso Award	Elsie Fisher	Won	
Satellite Awards	February 17, 2019	Best Actress – Motion Picture, Comedy or Musical	Elsie Fisher	Nominated	
Satellite Awards	February 17, 2019	Best Original Screenplay	Bo Burnham	Nominated	
Satellite Awards	February 17, 2019	Best Independent Film	A24	Nominated	
Seattle Film Critics Society	December 17, 2018	Best Youth Performance	Elsie Fisher	Won	
Seattle International Film Festival	May 17 – June 10, 2018	Best Film	Bo Burnham	Won	
Seattle International Film Festival	May 17 – June 10, 2018	Best Actress	Elsie Fisher	Won	
St. Louis Film Critics Association	December 16, 2018	Best Original Screenplay	Bo Burnham	Nominated	
Sundance London Film Festival	May 31 – June 3, 2018	Audience Favourite	Bo Burnham	Won	
Toronto Film Critics Association	December 9, 2018	Best First Feature	Bo Burnham	Runner-up	
Vancouver Film Critics Circle	December 17, 2018	Best Screenplay	Bo Burnham	Nominated	
Washington D.C. Area Film Critics Association	December 3, 2018	Best Breakthrough Performance	Elsie Fisher	Won	
Washington D.C. Area Film Critics Association	December 3, 2018	Best Original Screenplay	Bo Burnham	Nominated	
Women Film Critics Circle	December 21, 2018	Best Family Film	Eighth Grade	Won	
Women Film Critics Circle	December 21, 2018	Best Young Actress	Elsie Fisher	Won	
Writers Guild of America Awards	February 17, 2019	Best Original Screenplay	Bo Burnham	Won	
