= Jane Paknia =

American synthesizer player and composer

- Born: November 30, 2000 (age 25)
- Education: Columbia University
- Occupation: Musician
- Musical career
- Origin: New York City
- Genres: Dance-pop; electronic jazz
- Instrument: Synthesizer
- Label: Eat Your Own Ears

Jane Rosalyn Paknia (born November 30, 2000) is an American synthesizer player and composer from New York City. An accomplished trumpeter in her teenage years, her music in adulthood primarily focuses on dance-pop and electronic jazz. Her debut EP, Orchid Underneath, was released in 2024, and her second, Millions of Years of Longing, was released in 2025.

== Early life and education ==
Jane Rosalyn Paknia was born on November 30, 2000. (Note: On November 30, 2024, Paknia posted that it was her birthday on her Instagram page. In an article in The Guardian, dated April 19, 2025, she was said to be 24 years old.) Paknia was taught piano by her Iranian grandmother beginning at age 5, and started studying trumpet at 13. While a student at Weston High School in Weston, Connecticut, she was the principal trumpet in the Greater Bridgeport Youth Orchestras's Principal Orchestra, and winner of the GBYO's Concerto Competition. Paknia later attended Columbia University, from which she graduated in 2022, and where she met and collaborated with singer Sarah Kinsley.

== Career ==
Paknia released her debut EP, Orchid Underneath, on April 26, 2024, via Eat Your Own Ears Recordings. South African collective John Wizards remixed the song "Glimmers", and Hagop Tchaparian remixed the title track, with the latter remix being named the 88th best song of 2024 by Pitchfork.

Paknia's second EP, Millions of Years of Longing, was released on June 6, 2025, by Eat Your Own Ears. Three singles were released from the EP: "Solace", an electronica song which Paknia dedicated to her inspirations Sophie and Alice Coltrane, came out on March 11; "Waiting Pt 1", written in 2022 and based on a "Bach-like chord progression", was released on April 15; and "The Dream Is This", released on May 13, which was inspired by a dream of Elmo dying. Both "Waiting Pt 1" and "The Dream Is This" were ranked among Stereogum's top five songs released in their respective weeks. "Solace" was featured at #1 on the Guardian's weekly playlist, and Paknia was featured in their "One to Watch" article series. The Guardian's Laura Snapes compared the "addictive" EP to the music of Max Tundra, Jockstrap, and the record label Brainfeeder. Still Listening's Eliot Odgers called the EP "one of the strongest and most confident EPs of 2025 so far" and "exciting, innovative work from an artist with a clear vision and serious skill." The Quietus's Anna Rahkonen called the album an inventive and exploratory sophomore effort, covering vast sonic ground across electronic, pop, and jazz-fusion."

In 2026, Paknia composed the score for the independent film Sparks, which premiered on March 12, 2026, at South by Southwest.

== Style ==
In a piece written for Talkhouse, Paknia explained her own musical style and how she came to it. During her freshman year at Columbia, her trumpet abilities "strangely disintegrated", and after a low emotional point, she returned to piano and singing. In that time, she had the idea to play the synthesizer in combination with a digital audio workstation. Her friend offered her a playlist full of dance-pop music, leading her into a dance-pop fixation which she decided to combine with her interests in contemporary jazz and electronic music into a style she referred to as electronic jazz.

== Personal life ==
As of 2025, Paknia lives in New York City.

== Discography ==
=== EPs ===
- Orchid Underneath (2024, Eat Your Own Ears)
- Millions of Years of Longing (2025, Eat Your Own Ears)

=== Singles ===
- "Solace" (2025, Millions of Years of Longing)
- "Waiting Pt 1" (2025, Millions of Years of Longing)
- "The Dream Is This" (2025, Millions of Years of Longing)
