= Charlie B. Foster =

American actor

- Born: Charles Bernard Foster; July 20, 1998 (age 28); Los Angeles, California
- Education: Yale University
- Years active: 2022–present
- Parents: Jodie Foster (mother); Cydney Bernard (mother); Alexandra Hedison (stepmother)
- Relatives: Bob Balaban (uncle); Buddy Foster (uncle); David Hedison (grandfather); Jay Kanter (grandfather); Bob Thiele Jr. (uncle); Owen Thiele (cousin)

Charles Bernard Foster (born 20 July 1998) is an American actor. He (Note: Foster identifies as non-binary and uses both he/him and they/them pronouns. This article uses he/him for consistency.) is best known for starring in the independent film Sparks (2026), which premiered at South by Southwest, and his role as Wingo in the Amazon Prime series Scarpetta (2026).

== Early life and education ==
=== Family ===
Foster was born and raised in Los Angeles, California, the elder child of actress Jodie Foster and her then-partner, production manager Cydney Bernard. Both Foster and his younger brother Kit, a chemist, are Jodie's biological children. His biological father's identity has not been made public. In 2014, after splitting from Bernard, Jodie married photographer and filmmaker Alexandra Hedison.

=== Education ===
Foster attended the Windward School in Los Angeles and graduated in 2017. He attended Yale University to study English. Foster was an active participant in campus theatre productions, starring in musicals such as Spring Awakening, Pippin, The Rocky Horror Show, The Last Five Years, and American Idiot.

== Career ==
After Yale, Foster moved to New York City. His first professional acting role was as an understudy in the off-Broadway premiere of Bess Wohl's Camp Siegfried at Second Stage's Tony Kiser Theater in 2022. His television debut came later that year with a guest role on the HBO sitcom The Garcias.

From 2023 to 2025, Foster primarily worked as a voice actor for audio dramas, including Popcorn for Dinner, Supreme: The Battle for Roe, The Coldest Case: The Past Has a Long Memory, and The Peek with Samuel Pepys.

In 2026, Foster had a recurring role in Scarpetta, an Amazon Prime series starring Nicole Kidman and Jamie Lee Curtis. He also made his feature film debut starring in the independent film Sparks, which premiered at the 2026 South by Southwest festival. Foster's role in the film received positive reviews, with The Hollywood Reporter calling his performance "star-making."

== Personal life ==
Foster identifies as non-binary and uses both he/him and they/them pronouns.

== Credits ==
Film
Year	Title	Role	Notes
2023	Nyad	Bikini Boyfriend	Uncredited; scenes deleted
2026	Sparks	Antoine	

Television
Year	Title	Role	Notes
2022	The Garcias	Kit	Episode: "Back to the Roots"
2025	Scarpetta	Wingo	Recurring role; 4 episodes

Theatre
Year	Title	Role	Venue	Category
2022	Camp Siegfried	Boy (understudy)	Tony Kiser Theater	Off-Broadway

Other media
Year	Title	Role	Medium	Notes
2023	Popcorn for Dinner	Michael	Podcast	Main role
2024	Supreme: The Battle for Roe	Charlie	Podcast	Recurring role; 3 episodes
2024	The Coldest Case: The Past Has a Long Memory	Additional voices	Podcast	Recurring role; 3 episodes
2025	The Peek with Samuel Pepys	Valentino	Podcast	Main Role
