= Eighth Grade (film) =

2018 film by Bo Burnham

- Theatrical release poster
- Directed by: Bo Burnham
- Written by: Bo Burnham
- Produced by: Scott Rudin; Eli Bush; Lila Yacoub; Christopher Storer
- Starring: Elsie Fisher; Josh Hamilton; Emily Robinson; Jake Ryan; Fred Hechinger
- Cinematography: Andrew Wehde
- Edited by: Jennifer Lilly
- Music by: Anna Meredith
- Production companies: A24; IAC Films; Scott Rudin Productions
- Distributed by: A24
- Release dates: January 19, 2018 (Sundance); July 13, 2018 (United States)
- Running time: 94 minutes
- Country: United States
- Language: English
- Budget: $2 million
- Box office: $14.3 million

Eighth Grade is a 2018 American coming-of-age film written and directed by Bo Burnham. It follows a teenager (Elsie Fisher) who struggles with anxiety but strives to gain social acceptance from her school peers during their final week of eighth grade, and copes by publishing apparently motivational vlogs despite spending much of her time obsessing over social media.

Burnham began writing the screenplay in 2014, initially in an attempt to reflect on his own anxiety and onstage panic attacks he experienced during his stand-up comedy career. Deciding to convey his experience through the protagonist, he also wanted to explore how her generation copes with mental illness, grows up with social media, navigates sexuality and consent, relates to their parents, and develops self-awareness. He aimed for realism, casting actual eighth graders—including Fisher—who influenced his writing and directing. For research, he watched vlogs from teenagers on YouTube, where he also discovered Fisher. On a budget of $2 million, the film was shot over one month in mid-2017 in the New York locations Suffern, West Nyack, and White Plains.

Eighth Grade premiered at the 2018 Sundance Film Festival on January 19 and was given a wide theatrical release in the United States by A24 on July 13. The film was rated R by the MPAA; instead of appealing this decision, A24 and Burnham arranged free all-ages theatrical screenings in every U.S. state to let the intended audience see it.

The film was a critical and commercial success, grossing $14 million domestically. It earned numerous awards and nominations, with Burnham winning both Writers Guild and Directors Guild of America Awards, and Fisher being nominated for the Golden Globe Award for Best Actress – Motion Picture Musical or Comedy and winning the Gotham Award for Breakthrough Actor. The National Board of Review and the American Film Institute each named Eighth Grade as one of the 10 best films of 2018, with the former also naming it the year's best directorial debut.

== Plot ==
Eighth grader Kayla Day is in her final week at Miles Grove Middle School, a public middle school in a small New York town. She posts motivational vlogs on YouTube about confidence and self-image that receive few to no views. Timid and struggling to make friends at school, she is voted "Most Quiet" by her classmates. Meanwhile, her single father, Mark, struggles to connect with her and break her reliance on social media. Kayla is invited to popular classmate Kennedy's pool party by Kennedy's mother. At the party, she has a panic attack in the bathroom, but eventually goes outside to swim, where she meets Kennedy's nerdy cousin, Gabe. After trying to leave early, she has an awkward encounter with her crush, Aiden, who encourages her to stay. She overcomes her anxiety and volunteers to partake in karaoke.

After hearing that Aiden broke up with his last girlfriend because she refused to send him nude photos of herself, Kayla lies to Aiden and tells him that she has a folder of explicit photos of herself on her phone, piquing his interest. He asks if she gives blowjobs and she says yes, despite not knowing what he means. She later looks up instructions online and is disgusted by what she finds.

During a high school shadow program, Kayla meets a friendly senior named Olivia, who shows her around the school before exchanging phone numbers and inviting her to the mall with some friends. At the mall, Kayla is mortified to see her father spying on the group from afar and orders him to leave.

While giving Kayla a ride home, Olivia's friend, Riley, initiates an awkward and invasive game of truth or dare, culminating in him removing his shirt and encouraging her to do the same. When she refuses, he becomes angry and claims he was just trying to help her gain some sexual experience. At home, Kayla breaks down and is comforted by Mark. She makes another vlog announcing that she intends to stop making videos, as she is not the confident person she pretends to be and feels unfit to give advice. She opens a time capsule she created for herself in sixth grade and watches a video in which her past self asks about her current friends and love life. After enlisting Mark's help in burning the time capsule, she asks him if she makes him sad. He tells her that she fills him with pride and could never make him sad, prompting her to hug him.

Shortly before graduation, Kayla finally calls out Kennedy for acting indifferent and dismissive toward Kayla's attempts at befriending her. She later has dinner at Gabe's house and they enjoy their time together. Kayla makes a new time capsule that she and Mark bury in the backyard, and leaves a video message for her future high school senior self, encouraging her to persevere through tough times.

== Cast ==
- Elsie Fisher as Kayla Day
- Josh Hamilton as Mark Day
- Emily Robinson as Olivia
- Catherine Oliviere as Kennedy Graves
- Jake Ryan as Gabe
- Luke Prael as Aiden Wilson
- Daniel Zolghadri as Riley
- Fred Hechinger as Trevor
- Imani Lewis as Aniyah

== Themes ==
The film explores anxiety. Professor Julianna W. Miner, writing in 2018 about Eighth Grade, reflects that 22% of teenagers were struggling with depression and anxiety, and teenage girls were committing suicide at higher rates in 2015 than they were in the previous 40 years. The anxiety depicted is typical in middle school, but according to reporter Valerie Strauss, also reflects life in 2018 where people of all ages see a "cacophony of indifference and downright meanness". The words "um" and "like" in the screenplay also reflect "the process of struggling", rather than the characters' lack of intelligence.

Critic Owen Gleiberman wrote that Eighth Grade was a trailblazer in examining youth who never knew a world without the Internet, touching on sexting as well. CBS News also commented that besides "the usual teen angst and acne", Eighth Grade depicts how Kayla spends a great deal of time online and engaging in text messaging. This reflects general trends in Generation Z, in which 94% of youth have used smartphones by age 14. A 2018 U.S. poll found that 45% of teenagers reported being "almost constantly" online. 24% called its effects "mostly negative", while 45% characterized it as "neither negative nor positive".

Elsie Fisher said that "social media is almost religious" for Kayla. Burnham said, "Social media has made me think differently as a person [...] it's made me more anxious, I think." Professor Jean Twenge also connected an increase in Internet usage to a decline in juvenile mental health. Gleiberman called the depiction an examination of "overwhelming—and, I would argue, unprecedented—woe that teenagers today can feel". Author Robert Barker contrasted Eighth Grade to earlier coming-of-age films such as Fast Times at Ridgemont High (1982) and Mean Girls (2004). Rather than work through cliques, Barker wrote, Kayla and others are on "a digital war of all against all, preening, pretending, and pontificating as much to themselves as to an anonymous audience". Barker also saw the sexting between characters as representing their obliviousness to lost innocence. NPR interpreted the impact of the Internet during maturation as "one of the key subjects of Eighth Grade", commenting on how many people may not remember the age fondly, but social media has added complications. NPR added Kayla is still able to grow despite great challenges.

According to critic Kyle Buchanan, "The biggest mystery to ... [Kayla] is the opposite sex", considering her interest in Aiden and taking online lessons about fellatio. Journalist Chris O'Falt suggested Kayla is not truly ready for sex, but simply is "pressured to barter [her] sexuality for social acceptance". Time mentioned Kayla's claim to Aiden that she has nude selfies as among the "classic middle-school indignities" Eighth Grade depicts.

Burnham also criticized American sex education for not exploring sexual consent, as reflected in the "truth or dare" scene. Although Kayla is shown in a sex education class earlier in the film, she does not know how to react when Riley sexually coerces her, and apologizes to him for rejecting his advances. Film critics connected the scene with the Me Too movement, though it was written before the movement began. At festival screenings, moviegoers were visibly uncomfortable and yelled during the scene.

The story also explores Kayla's relationship with her father, a member of Generation X from whom she is breaking away, exhibiting typical behavior for her age. His attempts to communicate with her are frustrated by her fixation on her phone. Journalist Sonia Rao called Mark "the only constant presence in her life"; he is devoted to Kayla and tells her he is proud of her.

== Production ==
=== Development ===
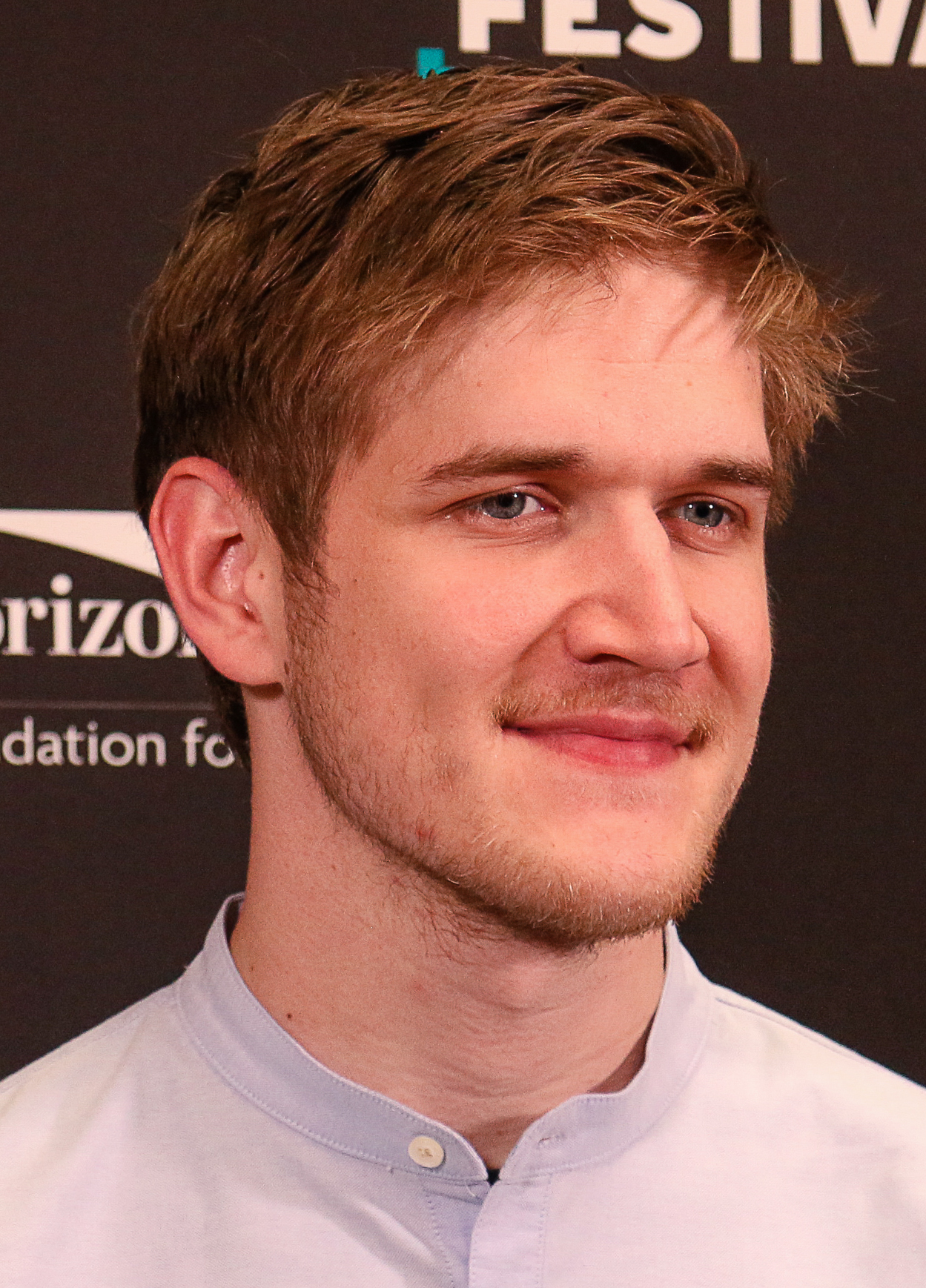
Bo Burnham said his anxieties inspired him to begin working on the screenplay in 2014

As a touring comedian since 2009, Bo Burnham began to suffer from panic attacks related to his performances in 2013. While his main intention was to write a story about anxiety, he chose the setting of eighth grade because of his perspective that "anxiety makes [him] feel like a terrified 13-year-old". He also reflected on his notion that eighth grade is a crucial year for forming self-awareness: "I wanted to talk about anxiety and what it feels like to be alive right now, and what it is to be unsure and nervous. That felt more like middle school than high school to me. I think the country and the culture is going through an eighth grade moment right now."

Burnham was also inspired by seeing a young girl in a mall taking selfies alone, leading him to believe she was concerned about her appearance. Given his career started with producing YouTube videos, he also wanted to explore the life of a character whose videos have very small audiences. Work on the screenplay began in 2014, under the working title of The Coolest Girl in the World. Kayla was not the sole protagonist in an initial draft of the screenplay, but Burnham decided to focus on her because her voice felt the truest. He decided the protagonist would be female after watching YouTube vlogs in which he observed that "the boys talk about Minecraft and the girls talk about their souls [...] probably half because girls are just actually maturing more quickly and half because culture asks way deeper questions of young women earlier than men". He also liked the idea of a female protagonist to avoid projecting his own personal memories of eighth grade as a male.

Burnham watched YouTube videos to help him write dialogue representing Generation Z. His personal views on the differences between Generation Z and its predecessors inspired a scene where the character of Trevor theorizes that access to social media at an early age molded the generation's minds. Kayla and Mark's relationship is based on Burnham's relationship with his mother. He viewed a teenager's relationship with their parent as a stage where "you want independence, and you also want affirmation".

Scott Rudin, Eli Bush, and A24 produced the movie on a $2 million budget. A24 executive Nicolette Aizenberg called Eighth Grade "personal" to her. Burnham spent years trying to secure financing for the film, confident that his success as a comedian would make him marketable to potential producers. Although he had not directed a feature film before, he was adamant about directing Eighth Grade, and spent the eight months leading up to the shoot reading books such as Sidney Lumet's Making Movies.

=== Casting ===
50 teenagers auditioned for the role of Kayla. Burnham discovered Elsie Fisher on YouTube and had her audition three times. Fisher, then 13, said she had struggled to find a part realistically depicting a teenager before auditioning for Eighth Grade. Burnham cast Fisher because she was "the only one who felt like a shy kid pretending to be confident [while] everyone else felt like a confident kid pretending to be shy". Fisher said she was apprehensive at the first audition as she was already a fan of Burnham's comedy. She was drawn to the part because Kayla's speech mannerisms are similar to hers. She graduated from eighth grade one week before production began. Upon reviewing the screenplay, her father shouted and swore while reading the "truth or dare" scene, but made sure Fisher was comfortable with the material.

Burnham considered Josh Hamilton to have a "dad vibe". Daniel Zolghadri was cast as Riley. Because of the "truth or dare" scene, many young actors who auditioned played the part as sinister, but Burnham coached Zolghadri to be "the opposite of creepy" for more realism. Emily Robinson and Imani Lewis were teenagers when cast, and both said they found the depiction of anxiety relatable. Jake Ryan, who played Gabe, remarked that Gabe "was supposed to be off-centered" in the screenplay; not knowing the meaning of this phrase, he played the character like himself.

Actual teachers and students at Suffern Middle School in New York were used as extras, with principal Brian Fox revealing that five to ten students were cast. During the audition process for the real-life eighth graders, one student said that having eczema was her "special talent" and another auditioned by "eating a bell pepper like an apple". Burnham accepted both. Band teacher Dave Yarrington said Burnham cast him because he "liked [his] look".

=== Filming ===
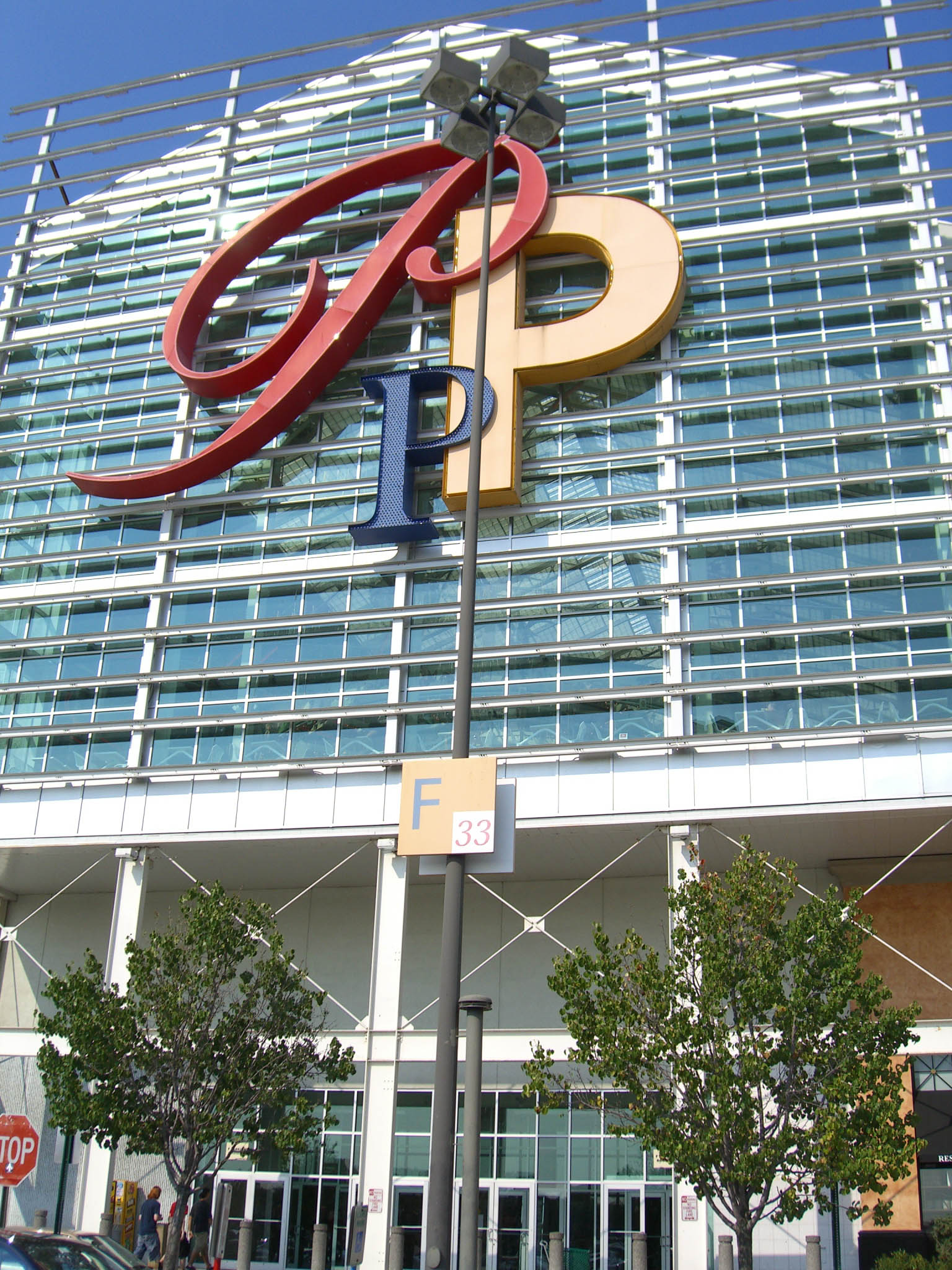
Filming took place at the exterior of the Palisades Center

The film was shot in Suffern, New York, in summer 2017, over 27 days, with filming at Suffern Middle School in July. For the mall scenes, exterior shots were taken at Palisades Center in West Nyack, New York, while interior scenes were shot at the Galleria in White Plains, New York.

Burnham chose not to obscure the natural look of Fisher's skin, who wore some makeup but whose acne was left visible. Kayla's use of the phrase "Gucci!" to sign-off her video blogs came from Fisher's habit of ending conversations this way, which was also imitated by Burnham and others on set. Fisher's other habits of slouching and rubbing her arm were also incorporated into Kayla's character. The filmmakers adopted Fisher's advice that "no one uses Facebook anymore" in regard to teenagers, and it was replaced in the film by Instagram. Beyond minor changes, improvisation was rarely employed.

To depict texting, Burnham rejected using visual effects to show messages as on-screen bubbles, as in House of Cards. He opted for a "practical" portrayal, filming the phones themselves. Kayla's video blogs were shot with an actual MacBook Pro. Because the actual Internet was depicted, production designer Sam Lisenco and prop designer Erica Severson created many false Instagram and Twitter accounts. The filmmakers primarily used Red Digital Cinema cameras and wide lenses, with Burnham favoring the use of camera zooming.

The "truth or dare" scene was shot with only eight crew members along with Fisher and Zolghadri. Fisher had the screenplay on her lap to read when their character was looking down. They explained, "We just wanted to take a sensitive approach and just be honest about this, and portray a type of toxic event that can happen." Because Fisher was underage when shooting the banana scene, it was similarly shot with minimal crew present.

=== Post-production ===
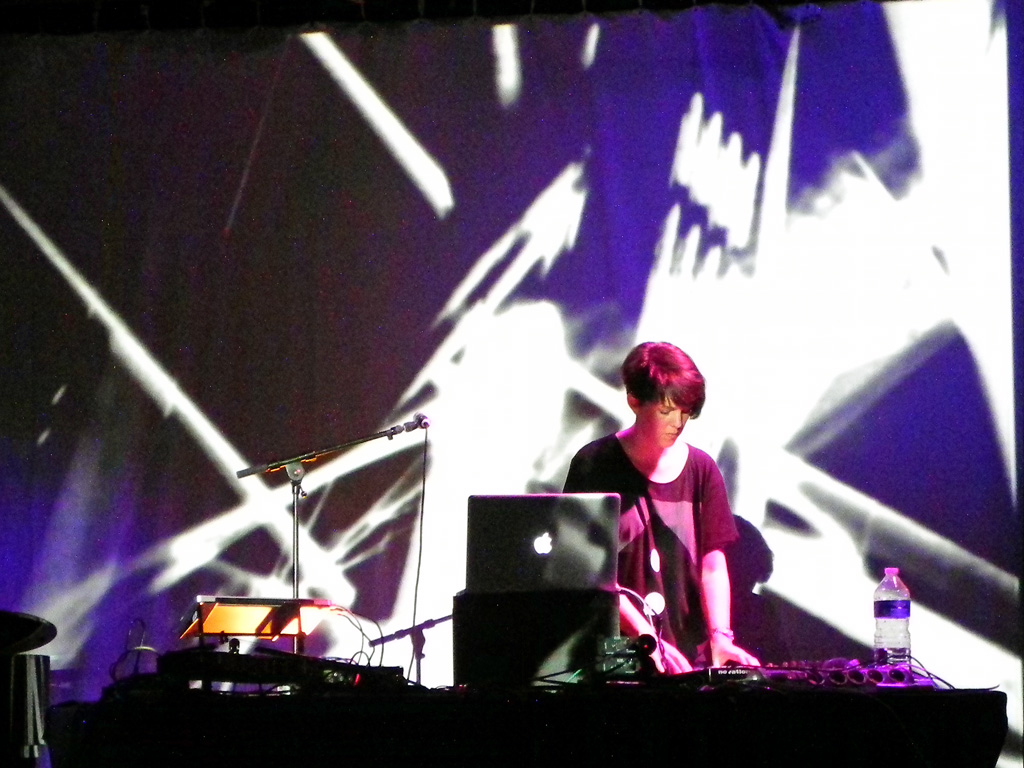
Scottish musician Anna Meredith created the film's score.

Burnham and editor Jennifer Lilly did not complete post-production until three days before the film's premiere at Sundance in January 2018. Audio of Fisher singing at age 11 in the English dub of Masha and the Bear was used in the film.

Scottish electronic composer and solo musician Anna Meredith wrote and recorded the film's score in her London studio. Deliberately avoiding a "cute" score, Burnham turned to electronic music because "Kayla's experience feels so intense to her," and chose Meredith since her style was unlike "a lot of electronic music ... very cold and masculine." As her first film score, Meredith described the process as a "challenge," emphasizing that as a composer, "you don't just present the music you want. You try to do what the film needs."

Burnham used "Orinoco Flow" by Irish musician Enya for a montage scene of Kayla browsing social media. He wanted to use the song to convey that the social media experience was "religious" and "spiritual" for Kayla, and wrote a letter to Enya for her permission to use the song, which she granted.

== Release ==
The film premiered in competition at the 2018 Sundance Film Festival on January 19, and was subsequently screened at the San Francisco International Film Festival in April. Eighth Grade also screened at the Seattle International Film Festival at its closing weekend in June 2018.

A24 gave Eighth Grade its limited release on July 13, before moving it to wide release August 3. The Motion Picture Association of America gave Eighth Grade an R rating for profanity and content about fellatio. Burnham had the option to edit the film to secure a more permissive PG-13 but chose not to do so, commenting, "It didn't feel like our responsibility to portray a reality that was appropriate for kids, but rather portray the reality that the kids are actually living in". Critics decried the MPAA's decision for denying teenage viewers a film with positive messages. MPAA representative Chris Ortman stated A24 never appealed the R rating, though having the right to do so. Burnham regretted the rating because it excluded middle school-aged youth. To get around the rating, A24 arranged one free, unrated screening in each U.S. state on August 8. Burnham approved of Canada's 14A rating. Eighth Grade began screening in Canadian cities on August 3.

In September 2018, Sony Pictures Worldwide Acquisitions acquired international distribution rights to the film. Lionsgate prepared the DVD and Blu-ray release in Region 1 with a director's commentary and deleted scenes, for distribution beginning October 9. The film was released in Belgium and the Netherlands in February 2019. United Kingdom and Irish releases occurred on April 26, 2019.

== Reception ==
=== Box office ===
Eighth Grade's opening weekend in four theaters beginning July 13 saw a gross of $252,284, an average of $63,071 per screen. It surpassed Wes Anderson's Isle of Dogs ($60,011) for the best per-screen average of 2018, and was in-turn surpassed by Free Solo ($75,201) at the end of September. Eighth Grade expanded to 33 theaters in its second weekend, grossing $794,370, and then made $1.3 million from 158 theaters in its third weekend. The film began its wide release on August 3 at 1,084 theaters, and earned $6.6 million by August 6.

By August 16 the film earned $10.5 million, the sixth-highest grossing independent domestic film of the summer. By September 26 it had grossed $13.5 million in North America. As of June 20, 2019 it has grossed $14.3 million worldwide.

=== Critical response ===
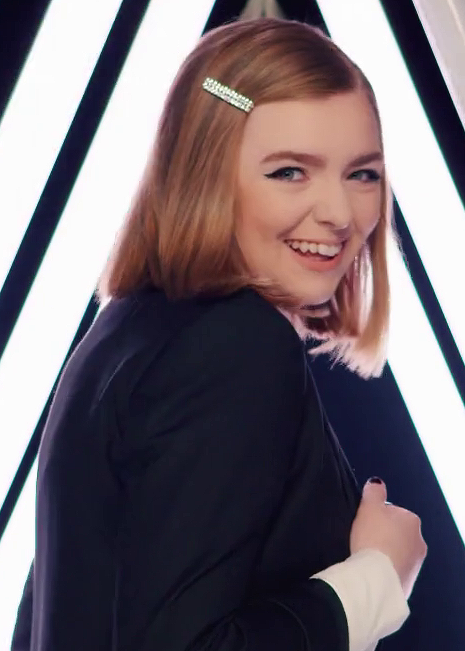
Elsie Fisher received critical acclaim for her performance as Kayla.

Eighth Grade received critical acclaim, particularly for Fisher's performance and Burnham's screenplay and direction. On the review aggregator Rotten Tomatoes, the film holds an approval rating of 99% based on 318 reviews, with an average rating of 8.8/10. The website's critical consensus reads, "Eighth Grade takes a look at its titular time period that offers a rare and resounding ring of truth while heralding breakthroughs for writer-director Bo Burnham and captivating star Elsie Fisher." On Metacritic, the film has a weighted average score of 85 out of 100, based on 49 critics, indicating "universal acclaim".

Richard Roeper of Chicago Sun-Times judged the film "sweet and intelligent" and credited Fisher for "an authentic and utterly natural performance". Ty Burr of The Boston Globe also cited Fisher for a performance showing "supreme awkwardness and not a shred of vanity" and Josh Hamilton for playing his part with "an empathetic cringe". The New York Times' Manohla Dargis cited Josh Hamilton as "note-perfect". Ann Hornaday of The Washington Post highlighted Fisher for "a raw, radiantly generous performance". Variety's Peter Debruge judged the film "achingly honest" but clichéd in having Kayla infatuated with one boy (played by Luke Prael) and ignoring a better love interest (played by Jake Ryan) until the later acts.

Peter Travers of Rolling Stone hailed Eighth Grade as "special and unique" for its "empathy", writing it is neutral on the Internet's effects on society but Kayla is addicted to electronics. For The New Yorker, Naomi Fry credited Eighth Grade with "queasy verisimilitude" and exploring the impact of social media on the lives of teenagers. Forbes contributor Dani Di Placido wrote the depiction of electronics was better than in most films, showing they were "powerful communicative tools that can isolate us, or bring us together, depending on how we choose to use them". Considering how Burnham first achieved notoriety on the Internet, Chicago Tribune critic Michael Phillips wrote Burnham was familiar with "the agitating seductions of our online lives".

In the Los Angeles Times, Justin Chang evaluated Eighth Grade as "sharp, sensitive and enormously affecting". Entertainment Weekly gave it an A, with Chris Nashawaty praising Burnham for capturing Kayla's anxiety and hopes, depicted "in all of their miraculous, cringeworthy, universal beauty". The A.V. Club named the scenes between Fisher and Hamilton to be among the "funniest, most poignant" scenes. SF Gate critic Peter Hartlaub wrote the comedy is combined with "pure social and sexual horror". Benjamin Lee commented on the score in The Guardian, writing the use of electronic music was unexpected but effective.

The actress Molly Ringwald, who performed in 1980s coming-of-age dramas, wrote that Eighth Grade was perhaps the best film about adolescence she had ever seen. Heidi Stevens of Chicago Tribune contrasted the depiction of consent in Eighth Grade to that in John Hughes' The Breakfast Club (1985), which Ringwald starred in, concluding Burnham's film was more updated. Eighth Grade has been favorably compared with Hughes' filmography generally.

Adam Chitwood wrote a mixed review on Collider, calling Eighth Grade "a rough draft" that needed editing to convey its points. Richard Brody in The New Yorker wrote it was let down by "sentiment, stereotypes, and good intentions", and despite Fisher's performance, "Kayla remains merely a collection of traits". The Missoula Independent's Molly Laich compared the realism to being "drilled at the dentist".

=== Accolades ===
Eighth Grade was entered into competition for the Grand Jury Prize at the 2018 Sundance Film Festival. It had four nominations at the Independent Spirit Awards, including Best Film, winning Best First Screenplay. Fisher received their first Golden Globe nomination for the film, but the film was not nominated for Best Motion Picture – Musical or Comedy despite reporter Kyle Buchanan considering it to be A24's best candidate for the category.

Burnham and Fisher each won Breakthrough awards at the Gotham Awards. Eighth Grade additionally won two National Board of Review Awards, including being named in the Top Ten Films of 2018; the American Film Institute also included it in its annual top 10. The film was nominated for three Satellite Awards, including Best Independent Film, and three Critics' Choice Awards, winning Best Young Performer for Fisher. Additionally, Burnham won the Directors Guild of America Award for Outstanding First-Time Feature and the Writers Guild of America Award for Best Original Screenplay.
