= Klein Memorial Auditorium =

Theater in Bridgeport, Connecticut

Coordinates: 41.1745°N 73.2021°W

- The Klein
- Interactive map of Klein Memorial Auditorium
- Address: 910 Fairfield Avenue
- Location: Bridgeport, Connecticut
- Operator: The Klein Memorial Auditorium Foundation
- Seating type: Theater
- Capacity: 1,400
- Type: Performing Arts Center

Construction
- Opened: 1940

Website
- http://www.theklein.org

The Klein Memorial Auditorium is a 1400-seat proscenium theater located at 910 Fairfield Avenue in Bridgeport, Connecticut, United States. The venue was built with funds willed to the city by Bridgeport native Jacob Klein (1862 – 1932), a lawyer and active supporter of Bridgeport community organizations. The auditorium, designed by local architect Leonard Asheim, was built in the Art Deco style and features bronze doors, a marble lobby, inlaid wood and geometric motifs.

After opening its doors in 1940, the Klein hosted such acts as Leonard Bernstein, Arthur Fiedler, Eleanor Roosevelt, Martin Luther King Jr., Paul Robeson, Milton Berle, Victor Borge and Bill Cosby. More recently The Klein has hosted such diverse musical acts as Alice Cooper, B.B. King, Buddy Guy, Boz Scaggs, Herbie Hancock, Ziggy Marley, George Carlin, Peter Frampton, Boyz II Men, the B-52s, and the Parris Island Marine Band.

In addition to its history as a concert venue, local dance recitals, graduations, and union meetings occur regularly at the Klein, and the theater has been the home of the Greater Bridgeport Symphony Orchestra for the past 60 years. Other companies currently in residence include the New England Ballet Company, Greater Bridgeport Youth Orchestras, ConnectUs, and the Fairfield County Children's Choir.

== List of notable performers and speakers ==
- Pat Benatar
- Leonard Bernstein
- George Carlin
- Bill Cosby
- Jimmy Hoffa
- B. B. King
- Martin Luther King Jr.
- Bob Newhart
- Alice Cooper
- Duke Ellington
- Jose Iturbi
- David Bar-Illan
- Wynton Marsalis and Jazz at Lincoln Center Orchestra
- Donald Trump
