= Congregation Ahavath Achim =

Modern Orthodox synagogue and historic former synagogue in Connecticut, US

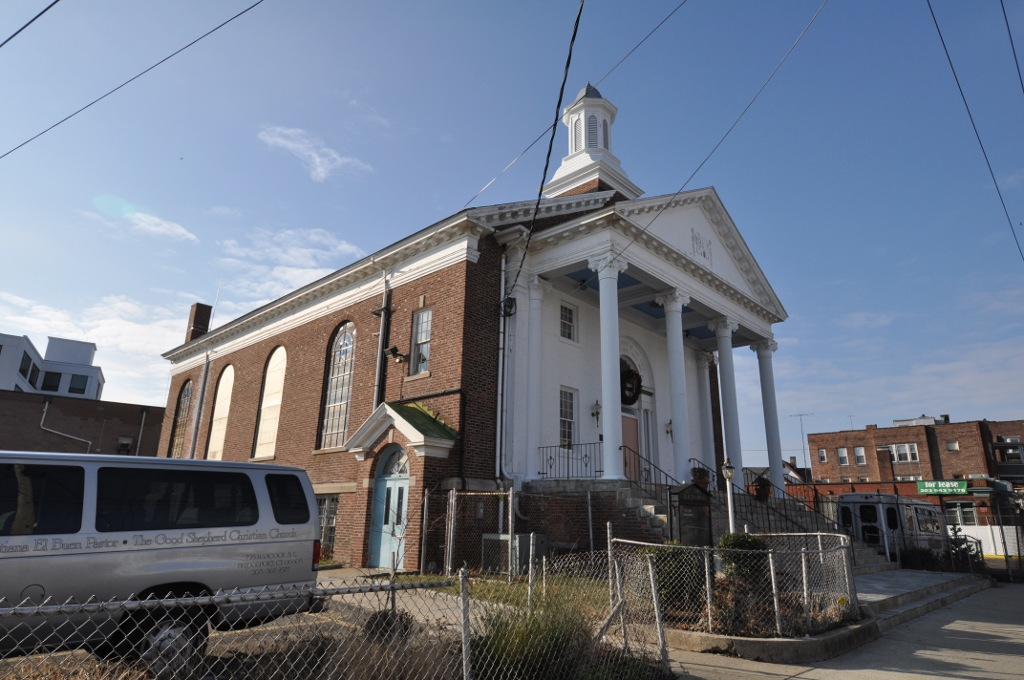

- Location of the current temporary synagogue in Connecticut

Religion
- Affiliation: Modern Orthodox Judaism
- Ecclesiastical or organizational status: Synagogue
- Leadership: Rabbi Peretz Robinson (part-time)
- Status: Active

Location
- Location: Fairfield, Connecticut 06825
- Country: United States
- Interactive map of Congregation Ahavath Achim
- Coordinates: 41°12′02″N 73°14′27″W

Architecture
- Architect: Leonard Asheim (1926)
- Type: Synagogue
- Style: 1926: Colonial Revival; Georgian Revival
- General contractor: E. & F. Construction Company
- Established: 1904 (as a congregation)
- Completed: undated (Cherry Street); 1926 (NHRP-listed Hancock Ave); 1964 (Stratfield Road)

Website
- ahavathachim.org
- West End Congregation— Achavath [sic] Achim Synagogue (former)
- U.S. National Register of Historic Places
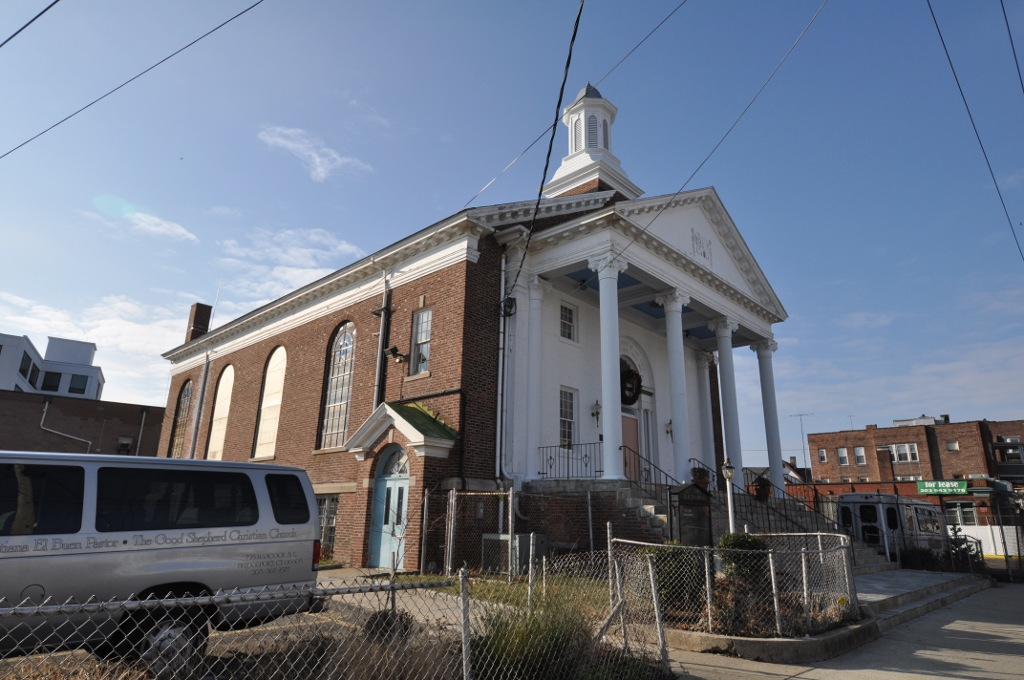
- The former synagogue, now church, in 2013
- Location: 725 Hancock Avenue, Bridgeport, Connecticut
- Coordinates: 41°10′12″N 73°12′44″W
- NRHP reference No.: 95000574
- Added to NRHP: May 11, 1995

Congregation Ahavath Achim (transliterated from Hebrew as "Brotherly Love") is a Modern Orthodox Jewish congregation and synagogue, located in Fairfield, Connecticut, in the United States.

Established as a congregation in 1904, the congregation's first synagogue building, located at 725 Hancock Avenue in Bridgeport, was completed in 1926, vacated in the 1960s, and was subsequently used a Christian church.

This former synagogue was added to the National Register of Historic Places on May 11, 1995, as "West End Congregation--Achavath [sic] Achim Synagogue", as part of a multiple property listing of fifteen historic synagogues in Connecticut.

== History ==
Congregation Ahavath Achim was founded in Bridgeport in 1904, for the sizable Hungarian Jewish community whose members settled primarily in the city's West End. They met in the homes of members until they were able to move to a more permanent location. The congregation was initially located on Cherry Street, that was destroyed by a fire in 1910 and subsequently rebuilt; then, in 1926, it moved to Hancock Avenue in Bridgeport.

As the immigrants prospered in their new homeland, they decided to build a "magnificent structure [using] the most modern techniques, glorious stained-glass windows, a beautiful Aron Ha-Kodesh, a lovely, traditional bimah, Colonial pillars, a breath-taking landscaping development ... a gorgeous edifice that would evoke for a blessed generation the proud statement: 'This is my synagogue!'"

The former synagogue building in Bridgeport was designed by Leonard Asheim, and is a rare example of a Colonial Revival and Georgian Revival house of worship containing details such as a portico with fluted columns and round arch stained-glass windows.

The former Ahavath Achim synagogue building was one of fifteen Connecticut synagogues added to the National Register of Historic Places in 1995 and 1996 in response to an unprecedented multiple submission, nominating nineteen synagogues. As of 2013, this building was functioning as a church, owned and occupied by Iglesia Christiana El Buen Pastor.

The congregation moved to Fairfield with the growth of the Jewish community there in the 1950s. Construction of the Stratfield Road synagogue took place from 1958 to 1963, and the building was dedicated in 1964. In 1985, the congregation merged with Congregation Adath Yeshurun. Renovations and additions to the synagogue building were made in 1995 in order to accommodate the growth of Hillel Academy, the community’s Jewish day school, which closed its doors in 2010 due to a low enrollment. In 2017, the congregation sold its Streatfield Road synagogue to a developer who plans to construct a three-story assisted living center on the redeveloped site.

The congregation began using rented premises from late 2017.

== See also ==
- History of Bridgeport, Connecticut
- National Register of Historic Places listings in Bridgeport, Connecticut
