= Sparks (2026 film) =

American indie drama film

- SXSW premiere poster
- Directed by: Fergus Campbell
- Written by: Fergus Campbell
- Produced by: Lola Lafia
- Starring: Elsie Fisher; Charlie B. Foster
- Cinematography: Keldon Duane-McGlashan
- Edited by: Lygia Brubeck
- Music by: Jane Paknia
- Production company: Build Week Productions
- Distributed by: Strand Releasing
- Release date: March 12, 2026 (SXSW)
- Running time: 76 minutes
- Country: United States
- Language: English

Sparks is a 2026 American drama film written and directed by Fergus Campbell, starring Elsie Fisher and Charlie B. Foster in his feature film debut. The film follows a group of teenagers in Sparks, Nevada, who attempt time travel to escape the mundanity of their small town.

Sparks premiered at South by Southwest on March 12, 2026. The film received mostly positive reviews from critics following its premiere, with praise given to the cinematography, the primarily queer cast of characters, and the performances of Fisher, Foster, and McAuliffe.

It will be released theatrically in North America by Strand Releasing in spring 2027.

== Premise ==
An aimless group of teenage best friends called the Crop kill time in their hometown of Sparks, Nevada, by attempting time travel—chasing a local legend that says a nearby reservoir is a time portal. When newcomer Cleo (Fisher) moves to town, she crosses paths with the Crop and decides to time travel to 1960s Paris and take part in the French New Wave. Her arrival usurps the power of Crop leader Antoine (Foster), who is both attracted to and frustrated by Cleo's spiritedness, and irrevocably alters the Crop's longstanding social dynamics.

== Cast ==
- Elsie Fisher as Cleo
- Charlie B. Foster as Antoine
- Denny McAuliffe as Max
- Madison Hu as Odette
- Simon Downes Toney as Trip
- Thomas Deen Baker as Kane
- Julia D'Angelo as Casazza

== Production ==
Filming for Sparks took in place and around Sparks, Nevada and San Francisco across 23 days in October 2024. It was shot with an ALEXA 35. The score was composed by Jane Paknia.

== Release ==
Sparks premiered at South by Southwest on March 12, 2026. In September 2026, Strand Releasing announced it had acquired North American distribution rights, with a planned theatrical release in spring 2027.

== Reception ==
Sparks was reviewed positively in The Hollywood Reporter, which praised Campbell's direction and the performances of Fisher and Foster. SFGate also praised the film's performances and its depiction of the Bay Area. In a profile of the film, The New York Times noted its whimsical style and "Zoomer queer representation."
