= Elsie Fisher =

American actress (born 2003)

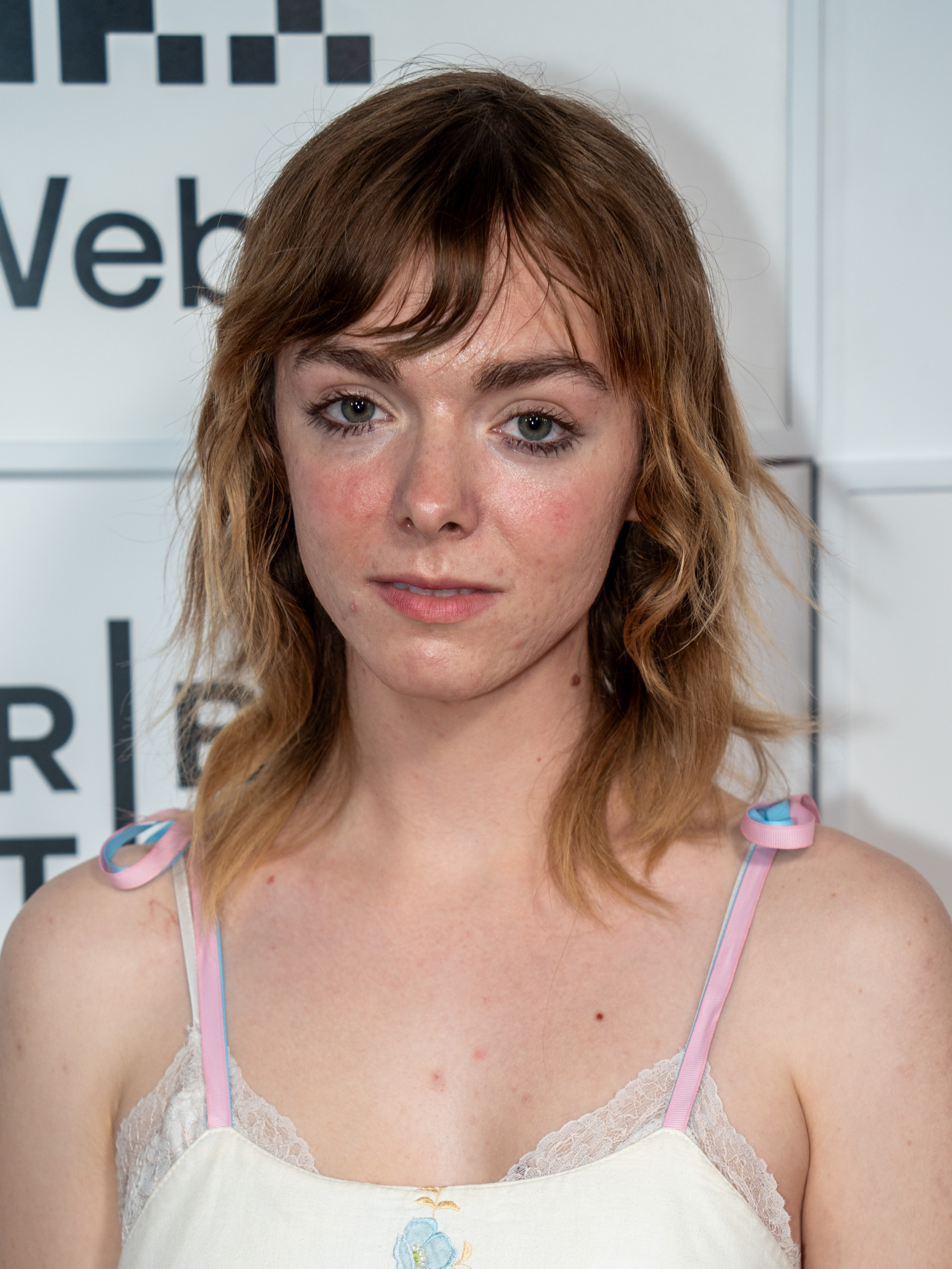
- Fisher at the 2025 Tribeca Film Festival
- Born: April 3, 2003 (age 23); Riverside, California, U.S.
- Occupation: Actress
- Years active: 2009–present

Elsie Fisher (born April 3, 2003) is an American actress. She is known for her starring role in Bo Burnham's comedy-drama film Eighth Grade (2018), for which she earned a nomination for the Golden Globe Award for Best Actress – Motion Picture Comedy or Musical. She also voices animated characters including Agnes in Despicable Me (2010) and Despicable Me 2 (2013), Masha in Masha and the Bear (2009–2012), and Parker Needler in The Addams Family (2019).

== Life and career ==
Fisher was born in Riverside, California on April 3, 2003. She began her career at age six, appearing in a 2009 episode of Medium. a supernatural drama series on NBC. From 2009 to 2012, she voiced Masha for the English dub of the Russian animated children's series Masha and the Bear. Fisher gained further recognition for voicing Agnes in Despicable Me (2010) and its sequel Despicable Me 2 (2013). She did not participate in later films in the series. Fisher appeared in a supporting role in the sports drama film McFarland, USA, which was released in February 2015. By March 2016, Fisher had appeared in over 16 national commercials.

In 2018, Fisher received critical acclaim for her performance as socially-struggling teenage girl Kayla Day in Eighth Grade, the directorial debut of comedian Bo Burnham. For her performance, Fisher earned numerous accolades including a Golden Globe Award nomination for Best Actress – Motion Picture Comedy or Musical. After filming Eighth Grade, she began high school and was not cast in her high school play to Burnham's disgust. She went on to voice Parker Needler in The Addams Family in 2019. Also in 2019, she appeared in the main role of Joy Wilkes, daughter of Annie Wilkes, in the second season of the Hulu anthology horror series Castle Rock. In 2022, Fisher joined the cast of HBO dark comedy series Barry in its third season.

== Filmography ==
=== Film ===
Year	Title	Role	Notes	Ref.
2010	Despicable Me	Agnes (voice)		
2010	Dirty Girl	Tiffany Briggs		
2010	Home Makeover	Agnes (voice)	Short film	
2012	Peter at the End	Elsie	Short film	
2013	Despicable Me 2	Agnes (voice)		
2013	My Friend Robot	Charlie	Short film	
2013	Bad Behavior	Grace		
2013	Vertical	Ashley Stewart		
2013	Travelers	Libby	Short film	
2013	Training Wheels	Agnes (voice)	Short film	
2014	Gutshot Straight	Stephanie		
2015	McFarland, USA	Jamie White		
2016	The Axe Murders of Villisca	Ina		
2017	Scales: A Mermaids Tale	Hayden		
2018	Eighth Grade	Kayla Day		
2019	The Addams Family	Parker Needler (voice)		
2022	Texas Chainsaw Massacre	Lila		
2022	Family Squares	Cassie Worth	Also AA & CC Camera Operator	
2022	My Best Friend's Exorcism	Abby Rivers		
2023	Memory	Sara		
2024	Christmas Eve in Miller's Point	Lynn		
2024	Boys Go to Jupiter	Beatbox (voice)		
2025	Tow	Avery Ogle		
2026	Sparks	Cleo		
2026	Roommates	Mara		

=== Television ===
Year	Title	Role	Notes	Ref.
2009	Medium	Young Bridgette DuBois	Episode: "Then and Again"	
2011	Mike & Molly	Fairy Princess	Episode: "Happy Halloween"	
2012	Masha and the Bear	Masha (voice)	26 episodes	
2013	Raising Hope	Susie	2 episodes	
2013	Sofia the First	Woodsman's Daughter (voice)	Episode: "Holiday in Enchancia"	
2019	Castle Rock	Joy Wilkes	10 episodes	
2022–23	Barry	Katie Harris	Recurring (Season 3–4)	
2023	The Summer I Turned Pretty	Skye	Series regular (Season 2)	
2026	The Bear	Terry 'Cheese' Cheddario	Recurring (Season 5)	

=== Web ===
Year	Title	Role	Notes	Ref.
2020	Day by Day	Ruby (voice)	Podcast series, episode: "Relocation"	

== Awards and nominations ==
Year	Award	Category	Work	Result	Ref
2018	Chicago Film Critics Association	Most Promising Performer	Eighth Grade	Won	
2018	Detroit Film Critics Society	Best Actress	Eighth Grade	Nominated	
2018	Detroit Film Critics Society	Best Breakthrough Performance	Eighth Grade	Nominated	
2018	Florida Film Critics Circle	Pauline Kael Breakout Award	Eighth Grade	Won	
2018	Gotham Independent Film Award	Breakthrough Actor	Eighth Grade	Won	
2018	Indiana Film Journalists Association	Best Actress	Eighth Grade	Nominated	
2018	Indiana Film Journalists Association	Breakout of the Year	Eighth Grade	Nominated	
2018	Las Vegas Film Critics Society	Youth in Film – Female	Eighth Grade	Won	
2018	Los Angeles Online Film Critics Society	Best Actress 23 and Under	Eighth Grade	Won	
2018	Los Angeles Online Film Critics Society	Best Breakthrough Performance	Eighth Grade	Nominated	
2018	New York Film Critics Online	Breakthrough Performer	Eighth Grade	Won	
2018	Phoenix Film Critics Society	Best Performance by a Youth	Eighth Grade	Won	
2018	Phoenix Film Critics Society	Breakthrough Performance	Eighth Grade	Won	
2018	San Diego Film Critics Society	Best Actress	Eighth Grade	Nominated	
2018	San Diego Film Critics Society	Breakthrough Artist	Eighth Grade	Nominated	
2018	Seattle Film Critics Society	Best Youth Performance	Eighth Grade	Won	
2018	Seattle International Film Festival	Best Actress	Eighth Grade	Won	
2018	Utah Film Critics Association	Best Actress	Eighth Grade	Won	
2018	Washington D.C. Area Film Critics Association	Best Youth Performance	Eighth Grade	Won	
2018	Women Film Critics Circle	Best Young Actress	Eighth Grade	Won	
2019	Alliance of Women Film Journalists	Best Breakthrough Performance	Eighth Grade	Nominated	
2019	Austin Film Critics Association	Best Actress	Eighth Grade	Nominated	
2019	Austin Film Critics Association	Breakthrough Artist Award	Eighth Grade	Nominated	
2019	Critics' Choice Movie Awards	Best Young Actor/Actress	Eighth Grade	Won	
2019	Critics' Choice Movie Awards	Best Actress in a Comedy	Eighth Grade	Nominated	
2019	Dorian Awards	Rising Star of the Year	Eighth Grade	Nominated	
2019	Georgia Film Critics Association	Best Actress	Eighth Grade	Nominated	
2019	Georgia Film Critics Association	Breakthrough Award	Eighth Grade	Won	
2019	Golden Globe Awards	Best Actress – Comedy or Musical	Eighth Grade	Nominated	
2019	Independent Spirit Awards	Best Female Lead	Eighth Grade	Nominated	
2019	Online Film and Television Association	Best Youth Performance	Eighth Grade	Won	
2019	Online Film and Television Association	Breakthrough Performance: Female	Eighth Grade	Won	
2019	Satellite Awards	Best Actress – Musical or Comedy	Eighth Grade	Nominated	
