= Greater Connecticut Youth Orchestras =

Youth orchestras in Connecticut, U.S.

The Greater Connecticut Youth Orchestras (GCTYO) is based in Fairfield, Connecticut, United States.

It serves more than 350 students from over thirty surrounding towns, including Fairfield, Bridgeport, Trumbull, Monroe, Easton, Westport, Orange, and Southbury.

== History and operations ==
At the start of their new season in 2019, the organization changed its name to Greater Connecticut Youth Orchestras from the original Greater Bridgeport Youth Orchestras to broaden its reach beyond the Greater Bridgeport area and to reflect its current membership from all over Connecticut.

The orchestras perform at least three times a year in Bridgeport at the Klein Memorial Auditorium. It was led for over twenty-five years by Robert Genualdi.

The current music director and principal orchestra conductor is Christopher Hisey, an alumnus of the program. He has been involved with the organization for over thirty years.

GCTYO consists of ten orchestras:

1. Principal Orchestra – Christopher Hisey, conductor
2. Philharmonic Orchestra – Polina Nazaykinskaya, conductor
3. Virtuosi Orchestra – Britney Alcine, conductor
4. Symphonia – Gjorgj Kroqi, conductor
5. String Orchestra – Bruce Sloat, conductor
6. Wind Orchestra – Brian Miller, conductor
7. Percussion Orchestra – Jim Royle Drum Studio (Brian Ente, conductor)
8. Jazz Orchestra I – Dr. Rex Cadwallader, Director
9. Jazz Orchestra II – Geoffrey Brookes, conductor
10. Chamber Orchestra – Christopher Hisey, conductor

== Performances ==
2013

In 2013, the Principal Orchestra of the Greater Bridgeport Youth Orchestras played a Christmas-themed benefit concert at Carnegie Hall with singer Jackie Evancho and flautist James Galway, that was produced by composer Tim Janis.

2014

In 2014, the GCTYO traveled to China to play four concerts in Xian, Shanghai, Beijing, and Hangzhou over a period of twelve days.

2015

In 2015, the GCTYO had its first annual Lawn Concert on the Great Lawn of the Pequot Library in Southport, Connecticut.

2016

In 2016, the GCTYO traveled to Italy and performed in Rome and Florence.

2018

In 2018, the GCTYO toured Scotland and Iceland and performed at Harpa, a concert hall in Reykjavik, Iceland.

2019

In 2019, the Greater Bridgeport Youth Orchestras became Greater Connecticut Youth Orchestras to better reflect its members who come from all over Connecticut to rehearse each week.

== See also ==
- List of youth orchestras in the United States
- Music of Connecticut
