= Leonard Asheim =

American architect (1877–1961)

- Born: 1877; Germany
- Died: 1961 (aged 83–84); Fairfield, Connecticut, U.S.
- Occupation: Architect
- Buildings: Achavath Achim Synagogue, Klein Memorial Auditorium

Leonard Asheim (1877–1961) was a German-American Jewish architect from Connecticut. He was especially noted as an architect of schools.

Born in Germany, Asheim later came to the United States, locating in Waterbury, Connecticut. He worked for Joseph A. Jackson for three years, before going to Boston, where he took evening classes in architecture at the Massachusetts Institute of Technology, while working days for architects in that city. Asheim first opened his office in Waterbury in 1898. He quickly began to specialize in school buildings, a part of his practice that continued after his move to Bridgeport in 1909.

In 1945 he went to New Haven, leaving his office in the care of loyal assistant Oliver Wilkins. At this time, Asheim moved to a consulting position. In the 1950s he also went to Florida, but soon returned to Bridgeport. At his death in 1961, he was the oldest architect in the city.

== Architectural work ==
West End Branch Library, Bridgeport, 1922.

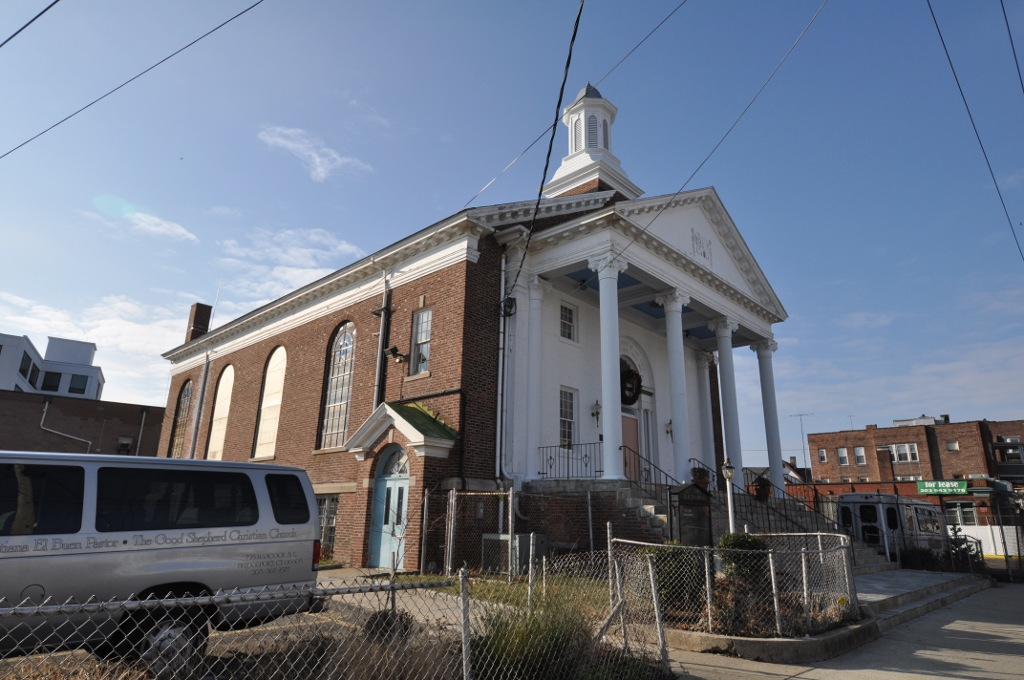
Achavath Achim Synagogue, Bridgeport, 1926.

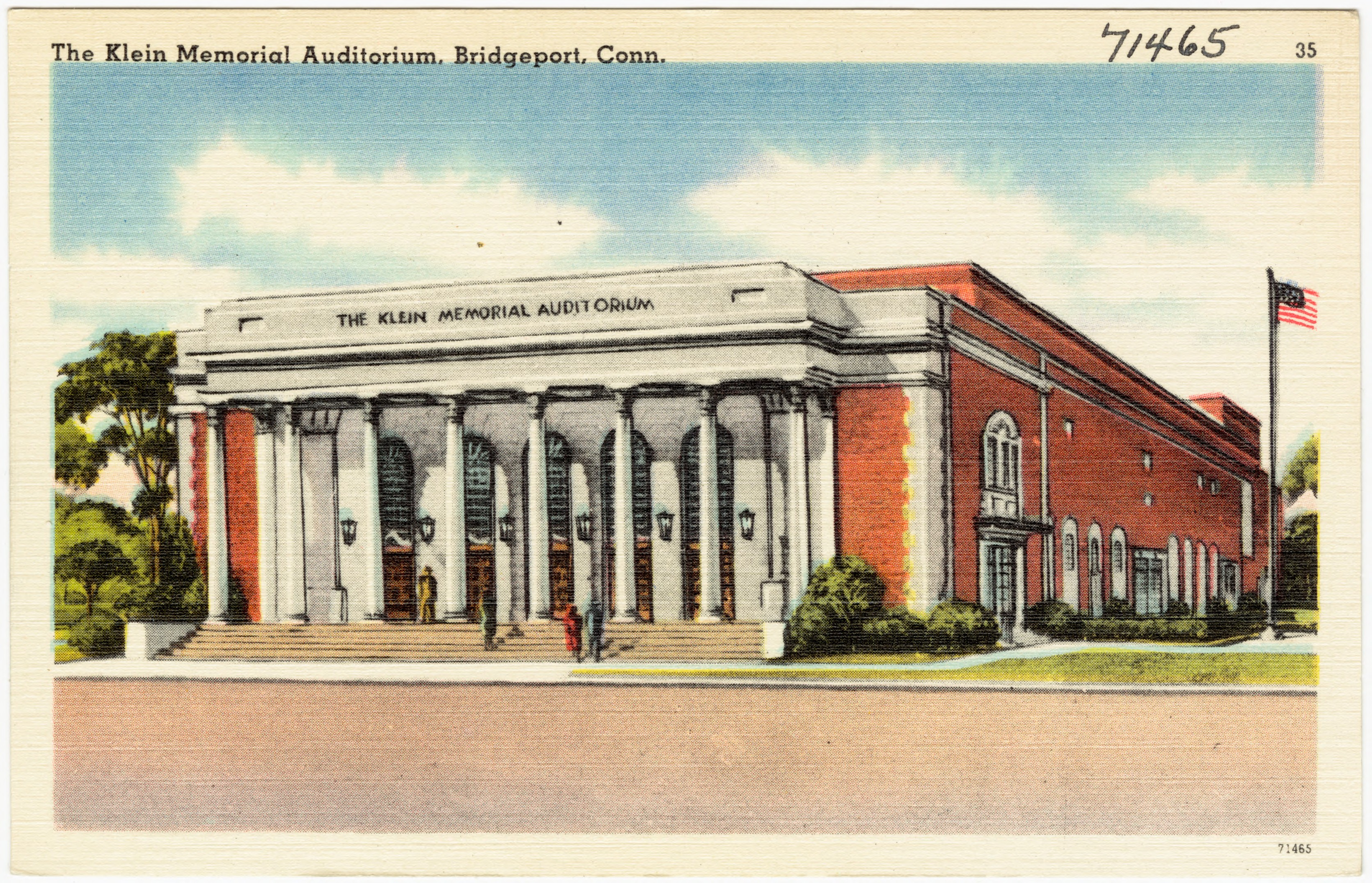
Klein Memorial Auditorium, Bridgeport, 1938.

- 1902 - Mulcahy School, Fairmount & Lounsbury Sts, Waterbury, Connecticut
  - Demolished
- 1909 - Davis School, 26 Davis St, Oakville, Connecticut
  - Demolished in 2012
- 1910 - Leonard Asheim House, 2345 North Ave, Bridgeport, Connecticut
- 1910 - Sheridan School, 280 Tesiny Ave, Bridgeport, Connecticut
- 1911 - Park Avenue Temple, 1100 Park Ave, Bridgeport, Connecticut
- 1912 - Whittier School, 86 Whittier St, Bridgeport, Connecticut
- 1916 - Mrs. Bernard Blumberg House, 56 Lyon Ter, Bridgeport, Connecticut
- 1916 - Maplewood Junior High School, 240 Linwood Ave, Bridgeport, Connecticut
- 1917 - Fairfield Avenue Fire/Police Station, 2676 Fairfield Ave, Bridgeport, Connecticut
- 1917 - Welfare Building, Washington & Madison Aves, Bridgeport, Connecticut
  - Demolished in the 1990s
- 1919 - West Side Bank Building, 1460 State St, Bridgeport, Connecticut
- 1921 - Temple Israel, 100 Willow St, Waterbury, Connecticut
  - Demolished
- 1922 - Newfield Branch Library, 755 Central Ave, Bridgeport, Connecticut
- 1922 - West End Branch Library, 1705 Fairfield Ave, Bridgeport, Connecticut
- 1926 - Achavath Achim Synagogue, 725 Hancock Ave, Bridgeport, Connecticut
- 1928 - Central Fire Station, 72 New Haven Ave, Milford, Connecticut
- 1932 - Ferdinand Frassinelli House, 33 Eames Blvd, Bridgeport, Connecticut
- 1936 - Milford Courthouse, 14 W River St, Milford, Connecticut
- 1938 - Klein Memorial Auditorium, 910 Fairfield Ave, Bridgeport, Connecticut
- 1939 - Orcutt Boys' Club, 102 Park St, Bridgeport, Connecticut
