= Weeds season 5 =

Weeds
- Season 5
- DVD cover
- No. of episodes: 13

Release
- Original network: Showtime
- Original release: June 8 – August 31, 2009

Season chronology
- ← Previous; Season 4 Next → Season 6

The fifth season of Weeds premiered on June 8, 2009, on the television cable network Showtime, and consisted of 13 episodes, attracted 1.2 million viewers, with a rerun on the same night adding another 500,000 viewers for a cumulative 1.7 million. The season finale episode premiered on Monday, August 31, 2009, averaging 1.3 million viewers, up versus season 4's finale that averaged 1 million.

== Plot ==
Esteban spares Nancy after learning of her pregnancy. He has bodyguards assigned to her, and he forces Nancy to undergo a test to confirm the baby is his. Anxious for Shane's safety, Nancy initially has Andy send Shane to her sister, Jill Price-Grey (Jennifer Jason Leigh). However, Jill returns with Shane and Andy after Shane discovers her and Andy having sex. Silas draws up a new plan to start a legal medical marijuana business with Doug, which Nancy funds. When Nancy's initial bodyguard goes missing, Ignacio serves as her new bodyguard; Shane witnesses violence at the hands of Ignacio, who helps Shane and Isabelle steal from a teacher who stole Shane's pot.

Quinn's attempt to extort money for Celia's return to her friends and family fails miserably, since none of them are willing to pay any ransom. Returning to Ren Mar, Celia ends up squatting in Nancy's garage. Meanwhile, Andy wants Nancy to have an abortion and flee with him, suggesting that she will never be free if she has a baby with Esteban. However, Nancy ultimately decides for her and Shane to move in with Esteban.

Six months later, Esteban proposes to Nancy and she accepts, but Pilar (Kate del Castillo), a powerful woman in Mexican politics, forces Esteban to break off the engagement. Cesar arranges a birthing room in the house, so there will be no record of the baby's birth. With Andy's aid, Nancy escapes Esteban's house and appeals to her obstetrician, Dr. Audra Kitson (Alanis Morissette), who delivers the baby at the hospital; Andy later begins a relationship with Audra. To protect his political career, Esteban does not sign the birth certificate, while Nancy moves back in with Andy, who agrees to sign the certificate. He also convinces Nancy to give the baby a Bris, to Esteban's dismay.

Esteban, wanting to see his son, again asks Nancy to marry him. Simultaneously, an assassin trying to shoot Nancy misses and hits Shane in the left shoulder. When confronted by Nancy, Cesar admits to being an informant for Pilar, who ordered the hit; however, the execution was not completed because Cesar could not bring himself to perform it. Nancy keeps the betrayal from Esteban in exchange for getting to shoot Cesar in the arm. Esteban finds himself replaced as a candidate for governor, but with encouragement from Nancy, he runs as an independent.

Silas' medical marijuana shop is raided by the police, and he and Doug lose all of their pot in the process; they turn to Dean to help reclaim it. Meanwhile, Celia gets a job as a home sales representative for a cosmetics company, but unable to sell the makeup, Celia manipulates Dean into giving her the pot and begins selling it packaged with the cosmetics. Celia's story arc concludes with her forming her own team consisting of Doug, Dean, Sanjay, Ignacio, and Isabelle to sell marijuana—a deliberate echo of Nancy in season one.

The Botwin family moves into Esteban's house, and Nancy and Esteban get married. Nancy visits Guillermo in prison; she arranges for the assassination of Pilar, in exchange for Guillermo's extradition to Mexico. Esteban becomes the front-runner for governor despite Pilar's rejection, but he is arrested for suspicion of conspiracy, racketeering and tax evasion. Upon his release, Esteban again runs for governor on Pilar's platform; Pilar has arranged for his arrest, and is blackmailing him into becoming her political puppet. Pilar confronts Nancy and informs her that she and Esteban must do everything she dictates.

During a fundraising party, Pilar corners Nancy by a pool on the outside deck. Pilar reveals to Nancy that she is aware of her actions involving Guillermo, and suggests that the apparent accidental deaths of Shane and Silas would generate a sympathy vote for Esteban. Nancy threatens to kill Pilar if she endangers her children. At that moment, Pilar is whacked in the head by an unseen third party and ends up floating face down in the pool, bleeding profusely from the head. Shane appears next to Nancy, holding a croquet mallet.

== Cast ==
=== Main cast ===
- Mary-Louise Parker as Nancy Botwin (13 episodes)
- Elizabeth Perkins as Celia Hodes (13 episodes)
- Hunter Parrish as Silas Botwin (13 episodes)
- Alexander Gould as Shane Botwin (13 episodes)
- Allie Grant as Isabelle Hodes (7 episodes)
- Justin Kirk as Andy Botwin (13 episodes)
- Kevin Nealon as Doug Wilson (13 episodes)

=== Special guest stars ===
- Jennifer Jason Leigh as Jill Price-Grey
- Demián Bichir as Esteban Reyes
- Guillermo Díaz as Guillermo García Gómez
- Alanis Morissette as Dr. Audra Kitson

=== Departures ===
This is the last season Elizabeth Perkins and Allie Grant appear in, as Celia and Isabelle Hodes respectively. Celia's whereabouts are left unknown. It is revealed in season eight that Isabelle has undergone a gender transition and is now named Bruce Hodes.

=== Recurring cast ===
- Renée Victor as Lupita
- Hannah Marks as Harmony
- Jillian Rose Reed as Simone
- Maulik Pancholy as Sanjay Patel
- Andy Milder as Dean Hodes
- Haley Hudson as Quinn Hodes
- Larry Joe Campbell as C.P. Jones
- Amanda Pace as Taylor Grey
- Rachel Pace as Shayla Grey
- Hemky Madera as Ignacio Morero Jr.
- Kate del Castillo as Pilar Zuazo
- Jack Stehlin as Captain Roy Till
- Mel Fair as Scott Price-Grey
- Ramón Franco as Sucio
- Kevin Alejandro as Rudolpho
- Jamie Denbo as Raylene
- Matt Peters as Gayle
- Todd Robert Anderson as Mr. Sundasky
- Seychelle Gabriel as Adelita
- Stephanie Erb as Margaret
- Jonathan Blitt as Blitt
- Carlos Gomez as Dr. Brisas
- Helen Sun as Boba Employee
- Olivia Summers as Orange Julia

== Episodes ==
No. overall	No. in season	Title	Directed by	Written by	Intertitle	Original release date
51	1	"Wonderful Wonderful"	Scott Ellis	Jenji Kohan	Gynecological exam	June 8, 2009
Nancy is saved from execution because of her pregnancy. However, Esteban demands a test to determine if the child is "both male and mine." Andy confesses his love for Nancy and suggests that the family flee to Copenhagen. When Nancy tells Andy that she is carrying Esteban's baby, he enters a depressive stupor. Under Nancy's orders, Andy sets out to Oakland to leave Shane with Jill Price-Grey, Nancy's estranged sister. Doug and Silas visit the forest to plant MILF weed clones. In Mexico, Rodolfo calls Celia's "friends" for ransom money, but no one is willing to pay. When he realizes that Celia's organs cannot be harvested, Rodolfo dumps Quinn and kicks her out of his tent. Cesar begins following Nancy.
52	2	"Machetes Up Top"	Michael Pressman	Victoria Morrow	Sushi meal	June 15, 2009
Nancy escapes Cesar's grasp and has a hostile visit with Guillermo at the prison. Guillermo tells Nancy that Esteban is likely to kill her. Nancy visits Dean to get her affairs in order, and then has a sushi and whiskey. Later, she visits Esteban and begs him either to kill her or fully pardon her. In response, he rapes her, stating that she doesn't dictate the terms of the relationship. In Oakland, Jill and Andy get drunk and have sex; Shane records the affair with a camera. Doug and Silas are ripped off by a criminal operation in the forest. After learning that she isn't loved or missed, Celia pleads to Rodolfo to allow her to stay in his camp. Rodolfo studies Celia's behavior and realizes why Quinn is the way she is.
53	3	"Su-Su-Sucio"	Lesli Linka Glatter	Roberto Benabib & Matthew Salsberg	Soap bar	June 22, 2009
Sucio replaces Cesar as Nancy's bodyguard. Nancy has menstrual bleeding that prompts a visit to the Mexican OBGYN; he tells Nancy to reduce her stress level. Silas asks Nancy for help to open a compassionate-care marijuana club with Doug; she agrees. Deputy police Chief Jones grants Silas and Doug permission to open the store, but he extorts them for money. Jill drags Shane and Andy back to Ren Mar. During Jill's brief stay, Nancy and Jill continue to spar; Jill reveals to the family that Nancy had an affair with her math teacher. Rodolfo ships Celia to Texas. Sucio disappears while taking a shower. Captain Roy Till begins spying on Nancy.
54	4	"Super Lucky Happy"	Scott Ellis	Ron Fitzgerald	Pinball machine	June 29, 2009
Esteban meets Nancy's family. After it is confirmed that Nancy carries his son, Esteban invites the Botwins to move in with him. Ignacio becomes Nancy's bodyguard and captures Captain Till, who has sworn to kill those who killed Agent Schlatter. Nancy incapacitates Ignacio and holds both of them hostage. Realizing this situation must end with one of them dying, Nancy reluctantly turns Till into Esteban, who has Till murdered. Celia asks for Nancy's permission to move into the Ren Mar house; Nancy rebuffs her. Andy finds Judah's passbook for a bank account worth $186,000. Unfortunately, the female bank teller, Margaret, was heartbroken by Judah years ago. In exchange for granting Andy access to the account, Margaret gets Andy to take him on a date as Judah. Doug and Silas find rental space for their store. Shane's teacher steals a large quantity of pot from him.
55	5	"Van Nuys"	Bethany Rooney	Stephen Falk	Cockatoo	July 6, 2009
Nancy visits Dr. Audra's clinic. Ignacio helps Shane and Isabelle reclaim the pot from their teacher, though Shane also steals other items and kills his teacher's cockatoo as a penalty. Nancy forces Shane to make restitution. Silas and Doug find a supplier for their pot store. Celia, who is squatting in Nancy's garage, discovers Sucio's body and blackmails Nancy into letting her stay longer. Andy has a creepy date with Margaret that ends with sex, and he is able to acquire the $180,000. Andy pushes Nancy to have an abortion and flee to Copenhagen. Nancy writes Andy a letter that states she and Shane have moved in with Esteban.
56	6	"A Modest Proposal"	Michael Trim	Vanessa Reisen	Swimsuit with fake tan	July 13, 2009
Six months later, Esteban proposes marriage to Nancy, who accepts. Esteban has informed many people in their sphere of his intentions. However, he leaves Nancy the task of talking to Andy. In his depression, Andy has spent almost all of the $180,000 he acquired. Andy eventually blesses the impending marriage, but warns Nancy that he will not be there for her if Esteban dies. Just after Andy leaves, a vividly angry woman arrives and argues with Esteban; he promptly calls off the wedding. Chief Jones has been visiting the pot store in his police uniform and consequently reducing sales. Doug recklessly confronts and injures Jones. Ignacio attacks someone with a golf club in front of Shane.
57	7	"Where the Sidewalk Ends"	Jeremy Podeswa	Roberto Benabib & Matthew Salsberg	Weeds entry on Wikipedia	July 20, 2009
Pilar Zuazo, a politically powerful woman who curries favor with important Mexican leaders on Esteban's behalf, objects to Esteban marrying an American white woman, which could undermine Esteban's political position prior to his run for governor. Shane is still disturbed by Ignacio's violence, and he fears that Nancy and he will be killed after the baby is born. Nancy learns that her child will be delivered off-the-grid; she manipulates Andy into taking her to see Audra to give birth. Celia signs on with "You're Pretty," a direct-marketing make-up company. Unfortunately, she has difficulty selling their product. Chief Jones threatens to arrest Doug and Silas for their earlier confrontation. Doug's immature behavior leads Silas to threaten dissolution of their partnership. Later, Internal Affairs raid the marijuana shop and arrest Chief Jones. Nancy gives birth to her son.
58	8	"A Distinctive Horn"	Scott Ellis	Chris Offutt	Medical file drawer	July 27, 2009
Pilar visits Nancy at the hospital and threatens her. After Esteban refuses to sign the baby's birth certificate, Nancy writes in Andy's name. Nancy seeks Andy's help in raising the child; however, still upset over her rejection months earlier, Andy rebuffs her. He changes his mind after a disastrous date with Audra, who insults his immaturity and lack of accomplishment. Nancy re-hires Lupita as a nanny. Andy and Nancy hold a bris for the baby, where he is named Steven Ray Botwin. Esteban crashes the party and quarrels with Nancy. Dean agrees to help Doug and Silas reclaim their pot from the police. Celia manipulates Dean into giving her their pot that she can use to sell to her customers.
59	9	"Suck 'n' Spit"	Michael Trim	Brendan Kelly	Lactating woman	August 3, 2009
Andy and Nancy adjust to raising a baby. Harmony and Simone visit Shane and reveal they may have chlamydia; Nancy takes Shane to the doctor for a STD check. Celia starts selling pot, adding the marijuana stolen from Doug and Silas as "incentive" to purchase with the "You're Pretty" cosmetics. After seeing Celia's success, Doug also starts selling "You're Pretty" make-up, hoping for some profits of his own. After going on a blind date arranged by Pilar, Esteban goes to Nancy and begs for a second chance to marry her. Before she can respond, an assassin shoots at Nancy and strikes Shane in the left arm.
60	10	"Perro Insano"	Scott Ellis	David Holstein	Wrestling masks	August 10, 2009
Audra tends to Shane's bullet wound. Nancy deduces that Cesar set her up to be shot by Pilar's assassin; she shoots Cesar in the arm in retribution. Silas moves into Esteban's house. As a wedding gift, Andy signs forms to legally alter Stevie's birth certificate to make Esteban the father. Esteban and Nancy marry. Nancy asks Guillermo to kill Pilar. Celia strikes a deal with Ignacio to obtain pot wholesale, and she then squeezes Dean out of her operation. After Doug realizes that Celia took his pot, he makes a deal with Dean to seek revenge.
61	11	"Ducks and Tigers"	Matt Shakman	Stephen Falk	Anatomical drawing of the vulva	August 17, 2009
The Reyes family settles into their new life. Adelita, Esteban's oldest daughter, arrives from Paris. Nancy manipulates Cesar to arrange for Guillermo's transfer to a Mexican prison so Guillermo can escape. Esteban makes a new run for governor against Pilar's man. However, Pilar has him arrested. Isabelle joins her father and Doug to plot revenge against Celia. Raylene, impressed with Celia's sales record, makes a sexual advance on Celia. Andy and Audra have a second date that is interrupted by an impromptu abortion protest held by Gayle. Andy invites Audra to live at his house, and she accepts.
62	12	"Glue"	Michael Pressman	Ron Fitzgerald	Four objects (keys, coins, Ren Mar police badge and a gum)	August 24, 2009
Nancy travels to the police station in Mexico. Andy wants to propose to Audra and asks Nancy to give him Bubbie's ring—the engagement ring Judah gave to Nancy years ago—so he can give it to Audra. Nancy asserts that Andy is acting on infatuation instead of love. Disguised as an African-American police officer, Dean follows Celia and scares her out of the drug trade. At Esteban's house, Adelita throws a party, takes heroin, and is nearly taken advantage of sexually; Shane intervenes to save her. Nancy returns to Esteban's house and sees him on television with Pilar; they have reconciled, and she is supporting his candidacy again.
63	13	"All About My Mom"	Scott Ellis	Jenji Kohan	Woman jumping into pool	August 31, 2009
Guillermo has escaped from prison. Doug tells Celia that Nancy put together a pot sales team in Agrestic. Still in full envy of Nancy, Celia decides to put together a team consisting of Isabelle, Dean, Doug, Ignacio and Sanjay. Esteban is upset to discover that Adelita is a heroin addict; Nancy arranges for Adelita to enter therapy. Andy proposes to Audra, and she accepts. Upon returning to the Ren Mar house, Gayle confronts the two with a crossbow; Andy flees. After looking at polling data, Pilar decides that Esteban's marriage to Nancy will not harm his campaign for governor. At a fundraising party, Pilar confronts Nancy by the pool. She tells Nancy that Guillermo isn’t coming to her rescue, that he’s on her payroll instead of Esteban’s, and that he is still angry about her ratting him out. Pilar also says she won’t kill Nancy or Stevie, but will set her sights on Silas and Shane to intimidate her. Shane suddenly appears and kills Pilar with a blow to the head using a croquet mallet.

== See also ==
- The General Lee
- Ms. Pac-Man
- Politicians killed in the Mexican drug war
