= Weeds season 7 =

Weeds
- Season 7
- DVD cover
- No. of episodes: 13

Release
- Original network: Showtime
- Original release: June 27 – September 26, 2011

Season chronology
- ← Previous; Season 6 Next → Season 8

The seventh season of Weeds premiered on June 27, 2011, on the television cable network Showtime and consisted of 13 episodes. As the season picks up, Nancy has spent three years in prison and now lives in a strictly monitored halfway house in New York City, where the family meet after they have spent three years in Denmark.

== Plot ==
Three years after Nancy's arrest, Nancy is released from jail and is transferred to a New York City halfway house; Esteban had died in prison; the Botwins are residing in Copenhagen, and they return to New York City to visit Nancy. Jill, who has been raising Stevie to believe Nancy is his aunt, wants custody of Stevie. With the help of Jill's husband, Nancy reunites with Stevie at a planetarium, but he seems to have only a mild attachment to her. Doug reunites with an old college friend, who gets him hired at a venture capital firm. Shane begins taking criminal justice classes and befriends a NYPD detective, Det. Mitch Ouellette.

In California, Nancy attempts to obtain pot from Heylia, who is cultivating a massive field of Conrad's MILF weed; Dean has moved in with Heylia to assist her with legal advice. Heylia provides Nancy with MILF weed, in exchange for Silas' labor to harvest the current crop. Andy pitches an idea for a motorized bike; Shane provides Andy with financial backing to open the business and use it as a cover for Nancy's operation. Nancy, meanwhile, begins an affair with Demetri, the pot-dealing brother of Zoya, her cellmate in prison. Zoya is released from jail and discovers the affair.

Meanwhile, the SEC begins an investigation on Doug's firm for hiding funds. In exchange for an early release from the halfway house, Nancy becomes an informant for the SEC. Wearing a wire, she goes on a "date" with Chuck, the company's CEO; Zoya interrupts and spills information about Nancy's drug business, spurring Nancy to muffle her mic. Wanting to get rid of Zoya, Nancy informs Chuck about her wire, and he flees; Nancy then sets fire to his home in an attempt to frame Zoya for arson. Fearing new criminal charges, Zoya flees to Vermont. The SEC agents threaten to throw Nancy back in jail, but Doug blackmails them into letting Nancy go. With Zoya out of the picture, Nancy begins her drug business, using Doug's corporate position to give herself leverage against their main competition, Pouncy House Party Rentals.

Shane gives Nancy a police report on Pouncy House, but distracted, she leaves the file on the counter. Meanwhile, Silas sleeps with Emma, the manager of Pouncy House, without knowing about her real activities. Emma steals valuable information from him and later raids Andy’s office.

Silas and Emma eventually agree to a merger, but Nancy informs Ouellette about Emma’s involvement with Pouncy House, leading him to organize a police raid. When Ouellette realizes that Nancy only exposed Pouncy House to eliminate competition, he becomes furious that the Botwins had effectively been using the NYPD as muscle for their drug operation. After the raid, Silas angrily ends his partnership with Nancy and tries to negotiate with Demetri to start his own business.

After learning that Nancy and Silas are now on opposing sides, Demetri, who is secretly trying to undermine Silas, convinces his gang to intercept Silas’s next MILF shipment. During the robbery, Heylia and Dean are held at gunpoint by Demetri’s men. Nancy later orders Demetri to return the shipment. Enraged, Silas decides to retaliate by telling Jill about Nancy’s drug business so she can use the information against her in court. As Jill arrives in New York, Nancy receives a call from the judge and learns that she will most likely receive custody of Stevie.

Jill threatens to report Nancy if she doesn't sign over custody of Stevie; Nancy refuses. When Demetri is arrested in an unrelated crime, Nancy collects the stolen shipment from Demetri's apartment. After a conversation with Andy, Silas regrets calling Jill, as he had taken the rivalry between him and Nancy too far. Jill is still insistent that Nancy sign over custody, but Andy resolves the issue by getting everyone to agree to live together in Connecticut. Several months later, the new "Botwin, Price-Gray" estate is launched. Shane is training to be a police officer with the NYPD, but he keeps this a secret from Nancy. During an outdoor family dinner, Nancy is shot in the head by an unknown person.

== Cast ==
=== Main cast ===
- Mary-Louise Parker as Nancy Botwin
- Hunter Parrish as Silas Botwin
- Alexander Gould as Shane Botwin
- Justin Kirk as Andy Botwin
- Kevin Nealon as Doug Wilson

=== Special guest stars ===
- Jennifer Jason Leigh as Jill Price-Grey (5 episodes)
- Tonye Patano as Heylia James (4 episodes)
- Martin Short as Steward Havens (3 episodes)
- Aidan Quinn as Foster "Chuck" Klein (4 episodes)
- Pablo Schreiber as Demetri Ravitch (7 episodes)
- Michelle Trachtenberg as Emma Karlin (5 episodes)

=== Former cast members ===
Tonye Patano and Andy Milder return as recurring characters, as Heylia James and Dean Hodes respectively.

=== Recurring cast ===
- Olga Sosnovska as Zoya Ravitch
- Andy Milder as Dean Hodes
- Bruce Nozick as Whit Tillerman
- Kat Foster as Kiku
- Lindsay Sloane as Maxeen
- David Clennon as Charles
- Michael Harney as Mitch Ouellette
- Ethan and Gavin Kent as Stevie Ray Botwin
- Amanda Pace as Taylor Grey
- Rachel Pace as Shayla Grey
- Tammy Caplan as Spoons
- Karen Strassman as Jolene Waite
- Gary Anthony Williams as Ed Watson
- Christian Wennberg as Gunder
- Miriam F. Glover as Nancy's Roommate
- Charlotte Bjornbak as Renata
- Debra Mooney as Shelby Keene
- Roy Abramsohn as Rick Levine
- Mel Fair as Scott Price-Gray
- Seth Isler as Melnick
- John Fleck as Agent Lipschitz
- Alex Schemmer as Denny
- Eric Nenninger as Dimtri's Thug #1
- Ian Reed Kesler as Dimtri's Thug #2
- Roy Werner as Greg Hillegas
- Jon Collin Barclay as Barton Bailey
- Melvin Abston as Tyson Betz
- Blaise Embry as Alex
- Brendan Ford as Colm Mulcahey
- Michael Emanuel as Stability House Front Desk
- Tom Simmons as Dr. Palmer
- Peter Chen as Mr. Yu

== Episodes ==
No. overall	No. in season	Title	Directed by	Written by	Intertitle	Original release date	US viewers (millions)
77	1	"Bags"	Scott Ellis	Jenji Kohan	Steam from sauna coals	June 27, 2011	1.19
Three years later, Nancy is released early from prison and paroled to a halfway house in New York City. She learns that Esteban was killed in prison and that his drug cartel has disbanded. Andy, Shane and Doug return to New York upon learning of Nancy's release. Silas is initially reluctant to visit Nancy, but he decides to follow them to New York under the guise of advancing his modeling career. After talking with Jill and Stevie via Skype, she sets out on a scavenger hunt at the behest of her romantic partner, Zoya, from prison. She takes possession of a cache of military-grade weapons hidden in a car trunk.
78	2	"From Trauma Cometh Something"	Michael Trim	Carly Mensch	Subway passenger's jacket and seat graffiti	July 4, 2011	0.62
The Botwins arrive at Nancy's halfway house. Nancy is taken by surprise, and she sneaks out through the back door. Andy and Shane wait for Nancy, unbeknownst that she is not in the building; Ed tells them that Nancy likely changed for the worse while in prison. Doug visits an old college friend, who invites him to a job interview. Silas convinces a modeling agent to sign him on as a client. After failing a job interview, Nancy visits Zoya's brother, Demetri. He agrees to sell her one pound of marijuana, in exchange for returning the cache of stolen explosives that Zoya wanted to sell to a Russian mafia. Nancy reunites with Andy and Shane at the halfway house and confesses having smoked pot with Demetri. Overhearing this, Ed drags her to his office for a drug test.
79	3	"Game-Played"	Scott Ellis	Victoria Morrow	Animal marionette theatre	July 11, 2011	0.78
After testing positive for marijuana use, Ed arranges for Nancy to attend anti-drug classes run by Ms. Keene. Jill tells Nancy that she intends to seek full custody of Stevie. At Nancy's urging, Shane obtains admission to the City College of New York. Doug gets a job as a CPA from his college friend. Silas gets his first gig as an underwear model in New York City, but he storms out in an angry fit after he almost suffocates during the shoot. Andy lands a date with the shoot's producer, Maxeen. Nancy trades Zoya's weapons for pot from Demetri and discovers an opening in the sales market. When Silas discovers that Nancy is dealing again, he manipulates her to obtain a cut in her action.
80	4	"A Hole in Her Niqab"	Eric Jewett	David Holstein	Photocopier print-outs	July 18, 2011	0.67
As Jill pressures Nancy for custody of Stevie, Nancy obtains the pro bono help of lawyer Steward Havens. Andy starts a casual relationship with Maxeen; she is in a polyamorous marriage with her husband, Charles, who is dying of cancer. Shane uses his student loan money to build a bedroom in their apartment for Nancy. After ending his modeling career, Silas revels in his new, equal partnership with Nancy. While Nancy shuts down a rival pot dealer, Silas gives away all of Nancy's pot in free samples to build a client base. Needing to sell the product, they both borrow $1,000 from Shane to buy more; unfortunately, an incident in Afghanistan involving a defiled niqab disrupts Demetri's marijuana supply chain. Doug starts steroids to prepare for corporate softball and hires Nancy as an assistant. The CEO makes a romantic move on Nancy, but he pulls back after she outs the firm's pot dealer.
81	5	"Fingers Only Meat Banquet"	Scott Ellis	Brendan Kelly	Beefsteak slices	July 25, 2011	0.68
Doug discovers irregularities in the bookkeeping at his new company; Tillerman encourages him to overlook them. After saving Charles from a hypoglycemic attack, Andy breaks off his relationship with Maxeen. Nancy and Silas fly to California for a custody hearing. As a legal tactic, Jill's lawyer postpones the hearing for two months. This infuriates Nancy as intended, and she storms to Jill's house to make a scene. Thanks to Silas, Nancy receives an unofficial audience with the family court judge; he encourages her to "return to those who helped you succeed." Nancy visits her old supplier, Heylia, who is not too happy to be seeing Nancy again.
82	6	"Object Impermanence"	Michael Trim	Stephen Falk	Planetarium show	August 1, 2011	0.71
Nancy and Silas ask Heylia to supply them with pot; Heylia threatens them with a gun. Dean is living with Heylia in exchange for legal advice. After Silas reminds Heylia he helped Conrad improve the MILF strain, Heylia agrees to supply Nancy, in exchange for Silas to live with Heylia and help grow the crops. After Doug's company refuses to give Andy start-up money, Shane gives him $80,000 so Andy's business can serve as a front for Nancy's operation. While taking classes in applied criminology, Shane impresses a NYPD investigator, Mitch Ouellette, with his observational skills. Scott arranges for Nancy to visit Stevie before she returns to NYC.
83	7	"Vehement v. Vigorous"	Scott Ellis	Carly Mensch	Boxing match	August 8, 2011	0.69
Silas returns to New York with thirty pounds of MILF weed. He spars with Nancy over the marijuana selling business; Silas has plans for a large and elaborate messenger structure that insulates the Botwins from their sales force, while Nancy, who needs to make money quickly, pushes for a smaller and more direct approach. Silas turns to a modeling agent for messengers to sell MILF weed. Andy resents that Nancy is trying to use his bike shop as a cover business. Ouellette hires Shane as an intern. Doug is suffering the side-effects of anabolic steroids. Agents from the SEC make Nancy an offer; they will get her an early release, in exchange for becoming an informant against Chuck. Zoya is out of prison and catches Nancy making out with Demetri.
84	8	"Synthetics"	Michael Trim	Victoria Morrow	Figurines on display shelf	August 15, 2011	0.67
Nancy reaffirms her commitment to Zoya; however, she is not happy to see Zoya and continues her affair. Zoya prevents Nancy from taking her delivery of drugs from Demetri. Nancy must commit to being a SEC informant; she agrees to wear a wire while on a date with Chuck. Shane and Ouellette stakeout the detective's step-son. As Andy's business grows, he and Silas spar over their separate businesses. Denny and Emma give Silas a shakedown warning; Emma expresses a romantic interest in Silas. When Chuck and Nancy visit the Botwins' flat, Demetri brings a large cache of pot, and a discussion of the Botwin's pot business ensues. Seconds later, Zoya arrives and introduces herself as Nancy's business partner. When she discovers that Chuck took Nancy on a date, she threatens Chuck's life. The entire conversation at the flat is recorded by the SEC agents.
85	9	"Cats! Cats! Cats!"	Michael Trim	David Holstein	Title cards at vaudeville show	August 22, 2011	0.72
Nancy tells Chuck that the SEC is investigating him. Before he flees, Chuck gives Nancy the keys to his townhouse. During a shakedown meeting with her SEC handler, Doug arrives and informs him that the solvency of the government's pension plan is dependent upon Vehement's success. Doug and Nancy are released. Nancy, wanting Zoya to leave, burns down Chuck's townhouse (Zoya is a known arsonist and threatened to incinerate Chuck on the wiretap). Afterwards, Nancy tells Zoya that she will be a prime suspect for the arson and sends Zoya to Burlington. Shane steals intelligence on Pouncy House and delivers it to Nancy; Nancy ignores it. When Ouellette discovers the theft, he arrests Shane. After telling Emma that he is not shutting down his operation, Silas takes her to breakfast. When she expresses dissatisfaction with working for Denny, Silas offers her a job and gives her a tour of his facility. Silas reads the NYPD file on Pouncy House and discovers that Emma actually runs the operation. He then discovers that his office has been raided.
86	10	"System Overhead"	Scott Ellis	Brendan Kelly	Doug holding cue cards	August 29, 2011	0.80
Andy and Nancy grill Silas, who gave Emma access to the back office. When Nancy refuses a delivery from Demetri, he threatens to muscle out Pouncy House. Nancy visits Shane in jail. Emma and Silas agree to a merger. He will supply the weed; she will run sales and distribution. Nancy manipulates Ouellette into busting Pouncy House by abusing his connection to Shane. Jolene Wait of the SEC arrives at Vehement to investigate the government's pension plan. She inadvertently learns from Doug and Tillerman that Chuck disappeared with a large amount of cash.
87	11	"Une Mère que j'aimerais baiser"	Eric Jewett	Roberto Benabib & Matthew Salsberg	Pouring soda can	September 12, 2011	0.75
Doug and Tillerman take Andy to the Hamptons to find new clients for Vehement to fleece. Andy poses as Bill Sussman, a wealthy man who made a lot of money with Vehement. Nancy rebrands her product as "Une Mère que j'aimerais baiser", an overpriced, ultra-exclusive marijuana strain. After Doug and Tillerman discover that Chuck has already fleeced everyone at the party, Nancy offers to cut them into her action. Knowing the raid of Pouncy House is imminent, Nancy rejects merging with them; this infuriates Silas, as he doesn't want to be Nancy's employee with Nancy making the decisions. Emma offers Silas a job, but he turns her down. Denny and Emma are arrested during the raid on Pouncy House. When Shane tells Silas that Nancy made the deal that leads to Emma's arrest, Silas takes a copy of the Botwin's sales database to start his own syndicate. Silas tells Nancy, "Consider me the competition. Everything is up for grabs."
88	12	"Qualitative Spatial Reasoning"	Scott Ellis	Stephen Falk	Display on broken laptop screen	September 19, 2011	0.52
Nancy and Silas compete to recruit talent. Nancy picks up Alex, Demetri, Doug, Kiko, Shane, and Tillerman. Silas signs up Andy, Emma (released on bail), and Heylia. Emma and Silas reconcile romantically over their anger with Nancy. Andy and Silas have an awkward visit with Demetri to buy pot; Nancy secretly listens to the whole conversation and resolves to win big against them. Dean and Heylia visit NYC to deliver MILF to Silas, but they are jacked by men wearing Sarah Palin masks. Nancy pitches Vehement on selling pot at exorbitant prices through an exclusive messenger service staffed by Kiko's gorgeous female models. Nancy discovers that Demetri's friends stole from Silas; Nancy thinks Demetri went too far and tries to partially reconcile with Silas. Shane manipulates a meeting between Ouellette and his son. Emma visits Ouellette and tells him how Nancy played him. Judge Franklin, on the verge of granting Nancy full-custody of Stevie, calls Nancy with the good news. Silas hatches a revenge plot against Nancy by using Jill's desire for custody. Heylia develops her own plan, but postpones giving Silas his chance. After Andy learns that Charles has died, he drops his partnership with Silas.
89	13	"Do Her/Don't Do Her"	Michael Trim	Jenji Kohan	Graffiti on a coffin	September 26, 2011	0.56
Jill confronts and blackmails Nancy; if Nancy signs the custodial papers, then she will not report Nancy to the police. Silas realizes he made a horrible mistake by contacting Jill. Heylia threatens Nancy at gunpoint; she demands that Nancy deliver all of her weed back by that evening, or be killed. Nancy and Jill go to Demetri's apartment to retrieve the weed, and discover that Demetri has been arrested for robbery. After some coaxing, Demetri's military buddies return all but ounce. Nancy returns the weed to Heylia. Ouellette grills Shane on his scheming; he declares his fervent intention to arrest Nancy. Doug, shortly before being made CFO of Vehement, finds out that Chuck drunkenly told about the hedge fund scheme. Silas apologizes to Nancy. Jill and Andy discuss custody options, and they make a decision. Two months later in Connecticut, the Botwin and Price-Grey families are living together. Shane is training to be an NYPD police officer. During a family dinner, a sniper in the bushes aims a scope at Nancy and shoots her in the head.
