= Weeds season 6 =

Weeds
- Season 6
- DVD cover
- No. of episodes: 13

Release
- Original network: Showtime
- Original release: August 16 – November 15, 2010

Season chronology
- ← Previous; Season 5 Next → Season 7

The sixth season of Weeds premiered on August 16, 2010, on the television cable network Showtime, and consisted of 13 episodes.

== Plot ==
After Shane kills Pilar, the Botwin family flees north. Andy joins them after Audra breaks off their relationship. Unable to enter Canada without the baby's birth certificate, Nancy, Andy, Silas, Shane, and Stevie assume new identities as "The Newmans" (as Nathalie, Randy, Mike, Shawn, and Avi, respectively) and settle in Seattle, Washington.

Nancy, Andy, and Silas take menial jobs as scab labor at a local hotel, where Nancy discovers the resident drug dealer is also on strike. Sensing an opportunity, Nancy seeks out a local distributor and, lacking money to buy marijuana, instead buys the seller's trimmings and produces hashish using the hotel's laundry equipment. Back in southern California, Esteban tasks Cesar and Ignacio with finding Nancy and bringing back Stevie. While looking for clues at the Ren Mar house, they encounter Doug and coerce him into helping find the Botwins.

Nancy and Andy are questioned by police officers about unpaid parking tickets linked to the stolen license plates on Andy's minivan. Nancy convinces Silas to steal his girlfriend's car, and the family flees again. Cesar and Ignacio receive a phone call from Doug about the location of Andy's van; they travel to Seattle and search for clues in the van. At their motel, Nancy spots Doug tied up in the back of Cesar's car. Panicked, Nancy attempts to gather the family: a series of events transpires, culminating with Shane calling his mother to tell her he has been kidnapped by Cesar and Ignacio.

Cesar negotiates a trade with Nancy: Shane for Stevie. Despite agreeing, Nancy meets Cesar with a crossbow, and shoots Cesar in the leg. She receives a phone call from Ignacio, who unintentionally tells her about his run-in with the rest of her family at a local restaurant. When Nancy arrives at the restaurant, she attempts to negotiate with Ignacio by holding a gun under the table. Ignacio calls her bluff – Shane then takes the gun, and Ignacio reluctantly folds to Shane. The Botwin family (and Doug) continue to flee; they purchase a used RV and travel to an out-of-the-way trailer park. Nancy goes to a local bar and has sex with the married bartender. When it is revealed that the bartender's wife is a neighbor, the Botwins are subsequently chased out of town.

In Colorado, the family continues to bargain for the trimmings of other dealers' weed. When Stevie's feces are an abnormal color, Nancy visits a pediatrician. The doctor says Stevie is fine, but suggests the baby may not be bonding with Nancy, and that the baby's lifestyle could be a factor, making Nancy rethink their way of life.

The group travels to Nancy's hometown, Dearborn, Michigan, where they stay with Nancy's former high school teacher, Mr. Schiff (Richard Dreyfuss), with whom she had a sexual relationship from the age of 14. Silas discovers that Judah is not his biological father, but that his father is Nancy's former boyfriend, Lars. The Botwins are found by an investigative journalist named Vaughn, who is writing an article about Nancy. She gives him the information he needs to write the story, in exchange for cash to buy passports. Doug returns to Agrestic, retitled Regrestic after the fire, where he tries to win back his wife. Mr. Schiff steals money from a post office for plane tickets to Copenhagen for the family, himself included. Nancy goes to meet Vaughn a final time before leaving, only to find his room has been ransacked; Esteban and Guillermo are waiting for her.

Esteban and Guillermo take Nancy to the airport to find Stevie. Nancy manages to contact Andy, telling him to use "Plan C". Esteban threatens Silas and takes Stevie; Nancy agrees to leave the airport with them, and they tell her they are going to kill her. Andy, Silas, Shane and Mr. Schiff board the plane to Copenhagen, but Mr. Schiff is arrested for the post office robbery. As Nancy leaves the airport, they are confronted by the FBI. As part of "Plan C", Nancy confesses to the murder of Pilar, simultaneously saving her own life, ensuring the safety of her family, and covering for Shane.

== Cast ==
=== Main cast ===
- Mary-Louise Parker as Nancy Botwin (13 episodes)
- Hunter Parrish as Silas Botwin (13 episodes)
- Alexander Gould as Shane Botwin (13 episodes)
- Justin Kirk as Andy Botwin (13 episodes)
- Kevin Nealon as Doug Wilson (10 episodes)

=== Special guest stars ===
- Jennifer Jason Leigh as Jill Price-Grey
- Demián Bichir as Esteban Reyes
- Guillermo Díaz as Guillermo García Gómez
- Alanis Morissette as Dr. Audra Kitson
- Linda Hamilton as Linda
- Peter Stormare as Chef

=== Recurring cast ===
- Richard Dreyfuss as Warren Schiff
- Andy Milder as Dean Hodes
- Renée Victor as Lupita
- Enrique Castillo as Cesar de la Cruz
- Hemky Madera as Ignacio Morero, Jr.
- John Fleck as Agent Lipschitz
- Eric Lange as Vaughn Coleman
- Rick Ravanello as Lars Guinard
- Assaf Cohen as Hooman Jaka
- Matt Peters as Gayle
- Aisha Hinds as Latrice
- Jessica St. Clair as Rebekkah
- Jama Williamson as Allison
- Jamie Renée Smith as Kimmi
- Sugar Lyn Beard as Fiona
- David Diaan as Daoud Mahmud
- Ayelet Ben-Shahar as Adara
- Marian Filali as Rida
- Ed Corbin as Police Officer
- Monette McGrath as Cheryl
- Chris Marquette as Trip
- Adam Rose as Joe Knock
- Fred Cross as Translator
- Paul Hayes as Sheriff

== Episodes ==
No. overall	No. in season	Title	Directed by	Written by	Intertitle	Original release date	US viewers (millions)
64	1	"Thwack"	Scott Ellis	Jenji Kohan	Frozen concentrated orange juice with money inside	August 16, 2010	1.26
After Shane murders Pilar, Nancy must think fast to protect her family. After collecting what she can from Esteban's house, the Botwins go to Ren Mar to swap her hybrid car for Andy's van. When Nancy arrives, she discovers that Gayle, the psychotic anti-abortionist, is holding Audra hostage. Nancy executes a plan that subdues Gayle, but Audra breaks up with Andy for fleeing when Gayle arrived, leaving her at his mercy. Silas is disturbed by his younger brother's lack of remorse for killing Pilar. The Botwins hit the road. Cesar sees the video footage of Shane murdering Pilar and decides to cover it up.
65	2	"Felling and Swamping"	Scott Ellis	Victoria Morrow	Convenience store snacks	August 23, 2010	1.04
Nancy decides to hide her family from Esteban by moving to Canada. En route, she chastises Shane for murdering Pilar. After being turned away at the Canadian border check for not having a birth certificate for Stevie, Nancy learns that the FBI have been brought in to investigate Pilar's murder. Ultimately, the Botwins find themselves in a motel in Seattle where they forge new identities for themselves. The Botwins become the Newmans—Nancy is Nathalie, Shane is Sean, Silas is Mike, Andy is Randy, and Stevie is Avi. Nancy pledges to make their new life as normal as possible. Meanwhile, Esteban must deal with the authorities while trying to track down his missing wife and son.
66	3	"A Yippity Sippity"	Tate Donovan	Brendan Kelly	Hotel card-key	August 30, 2010	1.02
Nancy, Andy and Silas become scab workers at a Seattle hotel while the regular staff is on strike. As a maid, Nancy must clean up an unappealing mess. Andy is assigned dishwasher duty and has problems with the head chef. Silas is assigned bellhop duty and is given an unusual proposition from a wealthy patron. While on the job, Nancy jumps at an opportunity to gain extra income by selling hash. While Shane babysits Stevie, he steals a luxury baby stroller. Back in Ren Mar, Cesar and Ignacio confront Doug with a gun when he enters the Botwin's house looking for them.
67	4	"Bliss"	Eric Jewett	Stephen Falk	Body charms	September 13, 2010	0.96
The Newmans begin to settle into their new life. Nancy makes a deal with the hotel concierge to supply hash to guests. Shane makes nice with a group of mothers at the park; to gain sympathy, he claims he is Stevie's father and that Stevie's mother was a service member who was killed by an IED blast in Iraq. Silas becomes interested in college. After being interrogated by Cesar and Ignacio, Doug unwittingly leads them to a homeless man who found Andy's old cell phone. Ignacio accidentally kills the homeless man, and Doug must help Cesar dispose of the body. Andy is promoted to sous-chef, and he reluctantly supplies Nancy with used cooking oil, who uses it to barter for weed with a hippie grandmother and her daughter. On their way back from the trade, Nancy and Andy are confronted by cops.
68	5	"Boomerang"	Scott Ellis	Stephen Falk	Initials carved in tree	September 20, 2010	0.83
After her van has been booted by the cops and, fearing the authorities will eventually track them down due to Andy registering the van in Silas' name, Nancy decides to leave Seattle behind. Silas is devastated about having to leave a normal life behind so soon after settling down. One of the mothers in the mommy group discovers that Shane's story about Stevie's mother was a lie; Shane threatens the women in an attempt to prevent them from calling Child Protective Services. The mommy group calls in CPS anyway to take Stevie. Cesar and Ignacio, with Doug in tow, manage to track the Botwins to their motel and take Shane hostage. Latrice, Nancy's rival at the hotel, and her boyfriend, Quentin, discover her scheme and decide to get even for being left out.
69	6	"A Shoe for a Shoe"	Michael Trim	David Holstein	Restaurant place mats	September 27, 2010	0.99
Nancy manages to dodge the situation with Latrice and convince CPS not to take Stevie away. Cesar suggests a trade off: Stevie for Shane. Ignacio takes Shane and Doug to wait in a diner where Andy, Silas and Stevie have coincidentally wait for Nancy. Ignacio discovers the three Botwin men and take them hostage. Nancy shoots Cesar in the leg with a crossbow and takes his gun. Nancy goes to the diner, where she winds up in a Mexican standoff with Ignacio while negotiating the freedom of her family. Ignacio is sure she won't shoot him, until Shane takes the gun from her. Ignacio, acquainted with Shane's dark side, lets them go. The Botwins, reunited with Doug, find themselves on the run once again in Cesar's car.
70	7	"Pinwheels and Whirligigs"	Mike Uppendahl	Carly Mensch	Blocks of butter at the fair	October 4, 2010	0.68
Agent Lipschitz interviews Cesar, who is in the hospital. The Botwins and Doug (now Ted Newman) have made it to Montana. Over Andy's objections, Nancy decides to take a break from running and treat the family to an afternoon at a local fair. Andy and Silas enter themselves in a butter sculpture eating contest to win a luxury class RV. Andy admires Silas' venture to a college campus and his skill at formulating quality joints. Nancy and Shane discuss Pilar's murder and tries to lay down boundaries. Simultaneously, Shane makes Nancy see the similarities between them. Silas wins the contest, but is unable to claim the prize because the sponsors of the contest require a social security number.
71	8	"Gentle Puppies"	Scott Ellis	Victoria Morrow	Pioneer City welcome sign	October 11, 2010	0.93
After buying an RV that was once owned by a pastor, the Botwins settle in Pioneer City, a small off-the-grid town. Nancy's growing frustration about their new lifestyle leads her to an out of the way bar, where she gets drunk and has rough sex with the owner Jack. Andy and Doug soon make a reputation in the town when they pass themselves off as pastors, and Shane sets them up with a series of appointments to make money. The next day, Jack's wife shows up and tries to attack Nancy, who was unaware Jack was married. Andy and Doug are exposed as frauds. The townspeople drive the Botwins out of town and they are on the road once again.
72	9	"To Moscow, and Quickly"	Michael Trim	David Holstein & Carly Mensch	Child's crayon drawing on the notebook	October 18, 2010	0.85
Traveling through Colorado, Nancy notices that Stevie's stool has turned green and insists on taking him to see a pediatrician. While peddling hash to parents at a children's concert, Silas tries to teach Shane a lesson about responsibility by making Shane think he had lost the hash money. Doug bonds with some of the concert performers. The doctor's diagnosis for Stevie's condition is not serious, but it begins to make Nancy fear the effect their lifestyle may be having on Stevie, prompting her to make a radical decision: pull off one giant hash sale and move the family to Copenhagen.
73	10	"Dearborn-Again"	Scott Ellis	Roberto Benabib & Matthew Salsberg	Sky Mall catalogue	October 25, 2010	0.80
Nancy returns to her hometown of Dearborn, Michigan and calls upon her old high school teacher Warren Schiff (with whom she had an affair with) to help hide her family while they secure fake passports. After meeting Lars, Nancy's high school boyfriend, Silas starts to doubt that Judah was his real father. Shane swipes Lars's hair brush to order a DNA test. Andy tries and fails to acquire passports; however, he manages to trade the RV with a family who was living out of their car. While visiting her parents' graves, Nancy meets Ellis, who claims he went to high school a few years behind her. To help move the hash, Andy mixes it with alcohol, Red Bull and Ritalin to create a new drug. He tests it on Doug with great success. Ellis is revealed to have been tracking the Botwins, and makes a phone call to an unknown person to say that he has found them.
74	11	"Viking Pride"	Michael Trim	Brendan Kelly & Tara Herrmann	Passport stamp	November 1, 2010	0.99
Hooman Jaka refers Nancy to Daoud Mahmud to buy fake passports. She sends Andy to make the deal with Mr. Mahmud who, in turn, asks Andy to kill Hooman as payment in order to prevent him from marrying his daughter. Silas bonds with Lars, his suspected biological father. Nancy searches through old yearbooks and discovers "Ellis Tate" is deceiving her. She confronts him, and he reveals himself to be Vaughn Coleman, an investigative journalist who plans to write a story about her life. He offers to help expose "the bad guys" before they find her first, and Nancy agrees to go on record about her life for a fee. Andy tells Hooman about Mahmud's offer, and the two decide to help each other.
75	12	"Fran Tarkenton"	David Warren	Stephen Falk	Cadaver toe-tag	November 8, 2010	0.86
Doug returns to Agrestic for his passport, and discovers that his ex-wife Dana has remarried and his children have forgotten him. Andy fakes Hooman's death to trick Mahmud into supplying the passports, but the ruse is unsuccessful. Andy must barter with Mahmud's wife for the passports. A paternity test proves that Lars is Silas's real father, and he decides to stay behind instead of going to Copenhagen. Nancy is interviewed by Vaughn about her life, in return for the money needed to get the family out of the country. She returns the next morning to discover his hotel room has been ransacked. She is ambushed and knocked out by Guillermo and Esteban, who have somehow tracked her down.
76	13	"Theoretical Love Is Not Dead"	Scott Ellis	Jenji Kohan	Gate at airport	November 15, 2010	0.99
Nancy wakes up in the trunk of a car and sees Vaughn's dead body next to her. Esteban and Guillermo take Nancy to the airport, where they plan to find Stevie. While in the airport bathroom, Nancy makes contact with Andy, telling him they are going to use "Plan C." Esteban attempts to buy tickets to get into the terminal and after security is flagged, Nancy takes advantage to get away from the men. Silas shows up at the airport and is taken hostage by Esteban. After Esteban threatens Silas and takes Stevie, Nancy agrees to leave the airport with them, and they tell her that they intend to kill her. Andy, Silas, Shane and Mr. Schiff board the plane to Copenhagen (via Paris), but Mr. Schiff is arrested for robbing a post office (where he got the money to pay for the tickets). As Nancy is being escorted out of the airport by Esteban and Guillermo, the FBI are waiting for them outside. As part of "Plan C", she had Andy call the police to arrest her so she could take credit for the murder of Pilar, thus saving her own life and ensuring the safety of her family.
