= Weeds season 8 =

Weeds
- Season 8
- DVD cover
- No. of episodes: 13

Release
- Original network: Showtime
- Original release: July 1 – September 16, 2012

Season chronology
- ← Previous; Season 7

The eighth and final season of Weeds premiered on July 1, 2012, on the television cable network Showtime, and featured 13 episodes, bringing the series total to 102. It marks the return of the show's theme song, "Little Boxes". Creator Jenji Kohan revealed that cover versions of the song would be used during the opening credits (as during past seasons) and confirmed that Ben Folds and the Mountain Goats would be featured artists. Kohan also confirmed that the song would be covered in a duet by Steve Martin and series regular Kevin Nealon, who each sang and played the banjo. Series co-star Hunter Parrish also provided a cover version for the season's tenth episode. The final two episodes of the season aired back to back as a one-hour series finale, which was the series' first and only one-hour show in its eight-year run.

== Plot ==
Season eight picks up where season seven ended—the family is eating dinner when a concealed sniper targets Nancy through a rifle scope and fires a shot. Nancy, shot in the head, is rushed to the hospital. While she is still unconscious, the shooter, Tim Scottson, son of her late second husband, DEA agent Peter Scottson, visits her. Shane, first a member of the police academy and later an officer, arrests him with his police squad. Nancy's estranged sister Jill sleeps with both Nancy's brother-in-law Andy and Doug. Subsequently, Jill claims to be pregnant but lies and is really going through menopause.

Nancy begins working as a representative at a pharmaceutical company which legally produces medical marijuana for people diagnosed with cancer undergoing radiation therapy. Silas also gets a job growing marijuana at the same company as Nancy.

After Silas starts working at the pharmaceutical company, he finds himself not too pleased with the process his plants have to go through after they are selected. This leads him to contemplate what marijuana really means to him.

After much debate and deliberation, Nancy and Silas realize the industry in which they belong. This realization has them back in Regrestic (formerly Agrestic and Majestic, where the story began). Teaming up with past friends (and enemies) Nancy develops a scheme.

The series finale jumps several years into the future and shows how the lives of the characters have progressed. Marijuana was legalized at an unspecified time during the time jump and as a result the Botwins are running several successful marijuana businesses. Per usual, the series gives a slightly dark twist on the present lives of the characters. Nancy regrets her past, but knows there is nothing she can do to change it. Doug on the other hand, wants to reconcile his past mistakes. In the end, the main characters are huddled together, pondering and reflecting, while enjoying the product that has often caused them so much turmoil and yet made them closer and more appreciative of the unique bond they share.

== Cast ==
=== Main cast ===
- Mary-Louise Parker as Nancy Botwin (13 episodes)
- Hunter Parrish as Silas Botwin (13 episodes)
- Alexander Gould as Shane Botwin (13 episodes)
- Justin Kirk as Andy Botwin (12 episodes)
- Kevin Nealon as Doug Wilson (13 episodes)

=== Special guest stars ===
- Jennifer Jason Leigh as Jill Price-Grey (8 episodes)
- Pablo Schreiber as Demetri Ravitch (1 episode)
- Guillermo Díaz as Guillermo García Gómez (3 episodes)
- Romany Malco as Conrad Shepard (1 episode)
- Justin Chatwin as Josh Wilson (2 episodes)
- Natasha Lyonne as Tiffani (2 episodes)

=== Former cast members ===
Romany Malco returns for one episode as Conrad, who has not been seen since the season 3 finale.

=== Recurring cast ===
- Ethan and Gavin Kent as 4-year-old Stevie Ray Botwin (8 episodes)
- Amanda Pace as Taylor Grey (7 episodes)
- Rachel Pace as Shayla Grey (6 episodes)
- Mateus Ward as 13-year-old Stevie Ray Botwin (2 episodes)
- Shoshannah Stern as Megan Graves (3 episodes)
- Renée Victor as Lupita (1 episode)
- Maulik Pancholy as Sanjay Patel (2 episodes)
- Fatso-Fasano as Marvin (2 episodes)
- Kat Foster as Kiku Logan (3 episodes)
- Becky Thyre as Pam (1 episode)
- Meital Dohan as Yael Hoffman (1 episode)
- Daryl Sabara as Tim Scottson (4 episodes)
- Daniele Watts as Angela Mullen (8 episodes)
- David Julian Hirsh as Rabbi David Bloom (7 episodes)
- Andy Milder as Dean Hodes (2 episodes)
- Julanne Chidi Hill as Clinique (2 episodes)
- Michael Harney as Mitch Ouellette (6 episodes)
- Bruce Nozick as Whit Tillerman (5 episodes)
- Allyn Rachel as Monica (4 episodes)
- Tammy Caplan as Spoons (4 episodes)
- Price Carson as Rudy (3 episodes)
- Nancy Youngblut as Beatrice (3 episodes)
- Ben Tolpin as Zachary (3 episodes)
- Kevin Sussman as Terry (3 episodes)
- Patch Darragh as Crick Montgomery (3 episodes)
- Dominic Dierkes as R.J. (3 episodes)
- Craig Anton as Mark Powell (2 episodes)
- Aubrey Dollar as Joanna Jacobs (2 episodes)
- Jessica 'Sugar' Kiper as Simone Wiles (2 episodes)
- Brady Novak as Craig (2 episodes)
- Jeff Newburg as Greg (2 episodes)
- Daniel Roebuck as Detective Jensen (2 episodes)
- Anne Bellamy as Whimsy Ardmore (2 episodes)
- Max Barakat as Matthew (2 episodes)
- Aaron Zachary Philips as Jonah (2 episodes)
- Calvin Sykes as Jaq (2 episodes)
- Cutter Garcia as Homeless Pete (2 episodes)
- Cecelia Antoinette as Homeless Mary (2 episodes)
- Ryann Turner as Sage (2 episodes)
- Jack Topalian as Pigeon Mike (2 episodes)
- Gloria Laino as Maria (2 episodes)
- Laura Harrison as Cinnamon (2 episodes)
- Saverio Guerra as Jeff (2 episodes)
- Clifford McGhee as Gus (2 episodes)
- Michael Dempsey as Cop (2 episodes)
- Jake Sandvig as Alan Spiller (2 episodes)
- Mel Fair as Scott Price-Grey (2 episodes)
- Bob Rumnock as Mr. Lippman (1 episode)
- Seth Isler as Melnick (1 episode)
- Eric Nenninger as Dimtri's Thug #1 (2 episodes)
- Ian Reed Kesler as Dimtri's Thug #2 (2 episodes)
- Jon Collin Barclay as Barton Bailey (2 episodes)
- Brendan Robinson as Gordon (2 episodes)

== Episodes ==
| No. overall | No. in season | Title | Directed by | Written by | Theme song performer(s) | Original release date | US viewers (millions) |
|---|---|---|---|---|---|---|---|
| 90 | 1 | "Messy" | Michael Trim | Jenji Kohan | Malvina Reynolds | July 1, 2012 | 0.81 |
Nancy is rushed to the hospital after being shot in the head. Shane chases after the shooter, but quickly loses him. The doctors put Nancy in a chemically induced coma to protect her brain. After comparing lists of suspects for the shooting, Shane reveals to Silas that he is training to be a police officer instead of going to college. A grief-stricken Andy renews his sexual relationship with Jill. The shooter, who is revealed to be Tim Scottson, visits Nancy late at night and expresses his regret; Nancy suddenly begins to emerge from her medically induced coma.
| 91 | 2 | "A Beam of Sunshine" | Michael Trim | Victoria Morrow | Ben Folds | July 8, 2012 | 0.61 |
After seventy-seven days in the hospital, Nancy is almost ready to be released. She has an epiphany about her life and decides that she and her family will change for the better. She begins handing out her own pot cookies for free. Jill's ex-husband, Scott, catches her and Andy having sex and storms out. Silas is dubious about his mother's new outlook on life. Shane takes a shining to a fellow cop-in-training and figures out the identity of Nancy's shooter. Nancy conquers the staircase and is released.
| 92 | 3 | "See Blue and Smell Cheese and Die" | Julie Anne Robinson | David Holstein | Steve Martin & Kevin Nealon | July 15, 2012 | 0.78 |
Scott and Andy have a brief fight. Shane leaves a note for Nancy revealing that he is searching for the shooter. They discover that Tim had visited Nancy in the hospital. Nancy and Silas assume that Shane plans to kill Tim and rush to stop him. After visiting Tim's girlfriend, they find Tim at a Subway restaurant that he works at and instruct him to travel back to Agrestic, California. Shortly after arriving at his house to pack, Shane and his police squad arrive and arrest Tim.
| 93 | 4 | "Only Judy Can Judge" | Michael Trim | Carly Mensch | Mariachi El Bronx | July 22, 2012 | 0.57 |
Nancy is losing touch with Stevie, so she plans a trip to the zoo; things get interrupted when Kiku calls. Silas makes a new friend. Shane invites his new girlfriend Angela, who is also in the police academy, to dinner. Andy and Jill are involved in a fight.
| 94 | 5 | "Red in Tooth and Claw" | Michael Trim | Stephen Falk | The Mountain Goats | July 29, 2012 | 0.48 |
As Nancy tries to collect cash for Stevie's soccer games, she desires to deal marijuana again; she decides to control her compulsions this time. Because Andy had sex with a gothic lady, Jill tries to retaliate by sleeping with Doug. Meanwhile, Shane and Angela have an awkward double date with Ouellette and his wife. Silas and R.J. encounter an awkward discussion which makes Silas feel uncomfortable. R.J. gets mad at Silas for the way he reacted and steals his marijuana plants.
| 95 | 6 | "Allosaurus Crush Castle" | Julie Anne Robinson | Brendan Kelly | Bomb the Music Industry! | August 5, 2012 | 0.64 |
Nancy tries to find legal work. She experiences some difficulty until she spots what she thinks is a drug deal by a father at Stevie's soccer game. Meanwhile, Jill reveals that she is pregnant with either Andy or Doug's child. Silas attempts to retrieve his pilfered plants and Shane decides to earn additional spending money. Instead of retrieving the plants, Nancy gets both Silas and herself a job at a pharmaceutical company through the father at the soccer match.
| 96 | 7 | "Unfreeze" | Perry Lang | Victoria Morrow | The Womenfolk | August 12, 2012 | 0.56 |
Silas begins his initial day of work legally, professionally growing marijuana, while Andy seeks employment. Doug receives his comeuppance for his charity fraud. Nancy begins working at a marketing company that sells a marijuana-based compound for cancer victims undergoing radiation therapy. Shane graduates from the police academy and shows his uniform to Nancy.
| 97 | 8 | "Five Miles From Yetzer Hara" | Phil Abraham | David Holstein | The Thermals | August 19, 2012 | 0.77 |
Nancy is offered a promotion for her successes, but is tempted by the idea to sell the pills she gets. Doug, using Meritor, manages to set up a fake homeless shelter by drugging a hostile homeless woman. Andy and Jill have a falling out after the latter reveals that she is not pregnant, but rather, is going through menopause and hid this fact for several weeks. Teaming up, Nancy and Jill con the former's company by faking a break-in of her company car, allowing them to sell the medicine at her university party. Silas, meanwhile, is troubled by the thought of his product becoming a pill.
| 98 | 9 | "Saplings" | Michael Trim | Carly Mensch | Dierks Bentley | August 26, 2012 | 0.68 |
In New York, Shane and Angela find themselves in a compromising situation. In North Carolina, Nancy and Silas visit with a tobacco protege who wants Silas's product in a cigarette. Back home, Doug micromanages the homeless in order to maintain an 85% occupancy rate at his "shelter" to appease Social Services. Andy and Rabbi Dave discuss women, leading Andy to make a strange commitment.
| 99 | 10 | "Threshold" | Eric Jewett | Brendan Kelly | Hunter Parrish | September 2, 2012 | 0.61 |
Silas and Nancy find a new form for an old business venture which leaves them in the green; Doug also finds himself slipping into past habits for dealing with his homeless people. Meanwhile, Andy is having trouble connecting with Joanna as Shane and Angela deal with both sides of the law.
| 100 | 11 | "God Willing and the Creek Don't Rise" | Uta Briesewitz | Stephen Falk | Aimee Mann | September 9, 2012 | 0.69 |
Nancy, Andy, and Silas return to Agrestic and Majestic, now rebuilt & renamed "Regrestic". Nancy meets up with Conrad to see if he would grow MILF weed for her again, but trouble comes when she finds out that Guillermo is out of prison and in charge again. Silas runs into Megan and comes clean about poking holes in his condoms so she would get pregnant; the two make up and get back together. Andy goes looking for Yael, who does not remember him. Shane is arrested for car theft, which turns out to be a setup by Ouellette to test his loyalty. Doug decides to start a religious cult. Andy announces to Nancy that he had made the decision to leave her for good; the two experience a passionate sexual encounter at the same spot where Judah had his heart attack. Despite Nancy's tearful pleas, Andy leaves.
| 101 | 12 | "It's Time" | Michael Trim | Jenji Kohan | Malvina Reynolds | September 16, 2012 | 0.86 |
| 102 | 13 | "It's Time" | Michael Trim | Jenji Kohan | Malvina Reynolds | September 16, 2012 | 0.86 |
The series has a flash forward to the year 2022, marijuana has been legalized, and Nancy's chain of marijuana shops is overwhelmingly successful. Nancy is widowed for the fourth time, having married Rabbi Dave who subsequently died in a car crash. Doug has created a cult following, which, paired with his share in Nancy's business, has made him prosperous. Silas and Megan are married and have a baby daughter. Andy is also a shareholder in Nancy's business, but he has completely estranged himself from her, living back in Ren Mar with his child. Shane, who has become a detective, is a bitter alcoholic, having remained Ouellette's closest friend and following in his footsteps. Nancy worries that Andy will not show up to Stevie's bar mitzvah. Guillermo tells Stevie the truth about his father being a drug cartel kingpin, much to Stevie's shock. Doug decides to reconnect with his estranged gay son Josh, and the two reconcile. At Stevie's bar mitzvah, Stevie stuns the guests with his speech informing everyone of his true father's past, his lack of faith and his desire to attend boarding school. Nancy obliges Stevie's request to go to boarding school, despite the possibility of being lonely with the rest of her family moving on. At Stevie's after party, Nancy begs Andy to come back, even offering him her share of the company. He declines. Nancy also talks to Silas; he comforts her by admitting that, although she wasn't the best mother, he doesn't regret his childhood. Nancy tells Shane to fix his life, who agrees to take time off and go to rehabilitation. Nancy decides to give up the weed business, and she agrees to sell her company. During his party, Stevie thanks everyone for their contributions in his life, and he offers a heartfelt thank you to Nancy. Nancy retires to the porch to be alone; she is joined by Doug, Silas, Shane, and Andy, and they all share a joint.

== Production ==
Showtime officially renewed Weeds for an eighth season on November 10, 2011. Creator and showrunner Jenji Kohan alongside the other series producers convened for story meetings and were informed early on in the writing process that Showtime Entertainment President David Nevins would not be renewing the show for a ninth season. "It did change how we talked about the season so far. We're building toward something different than we might have built toward had we been in the dark," commented Kohan.

For the first time since the fourth season, the show featured the Malvina Reynolds song Little Boxes as its theme music, along with a new opening title sequence. The original title sequence was briefly revived in episode 11 with the notable difference of signs reading Regrestic rather than Agrestic and Majestic. Like seasons two and three, different bands and artists were used to cover the song for each episode. Moreover, Julie Anne Robinson, who had not directed an episode since season four, directed two episodes this season. In addition, Perry Lang, who had not directed an episode since season three, directed an episode this season.

The season's first episode, "Messy", was made available online through Showtime's "Freeview" Facebook page a week before the broadcast premiere.

== Reception ==
This season earned 57 out of 100 on Metacritic, indicating mixed reviews.
