= List of Weeds characters =

This is a list of characters from the television series Weeds.

Actor	Role	Seasons							
Actor	Role	1	2	3	4	5	6	7	8
Mary-Louise Parker	Nancy Botwin	Main	Main	Main	Main	Main	Main	Main	Main
Justin Kirk	Andy Botwin	Main	Main	Main	Main	Main	Main	Main	Main
Hunter Parrish	Silas Botwin	Main	Main	Main	Main	Main	Main	Main	Main
Alexander Gould	Shane Botwin	Main	Main	Main	Main	Main	Main	Main	Main
Kevin Nealon	Doug Wilson	Main	Main	Main	Main	Main	Main	Main	Main
Elizabeth Perkins	Celia Hodes	Main	Main	Main	Main	Main			
Romany Malco	Conrad Shepard	Main	Main	Main					Guest
Tonye Patano	Heylia James	Main	Main	Main				Guest	
Indigo	Vaneeta James	Main	Main	Main					
Renée Victor	Lupita	Main	Main	Guest	Guest	Guest	Guest		Guest
Shoshannah Stern	Megan Graves	Main	Main						Guest
Martin Donovan	Peter Scottson	Guest	Main						
Allie Grant	Isabelle Hodes	Recurring	Recurring	Main	Main	Main			
Andy Milder	Dean Hodes	Recurring	Recurring	Main	Guest	Guest	Guest	Guest	Guest
Fatso-Fasano	Marvin		Guest	Main	Guest				Guest
Page Kennedy	Louis "U-turn" Wardell		Guest	Main					
Matthew Modine	Sullivan Groff			Main					
Jack Stehlin	Captain Roy Till		Recurring	Recurring	Recurring	Recurring			
Enrique Castillo	Cesar de la Cruz				Main	Main	Main		
Hemky Madera	Ignacio Morero Jr.				Main	Main	Main		
Demián Bichir	Esteban Reyes				Main	Main	Guest		
Guillermo Díaz	Guillermo García Gómez			Guest	Main	Guest	Guest		Guest
Mateus Ward; Ethan and Gavin Kent	Stevie Ray Botwin					Main	Main	Main	Main
Kate del Castillo	Pilar Zuazo					Main			
Jennifer Jason Leigh	Jill Price-Grey					Guest	Guest	Main	Main
Rachel Pace	Shayla Grey					Guest		Main	Main
Amanda Pace	Taylor Grey					Guest		Main	Main

== The Botwin family ==
=== Nancy Botwin ===
Nancy Botwin (Mary-Louise Parker, leading character)—also known as Lacey LaPlante (season two) and Nathalie Newman (season six)—was a PTA soccer mom until her husband, Judah, suddenly died of a heart attack. To maintain the upper middle-class lifestyle to which she was accustomed in the fictional town of Agrestic, Nancy entered the world of marijuana dealing. At the start, her regular clients include her accountant, her lawyer, and fellow suburban friends. However, as she expands and fights for survival, she is confronted with the violent realities of her business as she jockeys against competitors, gangs, and drug lords. Adding complications to the situation, are her sudden relationship with Peter Scottson, a DEA agent who discovers Nancy's business, but takes measures to ensure her safety. Peter grew increasingly hostile towards Nancy and is eventually killed. Eventually, Nancy works for a gangster named U-Turn. During one of her runs for him, she meets Guillermo, a Mexican drug trafficker, who offers her a chance to move up in the drug game. Nancy declines, but changes her mind when a huge fire spreads into the Agrestic town. Nancy takes advantage of the fire and burns down her house, ensuring that her family will be leaving and moving on.

At the start of season four, Nancy eagerly jumps at the chance to transport marijuana across the Mexican border for Guillermo, but she feels uneasy about other transporting duties, such as smuggling heroin and child prostitutes. These qualms and other factors put her at odds with the "chain of command" within the drug cartel and lead to Nancy blatantly violating its rules. However, her insubordination leads to a romance with Esteban Reyes, a corrupt Mayor of Tijuana. Her attempt to shut down a tunnel almost leads to her death during the season four cliffhanger. Nancy takes a break from dealing in season five while building a relationship with Esteban, eventually giving birth to his only son. Complications arise with Esteban's boss Pilar Zuazo at the end of the fifth season, and the family is forced into living on the run from Esteban and his men, as well as the American and Mexican authorities. They visit Seattle, Washington, where Nancy learns how to make hashish, a concentrated form of marijuana, and sells it as a means of income during their trips to Montana and Michigan until Nancy and her family are discovered. The season six finale has the male Botwins on a plane to Europe, while Nancy goes through with Plan "C". This is her last possible solution, to keep Esteban away, in which she turns herself into the police, for the sake of her family.

After falsely pleading guilty to manslaughter, Nancy is sentenced to Danbury prison, where she maintains a romantic relationship with Zoya, her prison roommate. During season seven, after three years of lockup, Nancy is released to a halfway house in New York City. She immediately betrays Zoya by trading Zoya's stash of stolen grenades with Zoya's brother, Demetri, for an initial supply of weed. During the season, Andy, Doug, Silas, and Shane travel to New York, interested in seeing Nancy. She eventually rises from the lower end of the economic scale and is released from her halfway house, from which she continues to expand her drug business. She once again jockeys against the leading dealers in New York and rises to the top. The season seven finale follows her fighting for the custody of Esteban's child with Jill, her sister. They eventually agree to move in together in Old Greenwich, Connecticut. As the closing of escrow is finalized, Nancy and her family eat dinner peacefully, and Nancy then gives a toast to the family's future. Subsequently, an armed man, later identified as Tim Scottson, shoots Nancy in the head with his rifle. Nancy recovers from the gunshot in season eight. In the series finale, after a ten-year time jump, it is revealed that marijuana has been legalized, and Nancy owns several successful marijuana businesses.

At the beginning of the series, Nancy struggles to keep her drug dealing separate from her family life. However, Andy, Silas, and Shane find out about her dealing at different points in the series. While she is willing to risk life and limb for the love of her family, she also wants to protect them from the hazards of drugs and the drug trade. She is particularly hesitant to allow Silas to enter the business until her crisis with U-Turn forces her to allow Silas to deal. She also struggles to keep Shane isolated from the chaos.

Nancy was married four times and gave birth to three children. Her first son, Silas, was conceived out of wedlock with Lars Guinard. Judah Botwin, her first husband, believed Silas to be his son and raised him from birth. Judah and Nancy later conceived Shane. Peter Scottson, her second husband, was murdered by a rival drug cartel; she and Peter did not have children. She married Esteban after giving birth to Stevie Ray, her third son; Esteban was murdered in prison. Nancy met her last husband, rabbi Dave Bloom, by sneaking into his pool when she needed physical therapy. Dave adopted Stevie as his own son, but died later in a bizarre car crash.

=== Andy Botwin ===
Andrew "Andy" Botwin (Justin Kirk, leading character)—also known as Bill Sussman in seasons three and seven, and as Randy Newman in season six—is Judah's brother, a fun-loving, irresponsible slacker. After Judah's death, Nancy reluctantly allows Andy to live at the house. She realizes that his presence is needed for her business and as a father figure for the children, along with coercing her into letting him stay for as long as he wants after he discovers that she's been selling weed from Heylia. He is also an archetypal Shakespearean 'fool', behaving like a child. For example, in the second season, he takes an eleven-year-old Shane for a hand job to stop the children in his class from tormenting him. Nonetheless, he can occasionally have moments with great insight. By the fifth season, Andy becomes more responsible in response to Nancy's absence as a mother to her children. He discovers that he is in love with Nancy, who does not reciprocate his feelings. He helps Nancy raise her and Esteban's son during their brief breakup, but relinquishes his paternal rights after they reunite. After this, he starts dating, and eventually proposes to Dr. Audra Kitson, but abandons her when they are confronted by her anti-abortionist stalker. After fleeing to Denmark, Andy becomes a tour guide under the name "Wonderful Wonderful Tours". He and the rest go back to the United States to find Nancy in New York City. Andy eventually finds a way to profit off of his own invention of "Copenhagen wheels", designed to make your bicycle supposedly ride "faster". Andy befriends a Rabbi named Dave, after a random encounter in the hospital after Nancy is shot. He pursues a short affair with Jill; they live together after her divorce with her husband, Scott. Jill falsely tests positive for a pregnancy and, in the meantime, she breaks up with Andy and has a one-night stand with Doug. After Jill leaves the entire house to move elsewhere, the rest of the group visits Agrestic (re-titled Regrestic after the fire) in order to make amends and see how things are doing there. Of the many times that Andy has described his deep love for Nancy, she always refused somewhat, and he regrets heavily for staying with her for so long. Thus, he decides to move on, leaving Nancy for good. In the series finale, Andy returns for Stevie's bar mitzvah; he has started his own restaurant and now has a 3-year-old daughter.

=== Silas Botwin ===
Silas Andrew Botwin (Hunter Parrish, leading character)—adopting the clandestine alias Mike T. Newman in season six and the stage name Silas Guinard in season seven—is Nancy's first son. Although Silas is the biological son of Lars Guinard, Silas was raised by Judah and Nancy in Agrestic for 16 years. Judah's death traumatized Silas, and he takes it out on his mother and younger brother. Silas is impetuous and impulsive, and has been sexually active since the beginning of the show. Although he operates as though he knows everything, he is often naïve; however, he does show some sense, especially when selling marijuana for his mother, which he is rather good at doing. In season six, when the family briefly splits up to sell drugs, Silas and Shane go to a children's concert to sell hash to the parents attending the show; Silas teaches Shane a valuable lesson about not trusting people and making sure you are responsible for your actions.

After encountering numerous challenges with girlfriends—including a deaf girl he dated named Megan who had an abortion—and the realities of the drug business, he decides that he wants in on the action without his mother looking over his shoulder constantly. He pursues plant cultivation and eventually goes into business with Doug, opening a medicinal marijuana dispensary in the middle of the show. However, he learns that the police are corrupt and take bribes; he also learns not to trust anyone, as one of his employees turns out to be a federal undercover agent.

During season six, he attends college and realizes how enjoyable it is; he becomes furious at Nancy for ruining his chance to stay. Later in Dearborn, he meets his biological father—after realizing he had one other than Judah—Lars Guinard. He tries to stay with Lars in Dearborn, but ultimately decides to go to Copenhagen with the rest of his family.

In Copenhagen, he starts modeling under the name Silas Guinard. He returns to the United States with Andy, Doug, and Shane to find Nancy. He tries to start his modeling career in New York City, and finds that the other models are heavily involved in the pot-dealing business; he sees this as a chance to restart his old ways. He then discreetly sets up a business in Andy's bike shop which is later taken down by rival pot-dealing group, Pouncy House. He has a short affair with the group leader Emma, and then strays off much later until after Nancy's gunshot incident. In season eight, he and Nancy go into a pharmaceutical company and start working for them, but later move onto a southern plantation that willingly could provide more income. The idea of legal marijuana later sparks up in the south and the decision is made legal, leading the corporation and Silas' family to become overly rich. During the time in between, Silas randomly meets Megan working at a museum. The two have a conversation discussing old times, and Silas admits that he had poked holes in the condoms he used while having sex with her to get her pregnant. They eventually make up for Silas' deep affection towards her; in the series finale, it is revealed that Silas and Megan have gotten married. They both have a daughter, Flora.

=== Shane Botwin ===
Shane Gregory Botwin (Alexander Gould, leading character)—adopting the clandestine alias Shawn Newman in season six—is Nancy and Judah's only biological son, and was with Judah at the time of his death. Highly intelligent and poorly socialized, Shane's grief and desperation for a sense of assurance manifests itself in bizarre ways: he talks to his father like an imaginary friend and develops an obsession with Pittsburgh, Pennsylvania, repeatedly asking his mother to move the family there. Called "Strange Botwin" by his fellow students, he is tormented at his public school, and is the frequent target of bullies. At home, he is neglected by his family because of their drug businesses, which makes him develop a psychosis.

Shane's behavior grows more sociopathic and becomes more independent after the move to Ren Mar. He frequently uses alcohol and other intoxicants, engages in casual sex and sells his brother's medicinal marijuana at a local skatepark. He also becomes increasingly violent and develops a disregard for rules, laws, and other social conventions. During the season five finale, Shane overhears Pilar's threat to have his family assassinated and promptly murders her with a croquet mallet. Following the incident, Shane demonstrates a complete lack of remorse, justifying his action as an inevitable necessity. His transformation reflects Nancy's absence as a proper mother to her children due to the family's dire financial situation. Shane gains Ignacio's respect by acknowledging that he would kill the hitman with no remorse to protect his family. He is viewed by Ignacio as a kindred spirit of sorts.

In season seven, after fleeing from Dearborn, he became a puppeteer in Copenhagen with his girlfriend. They later break up. He returns to the United States to find Nancy; while in New York City, he befriends an NYPD officer, Ouelette. During season eight, Shane joins the police force and, along the way, meets fellow cadet Angela; they begin dating. As time progresses, Ouelette's negative influence of alcoholism and prostitutes gets to Shane, and he then starts taking up the same life path. In the series finale, Nancy, having grown exceedingly concerned for Shane, suggests he take up rehabilitation. The future of his cadet girlfriend, Angela, is left unknown.

=== Stevie Ray Botwin ===
Stevie Ray Botwin (regular character, portrayed by identical twins Wyatt Wolf and Jake (Lincoln) Wolf in seasons 5–6, portrayed by Ethan and Gavin Kent in season 7–8)—given the clandestine alias Avi Newman by his mother in season six—is the third son to Nancy Botwin and first son to Esteban Reyes. Under pressure from Pilar, Esteban temporarily disowns his child to protect his political image. Andy, under pressure from Nancy, agrees to be the child's adoptive father. Following Jewish customs, the child is given a bris during which he is named Stevie Ray Botwin. After Nancy and Esteban reconcile, Andy signs a release to legally alter Stevie's birth certificate as a wedding present.

Stevie lives with his biological father and mother until Nancy flees Ren Mar with her other sons. While the Botwins live on the lam, Stevie is cared for by his older brother Shane when not with Nancy. Early in season six, Esteban dispatches Cesar and Ignacio to "find his son"; however, the goons allow Nancy to escape. Late in season six, at the Detroit airport, Nancy uses "Plan C" to arrange for herself, Stevie, Guillermo and Esteban (who had kidnapped Nancy at a hotel room in Dearborn) to be arrested by the FBI.

Jill agrees to raise Stevie while Nancy is in jail. After being disconnected from his mother for three years, Stevie views Nancy as his aunt and Jill as his mother. Jill asks Nancy for permanent custody of Stevie which she immediately refuses. Both Nancy and Jill compromise and move in together to raise Stevie.

In the series finale, Stevie at age 13, portrayed by Mateus Ward, is bar mitzvahed.

=== Jill Price-Grey ===
Jill Price-Grey (Jennifer Jason Leigh, guest character in seasons 5–6, regular character in seasons 7–8) is Nancy's older estranged sister. She has been jealous of Nancy all throughout her life, from dating the teacher she had a crush on to living a life of thrill and excitement. Nancy was absent from her family for an extended amount of time when she was an adult, leaving Jill to care for their parents and ultimately manage both of their funerals. She became a suburban housewife and mother of two. She was constantly dissatisfied with her marriage, and as a result sleeps with Andy in the fifth season. In the sixth season, she briefly appears, now a divorcee and taking up sculpting. She returned for a major role in the seventh season, revealed to be taking care of Stevie for three years while Nancy is imprisoned. She has gotten back together with her husband Scott, although she constantly doubts why. She plans to gain full custody of Stevie, which Nancy tries to stop. The two ultimately settle their differences about the baby and move in together to raise Stevie. In season eight, Jill reveals she is pregnant after sleeping with Andy and Doug. Upon realizing she is not pregnant but is going through menopause, she tells Andy, but he breaks up with her. Jill and Nancy finally talk about each other's mother qualities and agree with each other; Jill decides to leave, but both sisters bond after selling together at a college. In the series finale, Nancy mentions that she lives in India.

=== Shayla and Taylor Grey ===
Shayla and Taylor Grey (Rachel and Amanda Pace) are the preteen daughters of Jill Price-Grey and Scott Grey and Nancy Botwin's nieces. Shayla has a gothic look while Taylor has a straight-laced look. They are twins; the first and only children to Jill and Scott Grey.

== Botwin relatives ==
=== Judah Botwin ===
Judah Botwin (Jeffrey Dean Morgan, minor character in season 1) is Nancy's first husband, the biological father of Shane and brother of Andy, and was presumed to also be the father of Silas until Silas and Shane met Lars Guinard in season six. Judah dies of a heart attack weeks before the pilot episode. Although only seen in flashbacks and home videos, his memory plays an important role in the series.

Nancy met Judah Botwin while the latter was an avant-garde performance artist. Although his performance art attracts her and wins her love, he switches to study engineering so they can settle into a typical middle-class lifestyle. The sixth season establishes that Judah designed rollercoasters for a living. Approximately ten years after Shane's birth, Judah dies of a heart attack. Nancy's grieving for her husband's death is a significant theme in season one. She eventually recovers after she accepts her role as a drug dealer and starts to develop other relationships in her life.

Andy and Silas grieve Judah's death in the first season but appear to recover with time. Andy deals with the loss by stepping up to support the family. Silas acts up from time to time during season one; particularly, he punches Shane in the face after Shane loses a brass cigarette lighter given to him by Judah. Shane has the largest issues regarding Judah's death. At the beginning of the series, he has to see a grief counselor to help him deal with the loss. Various people, including counselors at his school, attribute his anti-social behavior to his father's death.

=== Lenny Botwin ===
Lenny Botwin (Albert Brooks, recurring in season 4), the father of Judah and Andy, lives in Ren Mar. He provided long-term care to his incapacitated mother (Bubbie, portrayed by Jo Farkas) until she asked to be killed. He is on bad terms with Andy, whom he blames for losing a "sure-bet" on a horse-race, and with Nancy, because he wished that Judah had married another woman who became a doctor. However, he is on somewhat good terms with Shane, with whom he first discusses the need to terminate Bubbie's life support. Lenny extorts Nancy for money when he discovers she is a weed dealer; however, he allows her use of his house. He leaves to join the world poker tour midway through season four. In the series finale, it is revealed that he died.

== Doug Wilson's family ==
=== Doug Wilson ===
Doug Wilson (Kevin Nealon, leading character)—adopting the clandestine alias Ted Newman in season six and nicknamed "Rocket Man" by his college buddy Whit Tillerman—is Nancy's fun-loving but irresponsible friend who is a heavy weed user. Doug begins the series as an accountant and city councilman for Agrestic. When Andy moves into the Botwin house, they quickly bond over their mutual love of smoking pot. He is also friends with Dean Hodes, another pot user and poker buddy. Doug has a wife named Dana whom he loves very much but who will not have sex with him.

Throughout season one, Doug helps Nancy establish her pot growing and sales operation. He provides her with an initial client base, sets up the sham bakery through which she launders money, and provides general financial advice. Although his behavior is very immature, Nancy tolerates it so they can maintain a working relationship. When Nancy establishes the grow house, Doug helps with the operation.

Doug's life unravels during the second and third seasons. Although very popular in the Agrestic community and a shoo-in for re-election, he loses his seat to Celia when Dean forgets to file his ballot petition. Doug and Celia have an affair that leads to a divorce from Dana. He loses exclusive golf-club memberships due to the machinations of Sullivan Groff. When he fraudulently borrows a large sum of money from an Agrestic financial account, he feels forced to flee Agrestic/Majestic and follow Nancy to Ren Mar to avoid criminal prosecution. It is implied that he loses his CPA license.

Once in Ren Mar, Doug spends most of his time lamenting the privileged life that he lost. Doug rescues a Mexican "mermaid" that he falls for but loses her when she falls for Andy. Doug eventually opens a medical marijuana dispensary with Silas, but that dream dies when Celia and Dean steal their supply. After Celia pushes Dean out of her pot-selling operation, Doug teams up with Dean and Isabelle to steal it back. He ends season five by becoming co-team leader of Celia's pot-selling team.

In season six, he is abducted by Cesar and Ignacio and taken to Seattle. Cesar almost kills him, but Doug is miraculously saved. Knowing that he owes Dana thousands of dollars in child-support, he leaves with Nancy to live off-the-grid. When Nancy and her brood elect to leave the country, Doug returns to California to obtain his passport from Dana. Upon returning to his family, Doug determines that God saved him so that he could permanently reunite with them. However, he ultimately chooses to join Andy, Silas, and Shane in Copenhagen.

Doug moves to New York City with his adoptive family when Nancy leaves prison. After arriving, he lands a job as chief accountant at Vehement Capital Partners, a Ponzi scheme posing as a New York hedge fund. He suspects that he was hired solely for his softball pitching ability. To that end, Doug starts using anabolic steroids; the drug eventually induces side-effects including "roid rage". Doug hires Nancy as his personal assistant so that she can try to regain full custody of Stevie. It also provides Nancy with an opening to be a SEC informant against Vehement's CEO, Foster Cline.

Thanks to his synesthesia, Doug discovers accounting fraud at his new company, but his old college buddy encourages him to overlook them. Doug also discovers that the SEC retirement plan is tied into Vehement's Ponzi scheme and uses that knowledge to squash the SEC's investigation into the company. When Cline escapes New York City to dodge the SEC, Doug takes it upon himself to find new clients for Vehement to fleece. When that fails, he convinces Tillerman to partner with Nancy's drug dealing operation.

During season eight, Doug lives with Jill, Andy, and the rest of Nancy's family. He has a one-night stand with Jill during her breakup with Andy. During this time, his previous funding business scam is discovered, leading to decline all of his monetary accounts. He then decides to open a makeshift homeless shelter, which will later go onto as a sham religious cult, making him Guru Doug. This gives him mass wealth and allows him to engage in having sex with many women and ingesting many pot products. In the series finale, Doug makes amends with his gay son, Josh, that he had kicked out at a young age for coming out as gay.

=== Dana Wilson ===
Dana Wilson (Judith Hoag, Season 6 Episode 12) is Doug's unseen wife during the early seasons. Dana and Doug were high school sweethearts who were married for 25 years. They are depicted as generally having a good fit. They had a lot of sex early in their marriage; however, Dana later refuses to have sex with Doug because she "has a short cervix and may be a lesbian." The lack of sex creates a significant amount of resentment on Doug's part. During a fight with Dean, Doug divulges that he had to coax and trick Dana into having their children. After Dean informs Dana of Doug's affair with Celia, Dana ends their marriage.

After divorcing Doug, she marries Wilfred (Beau Billingslea), a highly accomplished African-American man who designs symphony halls for a living. They establish a new household in Regrestic, CA, which replaced the burned-down town of Agrestic/Majestic. She has returned to being a housewife. Wilfred owns a boat, the Ms. Daisy, which he and Dana sail on from time to time. While living in New York City, Doug stalks Dana online and stores pictures of her in a folder titled, "My Bitch Ex-wife."

In the series finale, Doug states that he has made amends with Dana and has paid alimony for the divorce.

=== Wilson children ===
Josh Wilson (Justin Chatwin, minor character in season 1 and 8) is Doug's oldest child and only son. He sells pot to small children against Nancy's orders. When she learns that Josh has sex with other men, Nancy threatens to tell Doug about Josh's sexual orientation if Josh continues to deal against her orders. In the series finale, Doug has him kidnapped from his Brooklyn apartment in order to reconnect and make up after having thrown him out. It is revealed that Josh is now a lawyer, having married a painter, Alan Spiller (Jake Sandvig).

Julie (Marielle Carrera, Season 1 Episode 6) was a participant in Shane's terrorist video from season one.

Jesse (Ava Acres, Season 6 Episode 12) is reunited with Doug at the end of season six, but she does not recognize him.

Jennifer has not been seen on screen.

== Celia Hodes's family ==
=== Celia Hodes ===
Celia Hodes (Elizabeth Perkins, leading character in seasons 1–5) is a typical housewife living in Agrestic. She is obsessed with her personal image and alternatively manipulates or ignores those around her that do not fit neatly into that image. She is wholly self-centered, viewing almost all behavior on the parts of other characters as directly related or reactive to her, and displays behavior more consistent with a spoiled, mentally defective child than an adult. She also undertakes disloyal, subversive actions against others, ostensibly to teach them lessons. This takes a significant strain on her interpersonal relationships and causes many of them to sour.

Celia is Nancy's neighbor in the first three seasons. They start as friends during the first season (during which Celia is otherwise socially isolated, due to both her general abrasiveness and her breast cancer diagnosis), but Celia puts upon Nancy in extreme ways. Notably, Celia asks Nancy to have an affair with her to retaliate against Dean's infidelities. She also pressures Nancy to work on her campaign against Doug Wilson and eventually starts a fight with Nancy that ends her friendship. Celia has an affair with Doug, which ends her marriage to Dean. In the beginning of season three, Celia discovers a large quantity of Nancy's MILF weed that she ruins by dumping it into the pool. Celia asks Nancy to thank her for the favor; however, under U-Turn's crosshairs, Nancy lashes out at her. Nancy even threatens to kill her when she breaks into the Botwins' home.

Celia and Nancy mend fences when Celia allows Heylia's grow house to move into her house. When it is discovered by the DEA, she is pressured to travel to Ren Mar to serve as an informant against Nancy. Nancy ends up helping Celia be free of the DEA. Nancy also allows Celia to live at the house in Ren Mar and work at the sham maternity store at the USA-Mexico border. However, Celia begins a cocaine addiction and goes to rehab. Later, she sees her oldest daughter Quinn in Mexico, where she is held for ransom.

In the fifth season, Celia leaves Mexico after nobody offers to pay her ransom. Returning to Ren Mar, she moves back in with Nancy. She ends up selling You're Pretty cosmetics and begins a lesbian attraction to her boss, Raylene. She ends up selling pot and emulating Nancy. After the fifth season, Celia's story is unknown and unfinished. Her story arc concludes with her forming a team with Doug, Dean, Isabelle, Sanjay, and Ignacio to sell marijuana.

=== Dean Hodes ===
Dean Hodes (Andy Milder, regular character in season 3, guest character in seasons 1–2 and 4–7) is Isabelle and Quinn's father and Celia's husband; in the first season, he is also Nancy's lawyer and Doug's poker buddy. Dean loves Isabelle, but has a constantly antagonistic relationship with Celia, which eventually leads to a divorce. Dean keeps a close friendship with Doug, in spite of Doug having slept with Celia. In season five, he performs a legal service for Silas and Doug. In season seven, it is revealed that Dean is living with Heylia to provide legal advice.

=== Isabelle Hodes ===
Isabelle Hodes (Allie Grant, regular character in seasons 3–5, guest character in seasons 1–2) is Celia and Dean's younger daughter, who frustrates her mother with her open homosexuality. Celia is also frustrated with her daughter's unwillingness to lose weight; that frustration peaks when Isabelle becomes an advertising model for Huskaroo's, a clothing line for overweight and obese girls. Isabelle becomes close friends with Shane, who bond over their abnormal mothers; their relationship ends when Shane moves "off the grid" during season six. Isabelle resents her mother, but seems to enjoy her father's company. In the series finale, Dean reveals that Isabelle has had gender affirming surgery and is now living as Bruce.

=== Quinn Hodes ===
Quinn Hodes (Haley Hudson, guest character in season one, four, and five) is Celia's older daughter and Silas's first known girlfriend. Celia sends her to a reform school in Mexico after Quinn tricks Celia into watching a video recording of Dean having sex with Helen Chin. The recording was made using a nanny camera that Celia uses to spy on her children.

In season four, following her intervention, Celia travels to Mexico to apologize to Quinn. However, Quinn kidnaps Celia and holds her for ransom. Quinn's anger toward her mother is so intense that she almost kills Celia to sell her organs on the black market. Fortunately for Celia, her cancer therapy makes her a poor source for organ harvesting; Quinn's frustrations boil over upon learning that her mother is not good for even basic ransom, as no one wants Celia back.

== Heylia James's family ==
=== Heylia James ===
Heylia Turner James (Tonye Patano, leading character in seasons 1–3, guest season 7) is Conrad's aunt and supplier for Nancy. She has a very practical, no-nonsense approach to life and weed dealing. When Nancy complains that Heylia's policies are unfair, Heylia asserts that, "Fare is what you pay to ride the bus." While Heylia becomes impressed with Nancy's ability to sell pot, Heylia also becomes irritated with the novice mistakes Nancy makes and concludes that Nancy is growing too fast for her own good.

After Conrad attacks a college security guard who "jacked" Nancy's weed, Heylia orders him to stay away from Nancy, believing that his feelings for Nancy "brought out the stupid in him" and threaten Heylia's interests. When Conrad goes against Heylia's instructions and starts growing MILF weed with Nancy, Heylia forms a grudge against her. This grudge becomes worse when Nancy's DEA "husband" attempts to bust her sales business. In retaliation, she helps Kashishian ruin the drug deal that ends season two.

After buying Conrad's freedom from U-Turn, Heylia starts her own grow house for Conrad's MILF weed. She and Nancy eventually become reluctant partners when a surprise inspection almost closes the grow house down. At the end of season three, Heylia decides to give up growing pot to open a "compassionate care" club.

In season seven, Heylia is growing MILF weed in rural California when Nancy attempts to obtain pot from her; Heylia greets Nancy by aiming a shotgun at her, still holding animosity towards Nancy. During their meeting, Heylia accuses Nancy of dispersing her family to the winds; "I had a full dinner table before you showed up." She also predicts that Nancy will meet a bad end and encourages Nancy to leave her family for their own good. After an argument among the four of them, Heylia agrees to supply Nancy with weed if Silas lives with her and tends to the MILF weed crop.

=== Conrad Shepard ===
Conrad Shepard (Romany Malco, leading character in seasons 1–3, guest season 8) is Nancy's initial supplier, under supervision of his aunt, Heylia. Nancy met him years earlier through Andy. Although Conrad is very knowledgeable about the intricacies of marijuana cultivation, Heylia has never allowed him to grow plants, insisting that they keep their business small. Despite this, he had worked on developing his own signature genetic blend. He becomes Nancy's business associate using this strain, and it is revealed that he has held very strong feelings for Nancy for a long time. He and Nancy have a brief relationship which ends abruptly after the Agrestic fire in season three. He establishes contact with Silas while the latter is in Copenhagen. In season seven, Heylia tells Nancy that he is living in Los Angeles. In season eight, Conrad returns when Nancy tracks him down to get ahold of seeds or cuttings of their weed strain. She finds him living in Agrestic (which has been re-titled to Regrestic following the fire), where he is about to get married and is making organic health food products. After Nancy asks him to join her new pot growing operation, Conrad turns her down at first, but soon comes around after saving Nancy during a meeting with Guillermo. The Botwin family later attends Conrad's wedding reception.

=== Vaneeta James ===
Vaneeta James (Indigo, regular character in seasons 1–3) is a daughter and employee of Heylia James. She gives birth to Heylia's grandchild in season one and alerts Heylia to a drop-off in their business during season two. She also helps with the operation of Heylia's grow house in season three.

=== Keeyon James ===
Keeyon James (Tyrone Mitchell, minor character in season 1, 3) is Heylia's son. He only appears in three episodes.

== Peter Scottson's family ==
=== Lieutenant Peter Scottson ===
Peter Scottson (Martin Donovan, special guest character in season 1, leading character in season 2) is Nancy's second husband. He was married to Valerie, but divorced her when she cheated on him. Peter and Valerie have a son named Tim whom they share custody.

Nancy and Peter met at a karate tournament where Shane bites Tim's foot. Although they took to each other immediately, Nancy has many problems committing to their relationship. At first, she is unable to move past Judah's death. Later, she discovers that Peter is employed as a DEA agent. Peter wins her trust via crooked dealing including an off-the-radar marriage and selectively busting rival pot growers.

The relationship starts to sour when Peter believes Nancy and Conrad have a romantic relationship; Nancy and Conrad were only platonic at that time. When Peter tells Nancy that he plans to bust and arrest Heylia, Nancy tips off Heylia and ruins Peter's operation which sours their relationship even more. Peter also has a rocky relationship with Nancy's children; he grabs Silas's arm when the latter is insolent at the dinner table. This does not sit well with Nancy, and Conrad convinces her to dump Peter after the current crop of MILF weed is harvested. After discovering Nancy's deception and betrayal, Peter demands that he receive the proceeds from a forced sale of Nancy's pot crop. During the attempted sale, the Armenian drug cartel acts on a deal with Conrad and murders Peter in return for the money Peter would have gotten from the forced sale of Nancy's pot crop, as well as retribution for having their boss arrested.

In season three, it's revealed that Peter and Agent "Fundis" Fundislavsky had run an illegal operation of unknown design. Due to the fact that Nancy and Peter were married at the time of his death, Nancy receives a $119,000 life insurance benefit.

=== Tim Scottson ===
Tim Scottson (Daryl Sabara, guest character in seasons 1–3, 8) is Peter Scottson's son. He was bitten by Shane during a karate match because Shane thought he was physically overmatched by him. Tim has an extreme anger management problem and is openly hostile to Valerie, Shane, and Nancy in particular. Tim returns as the sniper who shot Nancy at the end of season seven, as revealed in the first episode of season eight. In the series finale, after a ten-year jump, Nancy has forgiven Tim, who is now her personal assistant.

=== Valerie Scottson ===
Valerie Scottson (Brooke Smith, special guest character in season 3) is a radiologic technologist and Peter's ex-wife. She is a single mother who struggles to stay afloat financially while simultaneously dealing with Tim's anger management problems. Following Peter's funeral, Nancy follows Valerie to the clinic where she works in an attempt to reach out to someone who knows Peter. Although Valerie initially thinks Nancy is stalking her, she eventually comes to like and befriend Nancy. Upon discovering that Nancy has received the benefit on Peter's life insurance money, Valerie demands that Nancy pay her the money, believing she is truly entitled to it. Despite the fact that Nancy is legally entitled to the money, Nancy promises to give the money despite using most of it to pay back Doug. Becoming impatient, Valerie hires a private investigator to spy on Nancy. After the investigator finds out Nancy is a drug dealer, he blackmails her for $50,000, and Nancy is forced to pay it. Ultimately, Valerie is unable to receive the life insurance money as a result of her own distrust and impatience.

== Esteban and his associates ==
=== Esteban Carlos Reyes ===
Esteban Reyes (Demián Bichir, leading character in seasons 4–5, guest character in season 6) is the mayor of Tijuana in Baja California, Mexico. He is also the leader of the Tres Seis organized crime cartel. He becomes Nancy's third husband and the father of her third child, Stevie Ray Reyes.

He is the child of a rich family living in Mexico City; he moved to Tijuana in 1995 and was elected mayor in 2004. During season four, he is previously divorced and has three female children: Adelita, Amelia, and Seville. Nancy meets Esteban after walking through the tunnel between the US and Mexico. In response, Esteban has Nancy kidnapped to give her a lecture and warns her not to walk through the tunnel. Guillermo refuses to sell pot to Nancy to fund the remodeling of the Ren Mar house, so she appeals to Esteban directly. When Guillermo declares his desire to have her killed, Esteban squashes the order.

Esteban dates Nancy, and their relationship becomes physical and marked by kinky sexual activities; he eventually declares his love for her. When Nancy starts suffering a series of headaches from job-related stress, he encourages her to take a hit of ayahuasca, a brew which has powerful psychedelic effects "to unwind the knot in her soul." (At the time, Nancy was suffering with the moral guilt of managing the tunnel's drug front.) Esteban uses ayahuasca for medicinal purposes, and claims that using it has the effect of sitting for years of psychotherapy sessions all at once.

As their relationship grows, Nancy and Esteban discuss the morality of Esteban's profession. Esteban justifies the killings and the drug trafficking by building schools and hospitals. After witnessing Guillermo traffic child prostitutes through the tunnel, Nancy replies: "It's not enough." She successfully uses her influence to stop the child smuggling only after she tells Roy Till about the tunnel. After a DEA raid on the tunnel, Esteban learns of Nancy's betrayal and orders her to his office for execution. Fortunately, Nancy is able to present evidence that she carries Esteban's first son. After test results ordered by Esteban prove her correct, he spares her life and marries her.

Their relationship is complicated by Pilar Zuazo, who pushes Esteban to disown his son. This leaves Andy to become a father-figure to another of Nancy's children. Esteban resents Andy's "fatherhood" and Andy's choice to raise Stevie in the Jewish tradition; Esteban is Catholic and wants Stevie to be baptized. However, when Esteban and Nancy ultimately marry, Andy steps aside and allows Esteban to assume legal custody of Stevie. After Pilar has Esteban arrested; Andy, Cesar, and Nancy have to secure his release.

After Shane kills Pilar, Nancy abruptly separates from Esteban. He orders Cesar and Ignacio to find Nancy and her family and to bring Stevie back to Mexico. Although Nancy successfully escapes Cesar and Ignacio in Seattle, Esteban eventually catches up with her in Michigan. He and Guillermo take her hostage and briefly reclaim Stevie. After expressing their intent to kill her, they are confronted by the FBI just as they exit the airport, with Nancy confessing to Pilar's murder to save herself and protect Shane.

Nancy provides the FBI information that leads to Esteban's conviction on a long list of criminal charges. Within three years, he is murdered while serving his sentence. His murder triggers Nancy's release from prison.

=== Cesar de la Cruz ===
Cesar de la Cruz (Enrique Castillo, leading character in seasons 4–5, regular character in season 6) is Esteban's lieutenant within the crime cartel. Although very loyal to Esteban, it is revealed that he has alternative loyalties as well. As a part of Esteban's operation, he runs an auto repair shop that specializes in the repair of broken tail lights. When Shane was shot after an assassination attempt on Nancy, it was revealed that Cesar served as an army nurse, something he shows he is embarrassed by later on when he asks Shane not to tell anyone. Esteban assigned Cesar to pursue the Botwins after Shane killed Pilar. After Nancy shoots him in the leg with a crossbow, Cesar retires to live with his family.

=== Guillermo García Gómez ===
Guillermo García Gómez (Guillermo Díaz, regular character in season 4, guest character in seasons 3, 5, 6, & 8) is introduced to Nancy while he is running Esteban's operations in Los Angeles.

Guillermo first meets Nancy while running an errand for U-Turn. At the end of season three, Nancy purchases protection against a rival pot distributor from Guillermo. This results in the wildfire that destroys Majestic. He then offers Nancy a job trafficking drugs into San Diego. Guillermo shows a sexual interest in Nancy; however, she blocks him by telling him that she is a lesbian and that Celia is her girlfriend.

Their relationship sours when Guillermo is ordered to give Nancy a cut of his pot shipments, and he then orders that Nancy be executed. Esteban squashes the execution order. After Guillermo is arrested during the raid of Esteban's tunnel under the USA/Mexico border, their relationship turns downright nasty. When he discovers that Nancy carries Esteban's child but does not have an engagement ring, he gloats that Nancy is about to be killed "like a whore who ends up in a landfill."

At the end of season five, Nancy arranges for him to be transferred to Mexico from the US prison system. This allows him to escape from prison as part of a plot to kill Pilar. After he escapes, Nancy learns that he works for Pilar, not Esteban. At the end of season six, he helps Esteban track Nancy to Michigan. He goes with Esteban and Nancy to the airport where they retrieve Esteban's son Stevie. As the four go to leave the airport he tells Nancy that he plans to kill her "gangland style." However, the FBI is waiting for them outside. The season ends with himself, Esteban and Nancy about to be taken into custody.

In season eight, it is revealed that he was released just as Nancy was. The two of them make amends, and go into business with Conrad. After the ten-year jump, it is revealed he has ten children. He also tells Stevie about the whole entire story about his biological father, Esteban, and the dangerous business he was involved in with Nancy that ultimately led to his death.

=== Ignacio Morero, Jr. ===
Ignacio Morero Jr. (Hemky Madera, regular character in seasons 4–6) is Esteban's finest hit-man, often paired with Cesar. He is introduced while watching over the US end of the tunnel to keep Nancy from going through it. While standing guard, he introduces Celia to cocaine to which she becomes addicted. He was in the maternity store during the DEA raid but was captured on the Mexican side of the border. He later escaped.

In season five, he serves as Nancy's bodyguard for Esteban and eventually becomes quite friendly with the Botwins. Still, due to his love of violence, sociopathic personality, and loyalty to Esteban, his presence remains an everlasting threat towards the family. He also introduces Shane to violent crime. He attends Esteban and Nancy's wedding in a gaudy tuxedo.

He joined Celia's pot selling team at the end of season five; however, he was ordered to help Cesar pursue the Botwins early in season six. After Cesar and Ignacio finally catch up with Nancy and Shane, Ignacio ultimately decides to allow the Botwin family to escape Esteban's grasp. Ignacio and Shane part on good terms, and each respects the other's willingness and ability to kill to protect their interests. In exchange for allowing them to flee, the Botwins give him a car belonging to Kimmy, a girlfriend of Silas. In the series finale, it is revealed that he has started a cosplay company.

=== Sucio ===
Sucio (Ramón Franco, recurring season 4, guest season 5) is one of Esteban's hired goons that digs out the US/Mexico tunnel. He also helps Cesar torture Agent Schlatter. While assigned by Esteban to guard Nancy, he is killed by Captain Till after Nancy orders him to take a shower. Till leaves Sucio's body in a broken freezer in the garage at the Ren Mar house; Esteban arranges for the body to be destroyed by being dissolved in acid.

=== Pilar Zuazo ===
Pilar Zuazo (Kate del Castillo, regular character in season 5, guest season 6) is a politically powerful woman who is allied with Esteban and requires him to do her bidding. She knows the skeletons in Esteban's closet, and each is "documented and photographed." She has a strong dislike of Nancy and affirms that Stevie could ruin Esteban's political career in Mexico's racially charged political environment. Initially, Pilar succeeds in separating Esteban and Nancy. However, when he dates a woman hand-selected by Pilar, his desire for Nancy prompts him to return to her.

When they reunite, Pilar orders a hit man to kill Nancy, which ends up hitting Shane in the arm accidentally. This prompts Nancy to ask Guillermo to kill Pilar in exchange for his freedom. After Pilar has Esteban temporarily arrested, Nancy's desire to have Pilar killed reaches fever pitch. At the end of season five, Pilar makes Nancy an overt threat against Silas and Shane. Shane overhears this threat and kills her with a croquet mallet without remorse.

=== Adelita Reyes ===
Adelita Reyes (Seychelle Gabriel, guest character in season 5) is one of Esteban's daughters. Like her two sisters, she was sent to Paris for prep school. She returns home sometime after her half-brother's birth. She shows modest hostility toward Nancy. Silas tried to seduce Adelita, but she sees him as lacking sufficient sophistication for her tastes. Esteban tells Nancy that Adelita is outside of Silas's league. Adelita invites Silas and Shane to a party where she smokes heroin; when two Mexican boys in which she attends school with, attempt to date rape her, Shane threatens them with a knife. During the season finale, it is revealed that she is a heroin addict, and Nancy arranges for her to enter therapy.

== Other supporting characters in Agrestic ==
=== Lupita ===
Lupita (Renée Victor, regular character in seasons 1–2, guest character in seasons 3–6) served as the Botwins' housekeeper in their days at Agrestic. Eventually, she discovers that Nancy is a pot dealer and uses this information as blackmail against Nancy so she does not have to work as much. In season three, she is eventually fired by Nancy, who is experiencing money troubles. In season four, Lupita moves to Hollywood to work for Mr. Kaplin, a movie executive. During this time, Nancy recruits Lupita to sells drugs to Kaplin's associates.

In season five, Nancy hires Lupita to be Stevie's baby caretaker. Lupita develops a fondness for Stevie as well; "We both have that fiery Latin thing." When Nancy moves into Esteban's house, Lupita moves with her. Under pressure from Esteban, she stops feeding Nancy's breast milk to Stevie and starts feeding him baby formula. In season six, after Shane kills Pilar, Lupita asks Nancy to drop her off at the bus stop, preferring to start anew rather than go on the lam. In her desire to protect Stevie, she asks Nancy to give the baby to her. Nancy accepts Lupita's resignation, but refuses to give up the baby.

In season eight, Lupita has begun working for Conrad and his new wife; she runs off screaming upon seeing Nancy.

=== Pam Gruber ===
Pam Gruber (Becky Thyre, guest character in seasons 1–4, 8) originated as a minor character and member of the Agrestic PTA Association during the first season. She eventually becomes an on-again-off-again sidekick to Celia, who often shows her dismay directly towards her. Pam helps work for Celia during her city council campaign in season two. She also travels to Ren Mar for Celia's intervention in season four.

=== Megan Graves ===
Megan Graves (Shoshannah Stern, regular character in seasons 1–2, guest season 8) is Silas' first serious girlfriend in seasons one and two. She is a functionally deaf high school girl with a somewhat unfair reputation among the school boys and Agrestic's parents; she is called by Nancy "the blow-job queen of Dewey Street."

Megan meets Silas at a party in an unfinished home in the Agrestic development. Within seconds of meeting her, he asks Megan for a blow-job; she sprays his crotch with blue paint. However, she quickly takes a liking to Silas and agrees to date him. During their relationship, Silas gets along very well with Megan's family—most notably her father, who becomes somewhat of a father figure to him. He spends much time at the Graves's home and confides in them about the difficulties of his family life.

Megan and Silas make an agreement to move to LA together when Megan starts at UCLA. However, those plans are dashed when Megan is accepted to Princeton University. Upset that Megan broke their agreement, Silas complains that he cannot get into Princeton because "I'm not deaf." Insulted, Megan storms out of Silas room. They become estranged until Silas apologizes and promises to make their last months together "really count".

Still unhappy that his relationship will end, Silas tricks Megan into having sex while he is wearing a busted condom. She becomes pregnant, and they decide to keep the baby. However, when Megan tells her parents, they take her to get an abortion. Silas and Megan's relationship ends when Silas attempts to confront Megan at the Graves's house; he and Megan's father have a minor physical altercation. Heartbroken, Silas becomes depressed and withdrawn, resulting in him interfering with Celia's "Drug-free Agrestic" campaign.

In season eight, Megan shows up again when Nancy, Andy and Silas return to Agrestic (which has been renamed Regrestic following the fire). Silas sees Megan working at the Agrestic, Majestic and Regrestic Museum of Art. They catch up with each other on what they have missed; Silas admits to having pierced holes in his condoms while they were together to deliberately get Megan pregnant and stop her from leaving California. After a brief angry reaction from Megan, Silas declares his love for her and tells her that he has never loved anyone else; she agrees and they get back together.

In the series finale, Silas and Megan, now married, have a daughter named Flora. After the ten-year gap, Megan shows a strong dislike towards Nancy for destroying Silas' childhood and tries to keep her daughter away from her.

=== Sanjay Patel ===
Sanjay Patel (Maulik Pancholy, guest character in seasons 1–5, 8) starts the series as a state college student at Valley State. Actively looking for ways to make money, Nancy decides to hire Sanjay as a pot salesman at the college. While dealing, he starts using pot and develops a "puppy love" crush for Nancy. He has a tendency to flee from danger and then apologize later.

In season two, Sanjay "accidentally" burns down the cover bakery so Nancy can collect on the insurance. Nancy uses the fire insurance benefit as seed money to start the grow house. Sanjay continues to work for Nancy in the grow house until it is shut down by U-Turn. He comes out as gay at the beginning of season three; U-Turn, outraged that he is gay, forces him to have sex with Clinique. As a result, Clinique becomes pregnant; Sanjay elects to settle down with her and their son, Jimmy Jam. In season four, Nancy recruits Sanjay and Clinique to sell pot. He is arrested during the DEA raid on the US/Mexico tunnel. The DEA ultimately releases him, and he subsequently joins Celia's pot sales team in season five.

In the series finale, Sanjay has married Clinique (where she serves as his beard) and there are no questions in their marriage. They have continued to raise Jimmy Jam and have several more children.

=== Kat Wheeler ===
Kat (Zooey Deschanel, special guest character in seasons 2 & 3)—a.k.a. Libby Cookstein—is Andy's ex-girlfriend who visits Agrestic to drag him off on a traveling adventure. Kat is a kleptomaniac who has committed multiple felonies with Andy. They had a fun relationship and great sex; however, she stabbed him with an icicle for kicking one of her spirit animals. "It is all fucked up, but it's never boring."

She arrives in Agrestic to obtain a release from Andy to publish her book, Permafuck: A Journal of Spirit Rape, as non-fiction. However, it was only a ruse to convince him to join her on the road. Andy refuses to leave Agrestic because he has committed himself to raising Silas and Shane. Kat, who stole $1.3 million worth of poker chips, is being pursued by the bounty hunter Abumchuck; Kat steals Andy's van and kidnaps Shane during the season two cliffhanger. She abandons Shane to travel with a truck driver shortly thereafter.

=== U-Turn ===
U-Turn a.k.a. Louis Wardell (Page Kennedy, guest character in season 2, regular character in season 3) is a gangster operating in Los Angeles. Early in season two, Conrad turns to him for grow house start up money. He offers the money, but Conrad rejects U-Turn's terms. While investigating the drop-off in her sales, U-Turn informs Heylia that Conrad and Nancy are growing MILF weed. When Peter Scottson turns on Nancy, Conrad approaches U-Turn again in order to make a quick sale. U-Turn uses this as a set-up to steal the weed, but due to unforeseen circumstances (Silas and Celia), the pot is lost. Since Heylia had promised an Armenian gang the weed money in return for killing Scottson, U-Turn pays off the debt, leaving Heylia, Conrad and Nancy under obligation to pay him back.

Although Heylia tries to pay off Conrad's debt, U-Turn insists that Conrad grow MILF weed for him instead. Nancy is forced to work her debt off by making illegal deals. U-turn scares Nancy not only for the debt that she owes him, but also because of the extreme nature of his crimes. While Nancy is willing to grow and sell pot, U-turn sells heroin and casually kills members of rival gangs. He buys a fleet of Prius for his crew because "it real quiet, good for sneaking up on [and shooting at] mother fuckers." After seeing talent within Nancy, he starts grooming her to become his lieutenant and eventual heir. After Conrad shoots Marvin (his underling), U-Turn starts a gang war with Guillermo's crew, but U-Turn is murdered by Marvin before it flares up.

Once Nancy accepts her role as a drug dealer, she obtains a tattoo depicting a U-turn sign in his memory.

=== Marvin ===
Marvin (Fatso-Fasano regular character in season 3; guest character in seasons 2, 4 & 8) is U-Turn's modestly incompetent foot-soldier. While holding Nancy hostage in the season three premiere, he makes small talk with her. Conrad shoots him in the buttocks during season three to start a gang war between U-Turn and Guillermo's crews. After years of maltreatment, he kills U-Turn to assume leadership of the operation. Marvin quickly suffers a humbling defeat at the hands of Guillermo. The defeat ruins Marvin's "street cred," ends the U-Turn/Guillermo gang war, and forces him to release Conrad and Nancy from his debt. Marvin is later seen working in Celia's grow house and selling pot for Nancy. He eventually moves to Oakland to put distance between himself and Guillermo. He appears at Nancy's party in the series finale.

=== Clinique ===
Clinique (Julanne Chidi Hill guest character in seasons 3, 4, & 8) is a prostitute who works for U-Turn. While U-Turn is holding Conrad and Sanjay hostage at the grow house, U-Turn calls Clinique over and orders her to have sex with Sanjay in an attempt to "fuck the gay out of him" after Sanjay comes out of the closet. Sanjay is left horrified after having sex with Clinique. During U-Turn's funeral, Clinique reveals that she is pregnant with Sanjay's baby, and decides not to give it up. In season four, Sanjay and Clinique's baby has been born and Nancy recruits them both to work at her fake maternity store that is later shut down by the D.E.A. In the series finale, it is revealed that Sanjay and Clinique have gotten married.

=== Sullivan Groff ===
Sullivan Groff (Matthew Modine, leading character in season 3) is an unethical, womanizing real estate developer who has established multiple Christian-themed planned communities anchored with a megachurch. He bribes the Agrestic city-council to install a sewer-line to facilitate the growth of nearby Majestic, CA. Unfortunately, he makes an enemy of Doug Wilson when the latter discovers that Celia got a more valuable bribe than him. Doug then executes a series of juvenile pranks culminating with stealing a large Christian Cross from Majestic's megachurch and destroying a sewer line. When the other Agrestic council members learn that Celia got a house from Groff, they refuse Majestic's request to build a sewer line under their town.

Groff and Celia have a love affair after her divorce from Dean is finalized. Between their love affair and his need to bribe her, he gives her a house in the Majestic development. Groff helps Celia overcome her self-consciousness regarding her reconstructed breasts. Celia becomes a key ally in dealing with Agrestic and helps him win a referendum that allows Majestic to take over Agrestic. Groff has affairs with both Celia and Nancy, who he had hired to be his secretary. When Celia discovers Nancy's affair, Celia goes through his office destroying furniture.

At the end of the season, Groff reveals that he is a pot user and has a distaste for the religious nature of the communities he develops. Groff implicates Celia when Captain Till questions him over Nancy's grow house. He decides to leave Majestic to establish another community in Colorado Springs.

=== Tara Lindman ===
Tara Lindman (Mary-Kate Olsen, special guest character in season 3) is a Majestic resident who becomes Silas' third known girlfriend. Although she is a Christian fundamentalist, she rationalizes her marijuana usage by concluding that it is God's natural creation. In the wake of Megan's abortion, Nancy objects to the relationship until Tara pledges to retain her virginity by engaging in other sexual practices like outercourse. When Nancy restarts dealing marijuana, Silas suggests that she employ Tara as a seller. Despite Nancy's initial misgivings, she allows Tara to deal. Silas becomes frustrated with Tara because she dates him for her physical needs but dates other Christian fundamentalists to meet her cultural needs. When Silas asks Nancy to cut Tara out of the pot growing operation, Nancy refuses. Silas ultimately ends the relationship when Tara charges into the burning grow house to save the Majestic cross; he realizes that her Christian fundamentalism is too much for him.

=== Chess ===
Chess (Rod Rowland, recurring character in season 3) is the leader of the motorcycle gang that tried to push Nancy to buy their "ditch weed". Chess attempts to deceive Nancy from time to time, but she sees right through him. When Nancy cannot sell Chess's lousy product, she stops buying it. Chess responds by beating up Silas. After Nancy enters into a partnership with Guillermo for protection, Guillermo burns Chess's grow fields. This is the primary cause of the Majestic wildfire.

=== Captain Roy Till ===
Captain Roy Till (Jack Stehlin, recurring character in seasons 2–5) leads a local DEA field office. He is the boss of Agent Scottson, Agent Fundis, and others. Till investigates into Scottson's and Fundis' illegal dealings; he fires Fundis when Scottson's body is discovered. Till arranges for Nancy to receive Scottson's life insurance benefit and pension in exchange for her silence regarding Scottson. That prevents Till from the professional punishment that he would have suffered if Scottson's illegal dealings had surfaced.

Till eventually finds Nancy's grow house at the end of the third season. He initially arrests Celia after interviewing Doug, Groff, Dean and Sanjay. When he begins to suspect Nancy of drug trafficking with Guillermo, he enlists Celia to spy on both of them. When Celia is accepted into the Botwin's home in Ren Mar, Nancy uses Till's fear of being exposed in relationship to Peter Scottson to force him to let Celia go.

When Nancy can no longer accept her role in the operation of the USA/Mexico tunnel, she turns to Till for help in shutting it down. Later, Till's partner and lover, Agent Schlatter, is mutilated and murdered by Esteban's Tres Seis cartel. Till seeks personal revenge during the fifth season and trails Nancy back to her home in Ren Mar. Till kills Sucio before Ignacio incapacitates and captures Till. Nancy incapacitates Ignacio when he resolves to kill Till in Nancy's bathroom tub. When Ignacio and Till come to, they convince her that she must choose one to kill. To ensure the safety of her unborn child, she hands Till over to Esteban who orders Ignacio to kill Till.

=== Yael Hoffman ===
Yael Hoffman (Meital Dohan; recurring character in season 2, guest character in season 8) is an Admission director of Ha Midrash L'Torah, the rabbinical school that Andy attends. She dismissively rebuffs Andy's initial request for admission; however, she provisionally admits him after reading a moving admission essay that she assigned him to write. Andy's sexual interest in Yael is transparent, and she toys and flirts with Andy. After a special cultural event at the school, she agrees to have sex with him. However, she turns the tables on Andy with a pegging encounter. She angrily dumps Andy when he quits rabbinical school. Andy refers to her as "the one" in both season four and season five. During a visit to Regrestic in the series' penultimate episode, Andy visits Yael, hoping to rekindle their romance. Yael, however, has no memory of ever meeting him.

=== Wilfred ===
Wilfred (Beau Billingslea; guest character in season six) is Dana's husband; Dana married Wilfred after divorcing Doug. He is an African male and is extremely accomplished (architect, chef, friends with actors such as Morgan Freeman and Sidney Portier). When one of Doug's daughters is seen showing extreme fondness for Wilfred, Doug becomes depressed with the thought of being a very unsuccessful father.

== Other supporting characters in Ren Mar ==
=== Lisa Ferris ===
Lisa Ferris (Julie Bowen, recurring character in season four) is Rad's mother and Silas's fourth known girlfriend. She is divorced; she obtained sole custody of Rad and sole ownership of the cheese shop in the divorce agreement. Lisa and Silas meet during the sale of Bubbie's possessions. She takes a sexual interest in Silas, and he makes a successful move upon her after telling her that he is underage. When Silas discovers that Lisa is a pot user, she concocts a plan to use the stench of the cheese shop as a cover for growing MILF weed. Nancy confronts the duo and expresses her displeasure with their relationship and concern that Silas "doesn't know what he's doing" regarding cultivation of the weed. Their relationship sours when Silas declares his love for her, and she declares that their relationship will never be that serious. The relationship ends when Lisa's ex-husband makes a surprise visit to her apartment while she is having sex with Silas.

=== Rad Ferris ===
Rad Ferris (Joey Luthman, recurring character in season four) is a juvenile Ren Mar resident who greets the Botwins when they arrive at Lenny's house. Rad strongly believes that his parents will reunite in the future, and he develops a dislike for Silas when he begins sleeping with Lisa. He helps his father document the affair between Lisa and Silas even though it will further strain the relationship between his parents.

=== Maria ===
Maria (Onahoua Rodriguez, recurring character in season four) is an illegal Mexican immigrant who attempted to cross the US/Mexican border by swimming around the western end of the border fence. Doug falls for her as she is arrested by an immigration officer and gives her the nickname "Mermex." Doug smuggles her into the country as part of Andy's coyote operation. Unfortunately, Doug's aggressive sexual overtures, boorish personality, hatred for his ex-wife, and admission that he embezzled money turns Maria off. When Doug learns that she fell for Andy, he reports her to the INS himself.

=== Harmony and Simone ===
Harmony and Simone (Hannah Marks and Jillian Rose Reed respectively, recurring characters in season four and guest characters in season five) are two teenage girls that become sexually involved with Shane after he assaults the most popular boy at the school. They are part of the Goth subculture. Shane loses his virginity to them, and they give him an STD. They help Shane sell marijuana at the end of season four.

=== Dr. Audra Kitson ===
Dr. Audra Kitson (Alanis Morissette, special guest character in season five and guest character in season six) is an OBGYN and abortion provider who delivers Nancy's baby. Andy convinces Audra to date him after Stevie's birth, but Audra dismisses him as an under-achieving 30-something. However, she maintains ties with the family to witness the drama between Esteban and Nancy. She later repairs Shane's bullet wound and tends to Adelita. Ultimately, Audra falls to Andy's charms and then agrees to marry him. She rejects Andy when it becomes clear he still has deep feelings for Nancy and for leaving her alone with Gayle when he confronts her with a crossbow. She resents Nancy for using Andy as her "little puppy dog." In season six, she is seen being questioned by the F.B.I. about the Botwins. She breaks down in tears, heartbroken over Andy abandoning her.

=== Gayle ===
Gayle (Matt Peters, guest character in seasons 5 & 6) is an anti-abortion activist with a deep and disturbed attraction to Audra. He takes Audra hostage as part of the season five cliffhanger. He is subdued by Andy and Nancy when the latter asks Audra for her minivan.

== Other supporting characters in Dearborn, MI ==
=== Vaughn Coleman ===
Vaughn Coleman (Eric Lange, guest character in season six) is a reporter for the San Diego Union-Tribune (within the show's universe) posing as one of Nancy's former classmates, Ellis Tate. He is researching Pilar's death and develops a significant back file on the Botwins while tracking Nancy to Dearborn, MI. After he correctly deduces that Shane killed Pilar, Nancy makes a deal with Coleman to sell her story for a fee. Nancy is initially very evasive during the interview. For example, she tells Coleman that Esteban is bisexual and took a male lover, which is not true. She also destroys Coleman's high-end camera. However, in serious need of money, Nancy ultimately tells Coleman the real story of Pilar's death. Nancy also tells him that curiosity drove her to walk through Esteban's drug tunnel. After the interview, Coleman tells Nancy that she and her family will always be on the run until someone accounts for Pilar's death. Esteban later kidnaps and kills Coleman to lay a trap to capture Nancy.

=== Hooman Jaka ===
Jaka (Assaf Cohen, recurring season 6) owns a bar named the Sand Storm in Dearborn. Nancy sells him a supply of drink made by Andy containing alcohol, hashish, Red Bull, and Ritalin. Jaka names it the "leg-spreader" because of its effect as an aphrodisiac. Jaka is a Shi'ite. (See Daoud Mahmud) While hiding from Mahmud in Schiff's house, he discovers that was admitted to college earlier in life. Unfortunately, the acceptance letter was one of thousands not delivered by Schiff.

=== Daoud Mahmud ===
Mahmud (David Diaan, recurring season 6) is a Sunni Muslim whose daughter is set to marry Jaka. Deeply upset at her daughter's choice to marry a Shi'ite, he asks Andy to kill Jaka in order to obtain fake passports that the Botwins need to flee to Copenhagen. Andy and Jaka attempt to stage Jaka's death so that Andy can get his passports while sparing Jaka's life. Just after Andy's attempt fails, Daoud's daughter discovers Daoud's hatred of Jaka and spurns her father. Daoud's wife sells the passports to Andy for a reduced fee.

=== Warren Schiff ===
Warren Schiff (Richard Dreyfuss, recurring in season six) is Nancy's high school mathematics teacher to whom Nancy lost her virginity. Jill and Nancy likely fought for his attention, and Jill resents Nancy because Nancy won. Schiff is obsessed with Nancy and mailed her notes "from the loony bin." His affair with her cost him his wife and his teaching job. After leaving the mental hospital, Warren becomes a mailman who habitually stockpiles his deliveries in his house. He is elated when Nancy returns to Dearborn and prepares to renew their relationship. When Shane tells him that the family is leaving the country, Schiff initially threatens to kill himself. Later, he steals money from a post office to obtain tickets for himself and the Botwins. Just before their plane departs, he is arrested. As the police take him away, Schiff tells Nancy that he stole the money because he loves her very much.

== Other supporting characters in New York City ==
=== Foster "Chuck" Cline ===
Cline (Aidan Quinn, special guest character season seven) is CEO of Vehement Capital Partners. He is under investigation by the Securities and Exchange Commission who suspects that Vehement is a Ponzi scheme. After Doug hires Nancy as his assistant, Cline hits on Nancy for a date. After Nancy exposes the office pot dealer, Cline changes his mind.

Nancy later becomes an SEC informant and dates Cline to pump him for incriminating information. The next day, Nancy tells Cline of the SEC investigation and her role in it. He initially kicks her out the door but later offers to take her to an exclusive/private island to hide. Nancy's maternal instinct kicks in and she refuses. He leaves her the keys to his New York City townhouse that Nancy later burns down to frame Zoya.

After Cline leaves Vehement, Tillerman informs Doug that Cline was Vehement's "money man," the person who recruited new investors into Vehement to maintain the Ponzi scheme. Doug then resolves to find the needed money himself. Eventually, Cline is discovered in Bali and publicly reveals that Vehement is a Ponzi scheme.

=== Emma Karlin ===
Emma Karlin (Michelle Trachtenberg, special guest character, season seven) runs the Pouncy House Party Rental, the Botwin's principal rival operation. Most of the members of Emma's operation are graduate school students at Columbia University.

When Emma first meets Silas, she poses as an employee for her brother Denny. She takes a liking to Silas, they go out on a date, and Silas offers her a job. After touring Silas's office, Emma and her goons loot Silas's office and turns Andy's office up-side-down by bolting the bicycles to the ceiling. However, Emma realizes that the Botwins sell a superior product so she agrees to a partnership where Pouncy House distributes the Botwins' product.

When Emma and Silas present the partnership idea to Nancy, Nancy refuses because she knows the NYPD has an impending raid on Pouncy House. Emma breaks the deal and storms off. Hours later, she is arrested during the raid. Her arrest triggers her expulsion from law school. After the raid, Emma offers her customer base to him for a 20% cut. Silas tells Emma about how Nancy played Ouellette; Emma then shares that information to obtain a lighter sentence.

=== Kiku Logan ===
Kiku (Kat Foster, recurring character seasons seven and eight) She is a talent scout and agent at Logan Modeling Agency who takes Silas as a client. She is reluctant to do so because Silas is older and less hunky than most New York models; however, she secures him a one-time gig as an underwear model. After Silas quits modeling, he turns to her for hunky messengers to sell MILF weed. In addition to her taking a cut of the sales, she orders him to lose a boxing match in which she has bet heavily. Silas knocks out his opponent, but she is so impressed with him that she seals the deal anyway. She alienates Silas when she tells him "what I do when I tie people up naked in bed." She later supplies Nancy with A-list female models for Nancy's operation with Vehement. In season eight, she is still working with Nancy, but she eventually quits the business, telling Nancy "before I started dealing, my life was better."

=== Detective Mitch Ouellette ===
Ouellette (Michael Harney, recurring character seasons seven and eight) is a member of the NYPD and an adjunct professor at NY City College. Shane impresses Ouellette with his observational skills and ability to "work the system." Over beers, Shane tells Ouellette his history of growing up as Nancy's son and the death of her three husbands.

Shane accepts an internship with Ouellette to be Nancy's man inside the NYPD. Shane prints up a file of information on Pouncy House which gives Nancy a competitive advantage over her rival. After Ouellette discovers that Shane stole that information from the NYPD computer system, he arrests Shane. When Nancy learns that Shane has been arrested, she tells Ouellette that Silas and Shane are caught up in the Pouncy House operation. Ouellette agrees to bust Pouncy House so Silas and Shane can get a second chance to live legitimate lives. However, Nancy lied to Ouellette so she could use the NYPD as muscle against Pouncy House. When Ouellette realizes that Nancy played him, he confronts Shane and tells Shane that he intends to bring Nancy down. Shane tries to appease Ouellette by entering the NYPD academy.

Ouellette drinks Listerine, which contains ethanol, as an alternative to traditional alcoholic drinks because he is in Alcoholics Anonymous. He has a step son named Billy, who runs track and has a shot at winning a college scholarship. The detective loves his step son, but they have a rocky relationship. Shane advises Ouellette to "be there for [your son] when he needs you ... preferably not smelling of beer and mouthwash." Shane bribes and threatens Billy to reconcile with Ouellette because Shane missed out on having a loving father.

=== Zoya Ravitch ===
Zoya (Olga Sosnovska, recurring character season seven) is Nancy's girlfriend in prison. They were cellmates at the time of Nancy's release. Ravitch gave Nancy a pair of oven mitts, the first clue in a scavenger hunt that leads to a cache of weapons. She is serving a long prison term for burning her boyfriend alive. However, she is released midway through season seven after making her own deal with the Feds.

After leaving prison, she reunites with Nancy, but it is initially unclear if Nancy really wants to be with Zoya on the outside. After Zoya interferes with and tries to steal from both Andy's and Silas's operations, Nancy burns down Clive's townhouse to scare Zoya out of the city. (Clive had already left for a private island.) Zoya leaves for Burlington, VT to open a world class hotel for dogs. Nancy promises to move to Burlington later without Andy.

=== Demetri Ravitch ===
"The Sarge" (Pablo Schreiber, recurring character season seven) is Zoya's brother. Formerly an army soldier, he makes a living trafficking consumer electronics and antiques. Zoya stole a cache of weapons from him before she went to prison. In exchange for returning the weapons, the Sarge agrees to supply Nancy with high quality marijuana for resale. Although he often buys pot for personal use, he did not resell it wholesale until meeting Nancy. Nancy and he have an affair that Zoya discovers after she is released from prison.

When Nancy and Silas set up separate marijuana operations, the Sarge has his army buddies jack a pot shipment from Dean and Heylia to Silas. Nancy did not want that to happen and tries to make things right with Silas. When Nancy and Jill make one last visit to Demetri's apartment, they discover that he has been arrested and thrown into the brig. However, Nancy and Jill recover the stolen pot and return most of it to Heylia. After Demetri is released, he agrees to supply Kiku when she and Nancy go looking for him but there is one condition; Nancy doesn't get his heart this time.

=== Whit Tillerman ===
Tillerman (Bruce Nozick, recurring character, season seven) is a senior fund manager at Vehement Capital Partners. He and Doug were close friends while they were in college. When Doug returns to the US, Whit hires Doug to fill an empty senior accountant's slot at Vehement. When Doug discovers irregularities in Vehement's accounting reports, Tillermen encourages Doug to overlook them. However, when Clive leaves the country, Tillerman turns to Doug for money to keep the business afloat. Doug eventually convinces Tillerman to start dealing marijuana to keep the books balanced.

=== Charles and Maxeen Vanderlest ===
Charles and Maxeen (David Clennon and Lindsay Sloane respectively, both recurring characters, season seven) are in a 16-year-long polyamorous marriage. He is a retired English professor suffering with terminal pancreatic cancer. She is an artist who hires Silas for an underwear modeling gig.

Andy meets Maxeen at Silas's performance art show. When Andy saves Silas from suffocation, Maxeen falls for him. Andy and Maxeen have a sexual fling; however, Andy breaks off the relationship after witnessing Charles suffer a hypoglycemic attack.

Charles inspires Andy to make a bold move with his life. To that end, Andy elects to start selling the Copenhagen bicycle wheel in New York. After Charles dies, Andy discovers that Maxeen is pregnant by "someone named Landy" and has set up an unusual household arrangement. This inspires Andy to set up an unusual family arrangement himself, remaining oblivious to the fact he is likely the father of her child.

== Minor characters ==
=== Other law enforcement characters ===
Actor	Role	Seasons	Notes
Todd Stashwick	Cash	1 & 3	The head of security at Valley State Community College, the school where Nancy starts dealing during the first season. Because Cash is a dealer himself, he steals Nancy's supply of pot and pressures her to stay out of his territory. After Conrad and his friends rough him up, Cash returns the pot and allows Nancy to deal on campus. During season three, Nancy initially tries to sell Cash a large quantity of pot to pay off U-Turn, but she abandons the sale upon realizing Agent Fundis has her under surveillance.
Shawn Michael Patrick	Agent George "Fundis" Fundislavsky	2–3	Agent Scottson's partner within the DEA. He has a severe esophageal dysfunction which causes him to constantly burp. After Scottson's death, he launches a solo investigation of Nancy Botwin that makes it difficult to move U-Turn's product. After Peter's body is discovered, Fundis is implicated in a corruption probe that leads to his ouster from the DEA.
Andrew Rothenberg	Agent Phil Schlatter	4	Roy Till's partner at the DEA and Till's life partner. Cesar discovers Schlatter's role in the closing of the USA/Mexico tunnel and captures him. After extensive torturing, Schlatter reveals that Nancy Botwin was the DEA's informant. Cesar shoots him dead immediately thereafter and hangs his body on the U.S./Mexico border fence.
Larry Joe Campbell	Deputy C.P. Jones	5	A corrupt police officer in Ren Mar who extorts Silas and Doug when they are running the pot store. Jones generates significant trouble for Doug and Silas with his immature behavior. He also hangs out around the store in his police uniform, thereby scaring away customers. However, he does introduce Silas to the Wizard who agrees to supply him with pot products. Jones is arrested after an investigation by Ren Mar PD internal affairs.
Jonathan Blitt	Frank Caldarone	5	An internal affairs officer who works at Silas's pot club in Ren Mar while investigating C. P. Jones.
John Fleck	Agent Lipschitz	6–7	The lead agent investigating Pilar's death. (The FBI has jurisdiction because she was killed on US soil.) After Nancy surrenders herself, she gives Lipschitz copious information about the Tres Seis cartel. That information leads to Esteban's conviction on multiple charges and the collapse of Tres Seis. In exchange for making his career, Lipschitz arranges for Nancy's early release from prison.
Debra Mooney	Director Shelby Keene	7	The director and warden of Stability House, Nancy's half-way house in New York City. She is also a drug abuse councilor. Keene descended from Native American stock and actively embraces that culture. She often wears Native garb. She has a harsh and hostile personality and lashes out at Councilor Ed (due to his drinking). Kenne initially takes a positive view of Nancy, but ultimately concludes that she will meet a bad end.
Gary Anthony Williams	Counselor Edward "Ed" Watson	7	Works at the half-way house where Nancy resides. A middle-aged, obese, African-American man, Doug mistakes Ed for Marvin (from season three) and tells Ed that Nancy is a drug dealer.
Seth Isler	Agent Melnick	7	Running the SEC investigation against Vehement Capital Partners. His employees offer Nancy freedom from the half-way house in exchange for serving as an informant against Clive. However, a botched wiretap yields no information on Clive and exposes Silas' pot dealing operation. Just as Melnick is about to turn Nancy over to the DEA, Doug arrives and informs him that the solvency of the government's pension plan is dependent upon Vehement's success. Melnick then gives Nancy the incriminating recording and releases Doug and Nancy.
Brendan Ford	Agent Colm Mulcahey	7	Works for the SEC. He was a part of the team investigating Vehement Capital Partners. He is a pot user.
Karen Strassman	Agent Jolene Waite	7	Works for the SEC. After Doug uses his leverage over the SEC to end their investigation of Vehement, Waite visits Vehement to investigate their own pension account. She also demands that the SEC's account be separated form Vehement's larger Ponzi scheme. She discovers that Clive, the CEO who fled the US, took a large chunk of money with him. Doug later has sex with her to keep her from discovering Vehement's new marijuana operation.
Andy Umberger	Judge Franklin	7	A family court judge in Alameda County, California who presides over Stevie's custody case between Jill and Nancy. When Nancy flies to Oakland for the first hearing, Jill's lawyer convinces the judge to grant a continuance. The postponement infuriates Nancy (as intended by Jill's lawyer), but Silas convinces the judge to give Nancy a private audience. The judge encourages Nancy to seek the help of those who helped he raise Silas. Upon receiving several good reports on Nancy's progress, he calls her to tell her that she will likely win full-custody.

=== Other recurring characters ===
Actor	Role	Seasons	Notes
Tressa DiFiglia	Maggie	1	A recurring PTA member in season one. She attempts and fails to unseat Celia as PTA chairwoman after Celia's cancer diagnosis. Her home is annexed into the nearby city of Summer Canyon at the end of the season one.
Vincent Laresca	Alejandro	1–2	Rival pot dealer in Agrestic with whom Nancy has a brief sexual encounter. At first, he tries to intimidate Nancy to leave the drug business, but he later aligns himself with her to sell Conrad's MILF weed. He leaves Nancy's operation when he gets called in to play with the Toronto Blue Jays.
David Doty	Mr. Dodge	1–2	The principal at Agrestic Elementary. Shane often makes trouble for Dodge, which makes him "best friends" with Nancy.
Bruce Thomas	Howard Graves	1–2	Megan's father, whom Silas grows a close relationship with in season one. He ends up punching Silas after Megan terminates her relationship with Silas.
Eden Sher	Gretchen	2	Shane's first girlfriend at Agrestic Elementary School. She is impressed when Shane stands up to Celia during an anti-drug lecture at school. However, she becomes jealous of Shane's friendship with Kat, and her relationship with Shane ends when Kat kidnaps him.
Ron Canada	Joseph	2	Suitor of Heylia James. His membership in the Nation of Islam is a sore point with Vaneeta. Joseph provides protection to Heylia during an anticipated raid by Peter Scottson. Joseph and Heylia part on friendly terms when they realize her business dealings and his faith are incompatible.
Arthur Darbinyan	Aram Kashishian	2	Leader of the Armenian drug cartel rivaling U-Turn's gang and the Conrad/Nancy MILF weed operation. When Nancy sets up the grow house in Kashishian's neighborhood, Kashishian threatens to shut Nancy down. Nancy asks Peter for help, and Peter organizes a bust of Kashishian's operation in which Kashishian is arrested. After Peter's botched bust of Heylia's house, Heylia reaches out to Kashishian to exact revenge upon Nancy. This leads to Peter's death and Conrad and Nancy being held hostage.
Robert "Bonecrusher" Mukes	Abumchuck	2–3	Alaskan bounty hunter who follows Kat to Agrestic. He helps Andy pursue Shane, whom Kat kidnapped. When they reach the roadside diner where Kat and Shane separated, Abumchuck abandons Andy.
Sprague Grayden	Denise	3	Female member of a biker gang that tries to sell "skank weed" to Nancy. Denise seduces Andy to lure Nancy into Chess's operation.
Sharon Sachs	Eve Meriweather	3	Upstanding citizen of Majestic. She leads the charge into the burning grow house holding the Majestic cross.
Don Perry	Mr. Mertes	3	Majestic resident who lives at the community's senior citizen center. He is a heavy pot user.
Lisa Darr	Ann Carilli	3–4	Head of the Majestic city council who investigates Doug's embezzlement of funds during season three. She confronts Doug one last time before he flees to Ren Mar.
Richard Azurdia	Davenport	4	An illegal Mexican immigrant who crossed the US/Mexican border with El Coyote. He helped Andy and Doug establish their coyote business. His real name is not established in any episode. He is given the nickname "Davenport" because of his desire to resettle in Davenport.
Emilio Rivera	El Coyote	4	A smuggler of illegal Mexican immigrants across the US/Mexican border. Andy follows him away from the border fence after Nancy strands him there. Andy is outraged by the inhumane way El Coyote treats his customers and later shoots him in the knee cap. After El Andy becomes famous, El Coyote confronts him to take revenge, but a group of Mexicans stand up to protect him.
Lee Majors	Minute-man leader	4	The character leads the minute-man cell that Doug joins as part of the coyote operation. Doug provides Andy with intelligence on movements of the other cell members so he can cross the border. The leader expels Doug once he discovers the operation. The leader also has a fetish for female body builders who inject male hormones.
Kevin Alejandro	Rudolfo	4–5	Revolutionary leader who kidnaps Celia with help from Quinn. Although Rudolfo genuinely loves Quinn, she treats him badly. After Quinn and Rudolfo cannot get a ransom for Celia and they discover that her organs cannot be sold on the black market, he kicks Quinn out of his life. Celia attempts to convince Rudolfo to allow her to stay with him, but he sends her back to Texas.
Carlos Gómez	Dr. Brisas	5	The Mexican OBGYN that Esteban selects to perform a CVS procedure on Nancy early in season five. Nancy, who is still under the gun after the shutdown of the drug tunnel, compares her treatment at the clinic to being abducted by aliens.
Erin Sanders	Danielle	5	A co-worker of Celia's during the middle of season five. She later buys pot from her. She is a softball player and is attracted to Isabelle.
Stephanie Erb	Margaret	5	She works as a teller at a bank in Ren Mar. When Andy discovers a passbook issued by that bank in Judah's name, Andy encounters her when he presents himself as Judah in an attempt to claim the money in the account. She tells Andy that the only way to gain access to the money is to date her and to make love to her as Judah to satisfy her unrequited desire for Judah.
Jamie Denbo	Raylene	5	Regional sales director for "You're Pretty" make-up. She is a lesbian and claims to be sexually aroused by financial success, leading her to become attracted to Celia once her sales career takes off.
Todd Robert Anderson	Mr. Sundasky	5	Shane's English teacher in Ren Mar. After he steals $4,000 of pot from Shane, Ignacio helps Shane to steal the pot back.
Jamie Renée Smith	Kimmy	6	She is Silas's girlfriend while he is pretending to be a student at a local college in Seattle. They start dating after they compete in a trivia contest. He dumps her after Ignacio steals Kimmy's car.
Aisha Hinds	Latrice	6	She is a house maid and Nancy's hotel co-worker. Latrice is sympathetic to Nancy's plight until she discovers Nancy's hashish operation. She then tries to steal Nancy's money during two confrontations and fails. Latrice has a boyfriend with outstanding arrest warrants.
Linda Hamilton	Linda	6	She is a very eco-conscious hippie who sells pot in Seattle. She lives with her female-partner Fiona (played by Stephanie Beard) and Fiona's son Kish (played by Taaryn Cooper). Although she usually sells pot for personal use, she agrees to supply Nancy with marijuana trimmings that would otherwise be thrown away. Nancy uses the trimmings to make hashish.
Peter Stormare	Chef Wagner	6	He is the hard-nosed boss at the restaurant in the Seattle hotel. While assigned to dish-washing duty, Andy successfully convinces him to grant a promotion to sous chef before Nancy drags Andy out of town.
Alex Schemmer	Denny	7	At the beginning of season seven, he works as a pot messenger to the employees at Vehement. Nancy prints up fliers to out him as a "known drug dealer" open up that territory for her operation. He and his sister Emma later pay Silas a shake down visit where he poses as the head of Pouncy House Party Rental, a rival dealing operation. He is arrested during the raid on Pouncy House.
Martin Short	Steward Havens	7	Nancy's pro bono lawyer in New York City. He derives sexual pleasure from collecting stories of misfortune from his clients. He became very wealthy by suing the makers of faulty silicone breast implants whose patients developed thyroid disease.
