= Rachel and Amanda Pace =

American actresses

- Born: October 6, 2000 (age 25); Brea, California, U.S.
- Occupation: Actresses
- Years active: 2003–present

Rachel and Amanda Pace (identical twins, born October 6, 2000) are American twin actresses. They are mostly known for playing the role of Hope Logan in the soap opera The Bold and the Beautiful and as Nancy Botwin‘s nieces Shayla and Taylor Grey in the TV series Weeds. They are the daughters of Mike, a computer technician, and Jennifer Pace, a personal banking officer. They have an older brother, Matthew.

The girls started making commercials and, when they were 2 years old, were cast in The Young and the Restless as Abby Carlton. A couple of months later, they got their first big role playing Hope Logan in The Bold and the Beautiful, a role they kept from 2004 to 2009.

== Rachel filmography ==
| Year | Film | Role | Notes |
|---|---|---|---|
| 2003 | The Young and the Restless | Abby Carlton | |
| 2004–09 | The Bold and the Beautiful | Hope Logan | |
| 2007 | Private Practice | Kim Merring | |
| 2008 | iCarly | Little Girl | |
| 2009–12 | Weeds | Shayla Grey/Taylor Grey | |
| 2010 | The History of Spaceflight | Blue | |
| 2010 | Private Practice | Niki | |
| 2011 | Elevator | Madeline Barton | |
| 2011 | Ringer | Bridget Kelly (young) | |
| 2011 | Bucket & Skinner's Epic Adventures | | |
| 2014 | Kirstie | Twin #1 | |
| 2014 | Growing Up Fisher | Madison | |
| 2014 | Sofia the First | Princess Lei-Lani (Voice) | |
| 2015 | Fallout 4 | Erin Combes, Julia Thompson, Nina Rodriguez, Brotherhood Squires (Voice) | Video game |
| 2017 | Switched for Christmas | Teen Kate | |

== Amanda filmography ==
| Year | Film | Role | Notes |
|---|---|---|---|
| 2003 | The Young and the Restless | Abby Carlton | |
| 2004–09 | The Bold and the Beautiful | Hope Logan | |
| 2007 | Private Practice | Becky Merring | |
| 2007 | June in Springdale | Clair | |
| 2009–12 | Weeds | Shayla Grey/Taylor Grey | |
| 2010 | The History of Spaceflight | Blue | |
| 2010 | Private Practice | Kelli | |
| 2010 | Important Things with Demetri Martin | Little Girl 2 | |
| 2014 | A Letter to Momo | Momo Miyaura (Voice) | The movie was made in Japan in 2011 and was dubbed in English on 2014 |
| 2011 | Happiness Is a Warm Blanket, Charlie Brown | Sally Brown (Voice) | |
| 2011 | Elevator | Madeline Barton | |
| 2011 | Ringer | Siobhan Kelly (young) | |
| 2011 | Bucket & Skinner's Epic Adventures | | |
| 2014 | Kirstie | Twin #2 | |
| 2017 | Switched for Christmas | Teen Chris | |
