= Michael Trim (television producer) =

Cinematographer, television director and producer

- Born: 1954
- Education: Juniata College
- Occupation(s): Cinematographer; Television director Television producer

Michael Trim is a cinematographer, director, and producer. He worked on the television series, Weeds, Parks and Recreation, and Orange Is the New Black.

In 2010, Trim won a Primetime Emmy Award for Outstanding Cinematography for a Half-Hour Series for episode "A Modest Proposal" of the television series Weeds.

== Early life and education ==
Michael graduated from Juniata College in Huntingdon, Pennsylvania, in 1976, and returned there to speak in 2011. He returned again to deliver the commencement address for the class of 2019 and receive an honorary doctorate for his achievements.

== Career ==
Trim worked as director of photography for:

- 4 episodes of 30 Rock.
- 13 episodes of Cavemen.
- 50 episodes of Weeds.
- 34 episodes of Parks and Recreation.

He has worked in some producer capacity for:

- 36 episodes of Weeds.
- The entire first season of Orange Is the New Black (13 episodes) and part of the second season.

Trim has directed:

- 1 episode of Man Up!.
- 4 episodes of Parks and Recreation.
- 18 episodes of Weeds.
- 7 episodes of Orange Is the New Black.
- 1 episode of 68 Whiskey.

He has also worked in various other capacities, including production assistant, electrician, best boy, gaffer, cinematography. His initial interest in entertainment was in lighting.
