= Weeds season 3 =

Weeds
- Season 3
- DVD cover
- No. of episodes: 15

Release
- Original network: Showtime
- Original release: August 13 – November 19, 2007

Season chronology
- ← Previous; Season 2 Next → Season 4

The third season of Weeds premiered on August 13, 2007, and consisted of 15 episodes. Metacritic gives the season a score of 82.

== Plot ==
The season begins with the fallout of the botched drug deal. Celia finds and destroys the entire harvest; U-Turn pays the mobsters to leave Nancy and him alone; Silas is arrested and sentenced to community service; Sanjay comes out of the closet, but U-Turn forces him to have sex with a woman who becomes pregnant with his child.

During the first half of the season, Nancy works to pay off her debt to U-Turn, owed because U-Turn saved her life, and because of Celia destroying the harvest. Nancy also gets a legitimate job working for Sullivan Groff, a crooked developer from the neighboring community of Majestic, and soon pursues a sexual affair with him. Celia, who has also been intimate with Groff, resents Nancy for this.

Nancy wants to get back into the business, and Doug "borrows" $50,000 from Agrestic's public treasury so Nancy can buy MILF weed. Silas meets Tara, an evangelical Christian who enjoys smoking pot, and convinces Nancy to let him and Tara join her operation. Nancy turns Silas over to Conrad, so Silas can learn how to grow. Shane and Isabelle become outcasts at the heavily-religious Majestic summer school and form a friendship. As familial stress increases, Shane begins having conversations with his dead father and insists Judah is really there. Nancy is terrified that her arrest is imminent when she is unexpectedly called in by the DEA. It turns out that the DEA has discovered her marriage to Peter, and a hefty life insurance payment awaits.

At U-Turn's behest, Conrad and Heylia start a grow business. U-Turn sees talent in Nancy and trains her to be his lieutenant, while simultaneously starting a war with rival Mexican dealers. When U-Turn has a heart attack while jogging, Marvin suffocates him and becomes the new boss. Marvin then botches an attempted truce with the Mexicans, allowing Nancy to clear all debts for her and Conrad and end the gang war.

Debt-free, but feeling lonely, Nancy befriends Peter's ex-wife, Valerie. The two initially bond over their troubled lives, but the friendship turns sour when Valerie demands Peter's life-insurance money; Valerie feels it is rightfully hers, due to her longer marriage to Peter and the child they had together. Nancy promises to give the money, but first uses it to replace the money Doug took from the Agrestic treasury. Despite receiving several payments, Valerie believes that Nancy will never give her the full amount, and she hires a private investigator to trail Nancy. The investigator discovers Nancy's drug activities and blackmails her for the remainder of the life-insurance money. Nancy pays him and ensures the investigator won't come after her again. Nancy later confronts Valerie and tells her she no longer has any money, thanks to the investigator Valerie hired.

Meanwhile, the nearby community of Majestic has been attempting a hostile takeover of Agrestic, with Doug leading due to the large amount of money it would bring in. But Groff's gift—a new house in Majestic—to Celia leads to jealousy, and Doug begins sabotaging the Majestic city infrastructure. However, it is too late, as Celia puts it to a public referendum. To get back at Groff, Doug steals the giant cross from Majestic's megachurch, eventually putting it inside the grow house. When Heylia and Conrad are forced to move the grow operation, Nancy negotiates the use of Celia's off-the-books house in Majestic. While hanging out at the grow house, Nancy and Conrad begin a sexual relationship, but Conrad realizes he has no future with her. Andy befriends a group of bikers, who want Nancy to start selling their low-quality weed. When Nancy refuses, the bikers threaten her family; Nancy turns to Guillermo—the leader of the Mexican dealers—to get protection. Guillermo decides to burn down the bikers' marijuana field, causing a huge fire which spreads to the Agrestic area. At that time, thermal cameras spot the stolen cross and the DEA moves in.

Nancy takes advantage of the fire, pouring gasoline throughout her house and lighting it with a match, ensuring that she and her family will be leaving and moving on, and that there will be no evidence of their drug activities.

== Cast ==
=== Main cast ===
- Mary-Louise Parker as Nancy Botwin (15 episodes)
- Elizabeth Perkins as Celia Hodes (15 episodes)
- Tonye Patano as Heylia James (12 episodes)
- Romany Malco as Conrad Shepherd (15 episodes)
- Hunter Parrish as Silas Botwin (15 episodes)
- Alexander Gould as Shane Botwin (15 episodes)
- Andy Milder as Dean Hodes (10 episodes)
- Allie Grant as Isabelle Hodes (10 episodes)
- Justin Kirk as Andy Botwin (15 episodes)
- Kevin Nealon as Doug Wilson (15 episodes)

=== Special guest stars ===
- Zooey Deschanel as Kat Wheeler
- Matthew Modine as Sullivan Groff
- Mary-Kate Olsen as Tara Lindman

=== Recurring cast ===
- Indigo as Vaneeta James
- Guillermo Díaz as Guillermo García Gómez
- Renée Victor as Lupita
- Fatso-Fasano as Marvin
- Maulik Pancholy as Sanjay Patel
- Tyrone Mitchell as Keeyon James
- Brooke Smith as Valerie Scottson
- Becky Thyre as Pam Gruber
- Daryl Sabara as Tim Scottson
- Julanne Chidi Hill as Clinique
- Page Kennedy as U-Turn
- Jack Stehlin as Captain Roy Till
- Sprague Grayden as Denise
- Sharon Sachs as Eve Meriweather
- Rick Scarry as Brendan Kelly
- Patricia Harris-Smith as Sarah
- Richard Hilton as Harry
- Sammy Fine as Benj
- Bob Rumnock as Mr. Lippman
- Eric Cadora as Agent Shuman
- Shawn Michael Patrick as Agent Fundis
- Robert Allen Mukes as Abumchuk
- Justin Huen as Rodriguez
- Lisa Darr as Ann Carilli
- Tim Colceri as Sergeant Lewis
- Scott Klace as Paul St. Moritz
- Don Perry as Mr. Mertes
- William Francis McGuire as Desk Cop
- Rod Rowland as Chess
- Randy Thompson as Mitch Kamin
- Rod Britt as Peter Gregory
- Paul F. Tompkins as Bob
- Steven Hack as Brian McNally
- Steve Tom as Col. Kors
- Jessica Jaymes as Jessica
- Giovanni Lopes as Manuel
- Lexington Steele as Lexington

== Episodes ==
| No. overall | No. in season | Title | Directed by | Written by | Theme song performer(s) | Original release date | US viewers (millions) |
|---|---|---|---|---|---|---|---|
| 23 | 1 | "Doing the Backstroke" | Craig Zisk | Jenji Kohan | Randy Newman | August 13, 2007 | 0.82 |
Conrad stays behind while U-Turn releases Nancy under supervision to find the MILF weed. Silas is arrested for stealing surveillance cameras and vandalism to city property. Following Silas' arrest, Celia takes his car and discovers the MILF weed in the trunk. U-Turn makes a deal with the Armenians to split the proceeds of the MILF weed heist equally. As a result, the Armenians leave. Kat abandons Shane in a diner; Shane tries to drive back to Agrestic in Andy's van. After Shane leaves, Andy and Abumchuck arrive at the diner and are able to confirm that Shane was there; Abumchuck then abandons Andy. Andy eventually finds the abandoned van, which is now under an Amber alert. Dean and Doug have a fight that quickly ends when they discover a cache of narcotic drugs that they share. Nancy returns to the house and discovers that Celia has destroyed all of the weed by dumping it in her pool.
| 24 | 2 | "A Pool and His Money" | Craig Zisk | Jenji Kohan | Angelique Kidjo | August 20, 2007 | 0.74 |
U-Turn finds Sanjay, who comes out of the closet, figuratively and literally. U-Turn, outraged that Sanjay is gay, has Clinique "fuck the gay out" of him; she fails. Nancy fails to save the MILF weed after the THC dissolves into the pool water. Nancy desperately turns to Heylia for money. Heylia punches Nancy, then tries to bail out Conrad, but U-Turn turns down Heylia's offer. U-Turn declares that Conrad will grow MILF weed for him and that Nancy still owes him $150,000. After walking through Agrestic drunk, Celia passes out in Dean's house and is found by Isabelle. After recovering the van that is flagged for an Amber alert, Andy is mugged by a gang of vigilantes who mistakenly think he's kidnapped and molested Shane. It is revealed that Shane has been picked up by the police; Nancy is forced to pick up both Silas and Shane at the police station. The episode ends with Nancy jumping into the pot-stained pool and screaming underwater.
| 25 | 3 | "The Brick Dance" | Lev L. Spiro | Roberto Benabib | Kinky | August 27, 2007 | N/A |
To save money, Nancy fires Lupita and mulls selling the Agrestic house. U-Turn sends Nancy to pick up a package from Guillermo, the head of the Mexican gang doing business with U-Turn. Nancy meets with Guillermo, who makes her perform a sexually suggestive "brick dance" before giving her the package. Silas is given a lenient community service sentence for vandalism. To win sole custody of her daughter, Celia tries to make nice with Isabelle. However, Isabelle turns her mother into Child Protective Services due to the unsatisfactory conditions of Celia's hotel room. Dean wins sole custody. Having left rabbinical school, Andy is ordered to fulfill his Army Reserve obligation after being told his missing toes aren't enough to get him discharged. Dana has thrown Doug out of the Wilson house. Agent Fundis, Peter's DEA partner, visits Nancy to talk to her about Peter's disappearance.
| 26 | 4 | "Shit Highway" | Martha Coolidge | Roberto Benabib | Donovan | September 3, 2007 | 0.74 |
After Fundis' visit, Silas and Shane become suspicious of Peter's disappearance. When Agent Fundis begins surveillance on Nancy, Silas insinuates that he will deal pot, and that Nancy is helpless to stop him. Sullivan Groff, a developer from the neighboring city of Majestic, petitions the Agrestic city council to allow Majestic to transport sewage through Agrestic's sewer system. After executing a political power play, Doug regains his seat on the city council. Doug expresses interest in approving Groff's petition, due to the large amount of money it would bring in. With Celia's help, Groff hires Nancy to be his executive assistant. Groff also makes a romantic move on Celia. Heylia and Conrad begin to set up their new grow house. Andy is going through basic training and witnesses Private Rodriguez getting impaled by a tracking drone; Andy flees the scene with a cell phone recording of Rodriguez's death.
| 27 | 5 | "Bill Sussman" | Craig Zisk | Rolin Jones | Billy Bob Thornton | September 10, 2007 | N/A |
Groff bribes the city council to win approval of his sewer scheme; Doug receives a golf membership, while Celia receives a new house. After being threatened by the US Army, Andy returns the recording of Rodriguez's death in exchange for an honorable discharge. Shane attends a Christian-themed summer school in Majestic. Silas does well selling pot, but Nancy still refuses to allow him to make dealing a career. Marvin is shot by Guillermo's gang; Nancy drives Marvin to the doctor while he bleeds over her car's upholstery. Along the way, U-Turn retaliates by committing a drive-by shooting from Nancy's car. It is implied that Conrad was the one who shot Marvin, in order to start a gang war between U-Turn and Guillermo. U-Turn orders Nancy to guard a trunk of heroin stolen from Guillermo.
| 28 | 6 | "Grasshopper" | Perry Lang | Devon K. Shepard | The Shins | September 17, 2007 | N/A |
Nancy hides the trunk of heroin in her house. Groff orders Nancy to throw a party to curry favor with some Agrestic leaders; Nancy orders Andy to cater. Groff takes Celia to the party as his date, and Celia reveals her romantic interest in Groff. When Doug discovers that Celia got a better bribe than him, he prompts wildlife officials to shut down construction of the sewer line. Shane is depressed due to summer school and a lack of maternal attention. While dealing pot at a local retirement home, Silas bonds with Tara, an evangelistic Christian who volunteers at the home. Silas and Tara bond by smoking pot together. U-Turn tells Nancy that he plans to groom her to replace Marvin. U-Turn and Nancy later visit Heylia and Conrad's grow house, and U-Turn teaches Nancy how to threaten one's enemies. Marvin becomes jealous of Nancy and murders U-Turn while he is having a heart attack.
| 29 | 7 | "He Taught Me How To Drive By" | Paul Feig | Matthew Salsberg | The Individuals | September 24, 2007 | 0.64 |
After U-Turn's death, Marvin assumes leadership of U-Turn's operation; Conrad pushes Marvin to directly confront Guillermo. Conrad admits to Nancy that he began the gang war. At the meeting, Guillermo utterly routs Marvin. In exchange for Nancy returning the heroin trunk, Guillermo orders Marvin to release Nancy and Conrad from his debt. Isabelle and Shane stir up trouble at summer school. Nancy meets Tara and instantly approves of her after she declares her pledge to remain abstinent until marriage. Andy begins catering for a pornography set. After Groff fails to convince the city council to approve an Agrestic-Majestic merger, Celia suggests Groff call for a referendum on the issue. Groff assigns Nancy the task of "legalizing" his construction crew and collecting signatures for the referendum. Groff and Nancy start a sexual affair. Peter's body is exposed by a rain storm.
| 30 | 8 | "The Two Mrs. Scottsons" | Craig Zisk | Rolin Jones | Man Man | October 1, 2007 | 0.58 |
After Peter's body is recovered, DEA Captain Roy Till confronts Agent Fundis with a report of his and Peter's criminal activity. Till fires Fundis, and the DEA ultimately covers up the illegal dealings. At Peter's funeral, Nancy sees Peter's ex-wife, Valerie, and starts to stalk her. Nancy has Doug arrange to borrow $50,000 from Agrestic's public treasury so Nancy can buy MILF weed. Heylia and Conrad's grow house begins operations, under the front company of Aquatecture. Heylia agrees to sell to Nancy. Andy dips into the porn industry after finding out that his missing toes are an asset to the dog-eat-dog world of hardcore porn. Celia has sex with Groff, who helps her overcome her self-consciousness relating to her breast removal. Isabelle and Shane become friends and share pot together. Nancy visits Valerie at the radiology clinic where Valerie works. Valerie confronts Nancy: "I know who you are."
| 31 | 9 | "Release the Hounds" | Ernest Dickerson | Blair Singer | Joan Baez | October 8, 2007 | 0.52 |
Valerie and Nancy share an awkward conversation about Peter's death. Valerie is initially hostile to Nancy for stalking her, but they later agree to go out to dinner. Andy questions the wisdom of befriending Valerie. Nancy restarts her pot-dealing operation, and Silas suggests that Nancy allow Tara to sell; Nancy reluctantly agrees, and turns Silas over to Conrad so Silas can learn how to grow pot. Dean is run off a cliff while driving his motorcycle and gets severely injured. Dean is found and taken to the hospital with critical injuries; Celia begrudgingly agrees to help Isabelle with Dean's recovery. In order to pay for Dean's medical bills, Celia wants to sell her house, but Groff reveals that the house is off-the-books. After Majestic annexes Agrestic, Doug finds that his golf membership has been revoked. He retaliates by severely damaging Majestic's sewer pipe during Groff's official annexation ceremony.
| 32 | 10 | "Roy Till Called" | Craig Zisk | Victoria Morrow | The Decemberists | October 15, 2007 | N/A |
Nancy's pot selling proceeds swimmingly, until Captain Till calls Nancy to his office. Although Nancy fears that she is going to be arrested, Till offers her a $119,000 life insurance benefit, plus Peter's pension in exchange for her silence of Peter's illegal dealings. Valerie confronts Nancy over Peter's life insurance benefit and wants Nancy to give it to her. Doug turns to Nancy when Majestic's government arranges to audit Agrestic's books; Nancy uses some of the insurance benefit to replace the money in Agrestic's treasury. Nancy tries to "return" Peter's insurance benefit to Valerie in small installments, but Valerie balks at this. Dean is discharged from the hospital, and Celia is forced to coordinate his care. Nancy confronts Groff and quits her job; shortly after, Celia visits Groff's office and discovers Groff and Nancy having sex.
| 33 | 11 | "Cankles" | Julie Anne Robinson | Christina Kiang Booth | Michael Franti | October 22, 2007 | 0.61 |
Upset that Nancy has not given her the insurance benefit, Valerie hires a private detective to investigate Nancy. Shane detects the PI using their new home surveillance system. The PI, who claims to have documented Nancy's operation, blackmails her for $50,000. Nancy pays the PI, but refuses to give Valerie any more money, claiming she had to use the remainder of her insurance money to pay off the PI. Silas is conflicted when Tara starts dating someone else "for her cultural needs." Doug continues to clash with Majestic, who are suspicious over Doug's loan to Aquatecture. Upon learning of this, Celia investigates into Aquatecture and has a hostile conversation with Heylia. Celia also spots Conrad, and they vaguely acknowledge each other. Celia then tortures Dean for information. Conrad delivers Nancy a message from Celia: "I know you fucked my boyfriend. I know you are dealing again. We'll be in touch."
| 34 | 12 | "The Dark Time" | Ernest Dickerson | Victoria Morrow | Persephone's Bees | October 29, 2007 | 0.69 |
Celia confronts Nancy and threatens to turn her into the police, but Nancy pulls a knife to Celia's throat and threatens to kill her. Shane witnesses this incident and laments that criminality and violence are now a part of their lives. An unexpectedly routine investigation by the fire marshal forces Conrad and Heylia to move the grow house; Nancy makes a deal with Celia to re-establish the grow house in the house Groff gave to Celia. Celia agrees, and they begin to move the MILF plants from the old grow house. Doug plots revenge against Groff and steals a large Christian Cross art piece from the Majestic church. Groff accuses Doug of stealing the cross. Andy takes Dean to a public wheelchair basketball game in order to flirt with Denise, an attendee. Andy befriends Denise's biker gang; Chess, the leader of the gang, invites Nancy to buy pot from him. Conrad and Nancy reunite and have sex.
| 35 | 13 | "Risk" | Paul Feig | Roberto Benabib & Rolin Jones & Matthew Salsberg | Laurie Berkner | November 5, 2007 | N/A |
Since many of the MILF plants died while being transferred to the new grow house, Nancy agrees to buy pot from Chess. Unfortunately, Nancy's customers universally dislike his product. Doug moves the Majestic cross into Nancy's home. When Nancy wants it removed, Doug moves the cross into the grow house. Celia destroys furniture in Groff's office; Groff decides to leave town. Celia expresses interest in joining Nancy's operation. Celia and Heylia reconcile while planting herbs outside the grow house in order to mask the smell of the MILF plants. Silas and Tara reconcile. Nancy gets a tattoo of a U-turn sign, to which Conrad takes offense. When Nancy refuses to buy more pot from the biker gang, Chess has Silas beaten up to threaten the Botwin's. Nancy discovers that Shane has begun speaking to Judah as if he were alive and living in the house.
| 36 | 14 | "Protection" | Randy Zisk | Roberto Benabib | Linkin Park | November 12, 2007 | 0.68 |
Silas goes to the doctor for his injuries, while Andy and Nancy talk with Shane. "Judah" tells Andy that he is disappointed with the job Andy did while playing father. "Judah" tells Nancy that he is angry with her, but still loves her. Nancy suggests that Shane is using the memory of Judah to vent at her. Silas and Andy suggest therapy, but Nancy expresses fears that Shane would reveal her occupation. Celia turns to Heylia for advice regarding drug money. A DEA thermal imaging satellite finds the cross in the grow house. Silas pushes Nancy to strike back at Chess, so Nancy strikes a deal for protection with Guillermo. Nancy admits to Conrad that she is a drug dealer. Conrad and Nancy kiss again. A wildfire starts when Guillermo sets Chess's grow field on fire, leaving the family to wonder if Nancy had anything to do with it.
| 37 | 15 | "Go" | Craig Zisk | Jenji Kohan | Opening: Malvina Reynolds; Closing: Pete Seeger | November 19, 2007 | 0.74 |
Majestic is evacuated. Heylia announces her plans to establish a compassionate cannabis club. Conrad and Silas take MILF weed clones to grow elsewhere. Conrad and Nancy see each other for the last time; Conrad realizes he has no future with Nancy. Shane refuses to leave their house because "Judah" refuses to leave. The police bust the grow house with the Majestic cross and discover the MILF plants. A group of Majestic residents, including Tara, rush headlong into the fire to save the cross. Disturbed by Tara's actions, Silas ends their relationship. The DEA interviews Groff over the MILF plants; Groff implicates Celia. Celia implicates Nancy. Nancy confronts Guillermo, who invites her to traffic pot across the USA/Mexico border. Before driving south, Nancy returns to her house to burn it down herself, ensuring their family will be moving on, and that there will be no evidence of their drug activities. The episode, and third season, ends with a montage of a burning Agrestic/Majestic mirroring the opening credits.
