= Weeds season 4 =

Weeds
- Season 4
- DVD cover
- No. of episodes: 13

Release
- Original network: Showtime
- Original release: June 16 – September 15, 2008

Season chronology
- ← Previous; Season 3 Next → Season 5

On November 5, 2007, Showtime ordered 13 new episodes for a fourth season of Weeds. It started on Monday, June 16, 2008 and concluded on Monday, September 15, 2008.

The season opener "Mother Thinks the Birds Are After Her" was the last episode with "Little Boxes" as the theme song until season eight. The opening credits of subsequent episodes, after a recap of previous episodes, begin with a video title card unique to each episode. Each title card also has a prop or part of the setting that refers to a plot element in the episode.

Silas and Shane are aged 17 and 13 respectively. However, Silas turns 18 at the end of the season.

The song ‘Mexico’ by That Handsome Devil, featured in the seventh episode of season four, has reached 1,000,000 likes on Spotify and has helped the band’s career.

== Plot ==
Having lost both her Agrestic grow house and her residence in fires, Nancy relocates her family to the fictional California town of Ren Mar, near the Tijuana-San Diego border. The Botwin family move in with Andy and Judah's father Lenny (Albert Brooks) in Ren Mar, and Guillermo hires Nancy to smuggle in illegal drugs from Mexico.

Celia is in jail due to being the official lessee of Nancy's grow house, and she bargains to spy on Nancy for the DEA in exchange for her release. Guillermo's men catch Celia spying, but Nancy convinces them to spare Celia's life by claiming she was her partner. Andy enters a coyote partnership with Doug, who has recently moved to Ren Mar to evade questions about Agrestic's finances. Doug falls for an undocumented woman he names "Mermex" after witnessing her unsuccessful attempt to enter the United States. Using his coyote enterprise, Doug locates Mermex and gets her into California; however, Mermex is repelled by Doug's nature and falls in love with Andy. Scorned, Doug turns Mermex in to immigration. Isabelle is unenthusiastic about moving in with Dean in Detroit, and she pesters Celia to let her stay in Ren Mar. Silas sets up a grow room in the rear of a gourmet cheese shop owned by a neighbor, Lisa (Julie Bowen), an attractive woman in her thirties. Despite knowing that Silas is underage, Lisa becomes intimate with him, but reveals to Silas that her interests in him are just financial and physical. Heartbroken, Silas spurns her advances and ends their business relationship. Shane attacks the most popular boy at school without provocation in order to acquire a fearsome reputation. He also attracts the admiring attention of two classmates, Simone and Harmony, with whom he loses his virginity in a threesome. Simone and Harmony later help Shane sell weed at the school.

Guillermo's boss, whose identity is unknown to Nancy, has her open a maternity store. Nancy believes it is solely for money laundering until she finds a tunnel entrance in the back room. Though she is initially told it is for transporting marijuana, Nancy later learns that the tunnel is also used to transport other things, including guns and women. Unable to accept the human trafficking operation, Nancy becomes an informant for DEA Captain Roy Till, even though she has begun a sexual relationship with Guillermo's crime boss, who is revealed as Esteban Reyes (Demián Bichir), the mayor of Tijuana. The resulting DEA raid and shootout ends with most of the Mexican drug runners, including Guillermo, arrested.

While working at Nancy's store, Celia begins abusing the readily-available drugs. Isabelle and Dean stage an intervention, which spurs Celia to enter rehab and make amends to her family. Dean insists that Celia locate and make amends with their oldest daughter, Quinn, who departed during the show's inaugural episode for a Mexican boarding school named Casa Reforma. Newly graduated, Quinn and her boyfriend, Rodolfo, drug Celia and hold her hostage in order to extract a $200,000 ransom.

Following the DEA raid, Esteban's lieutenant, Cesar (Enrique Castillo) obtains a report about the raid from a mole in the DEA. As a result, Till's partner/lover, Agent Schlatter, is brutally tortured and mutilated by Esteban's cartel until he gives up Nancy's name. Upon learning that Nancy had alerted the DEA to his tunnel, Esteban captures Nancy and intends to have her killed. In a final attempt to save her life, Nancy hands Esteban an ultrasound and reveals that she is pregnant with his child.

== Cast ==
=== Main cast ===
- Mary-Louise Parker as Nancy Botwin (13 episodes)
- Elizabeth Perkins as Celia Hodes (13 episodes)
- Hunter Parrish as Silas Botwin (13 episodes)
- Alexander Gould as Shane Botwin (13 episodes)
- Allie Grant as Isabelle Hodes (9 episodes)
- Justin Kirk as Andy Botwin (13 episodes)
- Kevin Nealon as Doug Wilson (13 episodes)

=== Special guest stars ===
- Guillermo Díaz as Guillermo García Gómez
- Albert Brooks as Lenny Botwin
- Demián Bichir as Esteban Reyes
- Julie Bowen as Lisa Ferris

=== Departures ===
Romany Malco, Tonye Patano, and Indigo do not return, with their characters' whereabouts unknown after the fire in Majestic. Patano returns as Heylia for a four-episode arc in season seven, and Malco returns as Conrad for one episode in season eight.

=== Recurring cast ===
- Andy Milder as Dean Hodes
- Jillian Rose Reed as Simone
- Hannah Marks as Harmony
- Maulik Pancholy as Sanjay Patel
- Renée Victor as Lupita
- Fatso-Fasano as Marvin
- Joey Luthman as Rad Ferris
- Haley Hudson as Quinn Hodes
- Becky Thyre as Pam Gruber
- Julanne Chidi Hill as Clinique
- Hemky Madera as Ignacio Morero, Jr.
- Jack Stehlin as Captain Roy Till
- Ramón Franco as Dirty Man
- Paul Alayo as Chewie
- Kevin Alejandro as Rudolpho
- Gloria Garayua as Reyna
- Alejandro Patiño as Alphonso
- Emilio Rivera as El Coyote
- Andrew Rothenberg as DEA Agent Phil Shlatter
- Onahoua Rodriguez as Maria (aka Mermex)
- Richard Azurdia as Davenport
- Lisa Darr as Ann Carilli
- Lee Majors as Minute-Man Leader
- Rigo Sanchez as Mexican Mechanic
- Jo Farkas as Bubbie
- Jessica Chaffin as Cracklynn
- John Lafayette as Downtown Rehab Counselor
- J. Anthony Pena as Guillermo's Henchman
- Greg Pitts as Billy Boesky
- Ivo Nandi as Claudio
- Mario Revolori as Dweeb
- Manuel Urrego as Luis

== Episodes ==
No. overall	No. in season	Title	Directed by	Written by	Intertitle	Original release date	US viewers (millions)
38	1	"Mother Thinks the Birds Are After Her"	Craig Zisk	Jenji Kohan	Video of Majestic burning	June 16, 2008	1.35
After Nancy burns down their house, the Botwins move to Ren Mar, a fictional beachfront town within San Diego. After meeting a neighbor, Rad, they break into Lenny Botwin's house and find his mother Bubbie hooked up to a ventilator. Lenny arrives and starts criticizing Andy and Nancy. When Nancy informs Lenny about the Majestic fire, he begrudgingly allows them to stay. Nancy and Guillermo take a trip to the USA/Mexico border fence. Throughout the episode, Nancy smells of gasoline after burning down the Agrestic house; Nancy finally confesses her actions to the family, but insists that they have to move on. Back in Agrestic, Captain Till interviews Celia about the grow house. When Dean, Doug, and Sanjay are interviewed, they claim Celia was in charge of the drug operation in order to protect Nancy. Till places Celia under arrest and throws her in jail.
39	2	"Lady's a Charm"	Craig Zisk	Victoria Morrow	Mexican border checkpoint	June 23, 2008	1.10
Nancy turns her attention back to business. Guillermo breaks the taillight on Nancy's car and sends her to Mexico to have it repaired at Cesar's garage; he also orders her to buy inhalers from a pharmacy in Tijuana. Excited to go on her first international drug trafficking run, Nancy leaves her passport in Ren Mar. The US border patrol inspects Nancy's car and confiscates the inhalers, but they don't find any other drugs. It is revealed that Nancy had completed a dry run; Cesar did not put drugs in the car, though Guillermo did record Nancy's trip. Doug and Isabelle visit a distraught Celia in jail. Silas grows his strain of MILF weed in Andy's van. Shane tends to Bubbie, who regains consciousness and asks Lenny to kill her. Till sees a picture of Guillermo and Nancy standing together at the border.
40	3	"The Whole Blah Damn Thing"	David Steinberg	Ron Fitzgerald	Medical monitor	June 30, 2008	0.86
Guillermo and Nancy review the film from her trip to Mexico. After giving her some pointers, he sends her back to Mexico on a real drug run, which is successful. Captain Till releases Celia so she can gather information on Guillermo. Celia discovers Nancy has moved to Ren Mar and begins her surveillance. After officials from Majestic confront Doug over his embezzlement from Agrestic's treasury, he flees to Ren Mar as well. The Botwin men discuss the wisdom of euthanizing Bubbie. Eventually, Lenny agrees to have Nancy kill Bubbie by shutting off her ventilator.
41	4	"The Three Coolers"	Paris Barclay	Roberto Benabib	Shiva candle	July 7, 2008	1.06
The Botwins sit shiva for Bubbie. Doug arrives, to Lenny's displeasure. Lenny tries to sell his house, but the house will not fetch the price that Lenny wants. While searching the house, he finds drug money that Nancy has hidden and discovers that Nancy deals marijuana. He lets Nancy rent the house for an exorbitant rent, and leaves Ren Mar to play poker professionally. Doug contemplates his fall from his privileged lifestyle. Andy and Nancy leave for the desert to receive a drug delivery. When the Tres Seis cartel make the delivery, Nancy is forced to leave Andy in the desert. When Nancy doesn't return promptly, Andy walks off with a group of undocumented immigrants. Celia, who proves to be a poor informant, is captured by Guillermo.
42	5	"No Man is Pudding"	Craig Zisk	Rolin Jones	Pudding containers	July 14, 2008	1.00
Nancy, pretending to use Celia as a partner, convinces Guillermo to spare Celia's life. Guillermo makes Nancy the manager of a maternity store along the US/Mexico border. Silas moves his plants into the house, and he and Shane disturb a bee colony in the process. Andy liberates himself and a group of immigrants by shooting their coyote. Over dinner, Nancy acknowledges Andy's contribution to the Botwin family, recognizes that Silas is a pot grower, and apologizes to Shane for ignoring him. She also allows Celia to stay at the Ren Mar house and hires Celia for a minimum-wage job at the maternity store. Nancy uses her knowledge of Peter to convince Till to release Celia from his service. While closing the store one night, Nancy discovers a hole in the floor of the store's backroom. It is revealed that the hole leads to a tunnel under the Mexican border.
43	6	"Excellent Treasures"	Julie Anne Robinson	Jenji Kohan	Flip-flop impression on the sand	July 21, 2008	1.03
Nancy walks through the tunnel, but she is dragged back to the US when Cesar discovers her. The next day, she and Celia discover Ignacio, a Mexican drug-syndicate goon, guarding the tunnel. Shane tries to sell Bubbie's possessions. Rad's mom, Lisa Ferris, meets Silas and takes a liking to him. While at Imperial Beach, Doug meets and takes a liking to Maria, an undocumented immigrant trying to sneak in across the ocean border. However, she is quickly captured by the border patrol. Isabelle moves to Ren Mar with Celia. Nancy is kidnapped and meets Esteban, Guillermo's boss. He gives her a lecture and then flirts with her. Nancy later discovers that Esteban is the mayor of Tijuana.
44	7	"Yes I Can"	Scott Ellis	Matthew Salsberg	Package of prescription pills	July 28, 2008	0.77
Nancy resolves to add a bathroom to Lenny's house and hires Shane as the contractor. She visits potential contacts: Sanjay, Clinique, Lupita, and Marvin, to sell weed. After renewing the contacts in her sales network, she asks Guillermo for a portion of his regular weed shipment, but he rebuffs her. Nancy travels to Cesar's garage to obtain an audience with Esteban. While talking in Esteban's limousine, Nancy directly asks him for a piece of the weed shipment. He lectures her on Tres Seis' chain of command and spanks her. To Guillermo's great displeasure, Esteban allows Nancy to sell a portion of one weed shipment. Isabelle deduces that the maternity store is a drug front. Andy and Doug research the coyote business; Doug signs on with the border patrol militia as a cover. Silas starts an affair with Lisa, despite Silas being underage. Shane discovers nude pictures of a younger Nancy and begins masturbating to them. Captain Till and Agent Schlatter are revealed to be lovers.
45	8	"I Am the Table"	Adam Bernstein	David Holstein & Brendan Kelly	Immigration sign	August 4, 2008	0.94
The house renovation begins. Isabelle and Shane start at a new school. To ward off bullies, Shane makes a pre-emptive strike against a popular boy. Doug keeps the border militia at bay while Andy smuggles his first troop of undocumented immigrants into the country. Unfortunately, Andy forgets to demand payment. After catching Celia sleeping on the job, Ignacio gives her a hit of cocaine to keep her awake; Celia becomes addicted. Esteban calls Guillermo and Nancy to his office for a meeting, after Guillermo issues a death threat against Nancy. After Esteban squashes the order, he takes Nancy out to lunch at a Mexican café. While Nancy is in the restroom, a rival drug cartel fires weapons into the café, causing damage. They discuss the moral ambiguity of Esteban's charitable work in light of his leading a drug cartel. After Nancy visits Esteban's lion, they have blood-drawing sex.
46	9	"Little Boats"	Craig Zisk	Ron Fitzgerald	Mexican hero portraits	August 11, 2008	0.85
Esteban and Nancy have trouble finding time to date. Silas moves his pot plants into the backroom of Lisa's cheese shop. Nancy discovers that Silas is having sex with Lisa. She fears that Silas is not experienced enough to grow pot, and confronts Lisa over her illegal relationship with Silas. When Silas suggests moving in with Lisa, she sends him away to slow things down. Andy discovers that Shane is masturbating to the naked pictures of Nancy. After Nancy is informed, she is forced to talk to Silas and Shane about these developments. Celia's chemical dependency worsens, and she is fired by Nancy for entering the tunnel to find more cocaine. Andy and Doug are set up for El Coyote to kill them, but customers at the bar intervene to save them. Shane becomes the most feared student at school, and he meets Harmony and Simone, two gothic girls from his school. Esteban unexpectedly arrives at Nancy's house to spend the night.
47	10	"The Love Circle Overlap"	Julie Anne Robinson	Victoria Morrow	Condom wrapper	August 18, 2008	0.88
Dean, Isabelle, and Pam host an intervention for Celia. Silas serves as a babysitter for Rad while Lisa and her ex-husband have a custody hearing. Silas accepts that they will never have a serious relationship. Shane loses his virginity by having a threesome with Harmony and Simone. Andy finds Maria in Mexico. When Andy brings her across the border, the militia leader finds them and expels Doug from the ranks. Nancy hires Clinique and Sanjay to replace Celia in the maternity store. Nancy discovers that Guillermo is trafficking women through the tunnel, and starts having a series of migraine headaches. Esteban and Nancy take ayahuasca, a brew with powerful psychedelic effects to help Nancy "unwind the knot in her soul." During her high, Nancy imagines one of the women she saw being smuggled standing in the Pacific Ocean.
48	11	"Head Cheese"	Craig Zisk	Roberto Benabib & Rolin Jones & Matthew Salsberg	Neck and chest tattoos	August 25, 2008	0.82
Celia goes to a suburban therapy clinic; just as she begins to open up emotionally, Celia is booted out for having no health insurance. Doug tries to have sex with Maria, but she insists that he must win her affection. Andy gives him courtship advice; however, Maria is turned off by Doug's boorish personality, hatred for his ex-wife, and money embezzlement. Silas and Lisa start selling pot disguised inside sandwiches. As the business grows, Silas asks Nancy for money to start a grow house. Nancy learns that Shane had sex with Simone and Harmony; she admonishes him for having sex at age 13. Nancy discovers that the tunnel is being used to smuggle heroin and guns. She expresses her reservations about working the tunnel to Esteban, who tries to reassure Nancy that the drug trade is "how I build schools and hospitals." Nancy replies: "It's not enough." Unable to accept the human trafficking operation, Nancy calls Captain Till in order to become an informant for the DEA.
49	12	"Till We Meet Again"	Michael Trim	Roberto Benabib & Rolin Jones & Matthew Salsberg	Electric power-sander	September 8, 2008	0.93
Nancy fills in Till on Esteban's operation. Maria, fed up with Doug and in love with Andy, seduces Andy into having sex with her. As revenge for her actions, Doug calls immigration and gets Maria deported. Agent Schlatter comes to the store with a woman posing as an expecting dad; Nancy secretly informs Schlatter about the room the tunnel is in. Shane steals some of Silas' weed and starts selling it. Celia attempts to make amends with her family; Dean insists that Celia should find their oldest daughter, Quinn, and apologize to her. While Nancy and Esteban are alone together in another area, the DEA raids the maternity store and arrests several of Guillermo's men. Till tells Nancy she will be "arrested" and then let go due to a lack of evidence. She maintains that she doesn't know who Guillermo's boss is. Meanwhile, Cesar states he obtained a report about the raid from a mole in the DEA. With Esteban's blessing, he uses the report to capture Schlatter and brutally torture him until he gives up Nancy's name. Schlatter is then killed by Cesar.
50	13	"If You Work for a Living, Then Why Do You Kill Yourself Working?"	Craig Zisk	Jenji Kohan	Gift basket	September 15, 2008	1.01
It is Silas' eighteenth birthday and Nancy is struggling to keep her involvement in the bust a secret from Esteban. Andy evaluates his relationship with Nancy. Celia, inspired by rehab, travels to Mexico to make amends with Quinn, but she is instead sedated and kidnapped by Quinn in order to extort a $200,000 ransom from Dean. With Dean acting as Nancy's attorney, Nancy's "interrogation" goes according to plan until Till receives news informing him about Schlatter's death. Enraged, Till demands Nancy gives him information on Schlatter's killers so he can get revenge. While driving to Mexico to meet Esteban, Nancy orders a last-minute birthday present for Silas with an emotional message on the package. In Esteban's office, Esteban receives confirmation of Nancy's involvement in the raid. In order to prevent Esteban from killing her, Nancy hands him an ultrasound and reveals that she is pregnant with his child, who she believes is a boy.
