= Weeds season 2 =

Weeds
- Season 2
- DVD cover
- No. of episodes: 12

Release
- Original network: Showtime
- Original release: August 14 – October 30, 2006

Season chronology
- ← Previous; Season 1 Next → Season 3

The second season of Weeds premiered on August 14, 2006, and consisted of 12 episodes.

== Plot ==
The second season, while comedic, has a darker tone, as Nancy becomes increasingly involved in the more dangerous aspects of the drug world. Ignoring Heylia's advice, Nancy and Conrad start their own small-scale growing operation and eventually rent a suburban "grow-house", where they can grow marijuana indoors using artificial light and hydroponics. Peter tells Nancy that he knows she is a drug dealer, but considers her too small-time to be worth busting, and the two get married as part of a deal to legally protect Nancy from Peter testifying in a court of law. Conrad initially threatens to leave the operation after learning of Peter's occupation, but ultimately relents.

While Nancy's drug activities increase, Celia wins Doug's spot on the town council, due to the incompetence of Dean, who forgets to file Doug's paperwork, thus leaving Doug off the ballot. Celia immediately launches a drug-free campaign across Agrestic, putting up drug-free zone signs and surveillance cameras. Doug and Celia share a strong desire for revenge on Dean, which inspires a brief sexual liaison. Doug and Celia eventually plan to leave their spouses; Celia tells Dean, who demands a divorce, but Doug refuses to leave his wife, Dana, ending their affair.

Silas and Megan's relationship threatens to finish once she leaves for college (she, a very serious student, is going to Princeton). Silas attempts to get her pregnant to prevent this, but instead his success leads to her parents forcing her to have an abortion. Silas and Megan's relationship ends when Silas has a violent confrontation with Megan's father. Andy develops a relationship with an attractive, sexually formidable administrator, Yael Hoffman, at his rabbinical school, but they break up once he tells her he is planning to drop out, due to an incident at the grow house where a dog bites off two of his toes; he thinks this will invalidate his military obligation.

Silas and Shane become more aware of Nancy's illegal activities, although they deal with this in different ways. Shane continues to have problems fitting in at school and his friends begin to ridicule him for his sexual inexperience. To resolve the problem, Andy takes him to a massage parlor to get a "happy ending" hand job. Gaining confidence, Shane joins the debate team to get closer to a classmate, Gretchen, who later becomes his girlfriend. However, he breaks up with her because of an infatuation with Andy's estranged ex-girlfriend, Kat. Silas takes out his frustrations through vandalism, most notably by stealing Celia's drug-free zone signs and cameras to help his mother. Meanwhile, Nancy has received threats from Armenian dealers who have local grow houses and see her as encroaching on their territory. Nancy tells Peter, and he has them all arrested.

Nancy and Conrad's drug business does well as Conrad's strain of plant (which Snoop Dogg dubs "MILFweed" during a chance meeting at a recording studio) is popular with customers, and the two begin to get intimate. Meanwhile, Nancy learns from Peter that the DEA is planning to investigate Heylia; Nancy and Peter's relationship deteriorates when she tips off Heylia about the DEA. Following the incident, Heylia and Conrad pressure Nancy into quitting the business and persuading Peter to stop the DEA's investigation. When Peter comes over for dinner and manhandles Silas, a shocked Nancy calls Conrad and tells him that she doesn't love Peter, but will string him along until the current harvest is done; Peter hears the conversation with wireless surveillance.

The season concludes with a complex series of betrayals, as an enraged Peter demands from Nancy and Conrad all of the cash from a quick sale of their crop. Heylia hires Armenian mobsters to kill Peter, as she believes Peter is planning to kill Conrad after the deal. Nancy and Conrad's buyer, U-Turn, demands the entire crop at gunpoint. Under Heylia's orders, the Armenian mobsters kill Peter and arrive following the murder, expecting the proceeds from the big sale to pay for their hit. When they realize that U-Turn plans to steal the weed, they decide to take the weed instead. Nancy then discovers that Silas has stolen the entire batch and will hold it until his mother allows him to join her business. Minutes after hiding the batch in his car trunk, Silas is approached by Celia and a police officer for the theft of the drug-free zone signs and surveillance cameras, because Celia has footage of Silas stealing the last camera. This leaves Nancy at the grow house, in a Mexican standoff with both the gangsters and the mobsters pointing guns at her in a season-ending cliffhanger.

== Cast ==
=== Main cast ===
- Mary-Louise Parker as Nancy Botwin (12 episodes)
- Elizabeth Perkins as Celia Hodes (12 episodes)
- Tonye Patano as Heylia James (11 episodes)
- Romany Malco as Conrad Shepherd (12 episodes)
- Justin Kirk as Andy Botwin (12 episodes)
- Hunter Parrish as Silas Botwin (12 episodes)
- Alexander Gould as Shane Botwin (12 episodes)
- Kevin Nealon as Doug Wilson (12 episodes)

=== Special guest stars ===
- Zooey Deschanel as Kat Wheeler
- Martin Donovan as Peter Scottson

=== Recurring cast ===
- Indigo as Vaneeta James
- Renée Victor as Lupita
- Andy Milder as Dean Hodes
- Maulik Pancholy as Sanjay Patel
- Meital Dohan as Yael Hoffman
- Fatso-Fasano as Marvin
- Allie Grant as Isabelle Hodes
- Shoshannah Stern as Megan Graves
- Eden Sher as Gretchen
- Daryl Sabara as Tim Scottson
- Vincent Laresca as Alejandro
- Becky Thyre as Pam Gruber
- David Doty as Principal Dodge
- Page Kennedy as U-Turn
- Jack Stehlin as Captain Roy Till
- Remy Auberjonois as Mr. Albin
- Sammy Fine as Benj
- Bob Rumnock as Mr. Lippman
- Eric Cadora as Agent Shuman
- Ron Canada as Joseph
- Shawn Michael Patrick as Agent Fundis
- Arthur Darbinyan as Aram Keshisyan
- Robert Allen Mukes as Abumchuk
- Kasey Campbell as Shut Up
- Cody Klop as No Way
- Craig X. Rubin as Craig X
- David Bardeen as Director

== Episodes ==
No. overall	No. in season	Title	Directed by	Written by	Theme song performer(s)	Original release date
11	1	"Corn Snake"	Craig Zisk	Jenji Kohan	Elvis Costello	August 14, 2006
After discovering that Peter is a DEA agent, Nancy quickly exits his house and breaks off contact with him. Conrad dumps Nancy as a business partner when he discovers she slept with a DEA agent. Andy applies to rabbinical school to get out of serving in the Army Reserves and is assigned to write an application essay. Silas has sex with Megan in the Botwin house; this exacerbates the tension between Silas and Nancy. Celia has an accident at a dangerous intersection. After Doug denies Celia's request to install a traffic light, she decides to run against him in the upcoming city council election. Upset that Celia does not want him to be her campaign manager, Dean works for Doug's campaign instead. Sanjay burns down the bakery so Nancy can collect on the insurance.
12	2	"Cooking with Jesus"	Craig Zisk	Jenji Kohan	Death Cab for Cutie	August 21, 2006
Nancy calls Peter and cuts off their budding relationship. Celia gears up for her campaign with a family photograph. However, when Dean, Quinn, and Isabelle refuse, she opts for a personal portrait. She imposes upon Nancy for help with her campaign. Armed with her fire insurance benefit, Nancy and her team try to move on without Conrad. Alejandro leaves the group. Nancy attends a marijuana convention where she buys a plant to replace Conrad's plant. When the plant dies and Conrad fails to get himself a grow loan, the two realize they each need what the other has and they partner up again. Megan earns admission into Princeton University. When Silas replies that he can't get into Princeton because "[he's] not deaf," she storms off. Andy earns admission into the rabbinical school. Peter demands an audience with Nancy and tells her that he knows she is a drug dealer.
13	3	"Last Tango in Agrestic"	Bryan Gordon	Roberto Benabib	Engelbert Humperdinck	August 28, 2006
Nancy is upset to learn that Peter knows she's a drug dealer; however, he asserts that "Women dealing dime bags to bored housewives are below my radar," and develops a plan to make their relationship work. Celia signs Isabelle up for exercise classes and gets roped into them herself. Silas and Megan reconcile and have a sexual marathon; Silas punctures a hole in one of their condoms in an attempt to get her pregnant so she won't leave for college. Heylia develops a crush on her neighbor Joseph. Andy asks the rabbinical school administrator, Yael Hoffman, out on a date. Andy talks to Shane about masturbation. Nancy's team rents a grow house. Dean discovers that the Conrad in their group had sex with Celia. Peter and Nancy elope to Las Vegas so Peter cannot testify against Nancy.
14	4	"A.K.A. The Plant"	Lev L. Spiro	Matthew Salsberg	Kate & Anna McGarrigle	September 4, 2006
While campaigning, Celia and Nancy discover that most Agrestic residents are supporting Doug. Dean loses his job at the law firm and then punches Conrad. Celia is embarrassed when a talent agent wants Isabelle to audition for Huskaroos, a line of children's plus-sized clothes. Andy takes Shane to a massage parlor to get his initial handjob. Joseph calls on Heylia for a date. Andy and Yael have dinner together, but Yael reveals she does not want to date Andy. Peter and Nancy go to the shooting range on a date. After Nancy's team cleans out the grow house, a specialist installs the hydroponics equipment. During the installation, drug kingpin Aram Kashishian arrives and issues an ultimatum for them to move out. Despite Conrad's warnings, Nancy decides to continue the operation anyway. Silas tells Nancy that Megan is pregnant.
15	5	"Mrs. Botwin's Neighborhood"	Craig Zisk	Rolin Jones	Charles Barnett	September 11, 2006
Nancy tests and retests Megan for pregnancy; all the tests read positive. Megan goes to talk to her parents by herself, leaving Silas to nervously wait. When Silas discovers Megan was forced to get an abortion by her parents, he goes to her house to demand an audience. Instead, he fights with Megan's father before Nancy picks him up. Heylia prepares for her date with Joseph. After Principal Dodge overhears Shane bragging about his experience at the massage parlor, Andy convinces the principal that Shane made it up to impress his friends. Nancy, who can no longer tolerate Celia's self-centeredness, ends her friendship with her. Isabelle auditions for the Huskaroos commercial, to Celia's dismay. When Conrad discovers that Kashishian has four grow houses within sight of theirs, Nancy asks Peter for help. Peter leads a raid on Kashishian's grow houses as a wedding present for Nancy.
16	6	"Crush Girl Love Panic"	Tucker Gates	Devon K. Shepard	Aidan Hawken	September 18, 2006
After the raid, Conrad and Nancy discover that — in their panic — Andy and Sanjay had trashed the grow house. Because theirs was the only grow house that didn't get busted, Conrad concludes that Nancy is still dating Peter; Nancy admits that she married him for spousal privilege. A depressed Silas barricades himself in his room until Nancy agrees to buy him a car. Shane expresses a romantic interest in a classmate, Gretchen, and joins the debate team in order to get closer to her. Isabelle lands the Huskaroos job; in order to keep her earning, Isabelle opens a trust with Doug's accounting firm and designates Dean as her signatory. Yael sexually pegs Andy. When Joseph visits Heylia's house for dinner, Vaneeta confronts him about his religious beliefs. To smooth over relations between Conrad and Peter, Nancy arranges a meeting with the two men; however, her gambit fails when Peter advises them to not expand and instead sell all the plants to state-regulated cannabis clubs.
17	7	"Must Find Toes"	Chris Long	Michael Platt & Barry Safchik	Ozomatli	September 25, 2006
An Armenian canine eats two toes off Andy's left foot. Yael visits Andy with renewed interest after his injury, but she dumps him after Andy reveals he is leaving the rabbinate, believing his missing toes should be enough to get him out of his Reserve duty. On election day, Doug discovers that his name is not on the ballot. He mounts a last-minute write-in campaign, but Celia wins narrowly. After Dean reveals that he forgot to file Doug's paperwork, their relationship instantly sours. Celia reveals to Dean that she intends to mount an anti-drug campaign. Shane wins a debate over Gretchen by saying "George W. Bush" and appealing to resentment over the Florida election recount. Gretchen's response to Shane: "You suck." Silas asks Nancy to allow him to sell pot, but she refuses. Conrad considers ending his partnership with Nancy, but ultimately decides not to. Conrad and Nancy share an intimate moment in the grow house by smoking pot together.
18	8	"MILF Money"	Craig Zisk	Shawn Schepps	The Submarines	October 2, 2006
Conrad and Nancy's drug business goes well, and they sell the new pot strain at a recording studio; Snoop Dogg names it "Mother I'd love to fuck", or MILF weed for short. Nancy and Conrad pay off their workers except for Andy, because he has been mooching off Nancy. Andy quits the team in response. Nancy goes on a shopping spree. Celia gives an anti-drug lecture at the elementary school, and formally announces that drug-free zone signs and video cameras will be installed throughout the city. Shane publicly opposes the campaign; he wins the respect of his classmates and impresses Gretchen. Realizing she is losing customers, Heylia confronts U-Turn, a local drug kingpin, who reveals Nancy and Conrad's operation. Heylia furiously confronts Conrad at the grow house and buys a large supply of MILF weed for re-sale. Peter reveals to Nancy that he is targeting Heylia as part of a plan to arrest U-Turn.
19	9	"Bash"	Christopher Misiano	Rinne Groff	Tim DeLaughter	October 9, 2006
Peter leads a raid upon Heylia's house but discovers Joseph leading an Islamic prayer service. Realizing that Nancy had tipped Heylia off, Peter angrily confronts Nancy, pressuring her to quit the drug trade and marry him "for real." Joseph and Heylia end their relationship. Conrad and Nancy install a safe for storing their pot. Shane is elected to give the valedictory at his elementary school graduation, and he and Gretchen begin dating. Celia begins her term on the city council and reluctantly turns to Doug for guidance. While drinking vodka, their libidos kick into gear, and they start having sex. Shane witnesses Peter drive away while wearing his DEA windbreaker. While the Botwin family throws a celebration for Judah's birthday, Shane reveals Peter's occupation to Andy and Silas and informs them that Peter and Nancy are dating. This enrages Silas, who concludes that Nancy has given up on Judah. When Silas points out the risks of dating a DEA agent, she tells Silas that she married Peter.
20	10	"Mile Deep and a Foot Wide"	Craig Zisk	Rolin Jones	Regina Spektor	October 16, 2006
Heylia pressures Nancy into persuading Peter to stop the DEA's investigation into Heylia's operations, and Conrad instructs Nancy to marry Peter and quit the drug operation. Once Peter stops investigating Heylia, Conrad will move his operation elsewhere. When Peter tentatively agrees to this deal, she invites him to dinner to meet the Botwin family. Kat, Andy's crazy ex-girlfriend from Alaska, arrives in Agrestic. She implores Andy to join her on a road trip, but he refuses, committed to raising Silas and Shane. Doug and Celia continue their affair; Celia reveals that someone has been stealing the drug-free zone cameras and signs. Silas acts like a brat at dinner, impugns Peter's motives for dating Nancy, and flips off Peter; Peter mildly assaults Silas for defying Nancy's orders. Following the incident, Nancy tries to have sex with Peter, but ultimately sends him away. Nancy then calls Conrad, informing him that she does not want Peter back and she will never love him; they decide to string Peter along until the current crop is harvested. Unfortunately, Peter wiretapped their conversation.
21	11	"Yeah. Like Tomatoes" (Note: The title of the episode on Netflix is "Yeah, Just Like Tomatoes"., while on TV Guide it is "Yeah, Like Tomatoes".) "Yeah. Just Like Tomatoes"	Craig Zisk	Roberto Benabib & Matthew Salsberg	Jenny Lewis & Johnathan Rice	October 23, 2006
Angry over Nancy's betrayal, Peter confronts Conrad and Nancy with his weapon drawn and demands they make a final harvest and give all the money to him. After that, Nancy will move far away so Peter will never see her again. Conrad makes a deal to sell to U-Turn, but U-Turn plans to steal their crop instead. When Nancy asks Conrad to leave town, he refuses and then kisses Nancy. Heylia visits Kashishian and makes him an unknown offer. Shane has developed a crush on Kat and expresses it in front of Gretchen, who becomes jealous. Kat notifies Andy that Abumchuck, a bounty hunter aiming to arrest her, has arrived. After making a pact with Doug to end their marriages, Celia informs Dean of her affair with Doug. Dean kicks her out and demands a divorce. Doug, however, does not break the news to Dana. Nancy tells the family about her plan to move; Shane deduces that Nancy is a drug dealer. When Silas storms out, Nancy invades his room and discovers the stolen cameras and signs.
22	12	"Pittsburgh"	Craig Zisk	Jenji Kohan	Malvina Reynolds	October 30, 2006
Celia discovers video proof that Silas stole the video cameras. Still angry with his mother, Shane takes the parents of Agrestic to task for failing their children during his valedictory. At the graduation party, Shane and Gretchen break up, Doug and Dean fight, and Andy gives Kat the keys to his van; Kat leaves with Shane. When Andy learns of the kidnapping, he and Abumchuck drive off in pursuit. At the grow house, Sanjay shows up unexpectedly; Nancy hides him in the closet. While Peter waits outside the house, Kashishian's men — having been ordered by Heylia — sneak into his car and kill him. Upon arriving at the grow house, U-Turn and Marvin pull guns on Conrad and Nancy and announce they are going to steal their MILF weed. Seconds later, Kashishian's men arrive demanding their money for killing Peter. When Nancy opens the safe, she discovers that the pot is missing. She calls Silas; he tells Nancy that he stole it and demands to be cut into her action. Seconds later, Celia and a police officer approach Silas and his car in which the pot is hidden. The season ends with five guns pointed at Nancy.

== Reception ==
=== Reviews ===
The second season received critical acclaim from critics. On review aggregator Rotten Tomatoes, the season received a perfect approval rating of 100% based on 15 reviews. The site's critical consensus reads: "Weeds' sophomore season elevates the series' satire to a new high, complemented by a perfected balance between suburban ennui and life-or-death stakes." On Metacritic, the second season received a 78 out of 100, indicating generally favorable reviews. Eric Goldman of IGN praised the season's balance between comedy and drama, commenting that Nancy's story "[adds] an increasing element of danger to the series that meshed surprisingly well with the wackier aspects of the story." James Donaghy of The Guardian also praised the balance of comedy and drama, writing "Season two takes us into darker territory while still managing to be funny, shocking and occasionally inspiring." Linda Stasi of the New York Post wrote "Weeds hasn't dropped a petal or missed even a beat this season," and praised the comedic performances of Renee Victor as Lupita and Tonye Patano as Heylia.

=== Accolades ===
The second season received five Primetime Emmy Award nominations; it was nominated twice for Outstanding Single-camera Picture Editing for a Comedy Series, Outstanding Casting for a Comedy Series, Elizabeth Perkins was nominated for Outstanding Supporting Actress in a Comedy Series, and Mary-Louise Parker was nominated for Outstanding Lead Actress in a Comedy Series. The series received four Golden Globe Award nominations, including Best Television Series Musical or Comedy, Parker for Best Actress in a Television Series Musical or Comedy, Perkins for Best Supporting Actress in a Series, and Justin Kirk for Best Supporting Actor in a Series. At the Satellite Awards, Perkins was nominated for Best Actress in a Supporting Role in a Series, and Parker was nominated for Best Actress in a Series, Comedy or Musical. Alexander Gould won a Young Artist Award for his supporting role as Shane Botwin. Romany Malco, playing Conrad, received a nomination for Outstanding Supporting Actor in a Comedy Series at the NAACP Image Awards.

Year	Award	Category	Nominee(s)	Result	Ref.
2007	Golden Globe Awards	Best Actress – Television Series Musical or Comedy	Mary-Louise Parker	Nominated	
2007	Golden Globe Awards	Best Supporting Actress – Series, Miniseries or Television Film	Elizabeth Perkins	Nominated	
2007	Golden Globe Awards	Best Supporting Actor – Series, Miniseries or Television Film	Justin Kirk	Nominated	
2007	Golden Globe Awards	Best Television Series – Musical or Comedy	Weeds	Nominated	
2007	Primetime Emmy Awards	Outstanding Casting for a Comedy Series	Weeds	Nominated	
2007	Primetime Emmy Awards	Outstanding Single-Camera Picture Editing for a Comedy Series	David Helfand (for ’’Mrs. Botwin’s Neighborhood’’)	Nominated	
2007	Primetime Emmy Awards	Outstanding Single-Camera Picture Editing for a Comedy Series	William Turro (for ’’Crush Girl Love Panic’’)	Nominated	
2007	Primetime Emmy Awards	Outstanding Supporting Actress in a Comedy Series	Elizabeth Perkins	Nominated	
2007	Primetime Emmy Awards	Outstanding Lead Actress in a Comedy Series	Mary-Louise Parker	Nominated	
2007	NAACP Image Awards	Outstanding Supporting Actor in a Comedy Series	Romany Malco	Nominated	
2007	Young Artist Awards	Best Performance in a TV Series - Supporting Young Actor	Alexander Gould	Won	
2007	Young Artist Awards	Best Performance in a TV Series - Supporting Young Actor	Allie Grant	Nominated	
2007	Young Artist Awards	Best Performance in a TV Series - Recurring Young Actor	Kasey Campbell	Nominated	
