= Weeds season 1 =

Season of television series

Weeds
- Season 1
- DVD cover
- Starring: Mary-Louise Parker; Elizabeth Perkins; Tonye Patano; Romany Malco; Justin Kirk; Hunter Parrish; Alexander Gould; Kevin Nealon
- No. of episodes: 10

Release
- Original network: Showtime
- Original release: August 8 – October 10, 2005

Season chronology
- Next → Season 2

The first season of Weeds, an American dark comedy-drama television series created by Jenji Kohan, premiered on August 8, 2005, on the premium cable network Showtime. The principal cast consisted of Mary-Louise Parker, Elizabeth Perkins, Tonye Patano, Romany Malco, Justin Kirk, Hunter Parrish, Alexander Gould, and Kevin Nealon. The season had ten episodes, and its initial airing concluded on October 10, 2005. Season one focuses on Nancy Botwin (Parker), a single mother living in the suburban town of Agrestic, who begins dealing marijuana in an effort to maintain her family's upper middle class lifestyle following the death of her husband.

== Episodes ==
No. overall	No. in season	Title	Directed by	Written by	Original release date
1	1	"You Can't Miss the Bear"	Brian Dannelly	Jenji Kohan	August 8, 2005
Nancy Botwin is grieving the loss of her husband, Judah. In an effort to support her two sons, Silas and Shane, Nancy has turned to dealing marijuana to her affluent neighbors in the picturesque suburb of Agrestic, CA. She buys her product from Heylia James, who runs a marijuana business in the West Adams district. Nancy sells some of her product to Josh, a fellow dealer. When Nancy discovers that Josh has been dealing to young children, she uses newly found personal information about Josh to stop him. Meanwhile, Shane is being bullied at school; he retaliates by spraying his bully with paint from a squirt gun. Silas and his girlfriend Quinn conspire to have sex. Quinn rebels against her mother, Celia, by recording an affair between her father and a tennis pro; Celia later sees the recording and is forced to deal with her husband's infidelity.
2	2	"Free Goat"	Brian Dannelly	Jenji Kohan	August 15, 2005
Unable to deposit her pot money at the bank, Nancy is unable to pay her bills, and she turns to crooked city councilman Doug Wilson; Doug suggests Nancy start a cover business to launder money through. To obtain product on credit, Nancy offers her car and wedding ring to Heylia as collateral. Celia shaves the hair off of Dean's head as retaliation for his affair. Silas confronts Celia, concerned over Quinn's disappearance. Celia tells him that she was sent to a reform school in Mexico, but doesn't tell him that it was punishment for recording Dean's affair. Celia confronts Helen Chin, the woman with whom Dean had an affair, and they have drinks at a local bar. Shane grieves for his father by watching old home videos on his video camera. Nancy later discovers the camera and, overcome with emotion, smashes it to pieces.
3	3	"Good Shit Lollipop"	Craig Zisk	Roberto Benabib	August 22, 2005
After being introduced to the medical cannabis clubs in Los Angeles, Nancy discovers that Heylia has been selling her a low quality product. Heylia's nephew Conrad helps Nancy produce tasty Cannabis edibles, which are successful with Doug's poker group. Celia finds out her overweight daughter Isabelle has been sneaking food, and she replaces Isabelle's secret chocolate stash with laxative chocolates. After Isabelle soils herself at school, she retaliates by stuffing Imodium into Celia's pill box. Silas meets a local deaf girl, Megan, and asks her for a blow job; Megan sprays blue paint across his pants instead. Despite his bad first impression, Megan decides to give Silas a second chance. Shane shoots a neighbor’s cat in its face with a BB gun; Shane's violent behavior worries Nancy.
4	4	"Fashion of the Christ"	Burr Steers	Jenji Kohan	August 29, 2005
Judah's slacker brother, Andy Botwin, arrives from Alaska. Nancy is not thrilled to see him, telling him "everything you touch turns to shit." Andy recruits Shane to sell T-shirts with a typo (spelling "Chris died for your sins") that offends the religious community; he also engages in a sex chat with Megan using Silas's screenname. Enraged by Andy's behavior, Nancy threatens to throw him out of the house. However, Andy reveals that he had learned of Nancy's drug business through Conrad and asks to join her. Andy also convinces Silas that his chat only encouraged Megan to want Silas more, which prompts Megan and Silas to start an intense physical relationship. Nancy chooses a bakery for her choice of cover business; Doug scouts potential locations for the bakery. After a crate of soda pop crashes into Celia's house, Celia tells Dean that she has breast cancer.
5	5	"Lude Awakening"	Lee Rose	Devon K. Shepard	September 5, 2005
Nancy experiences the dangerous side of dealing when a shootout occurs at Heylia's. Distraught by the shootout, Nancy contemplates leaving the business. Andy meets Doug, and they instantly bond over their love for porn and pot. Andy approaches Nancy about working with her for the sham bakery. When Nancy turns him down, Andy buys an ounce of weed from Heylia to sell in Agrestic; he is caught by a police officer and gets arrested. Silas dumps Megan and then tries to woo her back. Celia reels from her breast cancer diagnosis by giving away lots of clothes and furniture to her housekeeper. Shane writes a rap song about killing a fellow student; Nancy verbally chastises him. Shane has a discussion with Celia about how they both make people uncomfortable. She advises him to "Let your freak flag fly."
6	6	"Dead in the Nethers"	Arlene Sanford	Michael Platt & Barry Safchik	September 12, 2005
Following his arrest, Andy is ordered to attend Narcotics Anonymous meetings. After his first meeting, Andy gets high with his female sponsor. Nancy signs Doug's paperwork needed to open the sham bakery. Conrad visits Agrestic to help Nancy set up the bakery. In the process, Conrad meets Celia, who invites him and Nancy to join her at a dance club before she undergoes breast removal surgery. Celia ends up having sex with Conrad. Silas and Megan normalize their relationship. Shane makes a fake terrorist video that shocks Nancy. Nancy's housekeeper Lupita discovers Nancy's cache of marijuana in her closet; she blackmails Nancy into giving her a raise. Nancy mourns Judah's death by watching a tape of them making love.
7	7	"Higher Education"	Tucker Gates	Shawn Schepps	September 19, 2005
Silas' tutor, Sanjay, confides to Nancy about needing more work. Nancy decides to recruit Sanjay to deal pot as she expands her sales territory into Sanjay's community college, Valley State. Shane makes a new friend at school, and Andy has sex with the friend's mother. Andy wants to stop having sex with her due to her unusually rough antics, but Nancy orders Andy to "keep fucking the biter", as it could jeopardize Shane's one friendship. Celia's obnoxious mother makes life at the Hodes' house difficult until they kick her out. Someone throws a roll of pennies at Nancy's car; Conrad hypothesizes that another dealer is threatening her.
8	8	"The Punishment Light"	Robert Berlinger	Rolin Jones	September 26, 2005
The Botwin family unveils Judah's headstone during a small ceremony. Nancy meets single father, Peter Scottson, after Shane bites the foot of Peter's son during a karate tournament. Nancy and Peter get to know each other at a restaurant, and they share an unexpected kiss. Since Nancy is still coming to terms with Judah's death, they ultimately agree to temporarily part ways. While Nancy is away, Andy and Doug bond by hunting a rodent and trashing Nancy's house. Celia confesses to Dean that she had sex with Conrad, resulting in an argument, which is followed by a round of passionate sex. Alejandro, a rival drug dealer who threw the pennies at Nancy's car, confronts Lupita. After Lupita informs Nancy of the incident, Nancy confronts Alejandro in an alley; they have an unexpected round of sex before she threatens him with a BB gun.
9	9	"The Punishment Lighter"	Paul Feig	Matthew Salsberg	October 3, 2005
The sham bakery opens. Unfortunately, a security guard at Valley State who also deals drugs threatens to arrest Nancy, before stealing her $14,000 worth of pot. Nancy confides to Heylia and Conrad. Alejandro offers to professionally partner with Nancy. Silas bonds with Megan's father and begins to spend more time with her family. Nancy considers starting Shane on anti-depressants. Shane steals Silas' cigarette lighter, which is confiscated when he takes it to school. Silas angrily punches Shane for losing the lighter, as the lighter was a gift from Judah. Celia begins chemotherapy and reclaims her leadership position of the PTA. Nancy is surprised when the security guard, having been beat up, returns all of her pot.
10	10	"The Godmother"	Lev L. Spiro	Jenji Kohan	October 10, 2005
It is revealed that Conrad and his friends beat up the security guard; Heylia lectures Conrad over the fight and orders him to cut off all contact with Nancy. Silas reveals to Nancy that he knows she deals pot. Andy advises Nancy to inform Shane about her business, as Silas was angry about being lied to, but Nancy ignores his advice. Andy tells Doug that he enlisted into the Army Reserves in Colorado to impress a girl and "forgot" about it; Andy is now being ordered to report or face jail time. Celia shows her disapproval when Isabelle comes out as a lesbian. When Heylia refuses to start growing Conrad's new special strain of marijuana, Conrad approaches Nancy about becoming a grower. Nancy agrees, and the two form a team consisting of Dean, Doug, Alejandro, Sanjay, and Andy to work their operation. Nancy chooses to make time for Peter. After having sex, Nancy discovers that Peter works for the Drug Enforcement Administration.

== Cast ==
=== Main cast ===
- Mary-Louise Parker as Nancy Botwin, a single mother and marijuana dealer
- Elizabeth Perkins as Celia Hodes, Botwin's self-centered neighbor
- Tonye Patano as Heylia James, Botwin's hardheaded drug supplier
- Romany Malco as Conrad Shepard, Botwin's initial supplier and James's nephew
- Justin Kirk as Andrew "Andy" Botwin, Botwin's carefree brother-in-law
- Hunter Parrish as Silas Botwin, the eldest Botwin child
- Alexander Gould as Shane Botwin, the youngest Botwin child
- Kevin Nealon as Doug Wilson, Botwin's irresponsible accountant

=== Recurring cast ===
- Andy Milder as Dean Hodes, Celia's unfaithful husband
- Renée Victor as Lupita, the Botwin family's maid
- Indigo as Vaneeta James, James's daughter and employee
- Shoshannah Stern as Megan Beals, Silas Botwin's deaf girlfriend
- Tressa DiFiglia as Maggie, the Agrestic PTA chairwoman
- Allie Grant as Isabelle Hodes, Hodes's youngest daughter
- Becky Thyre as Pam Gruber, an Agrestic PTA member
- Shawn Schepps as Alison, an Agrestic PTA member
- Maulik Pancholy as Sanjay Patel, a college student who Botwin employs
- Vincent Laresca as Alejandro, Botwin's rival dealer
- Martin Donovan as Peter Scottson, Botwin's DEA agent boyfriend
- David Doty as Principal Dodge, the principal of Agrestic Elementary
- Jeffrey Dean Morgan as Judah Botwin, Botwin's late husband
- Tyrone Mitchell as Keeyon James, James's son and employee
- Haley Hudson as Quinn Hodes, Hodes's eldest daughter
- Daryl Sabara as Tim Scottson, Scottson's son
- Justin Chatwin as Josh Wilson, Wilson's son
- Craig X. Rubin as Craig X, a marijuana dispensary employee

== Reception ==
=== Viewership ===
Weeds debuted to 538,000 U.S. viewers, which was modest in comparison to the viewership of Showtime's other television series.

=== Critical response ===
The season received generally positive reviews from critics. On Rotten Tomatoes, the first season of Weeds received 79%. The site's critics consensus reads: "Weeds is a cheeky comedy with dark, humorous, and sometimes outrageous moments centered around a talented female-led cast including Emmy winner Mary-Louise Parker." On Metacritic, the first season received a 70 out of 100, indicating generally favorable reviews. Gillian Flynn of Entertainment Weekly spoke highly of Parker and Nealon's performances, and praised the acting of Perkins as Celia Hodes, writing "Perkins is so perfectly, nastily desperate that she gets away with it." David Wiegand of the San Francisco Chronicle also praised the acting of Parker and Perkins, and stated "Weeds may indeed be the best written new show of the year." Alessandra Stanley of The New York Times wrote "Weeds is well written and engrossing, and has a slick balance of satire and soap opera." Ed Gonzalez of Slant Magazine gave a mixed review of the season, praising the performances of Perkins and Gould, but criticizing the characterization of Nancy, commenting: "There's a sense that the writers of Weeds are as lazy as their main character, that they understand her as little as she seems to understand herself." However, Gonzalez spoke highly of Parker's acting, writing "Parker brings a great performance to a less than one-dimensional part."

Some critics criticized the depiction of Heylia and her family, believing that the characters perpetuated harmful black stereotypes. Dana Stevens of Slate Magazine gave a positive review, but commented "the black characters, led by a sassy matriarch named Heylia [...] seemed to embody the most egregious of African-American stereotypes." In an NPR interview, commentator Betty Bayé stated "[Weeds is] the latest chapter in a long history of negative black stereotypes in the media." In response to the criticism, series creator Jenji Kohan commented that the characters of Heylia, Conrad and Vaneeta were inspired by her friends in Venice Beach, stating: "Heylia and her family are kind of [a] homage to that time in my life and those guys", further commenting "I knew them, and this is my experience of how they spoke and how they related".

=== Accolades ===
The first season received numerous awards and nominations, including three Golden Globe Awards nominations with one win. Mary-Louise Parker won for Best Actress in a Television Series Musical or Comedy. The series was nominated for Best Television Series Musical or Comedy, and Elizabeth Perkins was nominated for Best Supporting Actress in a Series, Miniseries or Television Film. The show also received five Primetime Emmy Award nominations. It was nominated for Outstanding Casting for a Comedy Series, Outstanding Main Title Design, Outstanding Single-camera Picture Editing for a Comedy Series, Elizabeth Perkins was nominated for Outstanding Supporting Actress in a Comedy Series, and Craig Zisk was nominated for Outstanding Directing for a Comedy Series. Parker won a Satellite Award for Best Actress in a Musical or Comedy Series, and Perkins was nominated for the same category.

Year	Award	Category	Nominee(s)	Result	Ref.
2006	Golden Globe Awards	Best Actress – Television Series Musical or Comedy	Mary-Louise Parker	Won	
2006	Golden Globe Awards	Best Supporting Actress – Series, Miniseries or Television Film	Elizabeth Perkins	Nominated	
2006	Golden Globe Awards	Best Television Series – Musical or Comedy	Weeds	Nominated	
2006	Primetime Emmy Awards	Outstanding Casting for a Comedy Series	Weeds	Nominated	
2006	Primetime Emmy Awards	Outstanding Main Title Design	Weeds	Nominated	
2006	Primetime Emmy Awards	Outstanding Single-Camera Picture Editing for a Comedy Series	Weeds	Nominated	
2006	Primetime Emmy Awards	Outstanding Directing for a Comedy Series	Craig Zisk (for ‘’Good Shit Lollipop’’)	Nominated	
2006	Primetime Emmy Awards	Outstanding Supporting Actress in a Comedy Series	Elizabeth Perkins	Nominated	

== Home media ==
On July 11, 2006, Lionsgate released the first season of Weeds on the DVD format; the season was released on the Blu-ray Disc format on May 29, 2007. In addition to the ten episodes, both formats contain bonus content including six audio commentaries, behind the scenes with cast and crew, two featurettes, and season trailers.
