= The Individuals =

The Individuals is the name of two American musical acts:

- The Individuals (New Jersey band), a Hoboken band active in the early 1980s.
- The Individuals (Chicago band), a hip-hop band active since the early 2000s.
- The Individuals (Greenville, SC) Punk/Indie Rock Band, an indie-rock/punk rock band since 2005.

There is also an Italian or Italian-American band called The Individuals whose English language song "Take a Ride" was used on the FIFA series soundtracks as well as in Cats And Dogs, The Revenge Of Kitty Galore
