= Cankles =

Cankles or Kankles may refer to:

== Medicine ==
- Cankle, a lack of definition between the calf and ankle, with several causes including:
  - Obesity
  - Edema
  - Congestive heart failure

== Other uses ==
- "Cankles" (Weeds), an episode of the American television series
- Kanklės, a Lithuanian musical instrument
