= Gwendolyn Sanford =

American singer-songwriter and composer

Gwendolyn Sanford is an American singer-songwriter and composer. She is best known for her performances with Gwendolyn and the Good Time Gang and for her contributions to the scores for Weeds, Orange Is the New Black, and other films and plays.

== Biography ==
Sanford was born in Philadelphia and raised in Sierra Madre, California. Sanford studied acting at the Los Angeles County School High School for the Arts. While in school, she learned to play guitar and at age 27, formed Gwendolyn and the Good Time Gang. The group was first noticed at a 2003 street fair in Los Feliz.

In addition to her solo works, Sanford, and her husband Brandon Jay, recorded four albums of children's music as Gwendolyn and the Good Time Gang.

== Film, TV, and stage ==
Sanford, Brandon Jay and Scott Doherty compose music for Netflix's original series Orange Is the New Black. Prior, Gwendolyn and Brandon Jay composed the score for Weeds. At least two different versions of Gwendolyn's song "Freedom of the Heart (Ooodily, Ooodily)" are prominently featured in Mike White's 2000 film Chuck & Buck. She and Jay composed music for the play, Gruesome Playground Injuries. Sanford wrote the music and lyrics for Romy and Michele's High School Reunion the musical, which first premiered June 15, 2017, at The 5th Avenue Theatre in Seattle, WA.

== Awards ==
In 2015, 2016, 2017, 2018 and 2020 she received an award BMI for her work on the Netflix show Orange Is The New Black.

In 2007, she received an award BMI for her work on the TV show Weeds.

In 2003, Sanford was recognized at LA Weekly Music Awards as the Best New Genre/Uncategorizable Artist. Also in 2003, Gwendolyn won KFPK radio's The Music Never Stops No. 1 Album of the Year" award for Dew and Amoeba Music named Sanford as their "Homegrown Artist Pick".

== Discography ==
=== Solo ===
To date, Gwendolyn has recorded four solo albums.

- Ultrasounds (2000)
- Dew (2003)
- Lower Mill Road (2007)
- Bright Light (2011)

=== Gwendolyn and the Good Time Gang ===
Gwendolyn has released four children's albums as "Gwendolyn and the Good Time Gang":

- Gwendolyn and the Good Time Gang (2003)
- Tis The Season To Be Rockin (2004)
- Get Up And Dance! (2007)
- Clap Your Hands (2010)

And a live concert DVD

- Live in Grandma's Living Room! (2005)

The "Good Time Gang" performs for children's events, mainly in California.

== Affiliates ==
Musicians in Gwendolyn's live band include:

- Douglas Lee (glass harmonica)
- Brandon Jay (drums, found percussion)
- Robert Petersen (upright bass)
- Scott Doherty (piano, electric guitar, banjo)
- Roger Park (pedal steel)

Musicians Gwendolyn has worked with include:

- Smokey Hormel
- Ralph Carney
- Joey Waronker
- Don Fleming
- Ben Vaughn
- John McCusker
- Ethan Allen
- Tony Gilkyson
