= Weeds (TV series) =

American dark comedy-drama television series

- Genre: Black comedy Comedy drama Satire
- Created by: Jenji Kohan
- Showrunner: Jenji Kohan
- Written by: Jenji Kohan (21 episodes); Roberto Benabib (14 episodes); Matthew Salsberg (12 episodes); Victoria Morrow (11 episodes); Rolin Jones (9 episodes); Stephen Falk (9 episodes); Brendan Kelly (8 episodes); Dave Holstein (7 episodes); and others
- Directed by: Craig Zisk (20 episodes); Scott Ellis (18 episodes); Michael Trim (18 episodes); and others
- Starring: Mary-Louise Parker; Elizabeth Perkins; Justin Kirk; Tonye Patano; Romany Malco; Hunter Parrish; Alexander Gould; Andy Milder; Allie Grant; Kevin Nealon
- Opening theme: "Little Boxes"
- Composers: Joey Santiago (season 1); Gwendolyn Sanford & Brandon Jay (seasons 2–8)
- Country of origin: United States
- Original language: English
- No. of seasons: 8
- No. of episodes: 102 (list of episodes)

Production
- Executive producers: Jenji Kohan; Roberto Benabib (seasons 3–8); Craig Zisk (seasons 3–5); Matthew Salsberg (seasons 6–8); Mark A. Burley (seasons 7–8); Scott Ellis (season 8); Lisa I. Vinnecour (season 8)
- Production locations: Red Studios (seasons 1–6) and Universal Studios (seasons 7–8) in Hollywood, Los Angeles, California
- Running time: 26–31 minutes
- Production companies: Tilted Productions; Lionsgate Television; Showtime Networks

Original release
- Network: Showtime
- Release: August 8, 2005 – September 16, 2012

Weeds is an American dark comedy-drama television series created by Jenji Kohan, which aired on Showtime from August 8, 2005, to September 16, 2012. The series tells of Nancy Botwin (Mary-Louise Parker), a widowed mother of two boys (Hunter Parrish and Alexander Gould) who begins selling marijuana to support her family. Other main characters include Nancy's lax brother-in-law (Justin Kirk); foolish accountant Doug Wilson (Kevin Nealon); narcissistic neighbor Celia Hodes (Elizabeth Perkins) living with her husband (Andy Milder) and their daughter (Allie Grant); as well as Nancy's wholesalers Heylia James (Tonye Patano) and Conrad Shepard (Romany Malco). Over the course of the series, the Botwin family becomes increasingly entangled in illegal activity.

Kohan serves as showrunner and is executive producer, under her Tilted Productions label. The first three seasons are set primarily in the fictional town of Agrestic, located in the San Fernando Valley of Los Angeles, California. During seasons four and five, the Botwins reside in the also fictional San Diego suburb of Ren Mar. In season six, the family relocates to Seattle, Washington and Dearborn, Michigan. In season seven, the family resides in New York City, living in Manhattan for the duration of the season, but relocates to Connecticut in the season seven finale and throughout season eight.

When the show debuted on the Showtime cable network, it earned the channel's highest ratings. In 2012, TV Guide Network bought the airing rights and provided an edited version of the show. The show has received numerous awards, including two Emmy Awards, two Satellite Awards, one Golden Globe Award, a Writers Guild Award, and a Young Artist Award.

== Production ==
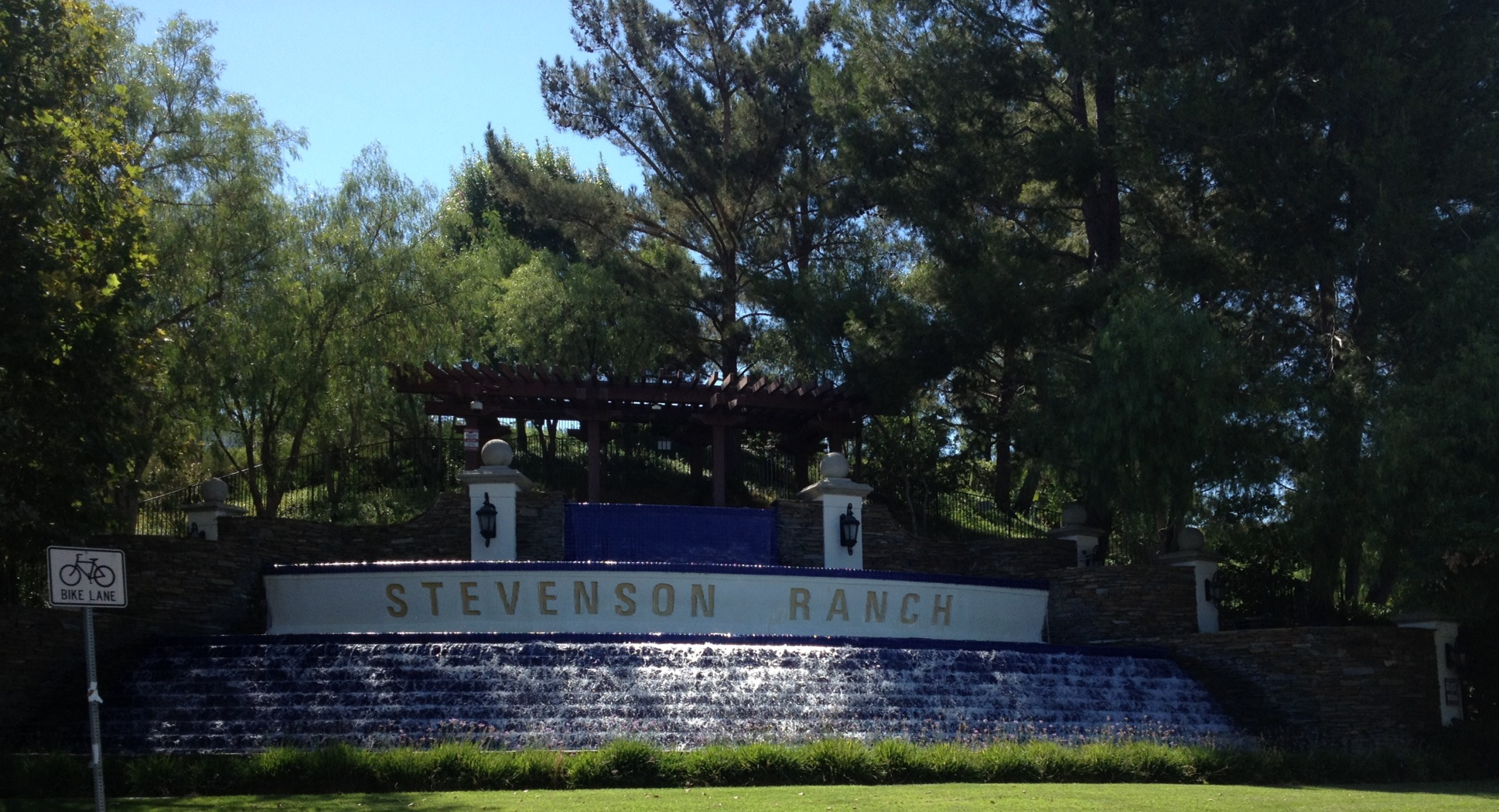
Stevenson Ranch, California, a filming location for Weeds.

Produced by Tilted Productions, in association with Lionsgate Television, the show is inspired by crime series, such as The Shield and The Sopranos, in the sense of an antihero serving as the protagonist while retaining an individual moral code, which usually goes against the norms of society. The title, according to Kohan, refers "to a lot of things", including marijuana and widow's weeds; however, it mainly alludes to "hardy plants struggling to survive". While the lyrics of the opening song from seasons one to three, and eight satirizes the cheap nature of suburban conformity, the show satirizes off-color characters struggling with faux suburban reality, in which everything is "all style, no substance". According to Kohan, she first pitched the series to HBO, which dismissed it. Robert Greenblatt invested in the show before it was commissioned by Showtime.

Showrunner and head writer Jenji Kohan, whose credits include Tracey Takes On..., Mad About You, and Sex and the City, is the executive producer of the series, alongside Roberto Benabib, of Little City fame. Kohan also explains how she and Benabib "tag team[ed]" in running the writers room. Senior writer Matthew Salsberg and director Craig Zisk also joined as executive producers in later seasons. Following Zisk's departure from the series after five seasons, Mark Burley, director Scott Ellis, and Lisa Vinnecour were added on as executive producers. During seasons seven and eight, senior writers Victoria Morrow and Stephen Falk became co-executive producers.

Exterior scenes for the first two seasons were shot almost exclusively in Stevenson Ranch, a suburban area of Santa Clarita Valley, California. The large fountain and Agrestic sign in the opening credits of the first three seasons was shot at the corner of Stevenson Ranch Parkway and Holmes Place. The name "Stevenson Ranch" was digitally replaced with "Agrestic" (and with "Majestic" and "Regrestic" in later episodes). The overhead satellite view in the beginning of the credits in the first three seasons is of Calabasas Hills, a gated community in Calabasas, California. The shot of the It's A Grind coffee shop in the introduction (seasons one to three) is of an It's A Grind in Castaic, California. The show was originally filmed at Red Studios, previously known as Ren-Mar studios. The show moved to Universal Studios in Los Angeles for season seven, where it is noted on the studio tour. A version of this Wikipedia page served as the introduction for the season five episode titled "Where the Sidewalk Ends".

== Synopsis ==
=== Series opening ===
Nancy Botwin is a single mother who lives in Agrestic—a fictional suburb of Los Angeles—with her two children, 15-year-old Silas and 10-year-old Shane, when the series begins. The pilot opens a few months after the untimely death of Nancy's husband Judah, who had a heart attack while jogging with their younger son. Nancy begins selling marijuana to maintain the upper middle-class lifestyle originally provided by her late husband's salary. References to conspicuous consumption are evident from the show's beginning episodes. The opening credits are set to Malvina Reynolds' "Little Boxes" song, which speaks of suburbanites from the same mold, all living the consumerist American dream. Visual and auditory references to designer labels, luxury homes, SUVs, plastic surgery, and expensive sugary drinks point to the consumption habits of the Agrestic characters. Nancy's desire to maintain her comfortable suburban lifestyle is the impetus for her decision to enter the illegal drug business and is another example of extreme consumerism in suburbia. The series follows Nancy's life as she gets drawn into the criminal system, develops a client base, starts a front to hide her selling, creates her own strain of weed called MILF, and relocates her family to stay out of jail and protect her children. Featured in the ensemble cast are her lazy, wisecracking brother-in-law Andy Botwin; foolish acquaintance Doug Wilson; and narcissistic neighbor and PTA mother Celia Hodes.

== Cast and characters ==
The cast of Weeds during Season 2, Left to Right: Romany Malco, Tonye Patano, Mary-Louise Parker, Kevin Nealon, Elizabeth Perkins, and Justin Kirk. This image was also used for the Season 2 DVD box set.

Actor	Role	Seasons							
Actor	Role	1	2	3	4	5	6	7	8
Mary-Louise Parker	Nancy Botwin	Main	Main	Main	Main	Main	Main	Main	Main
Justin Kirk	Andy Botwin	Main	Main	Main	Main	Main	Main	Main	Main
Hunter Parrish	Silas Botwin	Main	Main	Main	Main	Main	Main	Main	Main
Alexander Gould	Shane Botwin	Main	Main	Main	Main	Main	Main	Main	Main
Kevin Nealon	Doug Wilson	Main	Main	Main	Main	Main	Main	Main	Main
Elizabeth Perkins	Celia Hodes	Main	Main	Main	Main	Main			
Romany Malco	Conrad Shepard	Main	Main	Main					Guest
Tonye Patano	Heylia James	Main	Main	Main				Guest	
Indigo	Vaneeta James	Main	Main	Main					
Renée Victor	Lupita	Main	Main	Guest	Guest	Guest	Guest		Guest
Shoshannah Stern	Megan Graves	Main	Main						Guest
Martin Donovan	Peter Scottson	Guest	Main						
Allie Grant	Isabelle Hodes	Recurring	Recurring	Main	Main	Main			
Andy Milder	Dean Hodes	Recurring	Recurring	Main	Guest	Guest	Guest	Guest	Guest
Fatso-Fasano	Marvin		Guest	Main	Guest				Guest
Page Kennedy	Louis "U-turn" Wardell		Guest	Main					
Matthew Modine	Sullivan Groff			Main					
Jack Stehlin	Captain Roy Till		Recurring	Recurring	Recurring	Recurring			
Enrique Castillo	Cesar de la Cruz				Main	Main	Main		
Hemky Madera	Ignacio Morero Jr.				Main	Main	Main		
Demián Bichir	Esteban Reyes				Main	Main	Guest		
Guillermo Díaz	Guillermo García Gómez			Guest	Main	Guest	Guest		Guest
Mateus Ward; Ethan and Gavin Kent	Stevie Ray Botwin					Main	Main	Main	Main
Kate del Castillo	Pilar Zuazo					Main			
Jennifer Jason Leigh	Jill Price-Grey					Guest	Guest	Main	Main
Rachel Pace	Shayla Grey					Guest		Main	Main
Amanda Pace	Taylor Grey					Guest		Main	Main

The principal character is Nancy Price Botwin (Mary-Louise Parker), a housewife from Southern California who becomes a marijuana dealer after her husband Judah (Jeffrey Dean Morgan) dies. Although her drug-dealing career achieves mixed success, she eventually rises to the highest levels of an international drug-smuggling cartel. Nancy remarries three times during the series. First, she has an under-the-radar wedding with Peter Scottson (Martin Donovan), a DEA agent, who is later killed. In season five, she marries Esteban Reyes (Demián Bichir), the fictional mayor of Tijuana and leader of a cartel, who is murdered by the seventh season. While in prison, Nancy also establishes a long-term relationship with Zoya (Olga Sosnovska), a woman convicted of murdering her own boyfriend. In the series finale, which leaps forward seven years, viewers come to know that Nancy marries Rabbi David Bloom (David Julian Hirsh), who later dies in a car accident.

Throughout most of the show, Nancy shares her house with her brother-in-law Andy Botwin (Justin Kirk). When Andy arrives in Agrestic, he is little more than a fun-loving slacker (albeit a handsome and charming one), and Nancy views him as a burden. Nonetheless, he emerges as the primary father figure in the household; her children adore him, and there is the suggestion that Nancy and her sons view Andy as their last link to Judah. Andy falls in love with Nancy during the fourth season but eventually realizes his feelings are unreciprocated. Nancy tries to balance their relationship to keep him "in the family." When he is not helping Nancy run her household, Andy engages in various educational and business ventures, from studying to be a rabbi in Hebrew school, to marijuana dealer, to entrepreneurial bicycle salesman. He also has a passion for cooking, and he became a professional chef by the sixth season.

Nancy begins the series with two sons, who, after Judah's death, are raised haphazardly. In the fifth season, she has a third son, Stevie Ray Botwin (portrayed by uncredited babies and later by Ethan and Gavin Kent), with Esteban Reyes. Her first son, Silas (Hunter Parrish), who has been sexually active since the show's debut, later follows in his mother's footsteps: he becomes a marijuana dealer, grower, and dispensary operator.

Nancy's younger son, Shane (Alexander Gould), is highly intelligent yet poorly socialized and vulgar; he is deeply affected by his father's death and yearns for more attention from his mother. In the first three seasons, Shane was also frequently bullied in school. After his peers harassed him in the bathroom for his sexual inexperience, his uncle pursues his request in taking him for a handjob at the local massage parlor. He is portrayed as having psychological issues. For instance, just before leaving Agrestic, Shane has conversations with his deceased father. Upon moving to Ren Mar, he loses his virginity and becomes a temporary alcoholic. Shane also engages in violence. Pilar, Esteban's boss and political consultant, arranged for Nancy to be shot—an awry attempt that inadvertently wounded Shane's arm instead. Later, when Shane overheard his mother's hostile conversation with Pilar, who threatened his and Silas' lives, he murdered Pilar by abruptly striking her over the head with a croquet mallet, causing her body to collapse into the pool. By the seventh season, he joins the police academy before receiving his criminal justice degree — working for the New York City Police Department in season eight.

Celia Hodes (Elizabeth Perkins) is Nancy's "frenemy". Obsessed with her personal image, she manipulates those around her who do not fit neatly into that image. She is unhappily married to Dean (Andy Milder), whom she regards as a "loser asshole"; they later divorce. Other characters also dislike her. Celia's older daughter, Quinn (Haley Hudson), kidnaps her as revenge for shipping her to a reform school in Mexico. She is also demanding over her younger daughter Isabelle's (Allie Grant) "weight problem," and disapproves of her being a lesbian. Later, Celia is diagnosed with breast cancer and cured with chemotherapy. In the second season, she appeared at Nancy's house holding a gun, which she test shot at her kitchen cabinets. Celia was planning to shoot Doug Wilson at their children's elementary school graduation, but ran out of bullets. When interrogated by the police over Nancy's grow house in Celia's home burning down the city, Dean, Doug, and other characters falsely allege that Celia coordinated it, which leads to her arrest. Following her release from prison, she becomes addicted to cocaine, so Isabelle arranges a rehab home intervention. Celia later becomes envious of Nancy; therefore, she dresses like her. After the fifth season, the actress left to pursue other projects.

Doug Wilson (Kevin Nealon) begins the series as an accountant and city councilman for the town of Agrestic. Doug is friends with many characters in the series including Andy, Dean, and Sanjay Patel (Maulik Pancholy); all four aid Nancy's career as a marijuana dealer. Doug makes mistakes and loses his position; his wife Dana leaves him. He becomes a drifter who follows the Botwins during seasons four through eight. He and the Botwins move to New York City, where he becomes the chief accountant for a Ponzi scheme posing as a hedge fund.

The show has a changing cast of supporting characters. Heylia James (Tonye Patano) and her family — Conrad and Vaneeta, portrayed by Romany Malco and Indigo, respectively — play key roles during the first three seasons. They are wholesalers who supply marijuana to Nancy. Conrad later develops his own strain of marijuana, called MILF weed, which Nancy sells.

Season three features Sullivan Groff (Matthew Modine), an unethical, womanizing real estate developer with big plans for Agrestic. When Nancy moves to Ren Mar, the characters in Esteban's drug cartel—primarily Cesar (Enrique Castillo), Ignacio (Hemky Madera), and Guillermo (Guillermo Díaz), the latter first appearing in the third season—take a leading role. Other key characters include Nancy's housekeeper Lupita (Renée Victor); rival drug dealers; countless law enforcement officials; the romantic interests of Andy, Silas, and Shane; and the residents of Agrestic and Ren Mar.

In the sixth season, Nancy is on the run, and the new characters only have minor roles and appear for only a few episodes. An exception to this is Warren Schiff (Richard Dreyfuss), whom she first met when teaching her math in high school; he becomes infatuated with Nancy. When the Botwins and Doug settle in New York City, new supporting characters are introduced. The family later settles in Nancy's estranged sister Jill's (Jennifer Jason Leigh) house in Connecticut, becoming a regular guest character by the eighth season.

Other recurring characters include Albert Brooks as Nancy's father-in-law Lenny, Carrie Fisher as Celia's lawyer, Dave Thomas as a doctor, Martin Short as a lawyer for Nancy's custody battle, Alanis Morissette as a doctor at an abortion clinic, Zooey Deschanel as Andy's estranged girlfriend, Lee Majors as a border guard, Mary-Kate Olsen as a student who worships Jesus and sells pot, as well as Aidan Quinn, among others.

== Episodes ==
As of September 16, 2012, 102 original episodes had been broadcast. The first season began on August 8, 2005, and consisted of 10 episodes. The second season premiered on August 14, 2006, airing 12 episodes. The third season debuted on August 13, 2007, airing 15 episodes. The fourth season began June 16, 2008, the fifth season on June 8, 2009, and the sixth in August 2010, each with 13 episodes. The seventh season began airing on June 27, 2011, and, as of November 10, 2011, Weeds was renewed for an eighth and final season of 13 episodes that premiered Sunday, July 1, 2012.

In 2006, before Season two's airing, the first few episodes were leaked online. Before the third season began, the first two episodes appeared online on July 22, 2007 (nearly a month before the August 13 premiere date). The third episode appeared online on July 24, 2007, with the fourth appearing just three days later. The fourth episode was, however, an incomplete version—among other things, some dubbed lines were not complete (notably part of a voice mail message by U-Turn is spoken by a distinctly different actor), and a card simply reading "End Credits" was inserted instead of the actual credits. On August 1, 2010, the first episodes of season 6 leaked online. Due to the high quality of the leaked episodes, downloaders of the torrents speculated that they were leaked intentionally to garner interest in the show and to create internet buzz. Episode leaks of other Showtime programs such as Californication and Dexter were seen as giving weight to this theory.

Jenji Kohan has stated that she does not mind episodes being distributed on the internet in this way, saying, "Revenue aside, I don't expect to get rich on Weeds. I'm excited it's out there. Showtime is great, but it does have a limited audience." The show is rated TV-MA for drug content, profanity, nudity, brief violence, and other adult content.

== Media ==
=== Opening music ===
"Little Boxes" is the opening song for the first three seasons. The first season uses the version recorded by its composer Malvina Reynolds. In seasons two and three, the song is performed by various artists. In season four, the Malvina Reynolds version opens the first episode. Thereafter, the original titles and music are replaced by a short clip, different for each episode, that relates to the plot or some scene in the episode. The song is also subtly referenced in the eighth episode of the fourth season when a sleepy Nancy tells Shane that he's going to "...become a doctor or a lawyer or a business executive." In the opening credits of the eighth episode of season seven, a woman is heard humming the tune to "Little Boxes" as she arranges knickknacks on a shelf. In Season eight, the show returns to "Little Boxes" for the opening sequence.

Season 1

- Malvina Reynolds

Season 2

1. Elvis Costello
2. Death Cab for Cutie
3. Engelbert Humperdinck
4. Kate & Anna McGarrigle (in French)
5. Charlie (Charles Phelps) Barnett Jr (maestro; instrumental with orchestra)
6. Aidan Hawken
7. Ozomatli
8. The Submarines
9. Tim DeLaughter of Polyphonic Spree
10. Regina Spektor
11. Jenny Lewis and Johnathan Rice
12. Malvina Reynolds

Season 3

1. Randy Newman
2. Angelique Kidjo
3. Kinky (in Spanish)
4. Donovan
5. Billy Bob Thornton
6. The Shins
7. The Individuals
8. Man Man
9. Joan Baez
10. The Decemberists
11. Michael Franti
12. Persephone's Bees (partly in Russian)
13. Laurie Berkner
14. Linkin Park
15. Malvina Reynolds (opening)
  & Pete Seeger (closing)

Season 8

1. Malvina Reynolds
2. Ben Folds
3. Steve Martin & Kevin Nealon
4. The Bronx
5. The Mountain Goats
6. Bomb the Music Industry!
7. The Womenfolk
8. The Thermals
9. Dierks Bentley
10. Hunter Parrish
11. Aimee Mann
12. Malvina Reynolds (Cut Chemist Remix)

=== Soundtracks ===
The music supervisors for the show include Bruce Gilbert (60 episodes), Gary Calamar (along with music coordinator Alyson Vidoli) (27 episodes) and Amine Ramer (4 episodes). The original score is provided by composers Brandon Jay and Gwendolyn Sanford.

Weeds: Music from the Original Series

- Released September 13, 2005
1. Malvina Reynolds – "Little Boxes"
2. Nellie McKay – "David"
3. Peggy Lee – "A Doodlin' Song"
4. Sufjan Stevens – "All the Trees of the Field Will Clap Their Hands"
5. Michael Franti & Spearhead – "Ganja Babe"
6. All Too Much – "More Than a Friend"
7. Sons & Daughters – "Blood"
8. The New Pornographers – "The Laws Have Changed"
9. Joey Santiago – "Fake Purse"
10. NRBQ – "Wacky Tobacky"
11. Marion Black – "Who Knows"
12. Martin Creed – "I Can't Move"
13. The Mountain Goats – "Cotton"
14. Joey Santiago – "Birthday Video"
15. Flogging Molly – "If I Ever Leave This World Alive"
16. The Be Good Tanyas – "The Littlest Birds"
17. Hill Of Beans – "Satan Lend Me a Dollar"

Weeds: Music from the Original Series, Volume 2

- Released October 17, 2006
1. Elvis Costello – "Little Boxes"
2. Zeroleen – "All Good"
3. Of Montreal – "Wraith Pinned to the Mist and Other Games"
4. Jenny Owen Youngs – "Fuck Was I"
5. Fern Jones – "Strange Things Are Happening"
6. (The Real) Tuesday Weld – "Bathtime in Clerkenwell"
7. Gwendolyn Sanford & Brandon Jay – "Shane Digs Gretchen"
8. Rogue Wave – "Kicking the Heart Out"
9. Regina Spektor – "The Ghost of Corporate Future"
10. Dengue Fever – "One Thousand Tears of a Tarantula"
11. Aidan Hawken – "Neighborhood"
12. Squirrel Nut Zippers – "It Ain't You"
13. Gwendolyn Sanford & Brandon Jay – "From Agrestic to Las Vegas"
14. The 88 – "Not Enough"
15. Sufjan Stevens – "Holland"
16. Gwendolyn Sanford & Brandon Jay – "Huskaroo TV Spot"
17. The Mopes – "You Look Like a Gorilla"

Weeds: Music from the Original Series, Volume 3

- Released June 3, 2008 as digital-only release, retail release July 8.
1. Randy Newman – "Little Boxes"
2. Page France – "Chariot"
3. That 1 Guy – "Buttmachine"
4. Beirut – "Scenic World"
5. The Dresden Dolls – "Girl Anachronism"
6. Ween – "You Fucked Up"
7. Oh No! Oh My! – "Walk in the Park"
8. Illinois – "Nosebleed"
9. Great Lake Swimmers – "Your Rocky Spine"
10. Mr. Smolin – "The Earth Keeps Turning On"
11. Kevin Nealon – "Just Like The Superdome"
12. State Radio – "Keepsake"
13. Eleni Mandell – "Let's Drive Away"
14. The Shins – "Little Boxes" (iTunes Exclusive)

Weeds: Music from the Original Series, Volume 4

- Released June 9, 2009
1. DeVotchKa – "A New World"
2. Nortec Collective – "Tengo La Voz"
3. Greg Weeks – "Made"
4. The Free Design – "Love You"
5. That Handsome Devil – "Mexico"
6. Miss Li – "Don't Try to Fool Me"
7. Tunng – "Bullets"
8. Mucca Pazza – "Borino Oro"
9. Los Mono – "Se Puede"
10. Linus of Hollywood – "Thank You for Making Me Feel Better"
11. The Mountain Goats – "International Small Arms Traffic Blues"
12. Toots & The Maytals – "Celia"
13. Soul Swingers – "Brighter Tomorrow"

=== Home media ===
DVD Name	# of Ep	Release dates		
DVD Name	# of Ep	Region 1	Region 2	Region 4
Season One	10	July 11, 2006	September 3, 2007	July 18, 2007
Season Two	12	July 24, 2007	January 7, 2008	May 28, 2008
Season Three	15	June 3, 2008	May 26, 2008	July 8, 2009
Season Four	13	June 2, 2009	May 30, 2011	March 17, 2010
Season Five	13	January 19, 2010	August 29, 2011	November 24, 2010
Season Six	13	February 22, 2011	April 9, 2012	December 16, 2011
Season Seven	13	February 21, 2012	—N/a	August 8, 2013
Season Eight	13	February 12, 2013	—N/a	March 20, 2014

The Region 1 Season One DVD is only available in 4:3 pan and scan format. The Region 2 and 4 releases are all in anamorphic widescreen. Season one was released on Blu-ray on May 29, 2007, and Season two was released on July 24, 2007. Both seasons include all episodes in 1080p widescreen with Dolby Digital EX sound and either DTS-HD (season one) or LPCM (season two), as well as extras exclusive to the Blu-ray release. Season three was released on Blu-ray on June 3, 2008. Seasons one to three on Blu-ray are multi-region discs; however, season four has been region-locked to region A only.

In late 2009, Weeds seasons four and five have been aired in at least one region B country, namely The Netherlands. Subsequently, a region 2 DVD of Season 4 has indeed been released. However, the region 2 DVD release was not accompanied by a region B Blu-ray. Showtime has not commented on whether they ever anticipate releasing a region B Blu-ray version, or if any further non-US transmission rights are agreed. The same region locking has been applied to Blu-ray for season five. In November 2011, Seasons 2–5 were released on Region B Blu-ray in Australia, with Season 6 Region B Blu-ray released December 16, 2011. Blu-ray season seven is now available.

An extra feature on the Season Two DVD (a marijuana-based cooking show parody) was rejected by the British Board of Film Classification since it was regarded as "likely [...] to promote and encourage the use of illegal drugs".

=== Books ===
On August 7, 2007, Simon Spotlight, a division of Simon and Schuster, published In the Weeds: The Official Guide to the Showtime Series by Kera Bolonik, which features interviews with the series creator/showrunner, its other writer-producers, and the entire cast. It also features detailed character and plot descriptions, recipes, trivia and behind-the-scenes information.

== Reception ==
In its first year, Weeds was Showtime's highest rated series. The season four premiere attracted 1.3 million viewers to Showtime, the channel's then-highest-ever viewership; the season as a whole averaged 962,000 viewers.

As the season three began in fall 2007, Slate named Nancy Botwin as one of the best characters on television. TIME magazine's James Poniewozik ranked Weeds #9 among the Top 10 Returning Series of 2007. The New York Times opined the show is "transforming for Showtime." Metacritic scored season two 78 out of 100, season four 67 out of 100, and season five 73 out of 100.

=== Critical reception ===
Critical response of Weeds
Series	Rotten Tomatoes	Metacritic
1	79% (28 reviews)	71 (85 reviews)
2	100% (15 reviews)	78 (16 reviews)
3	88% (16 reviews)	82 (12 reviews)
4	60% (10 reviews)	67 (10 reviews)
5	62% (13 reviews)	67 (5 reviews)
6	64% (11 reviews)	56 (4 reviews)
7	73% (11 reviews)	68 (5 reviews)
8	40% (10 reviews)	57 (4 reviews)

The first season received mostly positive reviews from critics. Metacritic rated it 70 out of 100, based on the opinions of 29 critics. The second season achieved a Metacritic rating of 78 out of 100, based on 16 critics, and the third season reached a series-high score of 82 out of 100, based on 12 critics. The critical reviews dipped after season three, reaching a low Metacritic rating of 56 out of 100 (based on 4 critics) for season six.

=== Awards and nominations ===
Award	Title	Credit	Year
Satellite Awards	Actress in a Series, Comedy or Musical	Mary-Louise Parker	2005
Golden Globe Awards	Best Performance by a TV Actress in a Musical or Comedy	Mary-Louise Parker	2006
Writers Guild of America	Episodic Comedy	Jenji Kohan, Creator/Executive Producer	2006
Young Artist Awards	Best Supporting Young Actor – Television Series	Alexander Gould	2006
Satellite Awards	Actor in a Series, Comedy or Musical	Justin Kirk	2008
Emmy Awards	Outstanding Cinematography for a Half-Hour Series	Michael Trim, Director of Photography	2010

Nominations

Emmy Awards

- Outstanding Supporting Actress in a Comedy Series Elizabeth Perkins (2006, 2007, 2009)
- Outstanding Directing for a Comedy Series Craig Zisk, for the episode "Good Shit Lollipop" (2006)
- Outstanding Casting for a Comedy Series (2006, 2007)
- Outstanding Main Title Design (2006)
- Outstanding Single-Camera Picture Editing for a Comedy Series, for the episode "Good Shit Lollipop" (2006)
- Outstanding Lead Actress in a Comedy Series Mary-Louise Parker (2007, 2008, 2009)
- Outstanding Single-Camera Picture Editing for a Comedy Series, for the episode "Mrs. Botwin's Neighborhood" (2007)
- Outstanding Single-Camera Picture Editing for a Comedy Series, for the episode "Crush Girl Love Panic" (2007)
- Outstanding Comedy Series (2009)

Golden Globes

- Best TV Series-Comedy (2006, 2007, 2009)
- Best Actress in a Supporting Role in a Series, Mini-series, or TV Movie Elizabeth Perkins (2006): Best Performance by a TV Supporting Actress Elizabeth Perkins (2006, 2007)
- Best Performance by a TV Actress in a Musical or Comedy Mary-Louise Parker (2005, 2007, 2008)
- Best Performance by a TV Supporting Actor Justin Kirk (2007)

Screen Actors Guild

- Outstanding Performance by a Female Actor in a Comedy Series Mary-Louise Parker (2006, 2007, 2008, 2009)
- Ensemble In A Comedy Series (2007, 2009)

Satellite Awards

- Outstanding Actress in a Series-Comedy Elizabeth Perkins (2005)
- Best Actress in a Supporting Role in a Series, Mini-series, or TV Movie Elizabeth Perkins (2006)
- Best Actress in a Series, Comedy or Musical Mary-Louise Parker (2006, 2008)
- Best Actor in a Supporting Role in a Series, Mini-Series, or TV Movie Justin Kirk (2007)
- Best Television Series, Comedy or Musical (2007, 2008)

== Sequel ==
In November 2019, Variety reported that a sequel series was in development at Starz, titled Weeds 4.20. The series was to feature Mary-Louise Parker and Elizabeth Perkins reprising their roles with the story set 10 years after the conclusion of the original series. Victoria Morrow, who was a producer on the writing team for Weeds, was set to return as writer and executive producer on the spin-off series, while Kohan was not confirmed to be involved.

In May 2023, Deadline reported again that Parker was attached to star in and executive produce a Weeds project, now moved back to Showtime. Responding to the rumors, Parker told The Guardian, "every time I ask, it seems to be closer [...] but because of the strike, we don't know". Justin Kirk expressed doubt on the sequel's future in a separate interview in Variety, saying "do you really want to see us all old and coming back?"

== See also ==
- Breaking Bad
- Ideal (TV series)
- Top Buzzer
