= The Individuals (Chicago band) =

American hip hop group

The Individuals are a Chicago based Rap/Hip hop/Reggae band. Ando Tha Don, Big Lou, Raw Bizness, and T.C.O. are the current members of what started as a six-member act. Their record label is Rule the World Records.

The band's music was used in the second and third seasons of the Showtime series Weeds, leading to the band performing the show's theme song "Little Boxes" for a third-season episode.

The Individuals are part of the 420 sub culture, and they have won eleven Marijuana Music Awards.

== Discography ==
- Something To Smoke To (2003)
- Something To Smoke To 2 (2006)
