= Devon Shepard =

American television writer and producer

- Occupation(s): Television producer and writer
- Years active: 1992–present

Devon K. Shepard is an American television writer and producer. His television credits, include Weeds, Everybody Hates Chris, One on One, All About the Andersons, Cedric the Entertainer Presents, The Wayans Bros., MADtv, The Fresh Prince of Bel-Air, Crash and among other series.
