= Victoria Morrow =

American television writer and producer

- Occupation: Television Writer
- Writing career
- Notable works: Deadwood; Weeds

Victoria Morrow is an American television writer and producer. She has been nominated for two Writers Guild of America Awards for her work on Deadwood and Weeds.

== Biography ==
Morrow joined the crew of HBO Western drama Deadwood as a writer for the second season in 2005. The series was created by David Milch and focuses on the growth of a settlement in the American West. Morrow wrote the episode "Complications". Morrow and the writing staff were nominated for a Writers Guild of America (WGA) Award for Outstanding Drama Series at the February 2006 ceremony for their work on the second season.

Morrow became a staff writer for the third season of Showtime comedy Weeds in 2007. Morrow wrote the episodes "Roy Till Called" and "The Dark Time". Morrow became a story editor for the fourth season in 2008. She wrote the episodes "Lady's a Charm" and "The Love Circle Overlap". Morrow and the writing staff were nominated for the WGA Award for Outstanding Comedy Series at the February 2009 ceremony for their work on the fourth season. Morrow became a co-producer for the fifth season in 2009. She wrote the episode "Machetes Up Top".

Morrow also wrote for the HBO polygamy drama Big Love in 2009. She wrote the teleplay for the third-season episode "Sacrament" from a story by Coleman Herbert.

== Filmography ==
Production staff

Year	Show	Role	Notes
2011	Weeds	Co-executive producer / writer	Season 8
2010	Weeds	Supervising producer / writer	Season 6 - 7
2009	Weeds	Co-producer / writer	Season 5
2008	Weeds	Story editor / writer	Season 4
2007	Weeds	Staff writer	Season 3

Writer

Year	Show	Season	Episode title	Episode	Notes
2009	Big Love	3	"Sacrament"	10	
2009	Weeds	5	"Machetes Up Top"	2	
2008	Weeds	4	"The Love Circle Overlap"	10	
2008	Weeds	4	"Lady's a Charm"	2	
2007	Weeds	3	"The Dark Time"	12	
2007	Weeds	3	"Roy Till Called"	10	
2005	Deadwood	2	"Complications"	5	
