= Fatso-Fasano =

American film, television actor and musician

- Born: Terrell Joseph Ramsey; January 26, 1979 (age 47); Los Angeles, California, U.S.
- Occupations: Actor, musician
- Years active: 2003–present

Fatso-Fasano (born Terrell Joseph Ramsey; on January 26, 1979) is an American actor and musician. He is perhaps best known for playing Marvin on the television series Weeds from 2006 to 2012.

== Selected Filmography ==
=== Film ===
Year	Title	Role	Notes
2003	The Beat	Greyton	Supporting role
2006	John Tucker Must Die	Tommy	Supporting role
2006	Rockin' Meera	Shorty	Supporting role
2006	The Black Dahlia	Dealer	Supporting role
2006	Price to Pay	Boger	Supporting role
2008	Soul Men	Bay-Bay	Supporting role

=== Television ===
Year	Title	Role	Notes
2003	The Handler	Bouncer #1	Episode: "Street Boss"
2004	NYPD Blue	Jamal	Episode: "The Vision Thing"
2005	CSI: Crime Scene Investigation	the Pretzel Vendor	Episode: "Dog Eat Dog"
2005	Everybody Hates Chris	the Pretzel Vendor	Episode: "Everybody Hates Halloween"
2006-2012	Weeds	Marvin	Recurring role
2008	Welcome to the Captain	Bouncer #1	Episode: "The Wrecking Crew"
