= Andy Milder =

American actor (born 1969)

- Born: August 16, 1969 (age 57); Omaha, Nebraska, U.S.
- Education: University of California, Berkeley
- Occupation: Actor
- Years active: 1991–present
- Spouse: Betty Lee
- Milder's voice recorded February 2014

Andy Milder (born August 16, 1969) is an American actor.

== Career ==
Milder has appeared in such films as Apollo 13, Armageddon, Rumor Has It…, Frost/Nixon, Transformers, and Domino. He was a series regular on Fame L.A. and Weeds, and appeared on such shows as Star Trek: Voyager, Star Trek: Deep Space Nine, The West Wing, Six Feet Under, Ugly Betty, Boston Legal, Parks and Recreation, Married... with Children, The Wonder Years, Private Practice, and Criminal Minds. Milder provided narration for Ballroom Bootcamp, 101 Most Starlicious Make-Overs, Wrecks to Riches, and Lost Gold of World War II. He provided the voice of Lightning Lad in the 2006 animated series Legion of Super Heroes and the film Lego DC Comics Super Heroes: Justice League: Cosmic Clash. From 2005 to 2009, he was a recurring cast member and later series regular on Weeds as Dean Hodes. Starting in 2011, he was a recurring cast member on the Disney Channel sitcom Austin & Ally as Lester Dawson. He also had an appearance on the show Royal Pains on the USA Network as well as Rizzoli & Isles on TNT.

== Personal life ==
Milder was born in Omaha, Nebraska. He moved to Santa Monica, California, at a young age and attended the University of California, Berkeley, majoring in Economics before studying at the American Conservatory Theater in San Francisco. Milder lives in Manhattan Beach, California, with his wife Betty Lee.

== Filmography ==
=== Television ===
Year	Title	Role	Notes
1991	Empty Nest	Vet Assistant	Episode: "The Dreyfuss Affair"
1992	Married... with Children	Francis	Episode: "Frat Chance"
1993	The Wonder Years	Howie Needleman	2 episodes
1994	Murphy Brown	Santa	Episode: "Brown in Toyland"
1995	University Hospital	Howard Stenecki	Episode: "Shadow of a Doubt"
1995	Santo Bugito	Surfer Dude, Young Bug	Voice, episode: "Swiped"
1996	NYPD Blue	Skater	Episode: "Ted and Carey's Bogus Adventure"
1996	Boston Common	Milder	Episode: "Arts and Craftiness"
1996	The Oz Kids	Scarecrow, Sr., additional voices	Voice
1997	Star Trek: Deep Space Nine	Boq'ta	Episode: "Empok Nor"
1997–1998	Fame L.A.	Marcus Carilli	21 episodes
1998	From the Earth to the Moon	Guido	2 episodes
1998	Brother's Keeper	Calvin Heinberg	Episode: "The Note"
1999	G vs E	Scott	Episode: "To Be or Not to Be Evil"
1999	Godzilla: The Series	Archaeologist	Voice, episode: "Protector"
2000	Becker	Clark	Episode: "Beckerethics"
2001	Star Trek: Voyager	Nar	Episode: "Renaissance Man"
2001	Dharma & Greg	Russell Gotleib	2 episodes
2001	The Huntress	Salesman	Episode: "D&B, Inc."
2000–2003	The West Wing	Mark	3 episodes
2003	Yes, Dear	Harold Nicholson	Episode: "Dominic's Buddy"
2005	House	Bus Driver	Episode: "Poison"
2005	CSI: NY	Truman Jafari	Episode: "Til Death Do We Part"
2005	Medium	Mr. Beauchamp	Episode: "Penny for Your Thoughts"
2005	Six Feet Under	Julio's Principal	Episode: "Eat a Peach"
2005	Ballroom Bootcamp	Narrator	7 episodes
2006	Drake & Josh	Mr. Talbot	Episode: "Little Sibling"
2006	Joey	Trent	Episode: "Joey and the Critic"
2006	Ugly Betty	Lawyer	Episode: "Trust, Lust, and Must"
2006	7th Heaven	Sales Clerk	Episode: "Thanks and Giving"
2006–2008	Legion of Super Heroes	Garth Ranzz / Lightning Lad	Voice, 24 episodes
2007–2008	Private Practice	Doug Adams	2 episodes
2009	Trust Me	EmCee	Episode: "But Wait, There's More"
2010–2011	Parks and Recreation	Fred	4 episodes
2010–2011	The Middle	Principal Sholin	2 episodes
2011	The Closer	Owen Doyle	Episode: "To Serve with Love"
2009–2011	Batman: The Brave and the Bold	Jay Garrick / Flash	Voice, 4 episodes
2011	Criminal Minds	Cy Bradstone	Episode: "Proof"
2012	The Mentalist	Dr. Leopold Scheck	Episode: "Ruddy Cheeks"
2012	Royal Pains	Dr. Tom Fanci	Episode: "Manimal"
2005–2012	Weeds	Dean Hodes	58 episodes
2013	Grey's Anatomy	Dr. Darryl Nessbaum	Episode: "Bad Blood"
2013	Generator Rex	John Scarecrow	Voice, episode: "Mind Games"
2011–2015	Austin & Ally	Lester Dawson	17 episodes
2015	NCIS	Gene Isaacson	Episode "Check"
2015	Rosewood	Howard Godfrey	Episode: "Benzodiazepine & the Benjamins"
2015	Rizzoli & Isles	Dr. Kevin Foley	Episode: "Bad Seed Grows"
2015	Bones	Glen Carter	Episode: "The Cowboy in the Contest"
2015–2017	Transformers: Robots in Disguise	Quillfire, additional voices	Voice, 6 episodes
2017	Lucifer	Judd	Episode: "Vegas With Some Radish"
2018	Chicken Girls	Edward / Flash's Dad	6 episodes
2020	Animaniacs	Steven Spielberg, Teamster #2, Knight #1	Voice, 3 episodes
2023–present	Spidey and His Amazing Friends	Ben Grimm / The Thing	Voice, recurring role

=== Film ===
Year	Title	Role	Notes
1991	For the Boys	Dressing Room Page	
1994	I'll Do Anything	Warm-Up Man	
1994	I Love Trouble	Copy Man	
1995	Apollo 13	Guido White	
1997	The Brave Little Toaster to the Rescue	Ratso	Voice, direct-to-video
1998	The Brave Little Toaster Goes to Mars	Ratso	Voice, direct-to-video
1998	Armageddon	NASA Tech	
2000	Luck Wof the Draw	Pascal	
2001	The Hollywood Sign	Studio Executive	
2002	Project Viper	Chambers	
2005	Love for Rent	Paramedic	
2005	Domino	FBI Agent	
2005	Rumor Has It	Conference Attendee	
2007	Transformers	R&D Team Leader	
2008	Frost/Nixon	Frank Gannon	
2008	Seven Pounds	George's Doctor	
2009	Stolen	William Daniels	
2010	Screwball: The Ted Whitfield Story	Rick Brumfield	
2010	Ashley's Ashes	Perry	
2011	Monster of the House	Doc	Television film
2011	The Artist	Director #2	
2011	Rock the House	Ronny	Television film
2016	Lego DC Comics Super Heroes: Justice League – Cosmic Clash	Garth Ranzz / Lightning Lad	Voice, direct-to-video
2017	Tour de Pharmacy		Television film
2018	Con Man	Mr. Hall	

=== Video games ===
Year	Title	Role	Note
2003	Star Trek: Elite Force II	Chell	
2004	Vampire: The Masquerade – Bloodlines	Sebastian LaCroix	
2005	SWAT 4	Warren Rooney, James Bettencourt Jr., Male Hostage	
2009	G.I. Joe: The Rise of Cobra	Sgt. Flash	
2010	Batman: The Brave and the Bold – The Videogame	Jay Garrick / Flash	
