= Renée Victor =

American actress (1938–2025)

- Born: July 25, 1938; San Antonio, Texas, U.S.
- Died: May 30, 2025 (aged 86); Los Angeles, California, U.S.
- Occupations: Actress; dance instructor; singer
- Years active: 1982–2025

Renée Victor (July 25, 1938 – May 30, 2025) was an American actress, dance instructor and singer. She was best known for her role as Lupita on Weeds and providing the voice of female Argonians in Bethesda Softworks' 2011 video game The Elder Scrolls V: Skyrim.

== Life and career ==
Victor was born in San Antonio, Texas on July 25, 1938. She moved to Los Angeles in the 1960s, where she sang for prominent bandleaders who spearheaded the popularity of Latin music in the U.S., including Xavier Cugat and Perez Prado. She was also a dance instructor, teaching salsa and tango. She met her husband through dance classes. She and her husband traveled globally to perform together under the banner "Ray & Renée" — nicknamed the Latin Sonny & Cher — from 1963 to 1973.

She appeared in the 2014 film, Paranormal Activity: The Marked Ones. Her previous work includes a recurring role in 2004 on ER, and a guest role on a 2010 episode of Childrens Hospital. In 2020 and 2021, she appeared in the TNT show Snowpiercer while working with actors such as Daveed Diggs.

In 2017, Victor voiced Miguel's stern Abuelita Elena in the Disney–Pixar animated film Coco.

Victor died of lymphoma at her home in Sherman Oaks, on May 30, 2025, at the age of 86.

== Filmography ==
=== Film ===
Year	Title	Role
1988	Salsa	Aunt / Featured Dancer
1991	The Doctor	Lucy
1995	Steal Big Steal Little	Ranchhand Wife
1997	The Apostle	Latin Translator
1998	The Prophecy II	Nana
1998	The Wonderful Ice Cream Suit	Grandmother
1999	My Brother the Pig	Grandma Berta
2001	Island Prey	Yolanda
2002	Never Trust a Serial Killer	Lupe
2002	Assassination Tango	Stella
2004	Prospect	Abuela
2006	Hot Tamale	Mama
2006	Hollywood Familia	Mommee
2009	Confessions of a Shopaholic	Bag Lady
2009	Stuntmen	Juanita Villareal
2010	Boyle Heights	Gloria
2011	Wake	Mama Chelo
2013	A Night in Old Mexico	Josefina Nelly
2014	Paranormal Activity: The Marked Ones	Irma Arista
2017	Coco	Abuelita (voice)
2018	Superfly	Esmeralda Gonzalez
2020	In Other Words	Regina Aragon
2021	Green Ghost and the Masters of the Stone	Nana
2021	Welcome to Our World	Connie
2021	Unknown Dimension: The Story of Paranormal Activity	Herself
2023	Moe	Mother

=== Television ===
Year	Title	Role	Notes
1983–1985	Hotel	Chambermaid	3 episodes
1984	Masquerade	Guard #2	Episode: "Five Days"
1985	Scarecrow and Mrs. King	Carmen Valdez	Episode: "Ship of Spies"
1985	George Burns Comedy Week	Various roles	2 episodes
1987	Matlock	Maid	Episode: "The Gambler"
1992–1993	The Addams Family	Additional voices	21 episodes
1993	Bob	Yolanda	Episode: "La Sorpresa"
1996	The Parent 'Hood	Principal	2 episodes
1996	Men Behaving Badly	Estelle	Episode: "Drunken Proposal"
1997	The Tony Danza Show	Lydia Cruz	Episode: "A Marriage Made in Miami"
1998	Team Knight Rider	Rosa Bracco	Episode: "Spy Girls"
2000	That's Life	Seamstress	Episode: "The Tell-Tale Uterus"
2001	Strong Medicine	Isabel Santana	Episode: "History"
2003	Mister Sterling	Gloria Lopez	Episode: "Game Time"
2004	ER	Florina Lopez	6 episodes
2005–2012	Weeds	Lupita	22 episodes
2006	All You've Got	Grandmother Rosa	Television film
2007	Women's Murder Club	Carazon	Episode: "No Opportunity Necessary"
2007	Good Morning Agrestic	Lupita	Episode: "Our Borders"
2008–2009	Tyler Perry's House of Payne	Consuela Hernandez	6 episodes
2010	Childrens Hospital	Gladys	Episode: "I See Her Face Everywhere"
2014	Major Crimes	Regina Lopez	Episode: "Personal Day"
2014	Witches of East End	Alma	2 episodes
2017	The Super Man	Anita's Grandmother	5 episodes
2018–2019	Vida	Doña Tita	4 episodes
2020	Gentefied	Ofelia	Episode: "The Mural"
2020	All Rise	Lupita	3 episodes
2020–2021	Snowpiercer	Mama Grandé	11 episodes
2020–2021	Victor and Valentino	Dolores Del Rey (voice)	2 episodes
2020–2022	Dead to Me	Flo Gutierrez	3 episodes
2021	Fairfax	Gloria (voice)	Episode: "Fairfolks"
2021–2023	With Love	Marta Delgado	8 episodes
2022	Undone	Abuelita Fabiola	2 episodes
2022	Mayans M.C.	Sister Teresa	3 episodes
2023	A Million Little Things	Inez	2 episodes
2024–2026	Futurama	Abuelatron (voice)	2 episodes
