= Allie Grant =

American film and television actress (born 1994)

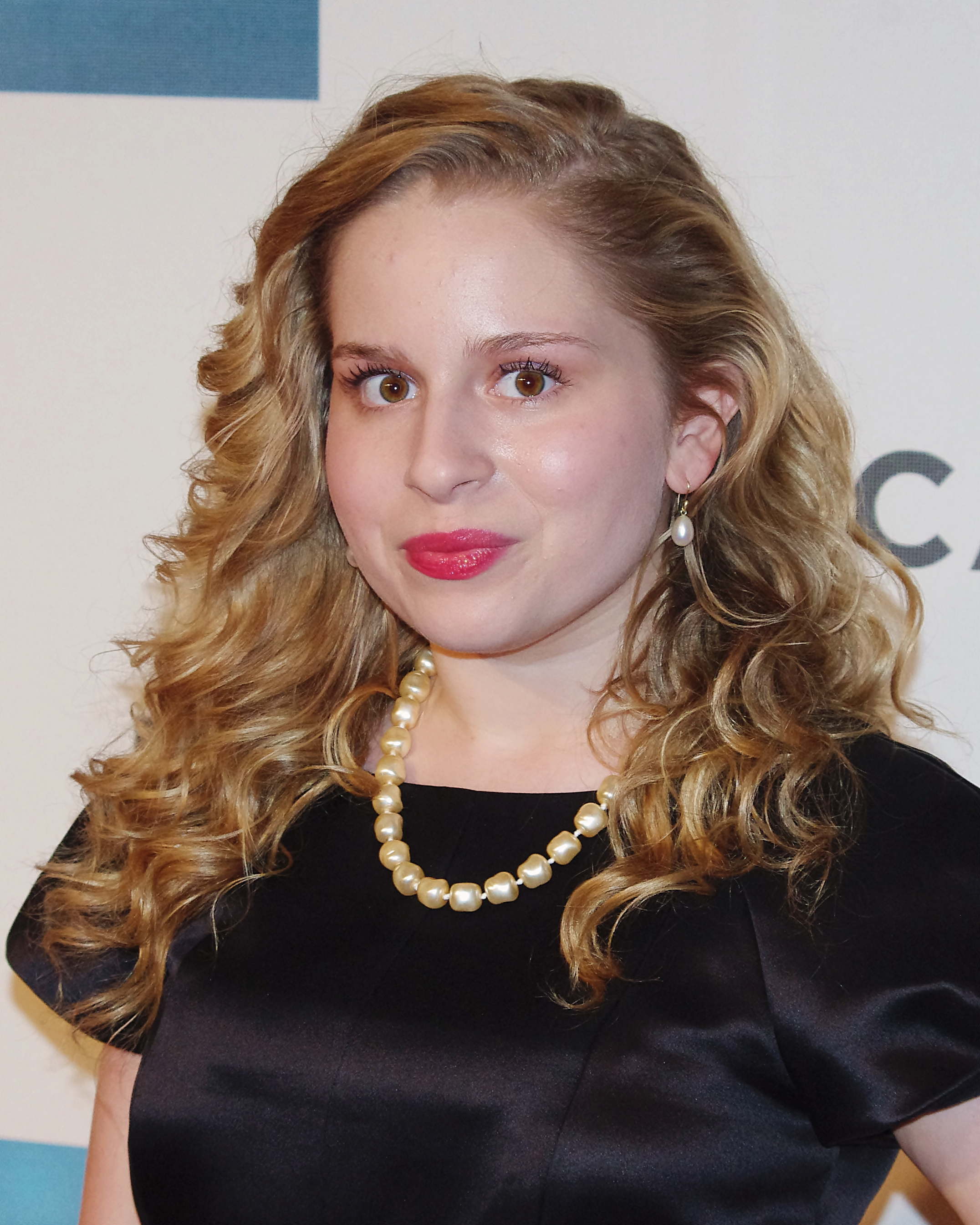
- Grant in 2012
- Born: February 14, 1994 (age 32); Tupelo, Mississippi, U.S.
- Occupation: Actress
- Years active: 2005–present
- Parent(s): Jerry McClain & Angie and Bob Grant

Allie Grant McClain (born February 14, 1994) is an American film and television actress. She is best known for playing Isabelle Hodes on the Showtime television series Weeds appearing in the series from 2005 to 2009. She co-starred as Lisa Shay on the ABC sitcom Suburgatory. She had a recurring role on The Goldbergs. She also appeared in Private Practice and Grey's Anatomy.

== Life and career ==
Grant was born in Tupelo, Mississippi;

In 2005, she was cast in Weeds. Although she originally began as a recurring character, Grant's role was promoted and by season three she became a regular part of the cast. Her role as Isabelle Hodes, the lesbian daughter of Celia and Dean Hodes, earned her a SAG nomination as a part of the Weeds cast.

Grant has also appeared in the films Fanboys (2009), The Runaways (2010) and Struck by Lightning (2012).

== Filmography ==
=== Film ===
Year	Title	Role	Notes
2009	Fanboys	Kimmy/Rogue Leader	
2010	The Runaways	Club Girl	
2012	Struck by Lightning	Remy	
2015	The Red Thunder	Sarah Thun	Short film

=== Television ===
Year	Title	Role	Notes
2005	That's So Raven	Carly	Episode: "Goin' Hollywood"
2005–2009	Weeds	Isabelle Hodes	Recurring role (seasons 1–2), Main role (seasons 3–5); 57 episodes
2006–2007	The Suite Life of Zack & Cody	Agnes	4 episodes
2010	Private Practice	Julie	Episode: "Can't Find My Way Back Home"
2011–2014	Suburgatory	Lisa Shay	Main Role; 52 episodes
2014	Red Band Society	Lauren	Episode: "Know Thyself"
2015	Grey's Anatomy	Alana	Episodes: "How to Save a Life" and "She's Leaving Home: Part 1"
2015–2018	The Goldbergs	Evelyn Silver	10 episodes
2018	All Night	Melinda Weems	Main role; 9 episodes
2019	Schooled	Evelyn Silver	Episode: "Lainey and Erica's High School Reunion"

== Awards ==
Awards and nominations
Year	Award	Category	Title of work	Result
2007	Young Artist Award	Best Performance in a TV Movie (Comedy or Drama): Supporting Young Actor	Weeds	Nominated
2008	Screen Actors Guild Awards	Outstanding Performance by an Ensemble in a Comedy Series	Weeds	Nominated
