= Alexander Gould =

American actor (born 1994)

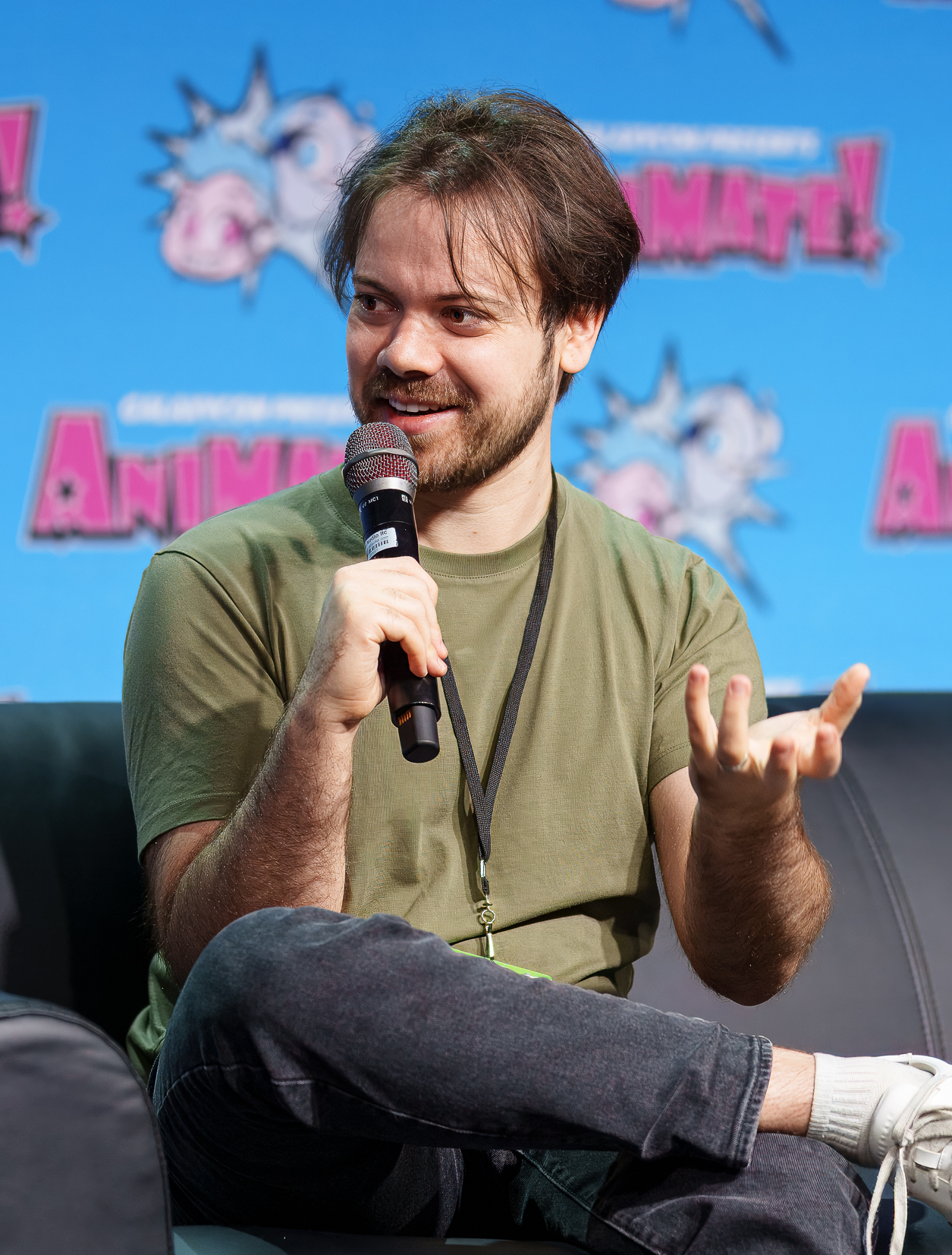
- Gould in 2025 at Animate! Orlando
- Born: Alexander Jerome Gould; May 4, 1994 (age 32); Los Angeles, California, U.S.
- Education: Brandeis University
- Occupation: Actor
- Years active: 1996–present
- Known for: Voice of Nemo in Finding Nemo
- Television: Shane Botwin in Weeds
- Spouse: Lieba Hall (m. 2018)
- Relatives: Kelly Gould (sister)

Alexander Jerome Gould (born May 4, 1994) is an American actor. He is known for voicing the title character of the Pixar animated film Finding Nemo and for his portrayal of Shane Botwin on the Showtime drama series Weeds, the latter of which earned him two Screen Actors Guild Award nominations.

== Early and personal life ==
Gould was born Alexander Jerome Gould on May 4, 1994, in Los Angeles, California. His younger sisters Emma and Kelly were actresses. Gould’s family is Jewish, and was active in the Conservative Jewish youth group United Synagogue Youth.

Following filming of the final season of Weeds in Spring 2012, Gould participated in Nativ, a gap year program, and lived in Israel for almost a year, then went to college at Clark University in 2013. Gould later transferred to Brandeis University, and graduated from there in 2017 with a dual major in philosophy and politics.

Gould married Lieba Hall in June 2018. They live in Los Angeles.

== Career ==
His acting career began when he was two years old. He had small roles in the late 1990s and early 2000s on many television shows that were popular at the time. At age nine, he won the eponymous role in Finding Nemo. He then played David Collins in the remake of the soap opera Dark Shadows, but the pilot episode was rejected by The WB.

From ages ten to eighteen, Gould was part of the cast of Weeds on Showtime. He starred in all eight seasons as Shane Botwin. For his role, he was nominated twice for Outstanding Performance by an Ensemble in a Comedy Series at the SAG Awards. During his tenure, he also had guest roles in other shows, was part of the ensemble cast of the 2006 film How to Eat Fried Worms, and voiced Bambi in Bambi II.

In 2012, Gould stepped away from his acting career to attend college, among other pursuits. He had two small voice acting roles during this period, Jimmy Olsen in the 2013 animated film Superman: Unbound and a cameo in 2016's Finding Dory. In 2018, he joined the Abrams Acting Agency.

== Filmography ==
=== Film ===
Year	Title	Role	Notes
1998	City of Angels	Little Boy	Uncredited
2000	Mexico City	Peter Cobb	
2002	They	Young Billy	
2003	Finding Nemo	Nemo (voice)	
2003	Exploring the Reef with Jean-Michel Cousteau	Nemo (voice)	Short
2006	Bambi II	Bambi (voice)	Direct-to-video
2006	Curious George	Kid (voice)	
2006	How to Eat Fried Worms	Twitch	
2007	The Librarian from the Black Lagoon	Hubie/Narrator (voice)	Short
2013	Superman: Unbound	Jimmy Olsen (voice)	Direct-to-video
2016	Finding Dory	Passenger Carl (voice)	

=== Television ===
Year	Title	Role	Notes
1996	Bailey Kipper's P.O.V.	Young Bailey Kipper	Episode: "Teacher, Teacher"
2000	Freaks and Geeks	Ronnie	Episode: "Chokin' and Tokin"
2000	Malcolm in the Middle	Egg	Episode: "Funeral"
2000	The Geena Davis Show	Sam	Episode: "Cooties"
2001	Ally McBeal	Ben	2 episodes
2001	7th Heaven	Pee Wee #1	Episode: "Apologize"
2001	The Day the World Ended	Young Ben	Television film
2001	Family Law	Josh Deverell	Episode: "Angel's Flight"
2002	Even Stevens	Grayson	Episode: "Little Mr. Sacktown"
2002	Boomtown	Tom at 8	Episode: "Reelin' in the Years"
2004	Dark Shadows	David Collins	Unaired television pilot
2004	Oliver Beene	Young Ted	Episode: "Soup to Nuts"
2005–12	Weeds	Shane Botwin	102 episodes
2005	Duck Dodgers	Boy / Young Son (voices)	2 episodes
2007	Criminal Minds	Jeremy Jacobs	Episode: "Seven Seconds"
2008	Law & Order: Special Victims Unit	Jack Tremblay	Episode: "Unorthodox"
2008	Pushing Daisies	Elliott McQuoddy	Episode: "The Legend of Merle McQuoddy"
2009	Supernatural	Cole Griffiths	Episode: "Death Takes a Holiday"
2010	The Life & Times of Tim	Boy Scout (voice)	Episode: "The Girl Scout Incident/Rodney Has a Wife?"

== Awards and nominations ==
Year	Association	Category	Work	Result
2004	Online Film & Television Association Awards	Best Voice-Over Performance	Finding Nemo	Won
2004	Young Artist Awards	Best Performance in a Voice Over Role – Young Actor	Finding Nemo	Won
2007	Screen Actors Guild Awards	Outstanding Performance by an Ensemble in a Comedy Series	Weeds	Nominated
2007	Young Artist Awards	Best Performance in a TV Series – Supporting Young Actor	Weeds	Won
2007	Young Artist Awards	Best Young Ensemble in a Feature Film	How to Eat Fried Worms	Won
2008	Young Artist Awards	Best Performance in a TV Series – Supporting Young Actor	Weeds	Nominated
2009	Screen Actors Guild Awards	Outstanding Performance by an Ensemble in a Comedy Series	Weeds	Nominated
