= Langston Kerman =

American actor and comedian (born 1987)

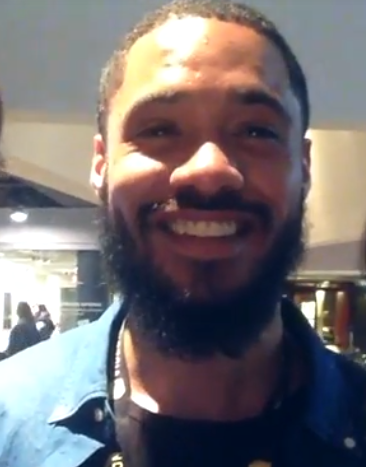
- Kerman at the 2015 Just for Laughs comedy festival
- Born: April 23, 1987 (age 39)
- Education: University of Michigan (BA); Boston University (MFA)
- Occupations: Comedian; writer; actor
- Known for: Insecure
- Notable work: Lightskinned Feelings
- Children: 2
- Website: langstonkerman.com

Langston Kerman (born April 23, 1987) is an American actor, writer, and comedian. He has acted in shows including Insecure, High Maintenance, Bless This Mess, The Boys and English Teacher. Kerman is a writer and co-star on HBO Max's South Side. His first comedy album, Lightskinned Feelings, was named to Vulture's list of 10 Best Comedy Albums of 2018.

== Early life and education ==
Kerman was raised in Oak Park, Illinois. His mother is African-American and his father is white and Jewish. He received his bachelor's degree in English from University of Michigan in 2009. After college he taught poetry at his former high school for one year. Kerman later received an MFA in poetry at Boston University and then decided to pursue a full-time career in stand-up comedy.

== Career ==
Kerman has acted in shows such as on Adam DeVine's House Party, High Maintenance, Strangers, and Comedy Bang! Bang!. He was selected by host Chris Rock to write for the 2016 Academy Awards.

In 2016, he appeared in his first recurring acting role as Jered on the first season of Issa Rae's scripted comedy-drama series Insecure. The role led to wider recognition.

On September 28, 2018, Kerman was featured in his own Comedy Central Stand-Up Presents half-hour special, Lightskinned Feelings (later titled "White People Can Keep Secrets"). On the same day, he also released an hour-long comedy album of the same name, which was recorded at Punchline Comedy Club in San Francisco. It was named to Vulture's 10 Best Comedy Albums of 2018 list.

Kerman has a voice-over role in IMDb's 2019 animated series You're Not a Monster. He also appeared in the 2019 Comedy Central series The New Negroes, and is also a writer and recurring actor for the HBO Max series South Side.

He was a series regular on the second season of Bless This Mess, and appeared in a recurring role on the second season of The Boys.

In August 2020, Kerman created the comedy podcast My Momma Told Me on the iHeartRadio Network. He discusses various Black conspiracy theories that he and his guests learned from their mothers.

Kerman co-created and co-stars in the 2022 Peacock series Bust Down. In 2023, he was cast in the Hulu mystery thriller series The Other Black Girl, a television adaptation of the 2021 novel by Zakiya Dalila Harris.

In 2024, Kerman released his first standalone comedy special, Bad Poetry, on Netflix. It was directed by comedian John Mulaney. Critics gave it high marks. In a review in The New Yorker, Vinson Cunningham wrote that "work like Kerman’s is the way back to comedy on its own terms, as an art to be enjoyed in its purest form." Vulture called it "a stellar introduction to Kerman’s whimsical brand of comedy." Cracked said that, "story after story, bit after bit, Kerman nails it." The Daily Beast described Kerman as "one of the most exciting stand-up comedians working right now."

Kerman appeared in a recurring role in the FX comedy series English Teacher, which premiered in September 2024.

== Personal life ==
Kerman is married. He and his wife have two children, a daughter born in 2021 and a son born in 2024.

== Filmography ==
=== Film ===
Year	Title	Role	Notes
2014	Teen Saw	Student	Short
2016	10 Crosby	Cute Guy	Short
2024	The Gutter	Half Life	
TBA	Cut Off	TBA	Post-production

=== Television ===
Year	Title	Role	Notes
2012	Just for Laughs: All Access	—N/a	1 episode; writer
2013	Clear History	Coffee Shop Patron	TV movie
2014	My Crazy Love	Freddy	1 episode
2015	Storytime	Self	Short; also writer
2015	The Battery's Down		1 episode; web series
2016	Adam DeVine's House Party	—N/a	1 episode; writer
2016	Comedy Bang! Bang!	Party Guy	1 episode
2016–2018	Insecure	Jered	7 episodes
2016	88th Academy Awards	—N/a	TV special; writer
2017	Strangers	Jake	1 episode
2018	High Maintenance		1 episode
2018	Singularity	Ethan	Unsold pilot
2018	Straight Up, Stand Up	—N/a	1 episode; writer
2018	The New Negroes	—N/a	1 episode; writer
2019	Sherman's Showcase		1 episode
2019	You're Not a Monster	Dr. Edgar Martinez / Pazuzu / Headless Horseman	3 episodes
2019–2020	Bless This Mess	Brandon	Series regular
2019; 2021	South Side	Adam Bethune	3 episodes; also writer and story editor
2020	BET Awards 2020	—N/a	TV special; writer
2020	The Boys	Eagle the Archer	Recurring role
2021–2023	Solar Opposites	Various voices	3 episodes
2022	Bust Down	Langston	Main role; also co-creator, executive producer, and star
2023	Not Dead Yet	Jesse	2 episodes
2023	How I Met Your Father	Eli	1 episode
2023	The Other Black Girl	Jesse Watson	Recurring role
2024	English Teacher	Harry	Recurring role (season 1)
2024–2026	Abbott Elementary	Darnell	3 episodes
2025	Everybody's Live with John Mulaney	Bubbles Jackson, Mohel Abraham Davis	2 episodes; also writer
