= Rachel Crow =

American singer and actress (born 1998)

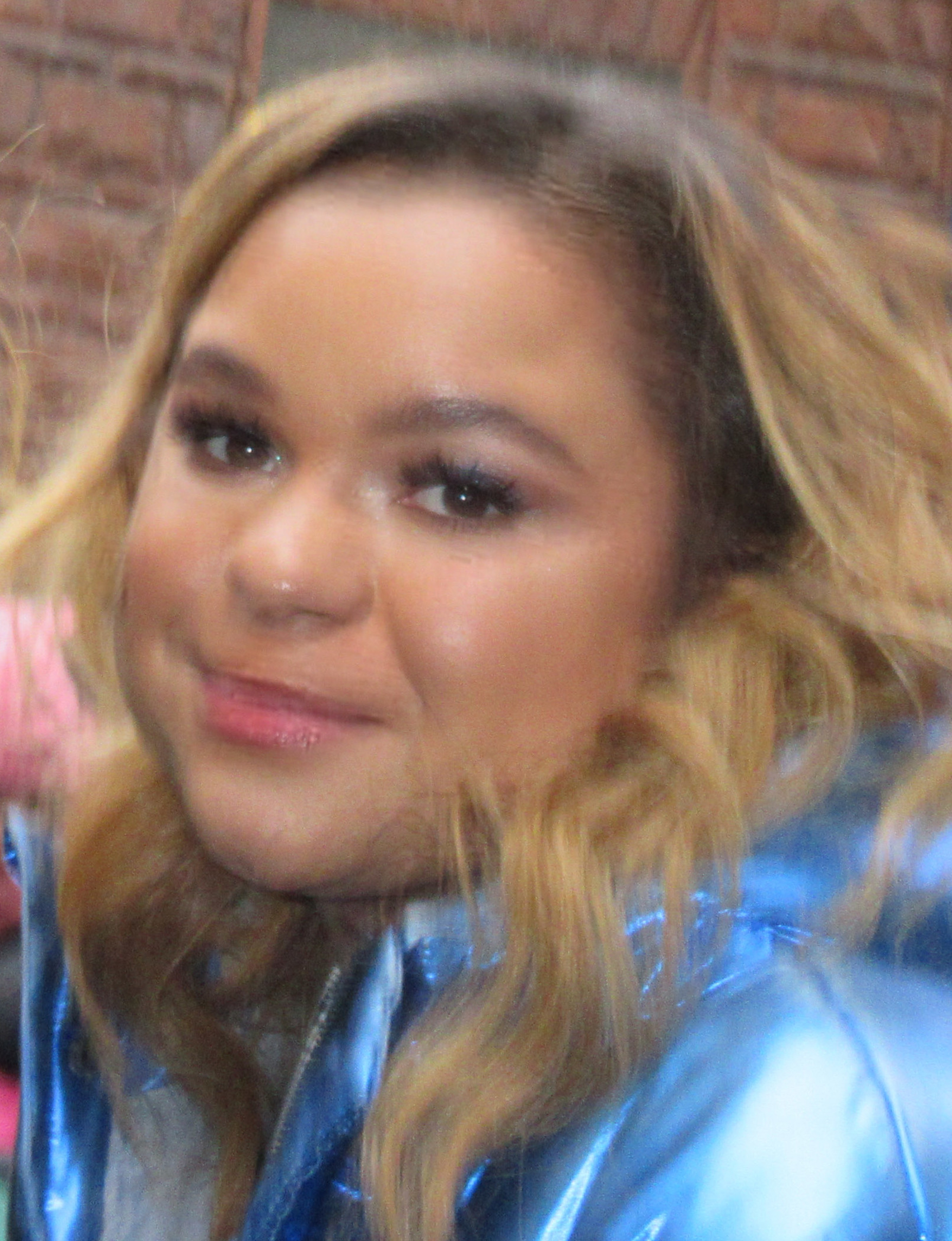
- Crow performing in 2019
- Born: Rachel Kelly Crow; January 23, 1998 (age 28); Mead, Colorado, U.S.
- Occupations: Singer; actress
- Years active: 2005–present
- Musical career
- Genres: Pop; R&B; Soul
- Instrument: Vocals
- Labels: Syco; Columbia; Nickelodeon; S-Curve

Rachel Kelly Crow (born January 23, 1998) is an American singer and actress. She participated in the first season of the American version of The X Factor in 2011 and was the first audition ever broadcast on TV. She was the ninth contestant eliminated. Following her elimination, she contacted Walt Disney for possible roles in future Disney productions. This resulted in her appearing in multiple television shows and films, including BrainSurge, Inside Edition, Big Time Rush, Figure It Out, The Wendy Williams Show, Invisible Sister, and Fred: The Show. Crow released her first and eponymous extended play (EP) in June 2012. She has cited Kendrick Lamar, Etta James, Eminem, and SZA as musical influences.

In 2014, Crow was featured in a peta2 advertisement promoting pet adoption.

During the COVID-19 pandemic, Crow decided to leave Los Angeles. She graduated from the Institute of Culinary Education in New York City in 2025.

== Early life ==
Rachel Kelly Crow was born on January 23, 1998, in Mead, Colorado, to an abusive household and cocaine-addicted mother. She was fostered at six months old and adopted a year later by Barbara, a former hospital counselor, and Kelly Crow, owner of an excavation business in Boulder. She has one younger sister, Hannah.

According to her mother, Crow sang her first song, "This Kiss" by Faith Hill, when she was 18 months old. At the age of six, Crow sang in her school's talent show. In 2008, when she was 10 years old, she moved with her family to Los Angeles, California, to pursue a career in music. From ages 10 to 12, she performed stand-up comedy and was part of the first group of kids to go to Las Vegas and perform at Harrah's casino. She was homeschooled.

== Music career ==
=== 2011: The X Factor ===
Crow auditioned for the first season of the US version of The X Factor in 2011 with the song "Mercy" (2008) by Duffy. She reached the live shows and was sent home in the bottom two in the quarterfinals, which meant she had to participate in a sing-off with fellow contestant Marcus Canty. After a judge's deadlock, she was sent home because she received the fewest votes. When the results were announced, Crow broke down sobbing and had to be picked up by her mentor Simon Cowell and consoled by her mother.

The X Factor performances and results
| Episode | Theme | Order | Song | Original artist | Result |
|---|---|---|---|---|---|
| Audition | Auditioner's Choice | —N/a | "Mercy" | Duffy | Through to Bootcamp |
| Bootcamp 1 | Group Performance 1 | —N/a | "Who You Are" | Jessie J | Advanced |
| Bootcamp 2 | Group Performance 2 | —N/a | "I Have Nothing" (with Joshua Maddox, 4Shore, Hayley Orrantia, Illusion Confusion, Caylie Gregorio, De'Quan Allen and Ellona Santiago) | Whitney Houston | Advanced |
| Bootcamp 3 | Solo Performance | —N/a | "If I Were a Boy" | Beyoncé | Through to Judges' Houses |
| Judges' houses | Free Choice | —N/a | "I Want It That Way" | Backstreet Boys | Through to Live Shows |
| Week 1 | Free Choice | 14 | "Baby"/"Where Did Our Love Go" | Justin Bieber / The Supremes | Saved by Simon Cowell |
| Week 2 | Judge's Choice | 4 | "Walking on Sunshine" | Katrina and the Waves | Safe (2nd) |
| Week 3 | Songs from movies | 11 | "I'd Rather Go Blind" | Etta James | Safe (1st) |
| Week 4 | Rock | 2 | "(I Can't Get No) Satisfaction" | The Rolling Stones | Safe (1st) |
| Week 5 | Giving Thanks | 1 | "I Believe" | Yolanda Adams | Safe (3rd) |
| Week 6 | Songs by Michael Jackson | 4 | "Can You Feel It" | The Jacksons | Safe (2nd) |
| Week 7 | Dance music hits | 3 | "Nothin' on You" | B.o.B / Bruno Mars | Bottom two |
| Week 7 | Save me songs | 8 | "Music and Me" | Michael Jackson | Bottom two |
| Final Showdown (Week 7) | Free Choice | 2 | "I'd Rather Go Blind" | Etta James | Eliminated via Deadlock (5th) |

=== 2012–present: Music debut ===
In February 2012, it was announced that Crow signed a music deal with Columbia Records and a television deal with Nickelodeon for her own show. She was also featured on Big Time Rush's Summer Tour 2012 along with Cody Simpson and starred on a two-part episode of Fred: The Show.

In June 2012, Crow announced via Twitter that she would be releasing a five-song EP, featuring one song co-written by Crow herself. She later announced via her website that it would be released on June 26, 2012, and would be self-titled. The lead single, "Mean Girls," was co-written by Crow and Toby Gad and produced by Gad. The four other songs are "Rock With You" featuring rapper Mann, "Lemonade," "My Kind of Wonderful", and "What A Song Can Do." She has also worked with producer Jonas Jeberg, who has worked with singers such as The Wanted. In a review of "Mean Girls", The Re-View complimented Crow's "intelligence and aspirations" and finished the article saying of the singer: "I don't doubt that her vocal ability to out-diva some of the best singers will lead to even greater things in the future."

On April 21, 2017, Crow released "Solo" for the soundtrack of the Netflix film Deidra and Laney Rob a Train, which she also starred in. A month later, she released her single "Dime" through BMG Rights Management, describing the song as "just kind of a fun, feel-good summer song, and it was mostly just about telling everyone who hates on you goodbye." In interviews with Pop Crush and iHeart, she stated that she had "darker, edgier" songs coming out at the end of summer and that she might release an EP later that year, but neither came to fruition.

In 2018, Crow released "Coulda Told Me" featuring American rapper Chika through S-Curve Records. Written while Crow was on a plane, the song deals with feeling unheard and invisible. The accompanying music video uses an Alice in Wonderland theme "to make people ask if what she was feeling was real."

On January 25, 2019, Crow released "Up All Night", which was written by Crow, Emlyn, Sam Fischer, and Emanuel Kiriakou and produced by Kiriakou. In an interview with AOL, Crow said the song was "inspired by a sort-of relationship I had the summer of 2017" and was about "that feeling of wanting to spend every waking moment with that person and staying up all night with them." She later released a remix with Australian producer Ryan Riback.

== Television and acting career ==
Rachel Crow appeared on a few Nickelodeon shows in the early 2010s such as Fred: The Show, and Big Time Rush and had signed a series development deal with the network, though this did not result in an aired series. Crow said that she would have wanted to duet with Eminem if she had a series.

Crow voiced Carla in the film Rio 2, which was released in 2014. Crow also provided the voice of Gratuity "Tip" Tucci on the Netflix cartoon Home: Adventures with Tip and Oh.

In 2017, Crow starred alongside Ashleigh Murray in the Netflix original film Deidra & Laney Rob a Train, which holds a 92% rating on Rotten Tomatoes. Crow also starred in ABC's Schooled as recurring character "Felicia Somers". Crow appeared in four episodes of the first season.

Crow was reported to be cast in the 2018 Transformers film Bumblebee, but this did not come to fruition.

== Filmography ==
=== Film ===
| Year | Title | Role | Notes |
|---|---|---|---|
| 2014 | Rio 2 | Carla | Voice |
| 2015 | Invisible Sister | Nikki | |
| 2017 | Deidra & Laney Rob a Train | Laney | |
| 2018 | Bumblebee | Liz | Uncredited and appears in deleted scenes |

=== Television ===
| Year | Title | Role | Notes |
|---|---|---|---|
| 2005 | Three Wise Guys | Girl | Uncredited |
| 2006 | In from the Night | Little Girl in Doctors Office | Uncredited |
| 2010 | Pizza & Karaoke | Darla | TV movie |
| 2011 | BrainSurge | Herself | Contestant |
| 2011 | The X Factor USA | Herself | Contestant |
| 2012 | Arthur Ashe Kids' Day 2012 | Herself | |
| 2012 | Big Time Rush | Winnie | Episode: "Bel Air Rush" |
| 2012 | Fred: The Show | Starr | Recurring role; 8 episodes |
| 2013 | The Office | Gabriella | Episode: "A.A.R.M." |
| 2013 | Figure It Out | Herself | 6 episodes |
| 2016–2018 | Home: Adventures with Tip & Oh | Tip (voice) | Main role |
| 2018 | The Goldbergs | Felicia Somers | Episode: "The Goldbergs: 1990-Something" |
| 2019–2020 | Schooled | Felicia Somers | 6 episodes |
| 2019 | The Lion Guard | Imara | Voice Role; "Return to the Pride Lands" |
| 2019 | Timeline | Dee | Lead role |

== Discography ==
=== Extended plays ===
| Title | Details | Peak chart positions |
| Title | Details | US Heat |
|---|---|---|
| Rachel Crow | Release date: June 26, 2012; Label: Syco Music/Columbia Records; Formats: Digital download, streaming | 14 |

=== Singles ===
| Title | Year | Album |
|---|---|---|
| "Mean Girls" | 2012 | Rachel Crow |
| "Solo" | 2017 | Non-album singles |
| "Dime" | 2017 | Non-album singles |
| "Coulda Told Me" | 2018 | Non-album singles |
| "Up All Night" | 2019 | Non-album singles |

=== Other appearances ===
| Title | Year | Other artist(s) | Album |
|---|---|---|---|
| "Santa Claus Is Comin' to Town" | 2012 | —N/a | Merry Nickmas |

=== Music videos ===
| Title | Year | Director |
|---|---|---|
| "Mean Girls" | 2012 | |
| "Santa Claus Is Comin' To Town | 2012 | |
| "Dime" | 2017 | |
| "Coulda Told Me" | 2018 | Brad Wong |
| "Up All Night" | 2019 | |
