= Tara Duncan (media executive) =

American business executive

Tara Duncan is an American executive in the entertainment industry. She is president of Onyx Collective, which focuses on content creators of color and underrepresented voices, and is known for her role in diversifying content. Duncan previously served as president of Freeform, Disney's cable network for Gen Z, from 2020–2023. As of 2021, Duncan was one of only a few entertainment industry executives in the United States who is black.

In 2023, Duncan was named a 2023 Black Women in Hollywood Honoree by Essence magazine.

== Early life and education ==
An avid television watcher since childhood, Duncan grew up in Inland Empire, two hours east of Los Angeles. She was a fan of My So-Called Life and General Hospital. During her senior year in high school, Duncan had an internship at ABC Daytime, which she secured with help from Sarah Dorsey Rice of the Emma Bowen Foundation. She attended Loyola Marymount University in Los Angeles, California.

== Career ==
Duncan worked at production company Section Eight, founded by George Clooney and Steven Soderbergh. In 2005, she moved to New York City and worked for HBO, before moving to a role in production at AMC, which was in the early stages of building original series such as Breaking Bad.

Duncan eventually left the cable industry to work with streaming services. At Amazon Prime Video, she produced the pilot for Bosch, its first original drama series.

In 2014, Duncan started working at Netflix as one of its first creative executives. At Netflix, she oversaw the production of Orange Is the New Black and Narcos. She left in 2018 to take a personal sabbatical and traveled the world for a year and a half.

In 2020, Duncan joined Disney General Entertainment as president of Freeform. She launched Cruel Summer, as well as Single Drunk Female, the cable network's two most-watched original series. Freeform has also launched its first animated series, Praise Petey. Keep This Between Us has had the network's highest unscripted debut.

After launching the Onyx Collective for Disney in 2021, Duncan oversaw the creation of its first title, Summer of Soul, produced by Questlove, which won the 2022 Academy Award for Best Documentary Feature. Onyx has also added The Hair Tales, Unprisoned, and The Plot, as well as the critically acclaimed Reasonable Doubt, produced by Kerry Washington. In 2023, Onyx released The 1619 Project docuseries.

Another project that Duncan has worked on for Hulu is The Other Black Girl, an adaptation of the 2021 novel by Zakiya Daila Harris, which Duncan executive produced. Duncan also serves as an executive producer on Under the Bridge.
