= 4400 =

4400 is a number. It may also refer to:

- The 4400, a 2004 American science fiction television series
- 4400 (TV series), a 2021 American science fiction mystery drama reboot of The 4400
- 4400, a year in the far future or in the past during the 5th millennium BC
