= The Hair Tales =

- Created by: Michaela Angela Davis; Tracee Ellis Ross
- Based on: The Hair Tales (2016)
- Presented by: Tracee Ellis Ross
- Country of origin: United States
- Original language: English
- No. of seasons: 1
- No. of episodes: 6

Production
- Executive producers: Michaela Angela Davis; Tracee Ellis Ross; Oprah Winfrey; Tara Duncan; Carri Twigg; Raeshem Nihjon
- Production companies: Onyx Collective; Joy Mill Entertainment; Culture House; Tetravision; Harpo Films

Original release
- Network: Oprah Winfrey Network, Hulu
- Release: October 22, 2022 – present

The Hair Tales is an American documentary television series that aired on Hulu and the Oprah Winfrey Network. It was co-created by Tracee Ellis Ross, who also hosts the series, and Michaela Angela Davis. It explores the significance and history of Black hair. It premiered on October 22, 2022.

== Production ==
The idea was developed by journalist Michaela Angela Davis, who co-created the series with host Tracee Ellis Ross. In 2016, Davis released a series of videos titled "Hair Tales" which featured interviews with Black women celebrities and leaders like Regina King and Patrisse Cullors. The video series drew the attention of Tara Duncan and Carri Twigg, head of development at Culture House, which produced the series. They pitched the series to several people, including Ross and Oprah Winfrey who joined the project.

The series was officially greenlit in 2020. The series was produced by Joy Mill Entertainment, Culture House, Tetravision, and Harpo Films. It was the first partnership between Hulu and the Oprah Winfrey Network (OWN). Davis, Ross, Winfrey, Twigg, Duncan and Raeshem Nihjon served as executive producers. When developing the series, the show's creators developed themes and questions to ask interviewees, and then allowed the show to develop "naturally" from what they got.

== Synopsis ==
The series examines the historical importance of African-American hair through the lives of six Black women: Issa Rae, Ayanna Pressley, CHIKA, Marsai Martin, Chloe Bailey and Oprah Winfrey. Interviews with experts and academics discuss the historical and social context of Black hair care.

== Release ==
The series premiered on October 22, 2022 on both Hulu and OWN. One episode aired weekly on OWN, while two episodes aired weekly on Hulu.

== Reception ==
The series was mostly well received by critics. Decider gave the series' premiere episode a positive review, and praised Ross' hosting. Stephanie Snyder of Common Sense Media gave the series 5 out of 5 stars, praising its educational value and its empowering message.

Angela Han of The Hollywood Reporter gave the series a mixed review, writing that it "emphasizes commiseration over debate, personal anecdotes over history lessons and broadly uplifting statements over more nuanced analysis." Han praised its premise and centering of Black women, but criticized the series' focus on celebrities rather than including other women like athletes and low-income people, as well as the exclusion of transgender women.

Cassandra Pinto of Vogue described the series as "a love letter to Black women".
