= Aisha Harris =

American writer, editor, and podcaster

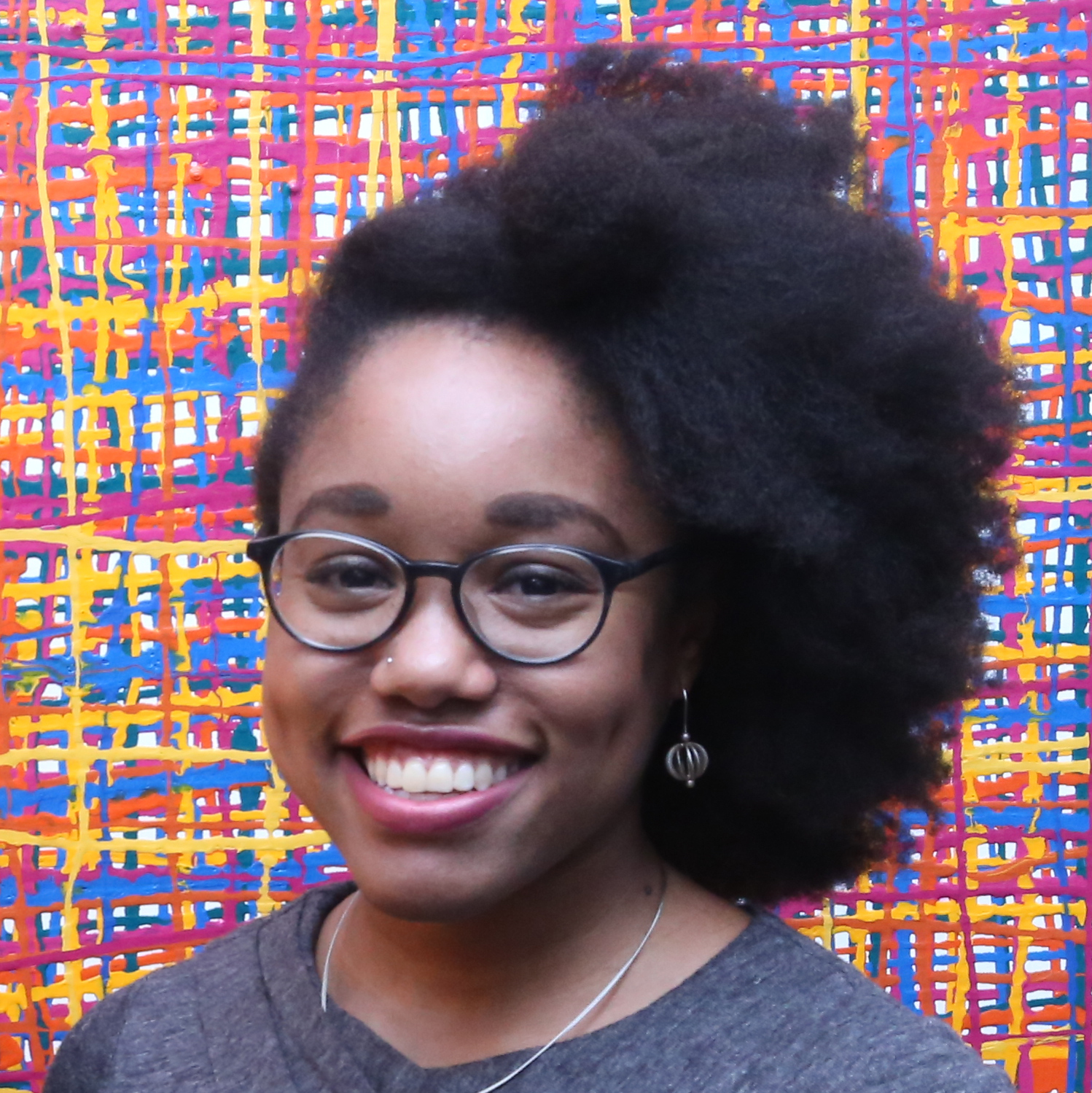
- Harris in 2015
- Born: January 11, 1988 (age 38); Connecticut, U.S.
- Education: Northwestern University; New York University
- Occupations: Writer, editor, podcaster
- Employer: Slate
- Parent: Frank Harris III
- Family: Zakiya Dalila Harris
- Website: www.aishaharris.com

Aisha Harris is an American writer, editor, and podcaster. She was a staff writer, editor and podcast host at Slate before moving to the New York Times in 2018 as an editor. Since 2020, she has been a co-host and reporter for the NPR show Pop Culture Happy Hour.

== Early life and education ==
Harris was born and raised in the state of Connecticut. Her father, Frank Harris III, is a professor and former journalist for the Hartford Courant. Her sister is author Zakiya Dalila Harris.

Harris earned a bachelor's degree in theater from Northwestern and a master's degree in cinema studies from NYU.

== Career ==
Harris was a staff writer and editor at Slate from 2012 through 2018. She hosted the Slate podcast Represent from 2016 to 2018; the podcast covered media created by and/or about women, people of color, people with disabilities, and the LGBTQ community.

Harris moved to the New York Times in 2018; first working as an assistant editor TV at the culture desk, and later as an editor and contributor to the Opinion section of the paper from 2019 to 2020. While at the Times, she joined a number of her colleagues at both the NYT and the Philadelphia Inquirer in a one-day walkout over issues in the newspapers' coverage of racial justice protests in 2020.

Since 2020, Harris has been a co-host of the NPR podcast Pop Culture Happy Hour with Linda Holmes, Stephen Thompson, and Glen Weldon.

=== Santa Claus and Megyn Kelly ===
In December 2013, Harris wrote a piece for Slate examining the cultural origins of Santa Claus and suggesting that the near-ubiquitous representation of Santa as white could be eschewed in favor of a wider symbol, such as an animal. In response to Harris's piece, Fox News anchor Megyn Kelly responded by asserting on her program The Kelly File that "Santa just is white", and stating that the same was true for Jesus Christ. Kelly's comments drew heavy criticism from a variety of news outlets; in response, Kelly accused her criticizers of "race-baiting". Harris appeared on CNN and criticized Kelly's response, stating that Kelly's statements simultaneously played the role of victim and that Kelly downplayed the comments as a joke after the initial backlash.
