= Deidra & Laney Rob a Train =

- Digital release poster
- Directed by: Sydney Freeland
- Written by: Shelby Farrell
- Produced by: Susan Cartsonis; Nick Moceri
- Starring: Ashleigh Murray; Rachel Crow; Tim Blake Nelson; David Sullivan; Danielle Nicolet; Sasheer Zamata; Lance Gray
- Cinematography: Quyen Tran
- Edited by: Michael Taylor
- Music by: Mark Orton
- Production company: Netflix
- Distributed by: Netflix
- Release dates: January 23, 2017 (Sundance); March 17, 2017 (United States)
- Country: United States
- Language: English

Deidra & Laney Rob a Train is an American comedy drama crime film directed by Sydney Freeland, from a screenplay by Shelby Farrell. It stars Ashleigh Murray, Rachel Crow, Tim Blake Nelson, David Sullivan, Danielle Nicolet, and Sasheer Zamata.

The film had its world premiere at the Sundance Film Festival on January 23, 2017, before being released on March 17, 2017, by Netflix.

== Plot ==
Deidra & Laney's mother Marigold is taken to jail, and they are left to support themselves. To keep her sister Laney and younger brother Jet from being placed in foster care, Deidra makes a plan to rob trains. They need enough money to help pay their mother's bills and bail her out of jail. Along the way, they rekindle old relationships and find out who is real and to be trusted amongst their family and friends.

== Cast ==
- Ashleigh Murray as Deidra, the older sister
- Rachel Crow as Laney, the younger sister
- Tim Blake Nelson as Truman, the Pacific Western detective
- David Sullivan as Chet, the father
- Danielle Nicolet as Marigold, the mother
- Sasheer Zamata as Ms. Spencer, the high school guidance counselor
- Missi Pyle as Mrs. Fowler
- Sharon Lawrence as Veronica
- Arturo Castro as McMillian, the local police officer
- Lance Gray as Jet, the little brother
- Brooke Markham as Claire, Laney's high school friend
- Kinna McInroe as Gloria, the child social services worker

== Production ==
In June 2016, it was announced Ashleigh Murray, Rachel Crow, David Sullivan, Tim Blake Nelson, Danielle Nicolet, Sasheer Zamata and Arturo Castro had been cast in the film, with Sydney Freeland directing from a screenplay by Shelby Farrell, while Susan Cartsonis and Nick Moceri will produce the film, alongside Netflix who will finance and distribute the film.

=== Filming ===
Principal photography began in July 2016, in Utah in places including Ogden and Salt Lake City. Many of the railroad scenes were filmed in Heber City at the Heber Valley Railroad and all of the scenes at a school and prison were filmed at Judge Memorial Catholic High School.

== Release ==
The film had its world premiere at the Sundance Film Festival on January 23, 2017. It was released on March 17, 2017 by Netflix.

=== Critical reception ===
Deidra and Laney Rob a Train received positive reviews from film critics. On the review aggregator website Rotten Tomatoes, 92% of 24 critics' reviews are positive, with an average rating of 6.8/10. Metacritic, which uses a weighted average, assigned the film a score of 65 out of 100, based on seven critics, indicating "generally favorable" reviews.

== See also ==
- List of black films of the 2010s
