= Frank Lesser =

American author and satirist (born 1980)

- Born: January 1980 (age 46); Columbus, Ohio
- Education: Brown University
- Occupations: Novelist; screenwriter
- Website: www.franklesser.com

Frank Lesser (born 1980) is an American author and satirist best known as a staff writer for The Colbert Report from 2005 until 2013. For his work in the show he has received four Primetime Emmys. In 2011 he wrote the book Sad Monsters and in 2019 created the IMDb adult animated series You're Not a Monster. He was also a writer for the first season of TruTv's At Home with Amy Sedaris (2017–2021) Lesser has also contributed comedic pieces for The New York Times, The Washington Post, Slate.com, and McSweeney’s Internet Tendency.

== Early life ==
Lesser was born an only child and grew up in Bexley, Ohio. He attended Brown University, where he wrote for The Brown Jug and majored in Semiotics, graduating in 2002. After college Lesser worked as a production assistant and freelance writer for various Viacom stations.

== Career ==
=== 2005–2013: The Colbert Report ===
Lesser joined Comedy Central's The Colbert Report as a writer in 2005:

I met somebody who had just been hired as a writer’s assistant on Colbert. She invited me to a taping and asked what was up. I told her this whole sob story ending with, “I was at the lowest point in my life,” and she said, “Oh well, you know that they're hiring,” and then sort of didn't say anything. And then a month later they hired me, although she did say after I got hired, “Yeah, give it a month and a half, you'll be complaining just as much as you were before.” I think she really nailed the comedy writer mindset.

On The Colbert Report Lesser has appeared as different characters, among them a drug lord, a conquistador, and Colbert's "interview stunt beard." During his send-off on the show, Colbert remarked that "Around the office Frank was known for his intelligence, sensitivity, and his completely unproducible scripts. Seriously, Frank, where are we going to get a hovercraft." When asked about his experience writing for The Colbert Report, Lesser said:

It’s wonderful when the person who’s in charge is a brilliantly talented, hilarious person. And so in some ways, you don’t feel as bad when they cut your jokes because you’re like, “Okay, well this person knows what they’re talking about,” and in other ways you’re like, “Why doesn’t Stephen Colbert like this joke?”

=== 2011–present: Sad Monsters and You're Not a Monster ===
In 2011 he wrote the book Sad Monsters: Growling on the Outside, Crying on the Inside, a collection of short humor pieces exploring the trial and tribulations of different monsters, accompanied by illustrations by Willie Real.

In 2017 he joined the writing staff of surreal comedy television series At Home with Amy Sedaris. In 2019, Lesser created the adult animated series You're Not a Monster for IMDb. It was the streaming service first ever scripted series. The show starred Kelsey Grammer as a vampire turned therapist mentoring his great-great grandson Max, played by Eric Stonestreet, "a therapist who has inherited his practice".

== Personal life ==
As of 2011 Lesser lived in the East Village neighborhood of New York.

== Credits ==
=== Television ===
Year	Title	Role	Notes
2005–2013	The Colbert Report	Various	Writer
2010	Rally to Restore Sanity and/or Fear	-	TV special, writer
2017	At Home with Amy Sedaris	-	Six episodes, writer
2019	You're Not a Monster	-	Creator and writer
