= Rachel Crow (EP) =

EP by Rachel Crow
- Released: June 26, 2012
- Recorded: 2012
- Genre: Pop
- Length: 15:31
- Label: Syco/Columbia
- Producer: Toby Gad

Singles from Rachel Crow
- 1. "Mean Girls" Released: June 26, 2012

Rachel Crow is the debut extended play (EP) by The X Factor season one finalist Rachel Crow. The EP was released on June 26, 2012, by Syco Music and Columbia Records.

== Background ==
Crow announced via Twitter that she would be releasing a five-song EP in June 2012, featuring one song co-written by Crow herself. She later announced via her website that it would be released on June 26, 2012, and will be self-titled. The lead single is "Mean Girls," which Crow co-wrote with Toby Gad. Gad also produced the song. The four other songs are "Rock with You" featuring rapper Mann, "Lemonade," "My Kind of Wonderful" and "What a Song Can Do." She has also worked with producer Jonas Jeberg, who has worked with singers such as The Wanted.

== Track listing ==
No.	Title	Writer(s)	Producer(s)	Length
1.	"Mean Girls"	Rachel Crow, Toby Gad, Autumn Rowe	Gad	3:09
2.	"Rock with You (featuring Mann)"	Jonas Jerberg, Edythe Craighead, Ronald Dunbar, Silya Nymoen		3:13
3.	"Lemonade"	Isaac Hasson, Mher Filian, Shelly Peiken		2:54
4.	"My Kind of Wonderful"	Gad, Lindy Robbins, Dionne Bromfield		2:55
5.	"What a Song Can Do"	Catt Gravitt, Gerald O'Brien, Jackie Wilson		3:20

== Charts ==
Chart (2012)	Peak position
U.S. Billboard Top Heatseekers	14
