= Glen Weldon =

American writer and podcaster

- Education: Southampton College
- Occupation: Writer

Glen Weldon is an American writer, cultural critic, and podcaster. He has written for publications such as The Washington Post, The New York Times, Slate, The Atlantic, and McSweeney's. Weldon currently writes for the NPR Arts Desk and is a panelist on the podcast Pop Culture Happy Hour.

== Career ==
Weldon currently writes for the NPR Arts Desk and is a panelist on the podcast Pop Culture Happy Hour with Linda Holmes, Stephen Thompson, and Aisha Harris.

In his work, Weldon often draws on his life experience as a gay man and a self-described "nerd". In addition to shorter fiction work appearing in anthologies and publications, he is the author of two non-fiction pop culture histories about comic book superheroes and nerd culture. Superman: The Unauthorized Biography, published in 2013, chronicled the history of Superman and his role as an iconic American figure. 2016's The Caped Crusade covered Batman's relevance through decades of popular culture.

Weldon has earned an Arts Journalism Fellowship from the National Endowment for the Arts, a Pew Fellowship in the Arts for Fiction, a Ragdale Writing Fellowship, and an Amtrak Writers' Residency.

== Personal life ==
Weldon grew up in West Chester, Pennsylvania. He attended Southampton College and graduated with a degree in marine biology. On his NPR bio page, it is stated that he was "a completely inept marine biologist and a slightly better-ept competitive swimmer."

== Works ==
- Superman: The Unauthorized Biography. ISBN 9781118341841
- The Caped Crusade: Batman and the Rise of Nerd Culture. ISBN 9781476756691
- "Of MSE-6 and Men" short story in From a Certain Point of View
