= You're Not a Monster =

- Genre: Horror-comedy
- Created by: Frank Lesser
- Written by: Frank Lesser
- Voices of: Kelsey Grammer; Eric Stonestreet; Patton Oswalt; Ellie Kemper; Aparna Nancherla
- Country of origin: United States
- Original language: English
- No. of seasons: 1
- No. of episodes: 10

Production
- Executive producers: Kelsey Grammer; Frank Lesser; Brad T. Gottfred; Jordan McMahon; Corey Moss; Tom Russo
- Running time: 4–5 minutes
- Production companies: Grammnet Productions; Bold Soul Studios; Ranker

Original release
- Network: IMDb TV
- Release: October 10, 2019

You're Not a Monster is an American adult animated series created by Frank Lesser, and voiced by Kelsey Grammer, Eric Stonestreet, Patton Oswalt, Ellie Kemper and Aparna Nancherla. The series premiered on October 10, 2019 on IMDb TV (now renamed Amazon Freevee).

The series was removed from IMDb TV in December 2022.

== Premise ==
In the series, You're Not a Monster, "Kelsey Grammer will take a seat in the therapist chair for the first time since his Frasier days as former psychiatrist-turned-vampire who mentors his great-great grandson Max," played by Eric Stonestreet, "a therapist who has inherited his practice."

== Cast ==
- Kelsey Grammer as John Seward, Max's great-great grandfather who was turned into a vampire by Count Dracula. He gives helpful advice for Max.
- Eric Stonestreet as Max Seward, the great-great-grandson of John Seward who is a psychiatrist for monsters. He is nursing a broken heart over his ex-girlfriend, Elsa.
- Aparna Nancherla as Nia Emissiona, Max's secretary who has the ability to transform into a demon.
- Patton Oswalt as The Invisible Man, a patient of Max's who just wants to be seen (emotionally).
- Ellie Kemper as Elsa Brenner, Max's ex-girlfriend.
- Adam Pally as Zombie
- Amy Sedaris
- Milana Vayntrub
- Peter Grosz
- Joel Kim Booster
- Amber Ruffin
- Langston Kerman

== Production ==
On July 9, 2019, IMDb announced its first ever scripted series featuring the voices of Kelsey Grammer, Eric Stonestreet, Patton Oswalt, Ellie Kemper and Aparna Nancherla.

The series is written and created by Frank Lesser, and is executive produced by Kelsey Grammer, Frank Lesser, Brad T. Gottfred, Jordan McMahon, Corey Moss and Tom Russo. Production companies involved with this series are Grammnet Productions, Bold Soul Studios and Ranker.
