= Hunter Parrish =

American actor and singer (born 1987)

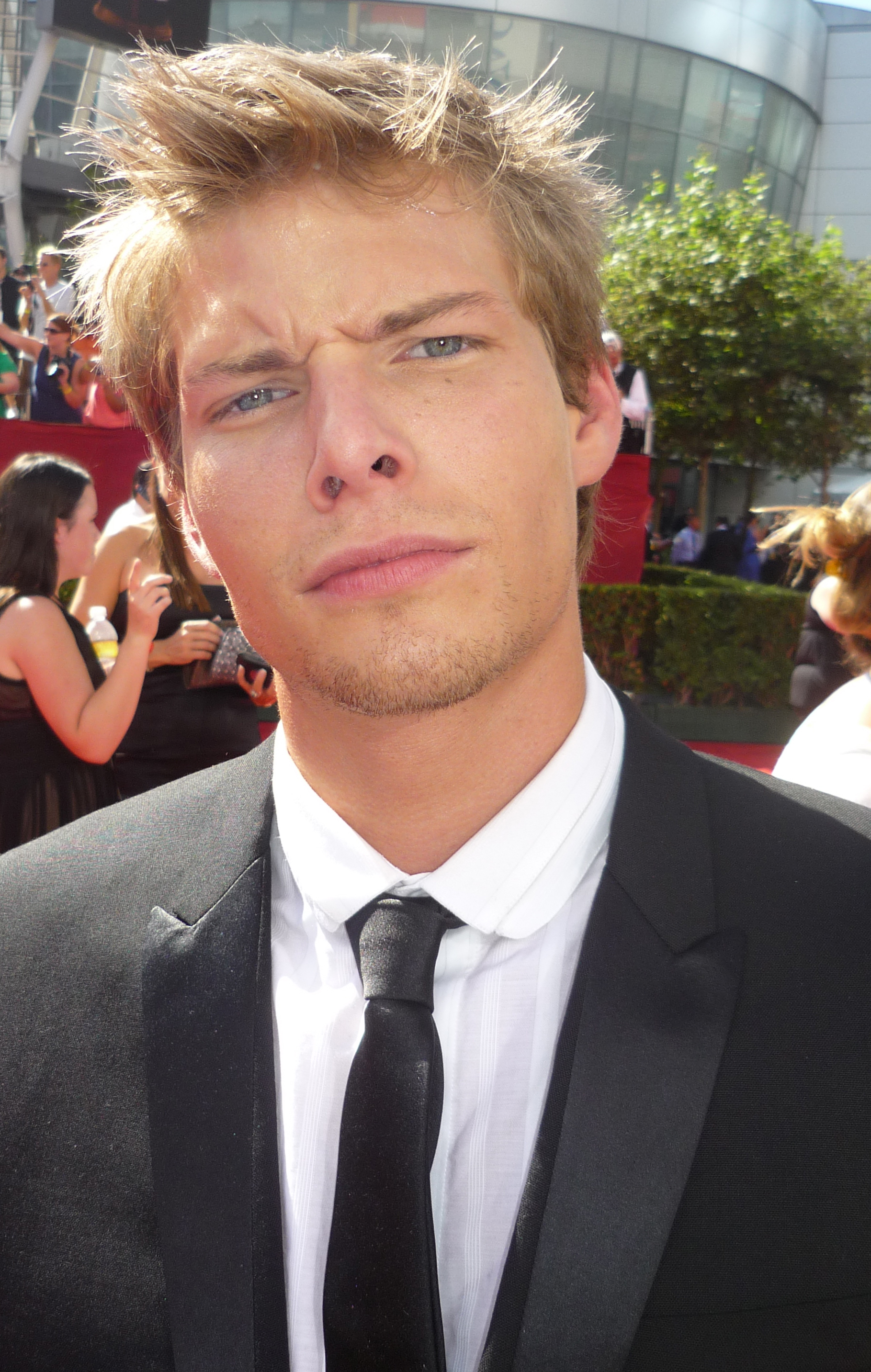
- Parrish at the 61st Primetime Emmy Awards in September 2009
- Born: Hunter Parrish Tharp; May 13, 1987 (age 39); Richmond, Virginia, U.S.
- Education: Texas Tech University Independent School District
- Occupations: Actor; singer
- Years active: 2003–present
- Spouse: Kathryn Wahl Parrish (m. 2015)
- Children: 2

Hunter Parrish Tharp (born May 13, 1987) is an American actor and singer. He is known for playing the role of Silas Botwin in the Showtime series Weeds and for his performances in the Broadway productions of Godspell in the role of Jesus and Spring Awakening as Melchior.

== Early life ==
Parrish was born in Richmond, Virginia, to Annie Parrish, who works with children with autism, and Bruce Tharp, an engineer. Parrish has an older brother. He graduated from Plano Senior High School and Texas Tech University Independent School District.

== Career ==
=== 2003–2005: Early career ===
After being seen at a showcase in New York, directed by Peter Seidman, Parrish was offered professional representation and went on to guest star in several television shows and appeared in the film Sleepover (2004).

=== 2005–2012: Weeds and Broadway debut ===
Parrish gained recognition when he began starring in the hit Showtime series Weeds in 2005. The show ran for eight seasons, ending in 2012. Part of the main ensemble cast, Parrish portrayed the role of the older Botwin son, Silas.

Following filming of Weeds fourth season, Parrish joined the cast of the Tony Award-winning Broadway musical Spring Awakening at the Eugene O'Neill Theatre in New York City. He made his Broadway debut on August 11, 2008, as the replacement for the lead role of Melchior Gabor for which he received critical acclaim. He remained in the role until the show closed on January 18, 2009. Parrish returned to Broadway two-and-a-half years later, to star in the 2011 Broadway revival of Godspell in which he starred as Jesus. Performances began October 13, 2011. He left the show on April 15, 2012, to film the final season of Weeds.

During this period, Parrish had many other roles on screen. He has supporting parts in the films RV (2006), Freedom Writers (2007), 17 Again (2009), and It's Complicated (2009). In Freedom Writers, Parrish played Ben Samuels, the only white student in a California high school class. The National Review Online wrote that Parrish had played the role with "unassuming humour". He had a handful of guest roles on TV and took part in the 2008 short "Cougar 101 with Hunter Parrish" for funnyordie.com. From 2007 to 2009, he hosted the web series Two Guys and a Girl with his friends Kyle Sherman and Allison Tyler.

=== 2012–present: dramatic roles in television and film ===
Since 2013, Parrish has had a string of recurring roles on television. In 2013 and 2014, he guest starred on The Good Wife as Jeffrey Grant, a young man accused of murder. In 2015, he also had recurring roles in The Following and Hand of God. Parrish had a main role in the Amazon series Good Girls Revolt, which was released in 2016. In 2017, Parrish was cast in the recurring role of Clay Haas in the second season of ABC's thriller series Quantico.

In March 2019, it was announced that Parrish would have one of the lead roles in the Jane the Virgin spin-off series Jane The Novela. Ultimately, the show was not picked up by The CW.

Earlier, in January 2019, it was announced that Parrish would appear in the Netflix drama series Ratched. Produced by Ryan Murphy, Ratched was picked up for one season, which was filmed from January to July 2019 and released on September 18, 2020.

In 2022, Parrish was cast in the Hulu mystery thriller series The Other Black Girl, a television adaptation of the 2021 novel by Zakiya Dalila Harris. The series premiered on September 13, 2023.

== Personal life ==
Parrish has been married to Kathryn Wahl since 2015. The couple have two children, a daughter born in September 2020 and a son born in November 2025. Parrish is a Christian.

== Filmography ==
=== Film ===
Year	Title	Role	Notes
2004	Sleepover	Lance Gregory	
2005	Steal Me	Tucker	
2005	Premonition	Charlie	Short film
2005	Down in the Valley	Kris	
2006	RV	Earl Gornicke	
2007	Freedom Writers	Ben Samuels	
2009	17 Again	Stan	
2009	Paper Man	Bryce	
2009	It's Complicated	Luke Adler	National Board of Review Award for Best Cast
2010	The Space Between	McDonough	
2012	Gone	Trey	
2014	Still Alice	Tom Howland	
2015	A Rising Tide	Sam Rama	
2017	All Nighter	Kip	
2025	Atrabilious	Milo Kramer	

=== Television ===
Year	Title	Role	Notes
2003	The Guardian	Hank	Episode: "The Father-Daughter Dance"
2005	Summerland	Tracy Hart	Episode: "The Pleiades"
2005–2012	Weeds	Silas Botwin	Main role; 102 episodes
2005	CSI: Crime Scene Investigation	Jeremy McBride	Episode: "Gum Drops"
2006	In Justice	Kevin Rounder	Episode: "Confessions"
2006	Close to Home	Jay Stratton	Episode: "A House Divided"
2006	Campus Ladies	Student health employee	Episode: "Webcam"
2007	Law & Order: Special Victims Unit	Jordan Owens	Episode: "Responsible"
2010	Batman: The Brave and the Bold	Kid Flash (voice)	Episode: "Requiem for a Scarlet Speedster!"
2011	Pound Puppies	Tundra (voice)	Episode: "Snow Problem"
2013–2014	The Good Wife	Jeffrey Grant	3 episodes
2015	The Following	Kyle Locke	5 episodes
2015	Hand of God	Josh Miller	5 episodes
2015–2016	Good Girls Revolt	Douglas Rhodes	Main role; 10 episodes
2017	Quantico	Clay Haas	9 episodes
2018	This Is Us	Alan	2 episodes
2019	Jane the Novela	Felix	Unaired television pilot
2020	Ratched	Father Andrews	2 episodes
2023	The Other Black Girl	Owen	Main role; 10 episodes
2026	Scarpetta	Benton Wesley (Past/Young)	Main role; 8 episodes

=== Stage ===
Year	Title	Role	Venue	Notes
2008–2009	Spring Awakening	Melchior	Eugene O'Neill Theatre	Broadway replacement
2011–2012	Godspell	Jesus	Circle in the Square Theatre	Broadway revival
2014	Hair	Claude	Hollywood Bowl	Hollywood Bowl
2018	Good Grief	JD	Vineyard Theatre	Off-Broadway
2021	To Kill a Mockingbird	Jem Finch	Shubert Theatre	Broadway replacement
2024	Gun & Powder	Jesse Whitewater	Paper Mill Playhouse	Regional

== Discography ==
In 2012, Parrish recorded his first EP called Guessing Games, featuring six songs. At first, Guessing Games was only available for sale in the lobby of Godspell’s home at the Circle in the Square Theatre, but with a bigger release to follow. The first single from the EP, "Sitting at Home", was released on iTunes on June 7, 2012. The complete EP was released later that month, on June 26.

== Awards and nominations ==
Year	Award	Category	Work	Result
2006	Screen Actors Guild Award	Outstanding Performance by an Ensemble in a Comedy Series (among the cast)	Weeds	Nominated
2008	Screen Actors Guild Award	Outstanding Performance by an Ensemble in a Comedy Series (among the cast)	Weeds	Nominated
