= The Other Black Girl (TV series) =

2023 American mystery thriller television series

- Promotional poster
- Genre: Comedy drama; Horror; Mystery; Thriller; Satire
- Based on: The Other Black Girl by Zakiya Dalila Harris
- Developed by: Zakiya Dalila Harris; Rashida Jones
- Showrunners: Jordan Reddout; Gus Hickey
- Starring: Sinclair Daniel; Ashleigh Murray; Brittany Adebumola; Hunter Parrish; Bellamy Young; Eric McCormack
- Music by: EmmoLei Sankofa
- Country of origin: United States
- Original language: English
- No. of seasons: 1
- No. of episodes: 10

Production
- Executive producers: Rashida Jones; Adam Fishbach; Zakiya Dalila Harris; Jordan Reddout; Gus Hickey; Tara Duncan; Marty Bowen; Wyck Godfrey; Danielle Henderson
- Running time: 24–31 minutes
- Production companies: Curl Pattern Productions; Reddout & Hickey; Le Train Train Productions; Fishbach Productions; Temple Hill Entertainment; Onyx Collective

Original release
- Network: Hulu
- Release: September 13, 2023

The Other Black Girl is an American comedy drama mystery thriller television series based on the 2021 novel of the same name by Zakiya Dalila Harris. The series premiered on Hulu on September 13, 2023. It focuses on Nella Rogers, an editorial assistant at Wagner Books and the only Black woman working for the company until the hiring of Hazel-May McCall. Following the hiring of Hazel, strange occurrences lead to Nella discovering the truth about Wagner's disturbing history. The story addresses racism in the corporate world and is inspired by Harris' own experiences as an editor.

The series received positive reviews from critics, who praised its writing, acting, and realistic portrayal of the struggles and racism Black women experience in the workplace. Sinclair Daniel and Ashleigh Murray received universal acclaim for their individual performances and on-screen chemistry together. Brittany Adebumola, Garcelle Beauvais, and Bellamy Young also garnered praise for their supporting roles. The Other Black Girl received numerous accolades, including nominations at the GLAAD Media Awards, NAACP Image Awards, and Black Reel TV Awards. Murray won a NAMIC Vision Award for her performance. In May 2024, the series was canceled after one season.

== Premise ==
Nella Rogers is an editorial assistant at Wagner Books, a publishing house in New York City. As the only Black woman working for the company, she feels lonely, undervalued, and marginalized. Nella is excited when Wagner hires Hazel-May McCall, another Black woman, and the two quickly bond and become friends. Shortly thereafter, Nella receives a mysterious message instructing her to leave Wagner Books. Cracks form in Nella and Hazel's friendship after Hazel's advice gets Nella in trouble with her boss and Wagner's employees begin showing favoritism towards Hazel. This makes Nella question whether Hazel is purposely sabotaging her in order to advance herself. Eventually, Nella begins uncovering Wagner's dark history and sinister secrets.

== Cast and characters ==
=== Main ===
- Sinclair Daniel as Nella Rogers, an editorial assistant at Wagner Books who works for Vera. A book-smart and hard-working people pleaser, Nella is tired of being the only Black woman working at Wagner and gets excited when Hazel is hired.
- Ashleigh Murray as Hazel-May McCall, Wagner's newest employee who works as an assistant to Maisy. A confident and unapologetically Black Harlemite, Hazel encourages Nella to speak up about the injustices she notices at Wagner.
- Brittany Adebumola as Malaika, Nella's eccentric and openly queer best friend, who Nella often vents to
- Hunter Parrish as Owen, Nella's boyfriend of three years, who works as a middle school principal
- Bellamy Young as Vera Parini, an editor at Wagner Books and Nella's boss
- Eric McCormack as Richard Wagner, the founder and editor-in-chief of Wagner Books
  - Zachary Bostrom as Young Richard Wagner

=== Recurring ===
- Garcelle Beauvais as Diana Gordon, a world-renowned author best known for her 1988 novel Burning Heart, of which Nella and Hazel are huge fans
  - Shakirah DeMesier as Young Diana Gordon
- April Parker Jones as Kendra Rae Phillips, a Black former editor at Wagner Books. Kendra is a childhood friend of Diana who helps edit and publish Diana's novel Burning Heart. She later mysteriously disappears after an interview where she speaks out about racism in publishing.
  - Cassi Maddox as Young Kendra Rae Phillips
- Brian Baumgartner as Colin Franklin, a successful author who is Wagner's current cash cow
- Karina Willis as Shani Edmonds, a former co-worker of Hazel's from her previous job in Boston
- Alyshia Ochse as Maisy Glendower, an editor at Wagner Books who hires Hazel as her assistant
- Kate Owens as Sophie, a hipster who works at Wagner Books and often annoys Nella by trying to connect with her despite being ignorant to her struggles
- Langston Kerman as Jesse Watson, an outspoken activist and podcast host whom Nella admires

== Episodes ==
No.	Title	Directed by	Written by	Original release date
1	"They Say I'm Different"	Mariama Diallo	Zakiya Dalila Harris & Rashida Jones	September 13, 2023
2	"After the Storm"	Todd Biermann	Jordan Reddout & Gus Hickey	September 13, 2023
3	"I Know a Place"	Todd Biermann	Jordan Reddout & Gus Hickey	September 13, 2023
4	"What About Your Friends"	Nefertite Nguvu	Kara Brown	September 13, 2023
5	"Don't You Want Me"	Nefertite Nguvu	Caroline Williams	September 13, 2023
6	"Fake Smile"	Naima Ramos-Chapman	Kara Brown	September 13, 2023
7	"Caught in the Rapture"	Naima Ramos-Chapman	Angela Nissel	September 13, 2023
8	"The End of Love"	Aurora Guerrero	Kara Brown & Janelle Spence	September 13, 2023
9	"To Be Young, Gifted and Broke"	Mariama Diallo	Zakiya Dalila Harris	September 13, 2023
10	"Down with Disease"	Aurora Guerrero	Jordan Reddout & Gus Hickey	September 13, 2023

== Production ==
=== Development ===
In April 2020, Hulu won the rights to the novel The Other Black Girl by Zakiya Dalila Harris in a highly competitive bidding war and subsequently put a television adaptation of the novel into development. On August 4, 2022, the show received an official series order from Hulu. The series is produced by Onyx Collective and Temple Hill Entertainment, with Harris, Rashida Jones, Tara Duncan, Marty Bowen, Wyck Godfrey, Adam Fishbach, Jordan Reddout, and Gus Hickey serving as executive producers. Harris and Jones wrote the pilot episode and Mariama Diallo directed. Reddout and Hickey are co-showrunners of the series. Harris credited Jones as being "a champion and a force" for the series and noted that Jones' commitment to the series behind the scenes was crucial to it ultimately getting made. On May 10, 2024, the series was canceled after one season.

=== Writing ===
Harris said that adapting the novel for television was both the most difficult and the most rewarding creative challenge of her career, adding that the series allowed her to expand upon and reimagine her work for a visual medium. Harris stated that both the novel and the series were inspired by her own personal experiences in the workplace. Similarly to Nella's character, Harris worked at publishing company Penguin Random House for nearly three years, first as an editorial assistant and later as an assistant editor, and was the only Black woman in her office at the time. She sought to convey her feelings of isolation and the difficulties of being on the receiving end of microaggressions and misogynoir at work, as well as address the insecurities she had about her own Blackness while growing up. Harris acknowledged the importance of including comedic moments in her work by stating that laughing is cathartic for her and that she uses humor to cope with serious issues such as racism. She also said she did not want the tone of the story to be too didactic or self-righteous and that she wanted viewers to be able to take away something positive from the series despite the serious topics it addresses.

Harris noted Nella's journey in the story is symbolic of the pressures Black employees can feel to represent all Black people in the workplace. Nella's friendship with Hazel represents Black employees constantly being compared to and pitted against one another, which is a source of tension between Nella and Hazel. Harris said one of her biggest goals was ensuring the relationships and conversations between the Black women in the show felt authentic to the audience. She also incorporated messages about tokenism and code-switching into the story. Harris named Passing by Nella Larsen, Octavia E. Butler's Kindred, Toni Morrison's Sula, and Americanah by Chimamanda Ngozi Adichie as being some of her inspirations for The Other Black Girl. Additionally, she was inspired by horror, thriller, and science fiction films and series such as Get Out, Carrie, Rosemary's Baby, The Blob, Invasion of the Body Snatchers, Night of the Living Dead, Are You Afraid of the Dark?, The Twilight Zone, Severance, and Black Mirror.

=== Casting ===
On October 31, 2022, it was announced that Sinclair Daniel, Ashleigh Murray, Brittany Adebumola, and Hunter Parrish would be starring in the series. Three days later, it was revealed that Bellamy Young and Eric McCormack were also cast in starring roles. In December 2022, it was announced that Garcelle Beauvais, Brian Baumgartner, Alyshia Ochse, and Kate Owens had been cast in recurring roles. The next month, Shakirah DeMesier, Cassi Maddox, and Langston Kerman joined the cast in recurring capacities.

Harris explained how Daniel was chosen to play Nella, remarking how impressed she was with Daniel's initial audition. She said, "when I saw Sinclair [Daniel] I was just so blown away because she was able to convey so much on her face. Humor, despair, contemplativeness, in the span of milliseconds. I felt a deep empathy for her immediately. ... Sinclair [Daniel] is so charming." Daniel was attracted to the role of Nella because she related to Nella's experiences navigating predominantly white spaces as a Black woman and her journey of exploration into her own Blackness. She also appreciated the depth and complexity of the character and all the layers of Nella's personality that she was able to explore through playing her, adding that young Black female characters like Nella are not often seen in media. Murray was cast as Hazel after Harris and the rest of the show's production team saw her natural chemistry with Daniel and talked to her about what playing the role of Hazel would mean to her personally. Harris acknowledged the comedic talents of both Young and Owens and their ability to not take themselves too seriously, which led to the actresses being cast in the roles of Vera and Sophie.

=== Filming ===
Principal photography began on October 31, 2022, in Atlanta, Georgia, and concluded on February 13, 2023.

== Marketing and release ==
In July 2023, Hulu released first look images of the series and announced that all 10 episodes of the first season would premiere on September 13, 2023. On August 10, 2023, the first two episodes of the series were screened at the Martha's Vineyard African American Film Festival. The following week, Hulu unveiled the series' key art and released an official trailer. The series also premiered on September 13, 2023, on Star+ in Latin America and Disney+ in various other international countries including the United Kingdom, Ireland, Canada, Australia, New Zealand, Japan, South Africa, and Germany. In India and Southeast Asia, the series premiered on Disney+ Hotstar on September 15, 2023.

== Reception ==
=== Viewership ===
TVision, using its Power Score to evaluate CTV programming through viewership and engagement across more than 1,000 apps, reported that The Other Black Girl ranked was among the twenty most-streamed series for the week of September 11. The show reached No. 3 on Hulu's "Top 15 Today" list—a daily updated list of the platform's most-watched titles—on September 14. TVision later announced that The Other Black Girl was the eighth most-streamed series between September 11–17.

=== Critical response ===
The review aggregator website Rotten Tomatoes reported an 86% approval rating with an average rating of 7.2/10, based on 42 critic reviews. The website's critical consensus reads, "A clever spin on the pressures of office culture, The Other Black Girl blends comedy and horror to thrilling effect." Metacritic, which uses a weighted average, assigned a score of 68 out of 100 based on 21 critics, indicating "generally favorable reviews".

Variety's Aramide Tinubu called the series "clever" and the cast "engaging", naming Murray and the "hilariously brash" Adebumola as standouts. She said the story being told from the perspective of Black women "offers something entirely unique to the genre" and praised the show for its handling of "weighty" topics by remarking, "The series speaks to feelings of othering, powerlessness and kinship." LaNeysha Campbell of But Why Tho? gave the series a rating of 7.5/10 and praised the depth and nuance of the characters and their relationships, as well as the series' realistic and relatable portrayal of the struggles and racism Black women face in the workplace. She highlighted Daniel and Murray's performances as well as Beauvais for her "dynamic" supporting role. Campbell wrote, "The Other Black Girl delves deep into the complexities of identity, privilege, and the intricate dynamics that can exist among Black women in a predominantly white space. ... Compelling performances and a willingness to explore some messy yet essential themes make it captivating and socially relevant." Bethonie Butler of The Washington Post stated, "Black women still work in environments where they are told to be confident (but not too confident) and that consistently undervalue their talent, expertise and financial worth. The Other Black Girl zeroes in on the absurdity of it all, but also the complexities."

Coleman Spilde of The Daily Beast praised the series' overall entertainment value and pacing, the "magnetic" performances of the cast, and the chemistry between Daniel and Murray. He commended the series for delivering social commentary without taking itself too seriously or losing focus of the plot's thrills and mystery and named it "one of the upcoming Halloween season's best binges." New York Post's Lauren Sarner called the series a "winning mix of suspense and satire" and an "engrossing genre-bending thriller". Collider's Carly Lane gave the series a "B+" rating and described it as "the perfect binge for those who want a twisty genre tale, anchored by compelling characters and a mystery that's as timeless as it is timely" and lauded the series for enriching and expanding upon Harris' original novel. Sherin Nicole of Geek Girl Riot described the series' performances, aesthetics, and storytelling as "riveting" and added that the story will resonate with Black women. She wrote, "This series combines thrills, scares, and giggles with a sense of something sinister lurking in the shadows. Watch it as fast as you can."

Kathryn Porter of Paste Magazine gave the series a rating of 8.5/10 and acclaimed Daniel and Murray's "effortless and effective" performances along with their on-screen chemistry, while additionally praising Adebumola and Young for their comedic roles. She reacted positively to the character's backstories, but said the series' blend of genres led to an inconsistent tone at times. Overall, she wrote: "The casting is incredible, the lead characters are two very complex Black women, and when the show is funny, it’s really funny." Christina Izzo of The A.V. Club gave the series a "B" rating and acclaimed Daniel's performance and the series' depictions of racism, misogynoir, microaggressions, and tokenism but criticized the show's final twist. She wrote, "the workplace satire is far richer than the spooky stuff, and there’s real horror in witnessing Black ambition struggle within white-collar systems. ... The cast, however, is captivating and charming enough to smooth over even the most jarring of genre stumbles." On the other hand, The Arizona Republic's Bill Goodykoontz called the series' mix of genres one of its strengths and stated: "The Other Black Girl is all over the place in terms of genre and all the better for it."

=== Accolades ===
The Other Black Girl was a recipient of the Critics Choice Association's Seal of Female Empowerment in Entertainment (SOFEE), which "recognizes outstanding new films and television series that illuminate the female experience and perspective through authentically told female-driven stories."

Year	Award	Category	Nominee(s)	Result	Ref.
2024	Black Reel TV Awards	Outstanding Directing in a TV Movie or Limited Series	Mariama Diallo (for "To Be Young, Gifted and Broke")	Nominated	
2024	Black Reel TV Awards	Outstanding Lead Performance in a TV Movie or Limited Series	Ashleigh Murray	Nominated	
2024	Black Reel TV Awards	Outstanding TV Movie or Limited Series	The Other Black Girl	Nominated	
2024	GLAAD Media Awards	Outstanding New TV Series	The Other Black Girl	Nominated	
2024	Golden Trailer Awards	Best Action/Thriller TrailerByte for a TV/Streaming Series	"Wagner D&I" (Buddha Jones)	Nominated	
2024	Golden Trailer Awards	Best Comedy/Drama TrailerByte for a TV/Streaming Series	"Wagner D&I" (Buddha Jones)	Nominated	
2024	Gracie Awards	Outstanding Writing – Scripted Television	Zakiya Dalila Harris and Rashida Jones	Won	
2024	NAACP Image Awards	Outstanding Original Score for TV/Film	EmmoLei Sankofa	Nominated	
2024	NAMIC Vision Awards	Best Performance – Comedy	Brittany Adebumola	Nominated	
2024	NAMIC Vision Awards	Best Performance – Comedy	Ashleigh Murray	Won	
