= Bellamy Young =

American actress, singer (born 1970)

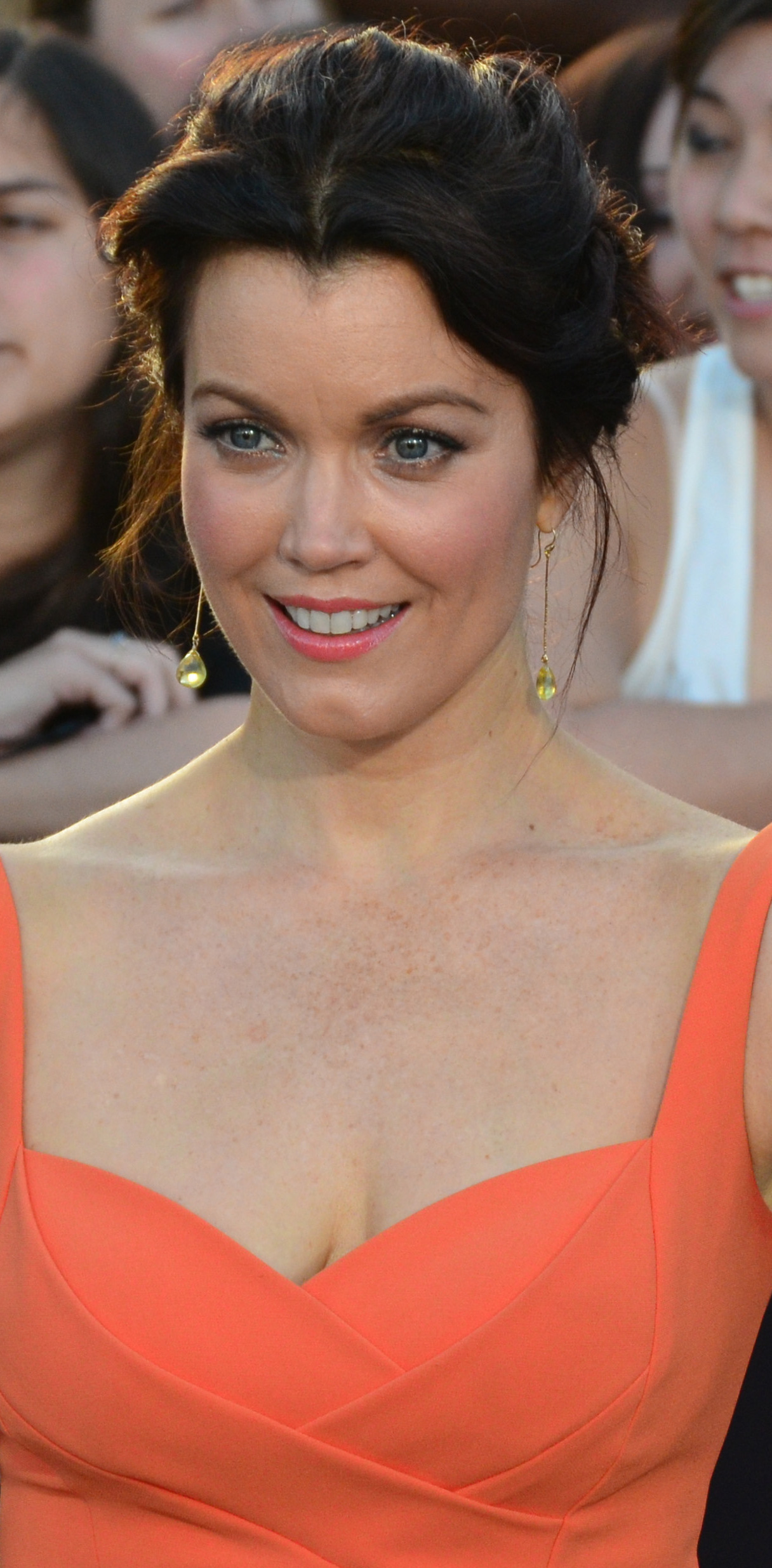
- Young at the premiere of Divergent in 2014
- Born: Amy Maria Young; February 19, 1970 (age 56); Asheville, North Carolina, U.S.
- Education: Yale University (BA)
- Occupations: Actress, producer, singer
- Years active: 1994–present
- Spouse: Pedro Segundo (m. 2020)
- Website: bellamyyoung.com

Bellamy Young (born Amy Maria Young; February 19, 1970) is an American actress, producer and singer best known as Melody "Mellie" Grant on Scandal (2012–2018), for which she won the Critics' Choice Television Award for Best Supporting Actress in a Drama Series in 2014. She also starred in Prodigal Son as Jessica Whitly (2019–2021) and as Hotch's girlfriend Beth Clemmons on Criminal Minds.

== Early life and education ==
Young was born as Amy Maria Young on February 19, 1970, in Asheville, North Carolina, and was adopted. She changed her name to join the Screen Actors Guild since there was another Amy Young registered, and chose the name Bellamy as a tribute to her late father's best friend, Bill, who had helped to raise her after her father died.

Young graduated from Asheville High School in 1987. She attended Yale University, initially majoring in physics but studying English and theatre, and graduated in 1991. She spent a summer during college at the British American Drama Academy in England.

== Career ==
=== 1995–2011: Beginnings ===
Young began her acting career in theatre. In 1997, she made her Broadway debut as Mary in the original cast of The Life. She has also appeared Off-Broadway in Stephen Sondheim's musical Merrily We Roll Along (1994), and Randy Newman's Faust (1995–1996). In 1995, she made her television debut in a recurring role on the NBC daytime soap opera Another World as Dr. Courtney Evans. She guest-starred on Law & Order in 1997 and 1998, in two different roles. In 1999 she made her film debut with a small role in the crime drama Black and White and later co-starred in several independent films. In the early 2000s, she began appearing in guest-starring roles on a number of television dramas and comedies, including The Drew Carey Show, The X-Files, ER, Frasier, The West Wing, NCIS, Medium, Grey's Anatomy, Private Practice, Two and a Half Men, Supernatural, Drop Dead Diva, and Castle. From 2000 to 2011, Young made over 30 guest appearances on television shows.

Young was a regular cast member in the USA Network series Peacemakers in 2003. The show was cancelled after one season of nine episodes. She had recurring roles in the Lifetime legal drama series For the People as Deputy Dist. Atty. Agnes Hunt in 2002, on NBC period drama American Dreams as Diane Shaw in 2003, on NBC's Scrubs as Dr. Grace Miller in 2004, as Assistant State Attorney Monica West on CBS's CSI: Miami (2005–206), and on ABC primetime soap opera Dirty Sexy Money (2008–2009) as Ellen Darling, the eldest daughter-in-law of the Darling family. She also had a recurring role in Criminal Minds as Beth Clemmons from 2011 to 2013.

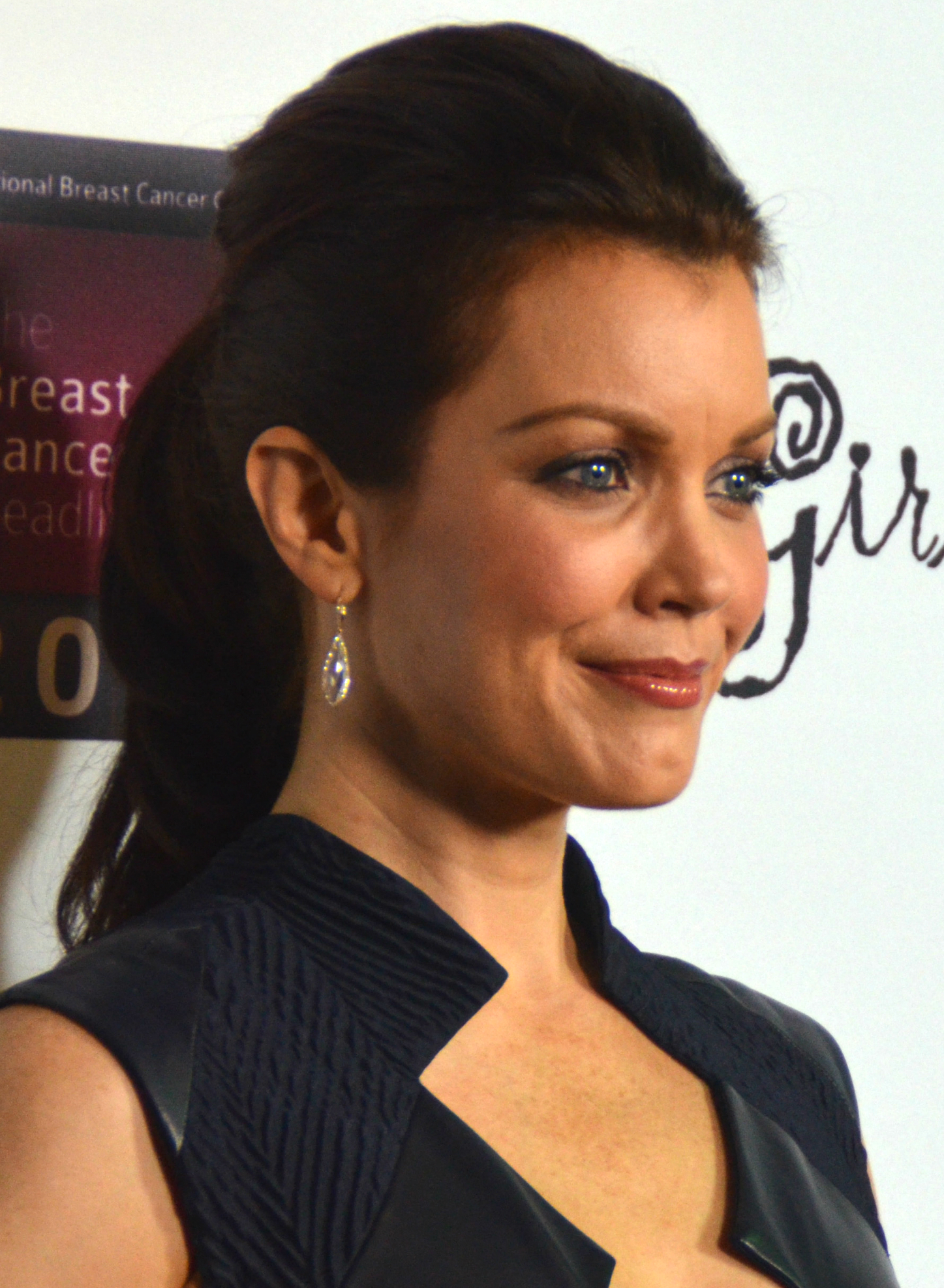
Young at an event in October 2014

Young has appeared in supporting roles in a number of films, including We Were Soldiers (2002) and Mission: Impossible III (2006), along with independent movies like Larceny (2004), Eve of Understanding (2006), Trust Me (2007), This Is Not a Test (2008), In My Sleep (2010), The Freebie (2010), and Joint Body (2014).

=== 2012–2018: Scandal ===
In 2011 Shonda Rhimes cast Young in the recurring role of First Lady, then 2016 Republican presidential nominee, Melody "Mellie" Grant on the ABC political thriller television series Scandal opposite Kerry Washington and Tony Goldwyn. Before Scandal, Young appeared in Shonda Rhimes' Grey's Anatomy and Private Practice. She appeared in every episode of the first season of Scandal and was upgraded to a series regular in season two. She later said that her part was originally conceived as a three episode arc. Young has received critical acclaim for her performance as Melody Grant throughout her time on the show. The Daily Beast named her the "Breakout Star" of the show in 2014. Many critics praised Young's performance in her character's centered episode "Everything's Coming Up Mellie" of the third season. Cicely K. Dyson's review for The Wall Street Journal states: "Bellamy Young has been an amazing scene stealer for two-and-a-half seasons, and this time she finally got her chance to shine." Robert Rorke, writing for The New York Post states, "In Mellie, the show has its most fleshed-out character and in Young, its most compelling performer." She won a Critics' Choice Television Award for Best Supporting Actress in a Drama Series for her performance in season three.

On May 15, 2015, Young released her first album, Far Away So Close, on iTunes. In 2016, she starred in the crime drama film The Night Stalker directed by Megan Griffiths about the serial killer Richard Ramirez. The following year, she had a supporting role in the independent comedy film Bernard and Huey opposite Jim Rash and David Koechner. In 2018, she co-starred in Disney's live action adaptation of A Wrinkle in Time, along with Oprah Winfrey, Reese Witherspoon, and Mindy Kaling. Also that year, she played a leading role in the ABC comedy-drama pilot False Profits.

=== 2019–present ===
In March 2019, Young announced that she would be co-starring in the Fox drama pilot Prodigal Son opposite Michael Sheen, Lou Diamond Phillips, and Tom Payne. In May, the show was green-lit for a series order and by October, had been picked up for a full 22-episode season order . Prodigal Son was the first full season order of fall 2019 and was the highest-rated new show on any network. Young guest-starred in the ABC crime drama Whiskey Cavalier and Netflix anthology Dolly Parton's Heartstrings in 2019. In 2021, she guest-starred in the first episode of Fox series, Fantasy Island and starred in the CW reboot of The Waltons' Homecoming playing the role of Olivia Walton.

In 2022, Young starred in the ABC family drama series Promised Land, playing villainous Margaret Honeycroft. The series was canceled after one season. In November 2022, she was cast in the Hulu mystery thriller series The Other Black Girl, a television adaptation of the 2021 novel by Zakiya Dalila Harris. She also reprised her role as Olivia Walton in The Waltons' Thanksgiving. She has been the spokesperson for Salix Pharmaceuticals' Xifaxan since May 9, 2024. Her father suffered from overt hepatic encephalopathy (OHE) during her adolescence.

== Personal life ==
Young has been vegan since 1988 and in 2016 participated in a campaign for PETA titled, "Being Vegan Keeps Me Young". A long time supporter of shelter adoption, Young starred in two televised adverts for The Humane Society of the United States: 'The Shelter Pet Project' in 2015 and 'Honestly' in 2016.

Young began dating Portuguese percussionist Pedro Segundo in September 2017. During COVID-19 pandemic in 2020, Young and Segundo married.

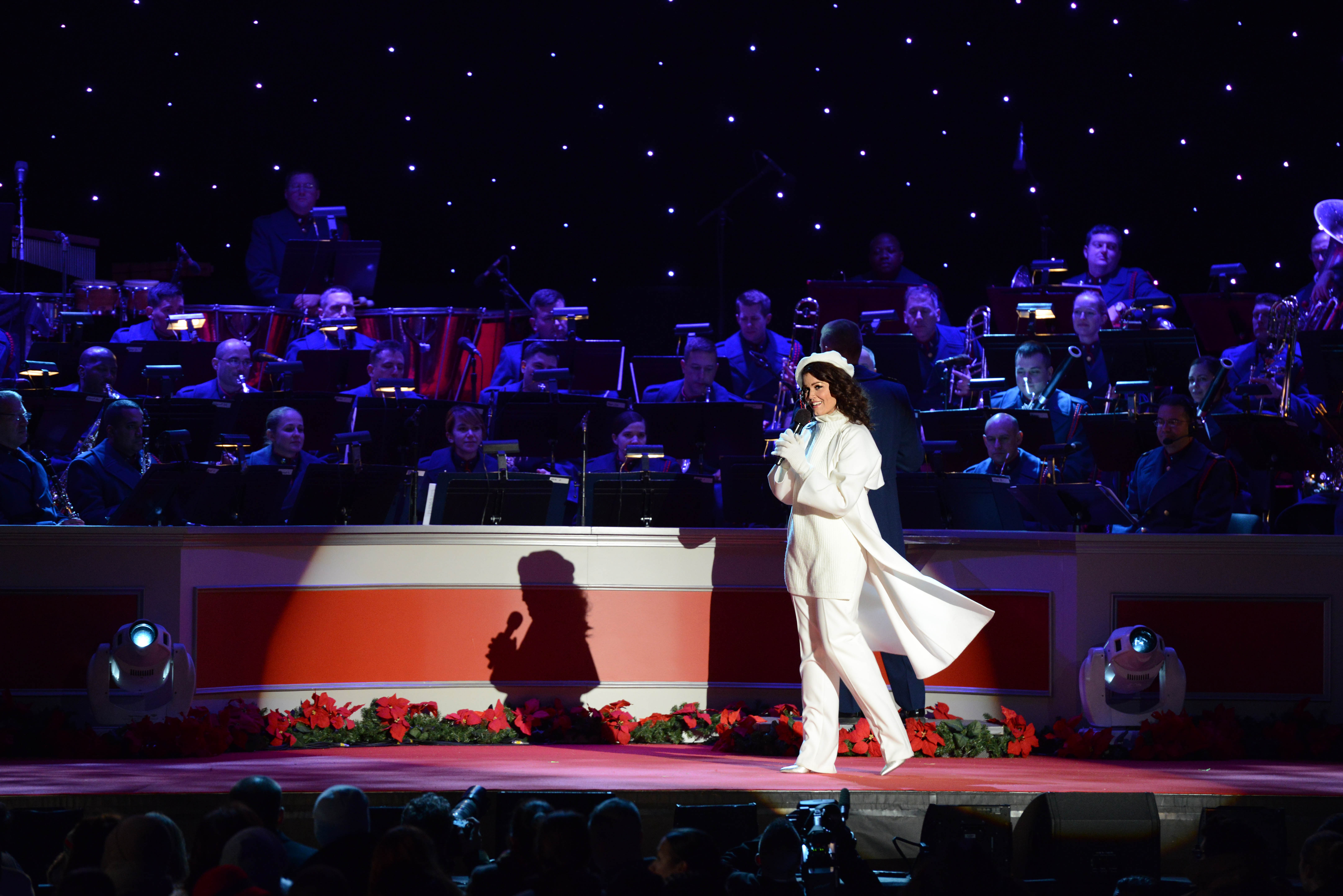
Young performing at the National Christmas Tree Lighting in Washington, D.C. in December 2015

Young is a registered Democrat. Along with several of her Scandal cast mates, Young headlined at a fundraiser event for Hillary Clinton in April 2016. From August through November 2016, Young hit the campaign trail for Clinton and visited several states. As part of the Obama administration legacy, in 2016, Young appeared in 'Women Film' by The United States of Women along with several other public figures. After performing at the 2015 National Christmas Tree Lighting, it was announced that in 2016 Young would be co-ambassador, along with Chelsea Clinton, of the Trust for the National Mall.

A scholarship student herself, Young now endows a scholarship each year to a student at her alma mater, Yale University. In 2019, she became an ambassador for the organization CARE and has continued to partner with the organisation. For International Women's Day 2020, Young directed a PSA, for CARE; she appears as well as Kerry Washington, Shonda Rhimes, and Katie Lowes.

== Filmography ==
=== Film ===
Year	Title	Role	Notes
1999	Black and White	Bellamy	Uncredited
1999	Picture This	Monique	
2001	Mission	Sandy	
2002	Swatters	Mary Dolan	
2002	We Were Soldiers	Catherine Metsker	
2004	Larceny	Kiki	
2005	Darcy's Off-White Wedding	Donatella	Short film
2006	Eve of Understanding	Cassie	
2006	Mission: Impossible III	Rachael	
2007	Simple Things	Terry Hudson	Also executive producer
2007	Trust Me	Carrie	
2008	One, Two, Many	Jennifer	
2008	This Is Not a Test	Teresa	
2009	Tender as Hellfire	Cheryl	Short film
2010	The Freebie	Jessica	
2010	In My Sleep	Olivia	
2010	Pound of Flesh	Daniella Melville	
2011	Joint Body	Jane Chapman	
2012	Last Day on Earth	Pamala	
2012	The Cottage	Annie	Also executive producer
2015	Day Out of Days	Rebecca	
2016	Offer & Compromise	Karen	
2016	The Night Stalker	Kit Fellows	
2017	Bernard and Huey	Aggie	
2018	A Wrinkle in Time	Camazotz Woman	
2020	Superman: Man of Tomorrow	Martha Kent (voice)	

=== Television ===
Year	Title	Role	Notes
1995	Another World	Dr. Courtney Evans	Recurring role
1997	Law & Order	Ellen O'Brien	Episode: "Blood"
1998	Law & Order	Stephanie Harker	Episode: "True North"
2000	The Drew Carey Show	Bridget	Episode: "The Gang Stops Drinking"
2000	Nash Bridges	Diana Carr	Episode: "The Messenger"
2000	The X-Files	Attorney Janet Wilson	Episode: "Redrum"
2001	The District	Bethany Fortoro	Episode: "To Serve and Protect"
2001	ER	Grace	Episode: "If I Should Fall from Grace"
2002	Frasier	Lisa	Episode: "Three Blind Dates"
2002	For the People	Deputy Dist. Atty. Agnes Hunt	Recurring role
2003	Peacemakers	Twyla Gentry	Main cast
2003	American Dreams	Diane Shaw	3 episodes
2004	The West Wing	MaryLou Meriwether	Episode: "The Stormy Present"
2004	NCIS	A.T.F. Special Agent Melinda Stone	Episode: "Split Decision"
2004, 2009	Scrubs	Dr. Miller	Recurring role (season 3), 1 episode (season 8)
2004	Strong Medicine	Erin Berman	Episode: "Code"
2005	North Shore	Mrs. Lasser	Episode: "Shark"
2005	Medium	Kate Emery	Episode: "Judge, Jury and Executioner"
2005	Vision of a Murder	Tina Moore	TV movie
2005–2006	CSI: Miami	Assistant State Attorney Monica West	Recurring role
2007	Close to Home	Sarah Paulson	Episode: "Road Rage"
2007	Grey's Anatomy	Kathy	2 episodes: "The Other Side of This Life: Parts 1 & 2"
2007	Boston Legal	Cynthia Nichols	Episode: "Beauty and the Beast"
2007	Cold Case	Audrey Metz (1938)	Episode: "World's End"
2007–2008	Dirty Sexy Money	Ellen Darling	Recurring role
2008	Two and a Half Men	Diane	Episode: "The Mooch at the Boo"
2008	Mask of the Ninja	Gina	TV movie
2008–2009	Knight Rider	Amy Clark	TV movie
2009	Trust Me	Carrie Taylor	Episode: "But Wait, There's More"
2009	Ghost Whisperer	Lucy Stanton	Episode: "Cursed"
2009	Supernatural	Sarah / Lucifer	Episode: "Sympathy for the Devil"
2010	Edgar Floats	Jennifer Wade	TV pilot
2010	Drop Dead Diva	Emily Parcellas	Episode: "The Long Road to Napa"
2010	The Mentalist	Melanie Ayers	Episode: "Cackle-Bladder-Blood"
2010	Law & Order: LA	Monica Jarrow	Episode: "Playa Vista"
2011	Working Class	Brooke	Episode: "The Dance"
2011	United States of Tara	Bridgette	2 episodes
2011	Castle	Candace Ford	Episode: "Pretty Dead"
2011	The Protector	Skylar Brenn	Episode: "Wings"
2011–2013	Criminal Minds	Beth Clemmons	Recurring role
2012	Franklin & Bash	Margaret Pollack	Episode: "L'affaire Du Coeur"
2012–2018	Scandal	Melody "Mellie" Grant	Recurring role (season 1), main cast (seasons 2-7); Critics' Choice Television Award for Best Supporting Actress in a Drama Series (2014)
2014	Hell's Kitchen	Herself	Episode: "5 Chefs Compete"
2015	Jeopardy!	Herself	Celebrity contestant
2017	Lip Sync Battle	Herself	Episode: "Matt McGorry vs. Bellamy Young"
2019	Whiskey Cavalier	Karen Pappas	Episode: "The Czech List"
2019	Dolly Parton's Heartstrings	Myrna Jorgensen	Episode: "Down from Dover"
2019–2021	Prodigal Son	Jessica Whitly	Main cast
2021	The Waltons: Homecoming	Olivia Walton	TV movie
2021	Fantasy Island	Christine Collins	Episode: "Hungry Christine/Mel Loves Ruby"
2022	Promised Land	Margaret Honeycroft	Main cast
2022	A Waltons Thanksgiving	Olivia Walton	TV movie
2023	The Other Black Girl	Vera Parini	Main cast
2025–2026	Brilliant Minds	Dr. Amelia Frederick	Recurring role

== Theater ==
Year	Production	Role	Notes
1997	The Life	Mary	Ethel Barrymore Theatre
