= TTU K–12 =

School program in Texas

Coordinates: 33.584°N 101.878°W

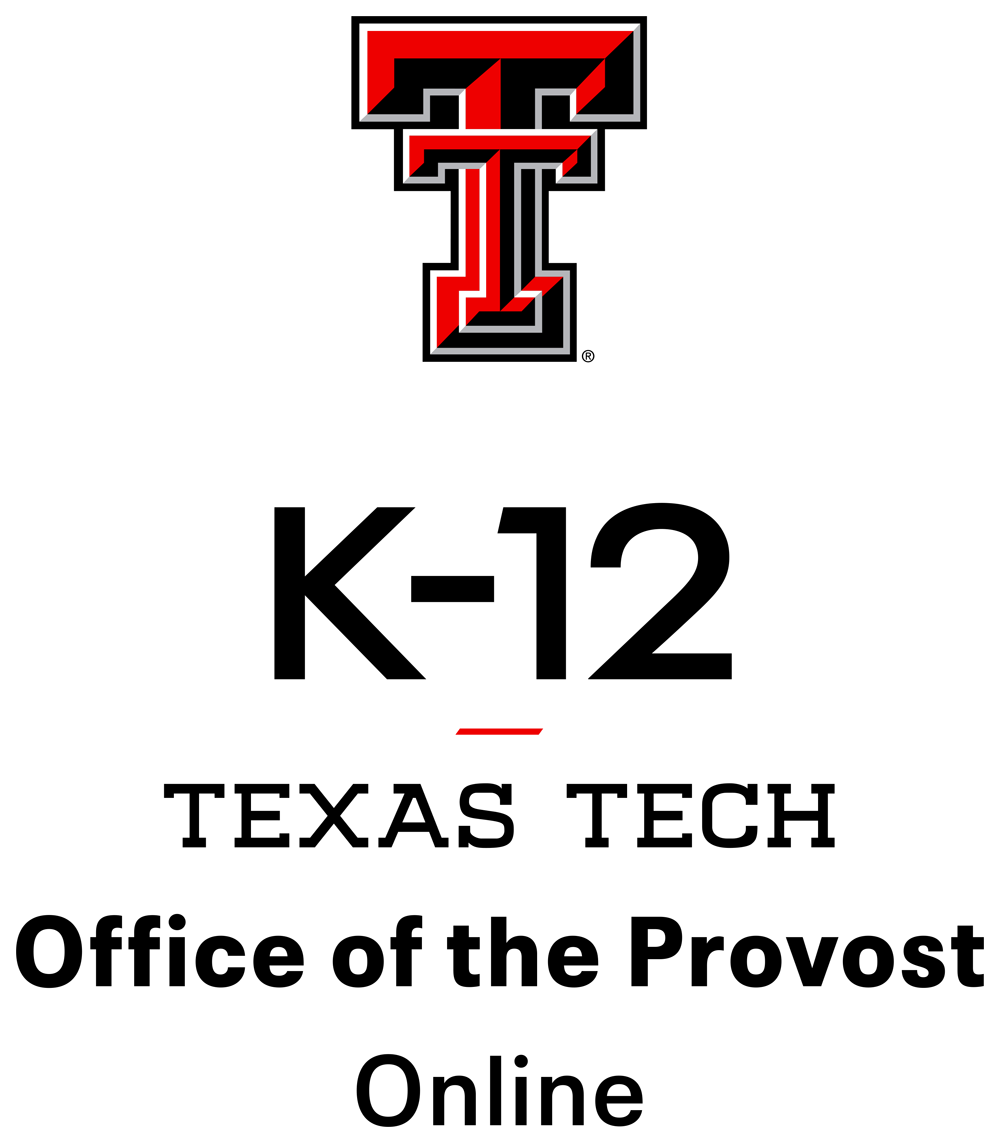
Texas Tech K-12
- Tech Plaza; Texas Tech University; 1901 University Ave; Lubbock, Texas 79409

Information
- Established: 1993
- Grades: K-12
- Enrollment: Approximately 3,500 full-time students
- Information: +1 (806) 464-4173; 1 (800) 692-6877
- Website: TTU K-12

Texas Tech K-12 is an approved learning school from kindergarten through twelfth grade program in Texas, offering high school diplomas. It is operated by Texas Tech University, which is located in Lubbock. Texas Tech K-12 offers individual courses (supplemental), credit by exams (CBEs), homeschool curriculum, bulk testing services, and a full-time Texas Diploma Program that includes high school, middle school and elementary school.

== History ==
Texas Tech K-12 was established by legislative and state board action in 1993 as a "Special Purpose District" designed to educate students with special circumstances and whose educational needs were not adequately met by traditional schools. In 1998, the Commissioner of Education granted expansion of the program to include kindergarten through 8th grade. Texas Tech K-12 now serves students in kindergarten through 12th grade.

== Enrollment ==
In 1994, the first graduating class from Texas Tech K-12 consisted of only two students. Now, Texas Tech K-12 has a total enrollment of around 1,500 full-time students among high school, middle school and elementary school students. Texas Tech K-12 graduated more than 125 students in the class of 2023-2024 and had served more than 415,000 students in over 70 countries by the end of that academic year.

Students can enroll in courses through Texas Tech K-12's full-time diploma-seeking program, where students take all the state-required courses and assessments to graduate. Upon graduation, students receive a Texas high school diploma.

Another option is the supplemental program. Students can catch up or get ahead by taking individual courses or credit by exams while still enrolled in their current school district.

== Transfer credits ==
All credits earned through Texas Tech K-12 are recognized by colleges and universities.

== Accreditation ==
Texas Tech K-12 is accredited by the Texas Education Agency (TEA). Courses and credit by exams (CBEs) are aligned with the Texas Essential Knowledge and Skills (TEKS). The high school courses are approved by the NCAA.

== Notable students ==
Texas Tech K-12 serves a variety of people including actors, singers, dancers, athletes, military families, families who travel often, non-traditional students, families living overseas, homeschool families, adults finishing high school, hospital/homebound students, students struggling in traditional school and anyone looking for an accredited school without attending a physical location.

Notable students include:

- Ashley Cain – figure skater, Texas Tech K-12 Class of 2015
- Mohana Krishnan – actress, plays Tammy Gilmore on Nickelodeon's I Am Frankie
- Sarah LeMaire – actress, plays Sarah Moody on the television show Wannabes
- Jordan Malone – Olympic speed skater
- Hunter Parrish – actor
- Jesse Plemons – Emmy-nominated actor, played Landry Clarke on the television show Friday Night Lights and Robert Daly on the USS Callister episode of Black Mirror
- Leven Rambin – actor (All My Children, Terminator: The Sarah Connor Chronicles); was enrolled and scheduled to graduate in 2008
- Jeremy Shuler – 12-year-old who enrolled in Cornell University’s engineering school
- Jessica Simpson – singer and actress

== See also ==
- Texas Tech University
