= Linda Holmes (writer) =

American writer, critic, and podcaster

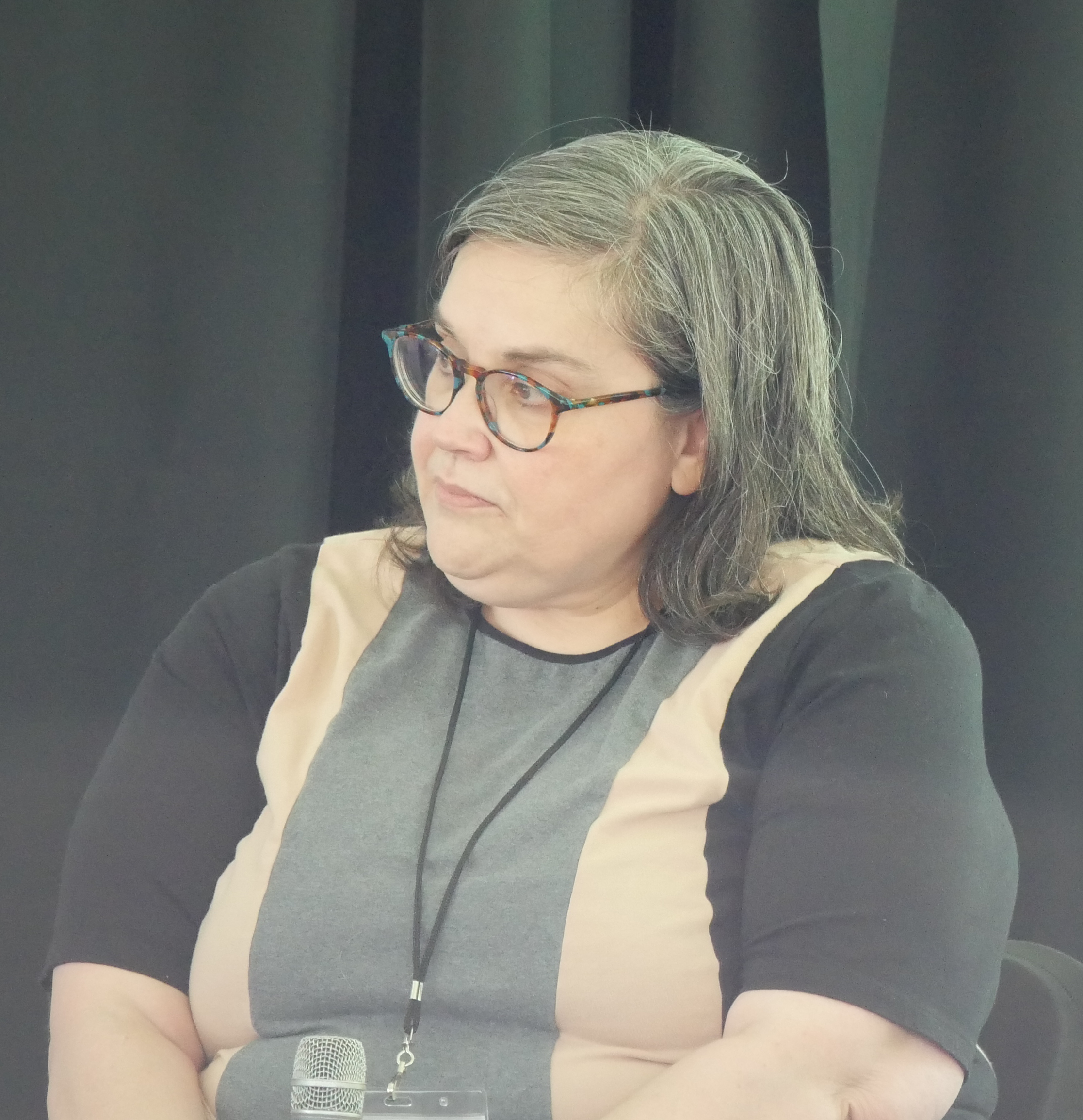
- Education: Oberlin College; Lewis & Clark Law School
- Occupation: Writer
- Website: thisislindaholmes.com

Linda Holmes is an American author, cultural critic, and podcaster. She currently writes for NPR and hosts their podcast and edits the blog both entitled Pop Culture Happy Hour. She has also written five books, the first being the self help book Why You're Still Single (2006), followed by three romance novels.

== Career ==
While working for the Minnesota legislature, Holmes began writing about television and film in her free time for sites like Television Without Pity, Vulture.com and MSNBC. In 2007, she left her legal job and moved to New York City to dedicate her time to writing and criticism. One year later, she was hired to cover pop culture for NPR.

She currently writes for NPR and hosts their podcast Pop Culture Happy Hour with Stephen Thompson, Glen Weldon, and Aisha Harris. Holmes also edits the Pop Culture Happy Hour blog on NPR, which was originally called Monkey See.

In 2019, Holmes published her first novel, Evvie Drake Starts Over, which earned a starred Kirkus Reviews review and was selected by The Today Show as a summer Read with Jenna book club pick. The novel tells the story of recently widowed Eveleth "Evvie" Drake and her unexpected friendship with Dean Tenney, former Major League pitcher.

== Personal life ==
Originally from Wilmington, Delaware, Holmes attended Oberlin College from 1989 to 1993. While there, she took a class on constitutional law that inspired her to go to law school. She enrolled at Lewis & Clark Law School in Portland, Oregon, graduating in 1997 and practicing law in Minnesota until 2007. Holmes is a advocate for body positivity and has written extensively about her dealings with depression and body image, specifically her experience with childhood obesity and continued issues with exercising and weight loss.

== Bibliography ==
- Why You're Still Single. Plume, 2006. ISBN 9780452287389, OCLC 62858052
- The Best of Pop Culture Happy Hour. Highbridge Co, 2015. ISBN 9781622318698, OCLC 907156365
- Evvie Drake Starts Over: A Novel. Ballantine Books, 2019. OCLC 1104481443 (E-book). Hodder & Stoughton; paperback, 2020. ISBN 9781473679276, OCLC 1090375416.
- Flying Solo: A Novel. Ballantine Books, 2022. ISBN 9780525619277 (hardcover).
- Back After This: A Novel. Random House Publishing Group, 2025. ISBN 9780593599259
