= 4400 (TV series) =

2021 American science fiction television series

- Genre: Science fiction; Drama; Mystery
- Based on: The 4400 by: René Echevarria; Scott Peters
- Developed by: Ariana Jackson
- Starring: Brittany Adebumola; Joseph David-Jones; Ireon Roach; TL Thompson; Jaye Ladymore; Derrick A. King; Khailah Johnson; Cory Jeacoma; AMARR; Autumn Best
- Music by: Jongnic Bontemps
- Country of origin: United States
- Original language: English
- No. of seasons: 1
- No. of episodes: 13

Production
- Executive producers: Anna Fricke; Laura Terry; Sunil Nayar; Ariana Jackson
- Producers: Maureen Milligan; David Roessell; Ashley Sims; John Forrest Niss
- Cinematography: Christopher Baffa; Scott Thiele
- Editors: Eli Nilsen; Peggy Tachdjian; Leah Breuer; Nathan Easterling
- Production companies: On the Porch; Pursued by a Bear; CBS Studios

Original release
- Network: The CW
- Release: October 25, 2021 – February 14, 2022

4400 (pronounced "forty-four hundred") is an American science fiction mystery drama television series developed by Ariana Jackson. The series is a reboot of the 2004 television series The 4400. It premiered on October 25, 2021, on the CW and concluded on February 14, 2022. In May 2022, the series was canceled after one season.

== Premise ==
Forty-four hundred people who vanished without a trace over the last century all make a sudden return, having not aged a single day and with no memory of what happened to them.

== Cast and characters ==
=== Main ===
- Brittany Adebumola as Shanice Murray, a lawyer who disappeared in 2005 who upon her return has empathic and telepathic powers. She is Logan's wife and Mariah's mother. Her powers are later removed by Rev.
- Joseph David-Jones as Jharrel Mateo, a social worker helping the 4400 reintegrate. He hopes that his brother, Manny, may be one of the 4400.
- Ireon Roach as Keisha Taylor, a parole officer whose sister was killed as a bystander in a shooting
- TL Thompson as Andre Davis, a physician who ran a clinic in 1920s Harlem before he was taken. He is enthusiastic about learning more about modern medicine. He was a part of a thriving Black queer/trans community in 1920s Harlem. In the 1920s, he lacked the language to identify himself, but meeting Noah allowed him to learn about modern gender identification. He came out to Shanice Murray when he also told her that he had feelings for her. It is revealed that Andre can heal people upon touching them but needs to transfer the sickness to another person otherwise he suffers.
- Jaye Ladymore as Claudette Williams, a housewife from 1958 who was also an organizer of the Civil Rights Movement and, who upon her return, has regenerative powers
- Derrick A. King as Isaiah "Rev" Johnston, a second-generation reverend from 1990s Chicago. He thinks that he was taken as a sign from God. Before he was taken he had doubts about his father's church, which he was poised to take over. He had a girlfriend, who was pregnant, that he intended to marry, against his father's wishes. He discovers that his father benefited from his disappearance, and that his son was disowned for being gay. It is revealed he has the ability to permanently nullify the powers of other 4400 after he physically touches them. If he's severely wounded, the nullified powers of the 4400 are returned to them.
- Khailah Johnson as LaDonna Landry, an intelligent rich party girl who was in a reality show from 2015 who upon her return has the power of illusion. It was revealed that she had fallen from a high-rise balcony before being taken. Her mother told people that she was in rehab.
- Cory Jeacoma as Logan Kaminski, Shanice's husband and Mariah's father, he is now remarried as he thought Shanice had abandoned them
- Amarr Wooten as Hayden Turner, a mysterious teenage member of the 4400 who upon his return can see the future. He was taken from a jail/asylum in the mid- to late 1940s.
- Autumn Best as Mildred Bell, a teen from a cult in the 1970s who upon her return has telekinetic powers. Her powers are inadvertently taken upon being touched by Rev, who has just come into his powers.

=== Recurring ===
- Wilder Yari as Jessica Tanner, the agent in charge of the 4400 and Keisha's girlfriend
- Kausar Mohammed as Soraya, a quirky technical expert employed by the government to help monitor the 4400
- Theo Germaine as Noah Harris, one of the 4400, who upon their return came back with hypnotic singing powers. He came out to Andre Davis but was taken away by the police officers right before press was allowed in to see the facility.
- Vinh Nguyen as Steve Miller, a sympathetic guard at the 4400 facility (the Bois Blanc Hotel) that the main characters are quarantined in
- Zachary Keller as Ken King, a vicious guard at the 4400 facility (the Bois Blanc Hotel) that the main characters are quarantined in
- Sophia Echendu as Mariah Kaminski, Shanice and Logan's daughter
- Clare Cooney as Bridget Templeton, Logan's wife and Mariah's step-mother
- Adilah Barnes as Mrs. Grover, an old family friend of Shanice who helps update Shanice and Claudette about what has happened between their disappearances and present day
- Anji White as Loretta Landry, LaDonna's overbearing mother who had her own reality show that LaDonna's was a spin-off from. She believes fame is more important than anything.
- Chris Johnson as Bill Greene, the government liaison and new agent in charge of the 4400
- Calvin Seabrooks as Manny Campos, Jharrel's brother who is a member of the 4400. Upon his return, he can turn himself invisible.
- Raven Whitley as Millicent Bell, Mildred's sister who is a member of the 4400. Upon her return, she can turn her lower arm(s) into metal.

=== Guest stars ===
- Patrick Flueger as Caleb
- Tim Russ as LaDonna Landry's father

== Episodes ==
No.	Title	Directed by	Written by	Original release date	U.S. viewers (millions)
1	"Past Is Prologue"	Janice Cooke	Ariana Jackson	October 25, 2021	0.54
2	"All Things Are Possible"	Janice Cooke	Ariana Jackson	November 1, 2021	0.36
3	"That LaDonna Life"	Sheelin Choksey	Kristen SaBerre	November 8, 2021	0.35
4	"Harlem's Renaissance Man"	Tessa Blake	Jett Garrison	November 15, 2021	0.44
5	"The Way We Were"	Avi Youabian	Ashley Sims	November 22, 2021	0.35
6	"If You Love Something"	Rachel Raimist	Shomari Kirkwood	November 29, 2021	0.34
7	"Empowered Women Empower Women"	Kenny Leon	Felicia Hilario	December 6, 2021	0.34
8	"The Kaminski Experiment"	Janice Cooke	Taylor Townsend	December 13, 2021	0.40
9	"Great Expectations"	Rob Greenlea	Mia Katherine Iverson	January 17, 2022	0.45
10	"Give Up the Ghost"	Ayoka Chenzira	Bradley Estrin-Barks	January 24, 2022	0.36
11	"You Only Meant Well"	Daniel Willis	Jackie Decembly	January 31, 2022	0.31
12	"Group Efforts"	Scott Peters	Sunil Nayar	February 7, 2022	0.34
13	"Present Is Prologue"	Cheryl Dunye	Ariana Jackson & Sunil Nayar	February 14, 2022	0.23

== Production ==
=== Development ===
On November 7, 2018, it was announced that the CW was developing a reboot of the 2004 series The 4400. Taylor Elmore and Craig Sweeney were attached to develop, co-write, and serve as executive producers of the pilot under their overall deals with CBS Studios, with Elmore also announced as the potential showrunner. The project was subsequently moved to the next season's development cycle on February 8, 2019, with the project being redeveloped for the 2020–21 television season as it was reported that scripts were not ready in time.

On February 9, 2021, it was announced that the project had been given a straight-to-series order. The new iteration was developed by Ariana Jackson. Jackson and Anna Fricke were attached to serve as executive producers on the series alongside Laura Terry. It was also announced that Jackson would write the series. On March 19, 2021, it was announced that Erica Watson was attached to direct the pilot episode of the series. On June 15, 2021, it was announced that the series was scheduled to premiere on October 25, 2021. In November 2021, it was reported that Scott Peters, the original series co-creator, would direct the twelfth episode. On May 12, 2022, the CW canceled the series after one season.

=== Casting ===
On March 30, 2021, Joseph David-Jones and Khailah Johnson were cast in main roles. On April 7, 2021, Brittany Adebumola, Jaye Ladymore, and Amarr Wooten joined the main cast. On May 24, 2021, TL Thompson, Cory Jeacoma, Ireon Roach, Derrick A. King, and Autumn Best were added to the main cast. On October 14, 2021, Kausar Mohammed, Wilder Yari, and Theo Germaine joined the cast in recurring roles. On November 22, 2021, Patrick John Flueger, who starred in the original series, was cast to guest star in the twelfth episode.

=== Filming ===
Filming on the first episode began on June 7, 2021, and was expected to last until June 24. The rest of the series was scheduled to be filmed from July 26 to December 7. Principal photography for the series took place in Chicago.

== Reception ==
=== Critical response ===
The review aggregator website Rotten Tomatoes reported an 82% approval rating with an average rating of 6.5/10, based on 11 critic reviews. Metacritic, which uses a weighted average, assigned a score of 65 out of 100 based on five critics, indicating "generally favorable reviews".

=== Ratings ===
Viewership and ratings per episode of 4400
No.	Title	Air date	Rating (18–49)	Viewers (millions)	DVR (18–49)	DVR viewers (millions)	Total (18–49)	Total viewers (millions)
1	"Past is Prologue"	October 25, 2021	0.1	0.54	—N/a	—N/a	—N/a	—N/a
2	"All Things Are Possible"	November 1, 2021	0.1	0.36	—N/a	—N/a	—N/a	—N/a
3	"That LaDonna Life"	November 8, 2021	0.1	0.35	—N/a	—N/a	—N/a	—N/a
4	"Harlem's Renaissance Man"	November 15, 2021	0.1	0.44	0.1	0.45	0.2	0.89
5	"The Way We Were"	November 22, 2021	0.1	0.35	0.1	0.38	0.1	0.73
6	"If You Love Something"	November 29, 2021	0.1	0.34	—N/a	—N/a	—N/a	—N/a
7	"Empowered Women Empower Women"	December 6, 2021	0.1	0.34	0.1	0.35	0.2	0.69
8	"The Kaminski Experiment"	December 13, 2021	0.1	0.40	—N/a	—N/a	—N/a	—N/a
9	"Great Expectations"	January 17, 2022	0.1	0.45	—N/a	—N/a	—N/a	—N/a
10	"Give Up the Ghost"	January 24, 2022	0.0	0.36	—N/a	—N/a	—N/a	—N/a
11	"You Only Meant Well"	January 31, 2022	0.1	0.31	—N/a	—N/a	—N/a	—N/a
12	"Group Efforts"	February 7, 2022	0.1	0.34	—N/a	—N/a	—N/a	—N/a
13	"Present is Prologue"	February 14, 2022	0.0	0.23	—N/a	—N/a	—N/a	—N/a

=== Cancellation ===
On May 12, 2022, the CW canceled the series after one season. The cancellation was part of an unprecedented wave of cancellations by the network. On May 12 alone, the CW cancelled seven series: 4400, Charmed, Dynasty, In the Dark, Legacies, Naomi, and Roswell, New Mexico. Two weeks earlier, the network had also cancelled Batwoman and Legends of Tomorrow. Later that summer, the network also cancelled Tom Swift after just one season.

The cancellations had a significant impact on representation at the CW, as multiple cancelled series featured Black leads or predominantly Black casts, including 4400, Naomi, Batwoman, Charmed, and Tom Swift. Tom Swift notably featured the first gay Black male lead in network television history. The mass cancellations, described by some online as "the Red Wedding" in reference to Game of Thrones, represented approximately half of the CW's lineup and occurred ahead of Nexstar's purchase of the network. Of the cancelled shows, only 4400, Naomi and Tom Swift ended after a single season.

=== Accolades ===
4400 was nominated in the Outstanding New TV Series category for the 33rd GLAAD Media Awards in 2022.
