= Ashleigh Murray =

American actress and singer (born 1988)

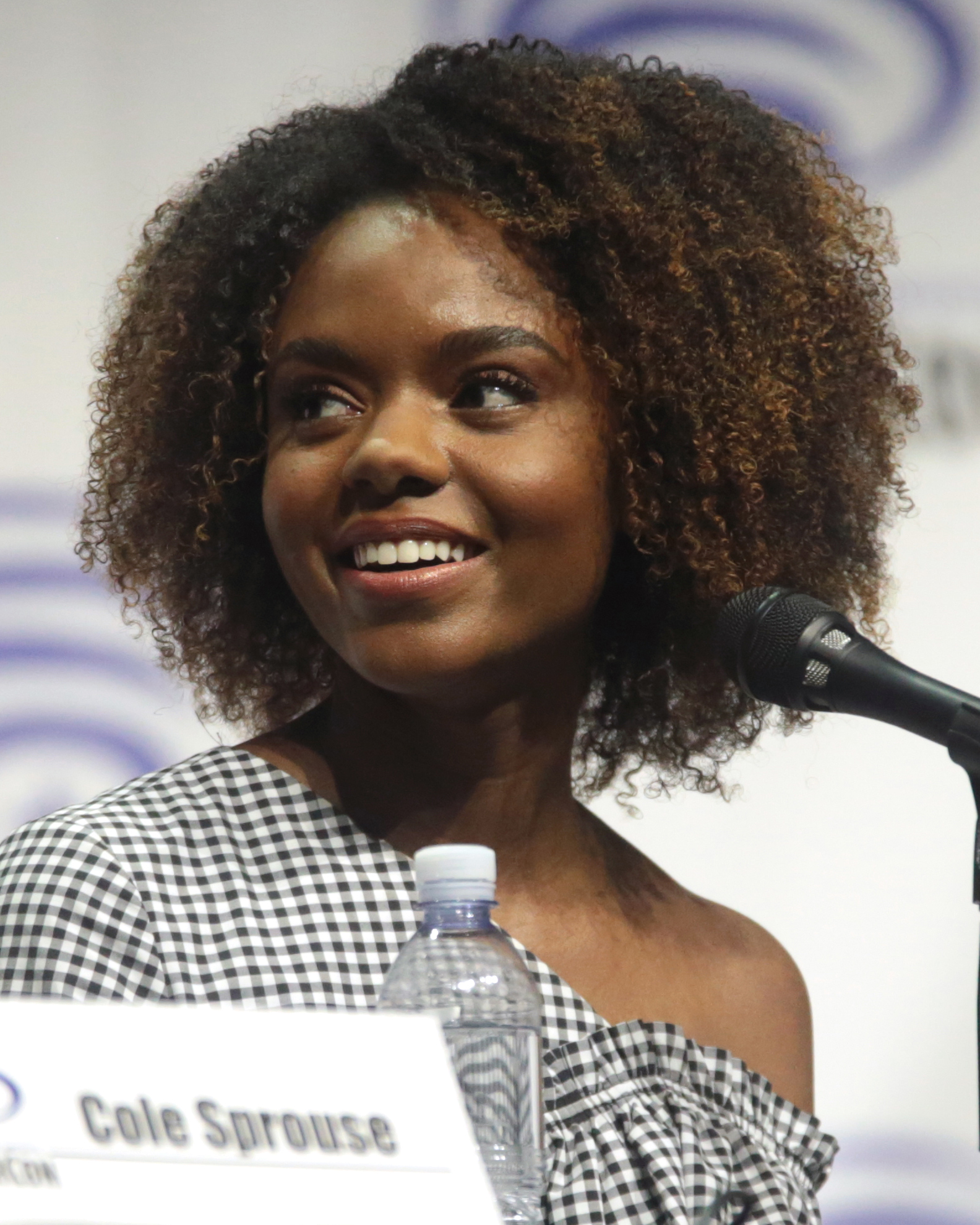
- Murray at the 2017 WonderCon
- Born: January 18, 1988 (age 38); Kansas City, Missouri, U.S.
- Occupations: Actress; singer
- Years active: 2007–present

Ashleigh Murray (born January 18, 1988) is an American actress and singer. She is best known for her breakthrough role as Josie McCoy, the lead singer of the fictional band Josie and the Pussycats, on The CW television series Riverdale, in which she appeared from 2017 to 2019. Murray reprised the role in the spin‑off series Katy Keene (2020) and later returned to Riverdale as a guest star in 2021 and 2023. Her film credits include Deidra & Laney Rob a Train (2017) and Valley Girl (2020), and she has also starred in the television series Tom Swift (2022) and The Other Black Girl (2023).

== Early life and education ==
Murray was born on January 18, 1988, in Kansas City, Missouri. She developed an interest in acting at age ten after appearing in a school play. Following high school, she moved to New York City to study at the New York Conservatory for Dramatic Arts, graduating in 2009.

== Career ==
In 2016, Murray was cast as a series regular in The CW teen drama Riverdale, portraying Josie McCoy, described as "a gorgeous, snooty and ambitious girl who is the lead singer for the popular band Josie and the Pussycats". The show premiered in 2017, and Murray remained a cast member until 2019. Her own singing voice is used in all of her performance scenes as Josie and the Pussycats, although she has stated that she is not interested in pursuing a professional singing career. In February 2019, it was announced that Murray would reprise her role as Josie McCoy as part of the main cast of the Riverdale spin‑off pilot Katy Keene. In May 2019, The CW ordered Katy Keene to series. Katy Keene was canceled after one season in July 2020 and Murray returned to Riverdale as a guest star in 2021 and 2023.

Murray had a co‑leading role in the 2017 Netflix original film Deidra & Laney Rob a Train. It premiered at the Sundance Film Festival on January 23, 2017, and was released on March 17, 2017. In April 2017, it was announced that Murray had joined the cast of MGM's musical Valley Girl, a remake of the 1983 film, in the role of Loryn.

In May 2022, Murray starred in the Nancy Drew spin-off series Tom Swift. Later that year, she was cast as Hazel‑May McCall in the Hulu mystery thriller series The Other Black Girl, a television adaptation of the 2021 novel by Zakiya Dalila Harris.

== Filmography ==
=== Film ===
Year	Title	Role	Notes
2007	Finding Harmony	Harmony	Short film
2012	Welcome to New York	Simone	
2014	Grind	Workout Girl	
2017	Deidra & Laney Rob a Train	Deidra	
2020	Valley Girl	Loryn	
2021	Christmas in Harmony	Harmony Matthews	Television film
2022	The Way Out	Gracie	
2026	Serena	Holly Charita	Filming

=== Television ===
Year	Title	Role	Notes
2014	The Following	Female College Student	Episode: "Resurrection"
2016	Younger	Girl	2 episodes
2017–19, 2021, 2023	Riverdale	Josie McCoy / Teen Sierra McCoy	Main cast (seasons 1–4) and special guest star (season 5, 7); 41 episodes
2018	Alex, Inc.	Melissa	Episode: "The Unfair Advantage"
2020	Katy Keene	Josie McCoy	Main cast
2021	Rugrats	Eve / Balloon #2 (voice)	2 episodes
2022	Tom Swift	Zenzi Fullington	Main cast
2023	The Other Black Girl	Hazel-May McCall	Main cast
