= The Other Black Girl =

2021 book by Zakiya Dalila Harris

- Author: Zakiya Dalila Harris
- Language: English
- Genre: Thriller
- Publisher: Atria (US); Bloomsbury (UK)
- Publication date: June 2021
- Publication place: United States
- ISBN: 978-1-982160-13-5

The Other Black Girl is a 2021 novel by Zakiya Dalila Harris. The debut novel follows a woman who is the only Black person working at a publishing company. The book was sold at auction to Atria Publishing Group for more than $1 million. A television series of the same title based on the novel premiered on Hulu on September 13, 2023.

== Premise ==
Nella Rogers is an editorial assistant and the only Black employee at Wagner Books, a publishing house in New York City. When Hazel-May McCall, another Black woman, is hired as an editorial assistant, Nella initially believes she will be an ally. While Hazel seems supportive in their personal interactions, Nella soon finds herself sidelined and her relationships at Wagner strained due to Hazel's advice and interference. Nella receives anonymous notes ordering her to leave Wagner. Nella begins to suspect that Hazel is not what she seems, and searches for answers about both Hazel's and Wagner Books's dark pasts.

== Background ==
Harris cites Passing by Nella Larsen, Octavia E. Butler’s Kindred, Toni Morrison’s Sula, and Americanah by Chimamanda Ngozi Adichie as key influences on the novel. Harris has also cited Jordan Peele's movie Get Out and Ira Levin's The Stepford Wives as inspiration for the novel, which contains elements of horror and satire.

== Reception ==
The Other Black Girl was released on June 1, 2021, and received positive critical reception from outlets including the Washington Post and Kirkus Reviews. The Guardian described it as "a glimpse into the publishing world and its original take on black professional women striving to hold on to their authentic selves and their stresses."

== Television adaptation ==
A television series based on the novel premiered on Hulu on September 13, 2023. The series stars Sinclair Daniel, Ashleigh Murray, Brittany Adebumola, Hunter Parrish, Bellamy Young, Eric McCormack, and Garcelle Beauvais.
