= Brittany Adebumola =

American actress (born 1996)

- Born: November 4, 1996 (age 29)
- Education: Syracuse University
- Occupation: Actress
- Years active: 2016–present

Brittany Adebumola (born November 4, 1996) is an American actress. On television, she is known for her roles in the Netflix series Grand Army (2020), the CW reboot of 4400 (2021), and the Hulu series The Other Black Girl (2023). She voiced Nakia in the third season of the Marvel Cinematic Universe animated series What If...? (2024). and the latest series M.I.A._(TV_series)

== Early life ==
Adebumola is of Nigerian and Jamaican descent. She grew up in Florida and moved to Brooklyn at the age of 14 where she attended Clara Barton High School. She took acting classes with Opening Act and the Art Effect, and graduated with a Bachelor of Fine Arts from the College of Visual and Performing Arts at Syracuse University.

== Career ==
Adebumola made her television debut in the 2020 Netflix teen drama series Grand Army as Tamika Jones. The following year, she starred as Shanice Murray in the CW reboot of the science fiction series 4400. She also made guest appearances in episodes of the Paramount+ series Guilty Party and the CBS series The Equalizer.

In 2023, Adebumola had a main role as Malaika in the Hulu adaptation of The Other Black Girl by Zakiya Dalila Harris and made her Broadway stage debut in Jaja's African Hair Braiding at the Samuel J. Friedman Theatre. She has an upcoming role in the series Demascus, which screened at the SXSW.

== Filmography ==
Year	Title	Role	Notes
2020	Grand Army	Tamika Jones	10 episodes
2021–2022	4400	Shanice Murray	Main role
2021	Guilty Party	Chevonne	Episode: "A Denver Ten"
2022	The Equalizer	Tasha "Storm" Murray	Episode: "One Percenters"
2023	The Other Black Girl	Malaika	Main role
2024	What If...?	Nakia (voice)	Episode: "What If... the Hulk Fought the Mech Avengers?"
2025	Watson	Taryn Quintyre	Episode: "The Man with the Glowing Chest"
2026	M.I.A.	Lovely	All episode
TBA	Demascus	Shaena	
