= Zakiya Dalila Harris =

American novelist

- Born: October 20, 1992 (age 33); Hamden, Connecticut, U.S.
- Education: University of North Carolina at Chapel Hill; The New School
- Occupation: Author
- Notable work: The Other Black Girl (2021)
- Relatives: Aisha Harris (sister)
- Website: zakiyadalilaharris.com

Zakiya Dalila Harris (born October 20, 1992) is an American author. She is best known for her bestselling debut novel The Other Black Girl, which was adapted into a television series for Hulu.

== Early life and education ==
Harris was born and raised in Hamden, Connecticut. Her father, Frank Harris III, is a professor at Southern Connecticut State University and former journalist for the Hartford Courant. Her sister is writer and NPR podcaster Aisha Harris.

Harris received her bachelor's degree from the University of North Carolina at Chapel Hill and her MFA in nonfiction creative writing from The New School.

== Career ==
Harris spent nearly three years at Knopf Doubleday, an imprint of Penguin Random House, first as an editorial assistant then as assistant editor, before leaving to write her debut novel The Other Black Girl. Her experiences working as an editor inspired the novel. Her essays and book reviews have appeared in Cosmopolitan, Esquire, Guernica, and The Rumpus.

The New York Times reported that Simon & Schuster's Atria imprint won the rights to The Other Black Girl in a deal valued at more than $1 million after a bidding war between 14 publishers. The Other Black Girl was released on June 1, 2021, and received positive critical reception from outlets such as te Washington Post and Kirkus Reviews. The Guardian described it as "a glimpse into the publishing world and its original take on black professional women striving to hold on to their authentic selves and their stresses."

A television adaptation of the novel for Hulu was put into development in 2020 and later ordered to series in August 2022. The series is produced by Onyx Collective and Temple Hill Entertainment. Harris and Rashida Jones, who both serve as executive producers on the series, co-wrote the pilot episode together. The series stars Sinclair Daniel, Ashleigh Murray, Brittany Adebumola, Hunter Parrish, Bellamy Young, Eric McCormack, and Garcelle Beauvais. The 10-episode first season of the series premiered on September 13, 2023.

== Personal life ==
Harris resides in Brooklyn, New York.
