= List of Weeds episodes =

The cast of the sixth season of Weeds. Left to right: Alexander Gould, Hunter Parrish, Mary-Louise Parker, Kevin Nealon and Justin Kirk.

The American dark comedy-drama series Weeds was created by Jenji Kohan and aired on premium cable channel Showtime. Mary-Louise Parker stars as Nancy Botwin, a suburban widow who begins selling marijuana to support her family. Elizabeth Perkins also starred as Nancy's neighbor, Celia Hodes, a manic PTA mother, but Perkins departed the series at the end of the fifth season. The show follows a serialized format and details Nancy's progressively deeper involvement in illegal activity as she takes care of her family.

The ten-episode first season premiered on August 8, 2005, and concluded on October 10, 2005. Season two, which comprises 12 episodes, began airing on August 14, 2006, and finished its run on October 30, 2006. The series's third season received an order of 15 episodes, premiered on August 13, 2007, and ran until November 19, 2007. The 13-episode fourth season premiered early the following summer on June 16, 2008, and concluded on September 15, 2008. Seasons one, two and three have been released on DVD and Blu-ray Disc formats in Regions 1, 2 and 4. At the 2008 Television Critics Association, it was announced that Weeds had been picked up for fifth and sixth seasons of 13 episodes each. An eighth and final season premiered on July 1, 2012, and concluded on September 16, 2012.

At the completion of the sixth season, Jenji Kohan remarked that, "In my mind, it is [the last season]. Everyone's contract is up next year, [including] the actors and mine. Seven years is a good run, and I'd rather leave while on top." However, halfway through the seventh-season run, Showtime Entertainment president David Nevins remarked that he is "optimistic" that the show will be renewed. Kohan also expressed hope that the show would be renewed. Regardless of renewal, the seventh-season finale was crafted to "stand up on its own as a series finale if it has to or be a prelude to an eighth season." An eighth season was announced in November 2011, almost two months after the seventh-season finale. On June 13, 2012, it was announced that season eight would be the final season.

Weeds steadily gained live viewers from season to season. The first season premiered to 540,000 viewers and averaged 380,000 viewers to become Showtime's highest-rated original series in 2005. Season two averaged 160,000 more viewers than season one after 570,000 viewers tuned in to the premiere; the finale received 626,000 viewers. The third season's debut was watched live by 824,000 viewers and the finale by 737,000 such that viewership was up 19% from the second season. Season four premiered to 1.3 million live viewers to become what was at the time "Showtime's most-watched single original telecast in at least four years." The first airing of the finale was watched by one million viewers and multiple airings of episodes throughout the week after their initial broadcasts averaged 2.72 million viewers—16% more than the third.

A total of 102 episodes of Weeds were broadcast over eight seasons, with the series finale airing on September 16, 2012.

== Series overview ==
| Season | Episodes | Originally released | |
| Season | Episodes | First released | Last released |
|---|---|---|---|
| 1 | 10 | August 8, 2005 | October 10, 2005 |
| 2 | 12 | August 14, 2006 | October 30, 2006 |
| 3 | 15 | August 13, 2007 | November 19, 2007 |
| 4 | 13 | June 16, 2008 | September 15, 2008 |
| 5 | 13 | June 8, 2009 | August 31, 2009 |
| 6 | 13 | August 16, 2010 | November 15, 2010 |
| 7 | 13 | June 27, 2011 | September 26, 2011 |
| 8 | 13 | July 1, 2012 | September 16, 2012 |

== Episodes ==
=== Season 1 (2005) ===
| No. overall | No. in season | Title | Directed by | Written by | Original release date |
|---|---|---|---|---|---|
| 1 | 1 | "You Can't Miss the Bear" | Brian Dannelly | Jenji Kohan | August 8, 2005 |
| 2 | 2 | "Free Goat" | Brian Dannelly | Jenji Kohan | August 15, 2005 |
| 3 | 3 | "Good Shit Lollipop" | Craig Zisk | Roberto Benabib | August 22, 2005 |
| 4 | 4 | "Fashion of the Christ" | Burr Steers | Jenji Kohan | August 29, 2005 |
| 5 | 5 | "Lude Awakening" | Lee Rose | Devon K. Shepard | September 5, 2005 |
| 6 | 6 | "Dead in the Nethers" | Arlene Sanford | Michael Platt & Barry Safchik | September 12, 2005 |
| 7 | 7 | "Higher Education" | Tucker Gates | Shawn Schepps | September 19, 2005 |
| 8 | 8 | "The Punishment Light" | Robert Berlinger | Rolin Jones | September 26, 2005 |
| 9 | 9 | "The Punishment Lighter" | Paul Feig | Matthew Salsberg | October 3, 2005 |
| 10 | 10 | "The Godmother" | Lev L. Spiro | Jenji Kohan | October 10, 2005 |

=== Season 2 (2006) ===
| No. overall | No. in season | Title | Directed by | Written by | Theme song performer(s) | Original release date |
|---|---|---|---|---|---|---|
| 11 | 1 | "Corn Snake" | Craig Zisk | Jenji Kohan | Elvis Costello | August 14, 2006 |
| 12 | 2 | "Cooking with Jesus" | Craig Zisk | Jenji Kohan | Death Cab for Cutie | August 21, 2006 |
| 13 | 3 | "Last Tango in Agrestic" | Bryan Gordon | Roberto Benabib | Engelbert Humperdinck | August 28, 2006 |
| 14 | 4 | "A.K.A. The Plant" | Lev L. Spiro | Matthew Salsberg | Kate & Anna McGarrigle | September 4, 2006 |
| 15 | 5 | "Mrs. Botwin's Neighborhood" | Craig Zisk | Rolin Jones | Charles Barnett | September 11, 2006 |
| 16 | 6 | "Crush Girl Love Panic" | Tucker Gates | Devon K. Shepard | Aidan Hawken | September 18, 2006 |
| 17 | 7 | "Must Find Toes" | Chris Long | Michael Platt & Barry Safchik | Ozomatli | September 25, 2006 |
| 18 | 8 | "MILF Money" | Craig Zisk | Shawn Schepps | The Submarines | October 2, 2006 |
| 19 | 9 | "Bash" | Christopher Misiano | Rinne Groff | Tim DeLaughter | October 9, 2006 |
| 20 | 10 | "Mile Deep and a Foot Wide" | Craig Zisk | Rolin Jones | Regina Spektor | October 16, 2006 |
| 21 | 11 | "Yeah. Like Tomatoes" (Note: The title of the episode on Netflix is "Yeah, Just Like Tomatoes"., while on TV Guide it is "Yeah, Like Tomatoes".) "Yeah. Just Like Tomatoes" | Craig Zisk | Roberto Benabib & Matthew Salsberg | Jenny Lewis & Johnathan Rice | October 23, 2006 |
| 22 | 12 | "Pittsburgh" | Craig Zisk | Jenji Kohan | Malvina Reynolds | October 30, 2006 |

=== Season 3 (2007) ===
| No. overall | No. in season | Title | Directed by | Written by | Theme song performer(s) | Original release date | US viewers (millions) |
|---|---|---|---|---|---|---|---|
| 23 | 1 | "Doing the Backstroke" | Craig Zisk | Jenji Kohan | Randy Newman | August 13, 2007 | 0.82 |
| 24 | 2 | "A Pool and His Money" | Craig Zisk | Jenji Kohan | Angelique Kidjo | August 20, 2007 | 0.74 |
| 25 | 3 | "The Brick Dance" | Lev L. Spiro | Roberto Benabib | Kinky | August 27, 2007 | N/A |
| 26 | 4 | "Shit Highway" | Martha Coolidge | Roberto Benabib | Donovan | September 3, 2007 | 0.74 |
| 27 | 5 | "Bill Sussman" | Craig Zisk | Rolin Jones | Billy Bob Thornton | September 10, 2007 | N/A |
| 28 | 6 | "Grasshopper" | Perry Lang | Devon K. Shepard | The Shins | September 17, 2007 | N/A |
| 29 | 7 | "He Taught Me How To Drive By" | Paul Feig | Matthew Salsberg | The Individuals | September 24, 2007 | 0.64 |
| 30 | 8 | "The Two Mrs. Scottsons" | Craig Zisk | Rolin Jones | Man Man | October 1, 2007 | 0.58 |
| 31 | 9 | "Release the Hounds" | Ernest Dickerson | Blair Singer | Joan Baez | October 8, 2007 | 0.52 |
| 32 | 10 | "Roy Till Called" | Craig Zisk | Victoria Morrow | The Decemberists | October 15, 2007 | N/A |
| 33 | 11 | "Cankles" | Julie Anne Robinson | Christina Kiang Booth | Michael Franti | October 22, 2007 | 0.61 |
| 34 | 12 | "The Dark Time" | Ernest Dickerson | Victoria Morrow | Persephone's Bees | October 29, 2007 | 0.69 |
| 35 | 13 | "Risk" | Paul Feig | Roberto Benabib & Rolin Jones & Matthew Salsberg | Laurie Berkner | November 5, 2007 | N/A |
| 36 | 14 | "Protection" | Randy Zisk | Roberto Benabib | Linkin Park | November 12, 2007 | 0.68 |
| 37 | 15 | "Go" | Craig Zisk | Jenji Kohan | Opening: Malvina Reynolds; Closing: Pete Seeger | November 19, 2007 | 0.74 |

=== Season 4 (2008) ===
| No. overall | No. in season | Title | Directed by | Written by | Intertitle | Original release date | US viewers (millions) |
|---|---|---|---|---|---|---|---|
| 38 | 1 | "Mother Thinks the Birds Are After Her" | Craig Zisk | Jenji Kohan | Video of Majestic burning | June 16, 2008 | 1.35 |
| 39 | 2 | "Lady's a Charm" | Craig Zisk | Victoria Morrow | Mexican border checkpoint | June 23, 2008 | 1.10 |
| 40 | 3 | "The Whole Blah Damn Thing" | David Steinberg | Ron Fitzgerald | Medical monitor | June 30, 2008 | 0.86 |
| 41 | 4 | "The Three Coolers" | Paris Barclay | Roberto Benabib | Shiva candle | July 7, 2008 | 1.06 |
| 42 | 5 | "No Man is Pudding" | Craig Zisk | Rolin Jones | Pudding containers | July 14, 2008 | 1.00 |
| 43 | 6 | "Excellent Treasures" | Julie Anne Robinson | Jenji Kohan | Flip-flop impression on the sand | July 21, 2008 | 1.03 |
| 44 | 7 | "Yes I Can" | Scott Ellis | Matthew Salsberg | Package of prescription pills | July 28, 2008 | 0.77 |
| 45 | 8 | "I Am the Table" | Adam Bernstein | David Holstein & Brendan Kelly | Immigration sign | August 4, 2008 | 0.94 |
| 46 | 9 | "Little Boats" | Craig Zisk | Ron Fitzgerald | Mexican hero portraits | August 11, 2008 | 0.85 |
| 47 | 10 | "The Love Circle Overlap" | Julie Anne Robinson | Victoria Morrow | Condom in wrapper | August 18, 2008 | 0.88 |
| 48 | 11 | "Head Cheese" | Craig Zisk | Roberto Benabib & Rolin Jones & Matthew Salsberg | Neck and chest tattoos | August 25, 2008 | 0.82 |
| 49 | 12 | "Till We Meet Again" | Michael Trim | Roberto Benabib & Rolin Jones & Matthew Salsberg | Electric power-sander | September 8, 2008 | 0.93 |
| 50 | 13 | "If You Work for a Living, Then Why Do You Kill Yourself Working?" | Craig Zisk | Jenji Kohan | Gift basket | September 15, 2008 | 1.01 |

=== Season 5 (2009) ===
| No. overall | No. in season | Title | Directed by | Written by | Intertitle | Original release date |
|---|---|---|---|---|---|---|
| 51 | 1 | "Wonderful Wonderful" | Scott Ellis | Jenji Kohan | Gynecological exam | June 8, 2009 |
| 52 | 2 | "Machetes Up Top" | Michael Pressman | Victoria Morrow | Sushi meal | June 15, 2009 |
| 53 | 3 | "Su-Su-Sucio" | Lesli Linka Glatter | Roberto Benabib & Matthew Salsberg | Soap bar | June 22, 2009 |
| 54 | 4 | "Super Lucky Happy" | Scott Ellis | Ron Fitzgerald | Pinball machine | June 29, 2009 |
| 55 | 5 | "Van Nuys" | Bethany Rooney | Stephen Falk | Cockatoo | July 6, 2009 |
| 56 | 6 | "A Modest Proposal" | Michael Trim | Vanessa Reisen | Swimsuit with fake tan | July 13, 2009 |
| 57 | 7 | "Where the Sidewalk Ends" | Jeremy Podeswa | Roberto Benabib & Matthew Salsberg | Weeds entry on Wikipedia | July 20, 2009 |
| 58 | 8 | "A Distinctive Horn" | Scott Ellis | Chris Offutt | Medical file drawer | July 27, 2009 |
| 59 | 9 | "Suck 'n' Spit" | Michael Trim | Brendan Kelly | Lactating woman | August 3, 2009 |
| 60 | 10 | "Perro Insano" | Scott Ellis | David Holstein | Wrestling masks | August 10, 2009 |
| 61 | 11 | "Ducks and Tigers" | Matt Shakman | Stephen Falk | Anatomical drawing of the vulva | August 17, 2009 |
| 62 | 12 | "Glue" | Michael Pressman | Ron Fitzgerald | Four objects (keys, coins, Ren Mar police badge and a gum) | August 24, 2009 |
| 63 | 13 | "All About My Mom" | Scott Ellis | Jenji Kohan | Woman jumping into pool | August 31, 2009 |

=== Season 6 (2010) ===
| No. overall | No. in season | Title | Directed by | Written by | Intertitle | Original release date | US viewers (millions) |
|---|---|---|---|---|---|---|---|
| 64 | 1 | "Thwack" | Scott Ellis | Jenji Kohan | Frozen concentrated orange juice with money inside | August 16, 2010 | 1.26 |
| 65 | 2 | "Felling and Swamping" | Scott Ellis | Victoria Morrow | Convenience store snacks | August 23, 2010 | 1.04 |
| 66 | 3 | "A Yippity Sippity" | Tate Donovan | Brendan Kelly | Hotel card-key | August 30, 2010 | 1.02 |
| 67 | 4 | "Bliss" | Eric Jewett | Stephen Falk | Body charms | September 13, 2010 | 0.96 |
| 68 | 5 | "Boomerang" | Scott Ellis | Stephen Falk | Initials carved in tree | September 20, 2010 | 0.83 |
| 69 | 6 | "A Shoe for a Shoe" | Michael Trim | David Holstein | Restaurant place mats | September 27, 2010 | 0.99 |
| 70 | 7 | "Pinwheels and Whirligigs" | Mike Uppendahl | Carly Mensch | Blocks of butter at the fair | October 4, 2010 | 0.68 |
| 71 | 8 | "Gentle Puppies" | Scott Ellis | Victoria Morrow | Pioneer City welcome sign | October 11, 2010 | 0.93 |
| 72 | 9 | "To Moscow, and Quickly" | Michael Trim | David Holstein & Carly Mensch | Child's crayon drawing on the notebook | October 18, 2010 | 0.85 |
| 73 | 10 | "Dearborn-Again" | Scott Ellis | Roberto Benabib & Matthew Salsberg | Sky Mall catalogue | October 25, 2010 | 0.80 |
| 74 | 11 | "Viking Pride" | Michael Trim | Brendan Kelly & Tara Herrmann | Passport stamp | November 1, 2010 | 0.99 |
| 75 | 12 | "Fran Tarkenton" | David Warren | Stephen Falk | Cadaver toe-tag | November 8, 2010 | 0.86 |
| 76 | 13 | "Theoretical Love Is Not Dead" | Scott Ellis | Jenji Kohan | Gate at airport | November 15, 2010 | 0.99 |

=== Season 7 (2011) ===
| No. overall | No. in season | Title | Directed by | Written by | Intertitle | Original release date | US viewers (millions) |
|---|---|---|---|---|---|---|---|
| 77 | 1 | "Bags" | Scott Ellis | Jenji Kohan | Steam from sauna coals | June 27, 2011 | 1.19 |
| 78 | 2 | "From Trauma Cometh Something" | Michael Trim | Carly Mensch | Subway passenger's jacket and seat graffiti | July 4, 2011 | 0.62 |
| 79 | 3 | "Game-Played" | Scott Ellis | Victoria Morrow | Animal marionette theatre | July 11, 2011 | 0.78 |
| 80 | 4 | "A Hole in Her Niqab" | Eric Jewett | David Holstein | Photocopier print-outs | July 18, 2011 | 0.67 |
| 81 | 5 | "Fingers Only Meat Banquet" | Scott Ellis | Brendan Kelly | Beefsteak slices | July 25, 2011 | 0.68 |
| 82 | 6 | "Object Impermanence" | Michael Trim | Stephen Falk | Planetarium show | August 1, 2011 | 0.71 |
| 83 | 7 | "Vehement v. Vigorous" | Scott Ellis | Carly Mensch | Boxing match | August 8, 2011 | 0.69 |
| 84 | 8 | "Synthetics" | Michael Trim | Victoria Morrow | Figurines on display shelf | August 15, 2011 | 0.67 |
| 85 | 9 | "Cats! Cats! Cats!" | Michael Trim | David Holstein | Title cards at vaudeville show | August 22, 2011 | 0.72 |
| 86 | 10 | "System Overhead" | Scott Ellis | Brendan Kelly | Doug holding cue cards | August 29, 2011 | 0.80 |
| 87 | 11 | "Une Mère que j'aimerais baiser" | Eric Jewett | Roberto Benabib & Matthew Salsberg | Pouring soda can | September 12, 2011 | 0.75 |
| 88 | 12 | "Qualitative Spatial Reasoning" | Scott Ellis | Stephen Falk | Display on broken laptop screen | September 19, 2011 | 0.52 |
| 89 | 13 | "Do Her/Don't Do Her" | Michael Trim | Jenji Kohan | Graffiti on a coffin | September 26, 2011 | 0.56 |

=== Season 8 (2012) ===
| No. overall | No. in season | Title | Directed by | Written by | Theme song performer(s) | Original release date | US viewers (millions) |
|---|---|---|---|---|---|---|---|
| 90 | 1 | "Messy" | Michael Trim | Jenji Kohan | Malvina Reynolds | July 1, 2012 | 0.81 |
| 91 | 2 | "A Beam of Sunshine" | Michael Trim | Victoria Morrow | Ben Folds | July 8, 2012 | 0.61 |
| 92 | 3 | "See Blue and Smell Cheese and Die" | Julie Anne Robinson | David Holstein | Steve Martin & Kevin Nealon | July 15, 2012 | 0.78 |
| 93 | 4 | "Only Judy Can Judge" | Michael Trim | Carly Mensch | Mariachi El Bronx | July 22, 2012 | 0.57 |
| 94 | 5 | "Red in Tooth and Claw" | Michael Trim | Stephen Falk | The Mountain Goats | July 29, 2012 | 0.48 |
| 95 | 6 | "Allosaurus Crush Castle" | Julie Anne Robinson | Brendan Kelly | Bomb the Music Industry! | August 5, 2012 | 0.64 |
| 96 | 7 | "Unfreeze" | Perry Lang | Victoria Morrow | The Womenfolk | August 12, 2012 | 0.56 |
| 97 | 8 | "Five Miles From Yetzer Hara" | Phil Abraham | David Holstein | The Thermals | August 19, 2012 | 0.77 |
| 98 | 9 | "Saplings" | Michael Trim | Carly Mensch | Dierks Bentley | August 26, 2012 | 0.68 |
| 99 | 10 | "Threshold" | Eric Jewett | Brendan Kelly | Hunter Parrish | September 2, 2012 | 0.61 |
| 100 | 11 | "God Willing and the Creek Don't Rise" | Uta Briesewitz | Stephen Falk | Aimee Mann | September 9, 2012 | 0.69 |
| 101 | 12 | "It's Time" | Michael Trim | Jenji Kohan | Malvina Reynolds | September 16, 2012 | 0.86 |
| 102 | 13 | "It's Time" | Michael Trim | Jenji Kohan | Malvina Reynolds | September 16, 2012 | 0.86 |
