= Jamie Renée Smith =

American actress (born 1987)

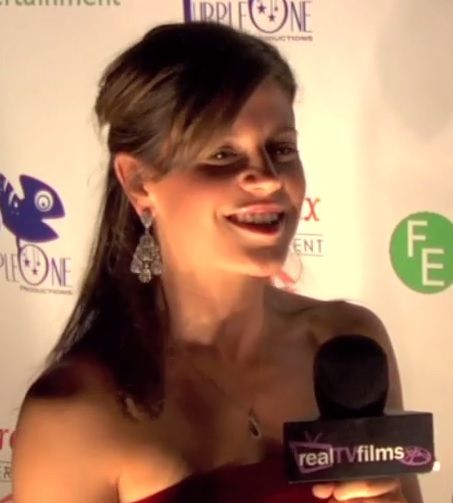
- Jamie Renée Smith in 2014
- Born: April 10, 1987 (age 39); Manhattan, New York, U.S.
- Other name: Jamie Renee Smith
- Occupation: Actress
- Years active: 1993–present
- Known for: Dante's Peak (1997)

Jamie Renée Smith (born April 10, 1987) is an American actress best known for her respective roles as Tara Westover, Margaret Rhodes and Lauren Wando in the films MVP: Most Valuable Primate, Up, Up and Away, Children of the Corn IV: The Gathering (1996) and Dante's Peak (1997).

== Life and career ==
Smith began her acting career in the fall of 1993 at the age of six when, at her first audition, she landed a guest-starring role on an episode of Saved by the Bell: The College Years ("Teacher's Pet") as Abby Lasky. In addition to her roles in Children of the Corn IV: The Gathering and Dante's Peak, Smith has appeared in various other television and films including Midnight Man, the ABC TV movie My Last Love (1999), the film MVP: Most Valuable Primate (2000), the Disney Channel Original Movie Up, Up and Away, ER, Grounded for Life, Malcolm in the Middle, Shark, Bones, Criminal Minds: Suspect Behavior and NCIS. She also had three-episode stints on The Nanny and Weeds. In 1998, at the age of 10, Smith was a series regular on the Fox sitcom Ask Harriet as Blair Code; the series was canceled after five episodes aired.

== Partial filmography ==
Film
Year	Film	Role	Notes
1995	Midnight Man	Molly Kang	Alternative tile: Blood for Blood
1996	Magic in the Mirror	Mary Margaret	
1996	Magic in the Mirror: Fowl Play	Mary Margaret	
1996	Ringer	Natasha	
1996	Children of the Corn IV: The Gathering	Margaret Rhodes	Direct-to-video release
1997	Dante's Peak	Lauren Wando	
1998	The New Swiss Family Robinson	Elizabeth Robinson	
2000	MVP: Most Valuable Primate	Tara Westover	
2007	The Secret Life of Tom Bishop	Tom's Girlfriend	
Television
Year	Title	Role	Notes
1993	Saved by the Bell: The College Years	Abby Lasky	Episode: "Teacher's Pet"
1994	Blood Run	Alicia	Television film
1994	Someone She Knows	Brandy Gardner	Television film
1994	Roseanne: An Unauthorized Biography	Jennifer (Age 3)	Television film
1997	Dark Skies	Monica Gresham	Episodes: "Shades of Gray" "Burn, Baby, Burn"
1997	VR.5	Rebecca	Episode: "Send Me an Angel"
1997	Toothless	Young Katherine	Television film
1997–1998	The Nanny	Young Fran Fine	Episodes: "Fran's Roots" "The Wedding" "The Hanukkah Story"
1998	Rhapsody in Bloom	Ellen Bloom	Television film
1998	Ask Harriet	Blair Code	Series regular
1999	My Last Love	Carson Morton	Television film
1999	Cupid		Episode: "The Children's Hour"
1999	Any Day Now		1 episode
2000	Up, Up, and Away	Amy Rosen	Television film
2001	ER	Emily Perrault	Episode: "Survival of the Fittest"
2003	Grounded for Life	Lorna	Episode: "Baby Come Back"
2004	Malcolm in the Middle	Paula	Episode: "Malcolm Visits College"
2008	Shark	Abby Coleman	Episode: "One Hit Wonder"
2008	Bones	Karen	Episode: "The Perfect Pieces in the Purple Pond"
2009	NCIS	Rhiannon	Episode: "Caged"
2010	Weeds	Kimmie	Episodes: "Bliss" "Boomerang" "A Shoe for a Shoe"
2011	Criminal Minds: Suspect Behavior	Cindy	Episode: "Jane"
2012	A Taste of Romance	Beth	Television film
2020	Hidden Canyons	Violet Thornton	Unknown episodes

== Awards and nominations ==
Year	Award	Result	Category	Film or series
1998	Young Artist Award	Won	Best Performance in a Feature Film - Young Actress Age Ten or Under	Dante's Peak
2000	Young Artist Award	Won	Best Performance in a TV Movie or Pilot - Leading Young Actress	My Last Love
2001	Young Artist Award	Nominated	Best Performance in a Feature Film - Leading Young Actress	MVP: Most Valuable Primate
2002	Young Artist Award	Won	Best Performance in a TV Drama Series - Guest Starring Young Actress	ER
