= Kate Comer =

American actress

- Occupations: Actress, comedian
- Years active: 2007-present

Kate Comer is an American actress and comedian.

== Career ==
Comer grew up in Sarasota, Florida, where she was involved with community theatre. As a teenager, she became obsessed with movies such as Trainspotting, Donnie Darko and Pretty in Pink. She was also inspired by African-American characters like Angela Moore from Boy Meets World. She studied at the Howey Acting Studio which she credits as having "allowed and encouraged [her] to be [herself] 100%". She joined the cast of New Warriors as the character Debrii on Freeform. The show was dropped by Freeform before being cancelled. Despite this, Comer maintains a close friendship with her cast mates.

== Filmography ==
Film roles
Year	Title	Role	Notes
2007	Wainy Days	—N/a	Production assistant
2009	Michael & Michael Have Issues	Diet Cola Girl	
2011	Crying in Public	Coffee Shop Crier	Short
2015	Hello, My Name Is Doris	Hipster Girl	
2019	Wine Country	Clem	
2020	Sixteen Thousand Dollars	Commercial Host	Short
2021	King Knight	Rowena	
2024	The Uninvited	Tracy	

Television roles
Year	Title	Role	Notes
2009	Dollhouse	Attendant	Episode: "Stop-Loss"
2009-2011	The Whitest Kids U' Know	Various	4 episodes
2013	The Office	Photographer	Episode: "Paper Airplane"
2013	Criminal Minds	Casey	Episode: "Final Shot"
2014	Murder in the First	Lisa Sunday	Episode: "The City of Sisterly Love"
2014	The Comeback	Rada	3 episodes
2014-2015	The Fosters	Hipster	2 episodes
2015	Shameless	Art Teacher	Episode: "Milk of the Gods"
2015	Other Space	Crew Member #1	Episode: "Into the Great Beyond... Beyond"
2016	Veep	Secretary	Episode: "Inauguration"
2016	Roadies	Robin	Episode: "The Corporate Gig"
2017	Animal Kingdom	Eileen	Episode: "Broken Boards"
2017	Modern Family	Destiny	Episode: "It's the Great Pumpkin, Phil Dunphy"
2018	It's Always Sunny In Philadelphia	Amanda	Episode: "The Gang Escapes"
2018	Marvel's New Warriors	Deborah Fields / Debrii	TV pilot
2019	I Think You Should Leave With Tim Robinson	Miranda	Episode: "Thanks for Thinking They Are Cool"
2019	You're The Worst	Debbie / Ripped Jeans	Episode: "The One We Don't Talk About"
2019	What We Do in the Shadows	Park Woman	Episode: "Pilot"
2022	The Dropout	Miriam	Episode: "Satori"
2022	Reboot	Female Exec	Episode: "Step Right Up"
2024	Krapopolis	Queen of Atlantis (voice)	Episode: "Prince Hippo"
