= Dave Holstein =

American writer, producer, and showrunner

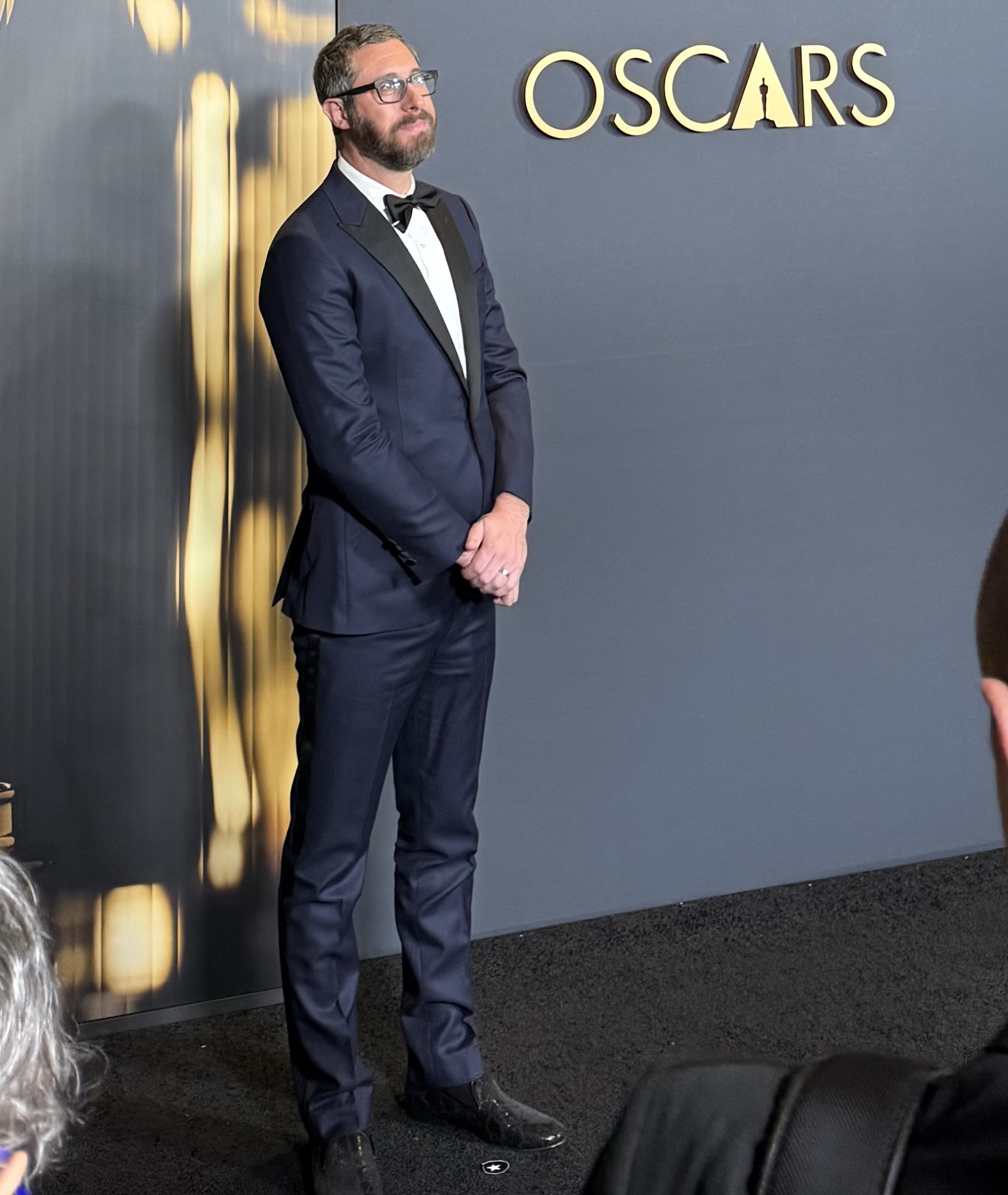
- Born: David Holstein; Houston, Texas, U.S.
- Occupations: Writer; producer; showrunner
- Years active: 2004 – present

Dave Holstein is an American writer, producer, and showrunner known for his work in television and film.

== Life and career ==
Dave Holstein, born in Houston, Texas, is a graduate of Northwestern University. He created and wrote for the Showtime series Kidding, starring Jim Carrey, which was nominated for a Golden Globe Award for Best Television Series – Musical or Comedy. He has been a writer and producer for shows like Weeds, The Brink on HBO, I'm Dying Up Here on Showtime, and the final season of Raising Hope on FOX. Additionally, he has written for Gigantic on TeenNick. His film work includes co-writing the screenplay for Pixar’s sequel Inside Out 2.

In theater, Holstein's notable work includes the musical adaptation of The Emperor's New Clothes, which was staged at the Chicago Shakespeare Theater. As a student, he attended PGT (Play Group Theatre) in White Plains, NY. He also co-wrote the interactive musical short film My Little Red/Green Coat with Alan Schmuckler, which premiered at the New York Musical Theatre Festival in 2015. Additionally, he attended the Johnny Mercer Writers Colony at Goodspeed Musicals in 2014.

In addition to his television and theater work, Holstein has ventured into podcasting with "Wait Wait Don't Kill Me," the first ever serialized podcast musical which he co-wrote with Alan Schmuckler, for which he received the 2017 Webby Award.

== Selected filmography ==
Year	Title	Writer	Producer	Creator	Notes
2008–2012	Weeds	Yes	Yes	No	Wrote 19 episodes, produced 13 episodes
2010–2011	Gigantic	Yes	No	No	Wrote 4 episodes
2013–2014	Raising Hope	Yes	Yes	No	Wrote 1 episode, produced 20 episodes
2015	The Brink	Yes	Yes	No	Wrote 3 episodes, produced 9 episodes
2017	I'm Dying Up Here	Yes	Yes	No	Wrote 1 episode, produced 9 episodes
2018–2020	Kidding	Yes	Yes	Yes	20 episodes
2020	68 Whiskey	Yes	Yes	No	Wrote 2 episodes, produced 10 episodes
2024	Inside Out 2	Yes	No	No	Feature film

== Awards and nominations ==
Year	Result	Award	Category	Work	Ref.
2009	Nominated	Writers Guild of America Awards	Comedy Series	Weeds	
2019	Nominated	Golden Globe Awards	Best Television Series – Musical or Comedy	Kidding	
2024	Won	Hamptons International Film Festival	Achievement in Screenwriting Award	Inside Out 2	
2024	Nominated	International Online Cinema Awards	Best Adapted Screenplay	Inside Out 2	
2025	Nominated	Annie Awards	Outstanding Achievement for Writing in a Feature Production	Inside Out 2	
2025	Won	Humanitas Prize	Best Family Feature	Inside Out 2	
