= Debrii =

- Cover art for The New Warriors (vol. 3) #4. Art by Scottie Young.

Publication information
- Publisher: Marvel Comics
- First appearance: The New Warriors (vol. 3) #4 (November 2005)
- Created by: Zeb Wells; Scottie Young

In-story information
- Alter ego: Deborah Fields
- Team affiliations: New Warriors; Secret Avengers (Civil War); The Initiative; Counter Force
- Abilities: Telekinesis

Debrii (Deborah Fields) is a character appearing in American comic books published by Marvel Comics. Created by writer Zeb Wells and artist Skottie Young, she debuted in The New Warriors vol. 3 #4. Debrii was not involved in the battle that killed the other New Warriors during the "Civil War" storyline and went on to join the Initiative.

== Fictional character biography ==
=== New Warriors ===
Debrii was introduced by the New Warriors' TV producer, Ashley, and so was the only member of Night Thrasher's revised team to have not been hand-picked by him. The TV company's board of directors felt that there was no "friction" in the current team — they all liked each other too much — and that the show would get better ratings if an unknown quantity was added to the team. Debrii's abrasive, antagonistic personality was perfect in this regard; she did not get on well with any of the team members, frequently making snide comments about Microbe's relatively useless powers and constantly arguing with Namorita.

=== Civil War ===
At some point, Debrii left the team, but sometime afterwards, the New Warriors recklessly fought stronger villains resulting in the deaths of most of them, their film crew, and hundreds of innocent people. After this, Hindsight, a former ally of the New Warriors, turns against them and outs their secret identities on social media. Debrii is attacked and has her car overturned and set on fire.

After Ragnarok, a clone of Thor, kills Black Goliath, Debrii is compelled to become involved and joins Captain America's Secret Avengers.

=== Initiative ===
Deborah is one of the 142 registered superheroes who are a part of the Initiative program. She is one of the former Warriors who were accused of beating Gauntlet. In truth, it was her fellow recruit Slapstick who performed the crime, as he was sick of Gauntlet insulting his dead friends.

Debrii later quits the Initiative, along with Justice, Rage, and Slapstick forming the team Counter Force. She later returns to Camp Hammond with the team, now calling themselves the New Warriors again, and battled Ragnarok.

Debrii eventually quits the team, and leaves the country to go into hiding with Heavy Hitters members Nonstop and Telemetry. After Norman Osborn's defeat, she is no longer a fugitive but remains in Paris, working as the judge of the TV talent competition Superpouvoir.

=== Fear Itself ===
In Fear Itself, Debrii appears at a meeting held by Prodigy regarding magical hammers that have crashed onto Earth. Debrii and other heroes battle Juggernaut, who was transformed into Kuurth: Breaker of Stone. She and Rage help the team in their battle against Thor Girl, who had recovered her powers.

== Powers and abilities ==
Debrii is described as a "low level telekinetic magnet". She is able to move masses of huge objects in her immediate vicinity at will, and is capable of manipulating many such objects at one time. She can use any "debris" around her to defend herself from attacks, or to attack her enemies. During the New Warriors' battle with the Mad Thinker's Intellectual Robots, she took control of a pile of scrap metal, crafting a shell in the form of a large monster around her body, and manipulating it as a weapon. However, Debrii is incapable of lifting heavy objects. She can also levitate herself slightly, but is incapable of flight.

== In other media ==
- Debrii was set to appear in the Marvel Television live-action New Warriors TV series, portrayed by Kate Comer, before it was cancelled.
- Debrii appears in Marvel Snap.
