= Jeremy Tardy =

American actor

- Born: November 7, 1990 (age 35); Milwaukee, Wisconsin, U.S.
- Education: Juilliard School (BFA)
- Occupation: actor
- Years active: 2008-present

Jeremy Tardy (born November 7, 1990) is an American actor best known for Dear White People on Netflix and 68 Whiskey on Paramount Network.

== Career ==
Jeremy Tardy started acting in theater at the age of five. All throughout his school life he struggled with his grades when he began to focus on acting, saying, "I did not indulge in most things that kids my age were into...The biggest challenge I have faced was the challenge of staying on the right track as a teenager...I have had many friends get caught up in the street life and the trouble that comes with it." Jeremy's hard work earned him acceptance into Juilliard School. In 2016, he was cast as Rashid Bakr in the Netflix television adaptation as Dear White People. He was cast as Night Thrasher in New Warriors on Freeform, but the series would remain unaired before getting cancelled. On September 12, 2020, he left Dear White People and he will not appear in its final season. Tardy claims Lionsgate did not pay him and was discriminatory towards non-white actors.

== Filmography ==
Film roles
Year	Title	Role	Notes
2008	The Waiting Room	Workman	Short
2009	Ward Three	Male Nurse	Short
2015	Bone Tomahawk	Buford	
2016	Guys Reading Poems	Theatre Fan	
2016	War Dogs	Kip	
2017	Boone: The Bounty Hunter	Pool Party Guest	
2017	Traces	Jeremy	
2019	Finding Phoebe	Joseph	Short
2020	Party with Me	Truth	
2021	Traces	Jeremy	
2021	Donny's Bar Mitzvah	Gerald	
2021	Voodoo Macbeth	Maurice	
2024	Prey	Thabo	

Television roles
Year	Title	Role	Notes
2015	The Mindy Project	Pramood	2 episodes
2015	Castle	Julian Bailey	Episode: "At Close Range"
2017-2019	Dear White People	Rashid Bakr	Recurring
2017	Ten Days in the Valley	Aubrey	Episode: "Pilot"
2018	Ballers	Andrew	6 episodes
2018	New Warriors	Dwayne Taylor/Night Thrasher	TV Pilot
2020	68 Whiskey	Staff Sergeant Mekhi Davis	Main role
2025	Girl at a Bar	Anthony	1 episode
