= Kidding =

American comedy-drama television series

- Title screen from the first episode
- Genre: Family drama Comedy drama Tragicomedy
- Created by: Dave Holstein
- Starring: Jim Carrey; Frank Langella; Judy Greer; Cole Allen; Juliet Morris; Catherine Keener; Justin Kirk
- Composer: David Wingo
- Country of origin: United States
- Original language: English
- No. of seasons: 2
- No. of episodes: 20

Production
- Executive producers: Dave Holstein; Jim Carrey; Michel Gondry; Raffi Adlan; Michael Aguilar; Roberto Benabib; Jason Bateman; James Garavente
- Producers: Halley Feiffer; Michael Vukadinovich; Nicole Montez
- Cinematography: Shawn Kim; Shasta Spahn
- Editors: Ivan Victor; Kyle Reiter; Jennifer Van Goethem; Tyler L. Cook
- Camera setup: Single-camera
- Running time: 25–32 minutes
- Production companies: I Love You Julian!; Aggregate Films; Some Kind of Garden; Showtime Networks

Original release
- Network: Showtime
- Release: September 9, 2018 – March 8, 2020

Kidding is an American family tragicomedy television series created by Dave Holstein that premiered on September 9, 2018, on Showtime. The series stars Jim Carrey, Frank Langella, Judy Greer, Cole Allen, Juliet Morris, and Catherine Keener. Michel Gondry serves as executive producer and directed several episodes. In October 2018, Showtime renewed the series for a second season which premiered February 9, 2020. In July 2020, the series was canceled after two seasons.

== Premise ==
Kidding is set in Columbus, Ohio, and follows Jeff Piccirillo, AKA beloved children's television presenter Mr. Pickles, appreciated by children and parents alike. Mr. Pickles anchors a multimillion-dollar branding empire, but he faces a personal tragedy and difficult family life.

== Cast and characters ==
=== Main ===
- Jim Carrey as Jeff Piccirillo, a television personality who has performed as "Jeff Pickles" on his longtime children's television program Mr. Pickles' Puppet Time on PBS for thirty years. Following the death of one of his sons, he finds great difficulty in adapting to the hardships of life. Zackary Arthur portrays a young Jeff in a recurring role.
- Frank Langella as Sebastian Piccirillo, the executive producer of Mr. Pickles' Puppet Time and Jeff and Didi's father
- Judy Greer as Jill Piccirillo, a nurse and Jeff's estranged ex-wife
- Cole Allen as William "Will" and Philip "Phil" Piccirillo, Jeff and Jill's identical twin sons, the latter of whom died in a car accident
- Juliet Morris as Maddy Perera, Deirdre and Scott's daughter and Jeff's niece
- Catherine Keener as Deirdre "Didi" Perera, the head puppet maker of Mr. Pickles' Puppet Time and Jeff's sister
- Justin Kirk as Peter, an anesthesiologist whom Jill is dating (recurring season 1, main season 2)

=== Recurring ===
- Bernard White as Scott Perera, Deirdre's husband
- Alex Raul Barrios as Derrell, the stagehand for Mr. Pickles' Puppet Time
- Julitta Scheel as Cassidy, one of Will's older friends from high school
- Coda Boesel as B.D., one of Will's older friends from high school
- Juliocesar Chavez as Gigs, one of Will's older friends from high school
- Ginger Gonzaga as Vivian, a woman dying of cancer whom Jeff dates until she goes into remission
- Tara Lipinski as herself, an Olympic figure skater hired to star as Mr. Pickles in the "Pickles On Ice-tacular"
- Jennie Pierson as Sara Lipinski, Tara's sister who replaces her as Mr. Pickles' ice-skating double. Jennifer Don portrays her while ice-skating in a guest appearance in the episode "Lt. Pickles".
- Joel Swetow as Michael Epstein, a Rabbi and writer hired by Seb to work on Mr. Pickles' Puppet Time in order to reduce Jeff's workload
- Louis Ozawa Changchien as Mr. Pickles-San, an actor newly hired to portray Mr. Pickles in the Japanese version of Mr. Pickles' Puppet Time who comes to America to shadow Jeff. He stays at Deirdre's home and eventually sleeps with her.
- Jernard Burks as Denny, the truck driver who crashed into the Piccirillo family's car, killing Phil
- Calah Lane as Denny's daughter, who looks after her father and takes care of him as he is harassed by those angry over Phil's death
- Riki Lindhome as Shaina, a former drug addict who turned her life around by watching Mr. Pickles' Puppet Time. After reading a letter from her, Jeff takes her out on a date.
- Annette O'Toole as Louise, Jeff and Deirdre's mother and Sebastian's ex-wife.
- Kelly Coffield Park as Joanne, Jeff and Jill's realtor

Puppeteers

- Mary Faber as Macy, the puppeteer of Soap Scum on Mr. Pickles' Puppet Time
- Dan Garza as Ennui La Triste, a talking French baguette puppet
- Gwen Hollander as Sheryl, the puppeteer of Astron-Otter on Mr. Pickles' Puppet Time
- Patrick Johnson as The Oops and Maestro Pimento Fermata
- Christian Anderson as Sy the Wide-Eyed Fly
- Mike Quinn as Secret Chef
- Barry Rothbart and Rich Fulcher as Bert and Clay, the two puppeteers of Snagglehorse on Mr. Pickles' Puppet Time

=== Guest ===
- Betty Thomas ("Green Means Go")
- Conan O'Brien as himself ("Green Means Go"), the eponymous host of Conan, on which Jeff is a guest
- Danny Trejo as himself ("Green Means Go"), Jeff's fellow guest on Conan
- T'Keyah Crystal Keymáh as Amika ("Pusillanimous"), the make-up artist for Mr. Pickles' Puppet Time
- Matt Evers as Ice Ennui ("LT. Pickles"), the ice-skating performer who portrays Ennui La Triste in the "Pickles On Ice-tacular"
- Ariana Grande as Piccola Grande ("Episode 3101"), the Pickle Fairy of Hope
- Dick Van Dyke as Hopskotch the Sasquatch ("Up, Down and Everything in Between" and "Episode 3101"), a giant puppet who is never seen in its entirety
- Tyler, the Creator as Cornell ("The Acceptance Speech"), who works at a nostalgia therapy center
- Blake Griffin as himself ("A Seat on the Rocket")

== Episodes ==
Kidding seasons
Season	Episodes	Originally released	
Season	Episodes	First released	Last released
1	10	September 9, 2018	November 11, 2018
2	10	February 9, 2020	March 8, 2020

=== Season 1 (2018) ===
Kidding, season 1 episodes
No. overall	No. in season	Title	Directed by	Written by	Original release date	U.S. viewers (millions)
1	1	"Green Means Go"	Michel Gondry	Dave Holstein	September 9, 2018 (Note: Episodes one and two were released early through Showtime's streaming applications.)	0.443
Following the one-year anniversary of his son Philip's death, Jeff Piccirillo appears on Conan and sings one of his well-known songs. While at the set of his television program Mr. Pickles' Puppet Time, he proposes producing an episode about the topic of death to Seb, the show's producer and his father, who quickly dismisses the idea. Jeff returns to the home he previously shared with his now separated wife Jill and their surviving son Will. Back at the set of the show, Jeff discusses his proposal for a death-centric episode again and Seb acquiesces. Later, Jeff's sister Dierdre goes home and tries to convince her daughter Maddy to eat her vegetables. She relents after Maddy reveals that earlier that day she saw her father Scott having a sexual encounter in the front yard. The next day, Jeff turns on the show expecting to see the episode about death air but instead finds that it has been replaced. Seb confirms this to him in a phone call and reminds him about not tarnishing his brand and image as Jeff partially shaves his head in spite. Jeff goes on to purchase the house for sale right next door to his prior one, where he sees his wife in the kitchen with another man.
2	2	"Pusillanimous"	Michel Gondry	Dave Holstein	September 16, 2018	0.290
3	3	"Every Pain Needs a Name"	Jake Schreier	Halley Feiffer	September 23, 2018	0.303
4	4	"Bye, Mom"	Jake Schreier	Michael Vukadinovich	September 30, 2018	0.281
5	5	"The New You"	Michel Gondry	Cody Heller	October 7, 2018	0.199
6	6	"The Cookie"	Michel Gondry	Noah Haidle	October 14, 2018	0.166
7	7	"Kintsugi"	Minkie Spiro	Jas Waters	October 21, 2018	0.192
8	8	"Philliam"	Minkie Spiro	Roberto Benabib	October 28, 2018	0.179
9	9	"LT. Pickles"	Michel Gondry	Joey Mazzarino & Dave Holstein	November 4, 2018	0.152
10	10	"Some Day"	Michel Gondry	Dave Holstein	November 11, 2018	0.224

=== Season 2 (2020) ===
Kidding, season 2 episodes
No. overall	No. in season	Title	Directed by	Written by	Original release date	U.S. viewers (millions)
11	1	"The Cleanest Liver in Columbus, Ohio"	Jake Schreier	Dave Holstein	February 9, 2020	0.120
12	2	"Up, Down and Everything in Between"	Jake Schreier	Michael Vukadinovich	February 9, 2020	0.085
13	3	"I'm Listening"	Kimberly Peirce	Roberto Benabib	February 16, 2020	0.081
14	4	"I Wonder What Grass Tastes Like"	Kimberly Peirce	Hilary Weisman Graham	February 16, 2020	0.043
15	5	"Episode 3101"	Michel Gondry	Joey Mazzarino	February 23, 2020	0.098
16	6	"The Death of Fil"	Michel Gondry	Dave Holstein	February 23, 2020	0.088
17	7	"The Acceptance Speech"	Bert & Bertie	Michael Vukadinovich	March 1, 2020	0.107
18	8	"A Seat on the Rocket"	Bert & Bertie	Jas Waters	March 1, 2020	0.076
19	9	"The Nightingale Pledge"	Jake Schreier	Dylan Tanous & Dave Holstein	March 8, 2020	0.140
20	10	"The Puppet Dalai Lama"	Jake Schreier	Dave Holstein	March 8, 2020	0.054

== Production ==
Promotional poster featuring Jim Carrey as Jeff Piccirillo.

=== Development ===
On September 14, 2017, it was announced that Showtime had given the production a straight-to-series order for a first season consisting of ten episodes. The series was created by Dave Holstein who also serves as executive producer alongside Jim Carrey, Michel Gondry, Jason Bateman, Jim Garavente, Raffi Adlan, and Michael Aguilar. Additionally, Holstein wrote the pilot episode and serves as showrunner and Gondry directed the pilot. On June 7, 2018, it was announced that the series would premiere on September 9, 2018.

On October 10, 2018, it was announced that Showtime had renewed the series for a second season consisting of ten episodes that were scheduled to premiere on November 3, 2019. However, in September 2019, Showtime announced that the second season would instead premiere on February 9, 2020. On July 14, 2020, Showtime canceled the series after two seasons.

=== Casting ===
Simultaneously with the announcement of the series order, it was confirmed that Jim Carrey had been cast in the series' lead role. On December 14, 2017, it was reported that Catherine Keener had been cast as the series' female lead. On January 4, 2018, it was announced that Frank Langella had joined the main cast in a series regular role. On February 13, 2018, it was reported that Judy Greer had also joined the main cast. On March 15, 2018, it was announced that Justin Kirk had been cast in a recurring role. In May 2018, it was reported that Ginger Gonzaga and Bernard White were joining the cast in a recurring capacity. On July 9, 2018, it was announced that Grace Song had been cast in a recurring role.

== Release ==
=== Marketing ===
On June 7, 2018, the series' first official trailer was released. About two weeks later, a teaser trailer featuring a song from the series was released. On August 6, 2018, the series' poster and the second official trailer were released.

=== Premiere ===
On September 5, 2018, the series held its official premiere at the Cinerama Dome in Los Angeles, California. Those in attendance included David Nevins, Judy Greer, Jim Carrey, Catherine Keener, and Dave Holstein.

=== Distribution ===
In Canada, the series airs on The Movie Network and CraveTV. In France, the series airs on Canal+ Séries. In the United Kingdom, the series has aired on Sky Atlantic, but it later moved to Sky Comedy. In Spain, the series airs on Movistar Series.

== Reception ==
=== Critical response ===
The series was met with a positive response from critics upon its premiere. On the review aggregation website Rotten Tomatoes, the first season holds a 77% approval rating, with an average rating of 7.4 out of 10 based on 78 reviews. The website's critical consensus reads, "Fans of Jim Carrey's slapstick may be disappointed, but other viewers may find a surprisingly poignant examination of life and grief in Kidding." Metacritic, which uses a weighted average, assigned the first season a score of 68 out of 100 based on 33 critics, indicating "generally favorable reviews".

In a positive review, Vox's Karen Han praised the series saying, "The deconstruction of a Fred Rogers figure would make for an interesting show on its own, but Kidding transcends that premise by leaps and bounds on the strength of Carrey's performance and a determination to make the show just as rough--and riveting--as real life." In another favorable critique, The Hollywood Reporter's Tim Goodman offered similar acclaim saying, "With its keen self-awareness, exceptional writing and consistently great acting, Kidding — starring a perfectly cast Jim Carrey in his first series-regular role since In Living Color two decades ago — is Showtime's best and most binge-worthy series in a long time." Ben Travers at IndieWire reviewed the first four episodes of the show, and called it an alt-reality Mr. Rogers, and that although the fixation on death is "uncomfortable, [...] it shows signs of a lighter, broader scope and is buoyed by unrelenting optimism." He praised the story for treating Jeff's sincerity with genuine respect, and Carrey for his "terrific" and "nuanced" performance. Kristen Baldwin of Entertainment Weekly gave it a B+ grade and called it a "bittersweet family saga" and is unsure of the direction of the show but "for now, it's a compelling story about the beauty, and difficulty, of giving your pain a name." In a more mixed assessment, Rolling Stone's Alan Sepinwall awarded the series three-and-a-half stars out of five and provided restrained admiration saying, "Carrey's worth the price of admission, though, even if it's not the TV comeback vehicle many of his fans would want. Heck, he'd probably be a huge hit just hosting a full-length version of the show within the show, rather than this version that only gives us innocent glimpses amidst all the mourning. But like Jeff Pickles, Carrey wants to lean into the harder parts of life. More often than not with Kidding, he succeeds."

In a negative evaluation, Uproxx's Pilot Viruet compared the series unfavorably to some of Showtime's past shows saying, "those series found ways to make the humor seem more natural, more fitting with the stories they're telling. Kidding's approach is more overt and frequently confusing, as if spotting a brightly-colored puppet wandering amongst our real world." Caroline Framke of Variety said that the show succeeds in places but more often than not it "feels caught between too many tones and ideas to become quite as distinctive as it could be." Framke wrote that over the first four episodes the show better understands TV personality and business of Mr. Pickles than it does of grieving father Jeff. Dave Nemetz of TVLine is critical of the tone of the show, saying it is "somewhere between comedy and drama, and isn't entirely successful at either."

The second season received positive reviews. On Rotten Tomatoes, the season holds a 100% approval rating, with an average rating of 8 out of 10 based on 11 reviews. The website's critical consensus reads, "Kidding lightens its emotional load just enough to craft a sophomore season that is brighter and sweeter and no less insightful than its first."

=== Ratings ===
==== Season 1 ====
Viewership and ratings per episode of Kidding
No.	Title	Air date	Rating (18–49)	Viewers (millions)	DVR viewers (millions)	Total viewers (millions)
1	"Green Means Go"	September 9, 2018	0.13	0.443	0.207	0.650
2	"Pusillanimous"	September 16, 2018	0.07	0.290	0.154	0.444
3	"Every Pain Needs a Name"	September 23, 2018	0.11	0.303	0.201	0.504
4	"Bye, Mom"	September 30, 2018	0.09	0.281	0.164	0.445
5	"The New You"	October 7, 2018	0.05	0.199	0.182	0.381
6	"The Cookie"	October 14, 2018	0.05	0.166	0.170	0.336
7	"Kintsugi"	October 21, 2018	0.06	0.192	0.116	0.308
8	"Philliam"	October 28, 2018	0.04	0.179	0.168	0.347
9	"LT. Pickles"	November 4, 2018	0.03	0.152	0.163	0.315
10	"Some Day"	November 11, 2018	0.04	0.224	0.165	0.389

==== Season 2 ====
Viewership and ratings per episode of Kidding
No.	Title	Air date	Rating (18–49)	Viewers (millions)	DVR viewers (millions)	Total viewers (millions)
1	"The Cleanest Liver in Columbus, Ohio"	February 9, 2020	0.03	0.120	0.131	0.251
2	"Up, Down and Everything in Between"	February 9, 2020	0.03	0.085	0.110	0.195
3	"I'm Listening"	February 16, 2020	0.01	0.081	0.118	0.199
4	"I Wonder What Grass Tastes Like"	February 16, 2020	0.01	0.043	0.089	0.132
5	"Episode 3101"	February 23, 2020	0.02	0.098	0.098	0.196
6	"The Death of Fil"	February 23, 2020	0.01	0.088	0.108	0.196
7	"The Acceptance Speech"	March 1, 2020	0.02	0.107	0.097	0.204
8	"A Seat on the Rocket"	March 1, 2020	0.02	0.076	0.066	0.142
9	"The Nightingale Pledge"	March 8, 2020	0.02	0.140	—N/a	—N/a
10	"The Puppet Dalai Lama"	March 8, 2020	0.01	0.054	—N/a	—N/a

=== Awards and nominations ===
Award nominations for Kidding
Year	Award	Category	Recipient(s)	Result	Ref.
2019	Golden Globe Awards	Best Television Series – Musical or Comedy	Kidding	Nominated	
2019	Golden Globe Awards	Best Actor – Television Series Musical or Comedy	Jim Carrey	Nominated	
2019	Golden Reel Awards	Broadcast Media: Live Action Under 35:00	"The Cookie"	Nominated	
2021	Irish Film & Television Awards	Best VFX	Ed Bruce and Robert Hartigan	Won	
