= Midnight Man (1995 film) =

- Directed by: John Weidner
- Written by: Moshe Diamant (Story); J.B. Lawrence
- Produced by: Alan Amiel
- Starring: Lorenzo Lamas; James Lew; Mako
- Cinematography: Garett Griffin
- Edited by: Brian L. Chambers
- Music by: Joel Goldsmith; Alex Wilkinson
- Production companies: A.N.A. MDP Worldwide
- Distributed by: Artisan Entertainment
- Release date: April 28, 1995
- Running time: 93 minutes
- Country: United States
- Language: English

Midnight Man (also known as Blood for Blood) is a 1995 direct-to-video action-thriller film written by J.B. Lawrence, produced by Alan Amiel and directed by John Weidner. The film stars Lorenzo Lamas, James Lew, and Mako.

== Plot ==
LAPD Detective John Kang (Lamas) dreams of a quiet life with his wife and child, but after a blown surveillance operation, those dreams quickly turn bloody when he is targeted for assassination by a ruthless Cambodian warlord. Plagued by memories of a forgotten childhood and trapped in the middle of a brutal gang war, Kang must fight to save his family as the world's deadliest hitman closes in for the kill.

== Cast ==
- Lorenzo Lamas as Detective John Kang
- James Lew as Prince Samarki
- Mako as Buun Som
- Eric Pierpoint as Paddy White
- James Shigeta as Mao Mak
- Diane DiLascio as Lilly Kang
- James T. Callahan as Chief Massey
- Jamie Renee Smith as Molly Kang
- Steven Vincent Leigh as Tango
- Juli Donald as Bridgette
- Bill Bolender as Randy
- Ronald Hunter as Boris
- Sigal Diamant as Officer Cooper
- Michael Watson as Ilyia
- Jeff Griggs as Steve Lopez
- Brett Baxter Clark as Al Gregory
- Gerald Hopkins as Spocheck
- Brooks Gardner as Lieutenant Chaliapin
- Doug Yasuda as Huoy
- Raymond Ma as Billy Tan
- Arsenio "Sonny" Trinidad as Lord Mao Tan
- Darryl Fong as Ray Lee
- Ilia Volok as Slav
- Tia Riebling as Carla
- Victoria Hawley as Asia
- David Rowe as Kudo
- Lelagi Togisala as Gang Banger
- Michael Ballew as Truck Driver
- Tom Bloom as Soviet Bodyguard
- Andy Langham as Bouncer

== Reception ==
Chris The Brain from Bullets Points Action wrote: "Midnight Man was an enjoyable film that featured a quality cast and some quality martial arts action. But to me it was all the little extras that helped take it from regular Cheeseburger Macaroni to Cheeseburger Macaroni with crumbled bacon on top!" Matt Poirier from Direct to Video Connoisseur gave it a bad review and stated: "It seems like Lamas has more stinkers than classics, and this is definitely in that former category. It wasn't just that it had limited action, it was the crap that went on when there wasn't action that hurt so much. Sometimes these actioners try too hard to be something other than an actioner, and as a result, we get something messier than it had to be." Jack Sommersby from eFilmCritic gave the movie two stars and wrote: "The made-for-cable-TV Midnight Man isn't thrilling or swiftly enough paced to generate much in the way of excitement, and with a rather sodden hero at its center, it's not terribly interesting, either."
