= 68 Whiskey =

2020 American military comedy-drama television series

- Promotional release poster
- Genre: Military; Comedy drama
- Created by: Roberto Benabib
- Based on: Charlie Golf One (Taagad) by Zion Rubin
- Starring: Sam Keeley; Gage Golightly; Cristina Rodlo; Jeremy Tardy; Nicholas Coombe; Derek Theler; Beth Riesgraf; Lamont Thompson
- Country of origin: United States
- Original language: English
- No. of seasons: 1
- No. of episodes: 10

Production
- Executive producers: Ron Howard; Roberto Benabib; Brian Grazer; Francie Calfo; Zion Rubin; Efrat Shmaya Dror; Danna Stern; Samie Kim Falvey; Michael Lehmann
- Running time: 43–47 minutes
- Production companies: Spike Cable Networks, Inc; CBS Television Studios; Imagine Television Studios; yes Studios; Little City Ironworks

Original release
- Network: Paramount Network
- Release: January 15 – March 18, 2020

68 Whiskey is an American military comedy-drama television series created by Roberto Benabib. Based on the Israeli television series Charlie Golf One (known as Taagad in Hebrew: תאג"ד), it premiered on January 15, 2020, on the Paramount Network. In September 2020, the series was canceled after one season.

== Cast and characters ==
=== Main ===
- Sam Keeley as Cooper Roback
- Gage Golightly as Grace Durkin
- Cristina Rodlo as Sergeant Rosa Alvarez
- Jeremy Tardy as Staff Sergeant Mekhi Davis
- Nicholas Coombe as Anthony Petrocelli
- Fahim Fazli as warlord
- Derek Theler as Sasquatch
- Beth Riesgraf as Major Sonia Holloway
- Lamont Thompson as Colonel Harlan Austin

=== Recurring ===
- Usman Ally as Captain Hazara
- Artur Benson as Khalil
- Aaron Glenane as Chef Colin Gale
- Linc Hand as Crash
- Jade Albany as Cassola
- Omar Maskati as Qasem

== Episodes ==
No.	Title	Directed by	Written by	Original release date	U.S. viewers (millions)
1	"Buckley's Goat"	Michael Lehmann	Roberto Benabib	January 15, 2020	0.87
2	"Finger Lickin' Good"	Michael Lehmann	Roberto Benabib	January 22, 2020	0.56
3	"Daddy Issues"	Erin Feeley	Roberto Benabib	January 29, 2020	0.51
4	"Trouble in River City"	Michael Lehmann	Mark Stegemann	February 5, 2020	0.41
5	"Pain Management"	Michael Lehmann	Kim Benabib	February 12, 2020	0.41
6	"Fight or Flight"	David Petrarca	Caitie Delaney	February 19, 2020	0.39
7	"Mister Fix-It"	Erin Feeley	Dylan Park-Pettiford	February 26, 2020	0.35
8	"Do the Right Thing"	Michael Trim	Dave Holstein	March 4, 2020	0.50
9	"No Good Deed..."	Erin Feeley	Roberto Benabib & Mark Stegemann	March 11, 2020	0.53
10	"Close Your Eyes and Jump"	Michael Lehmann	Roberto Benabib & Dave Holstein	March 18, 2020	0.47

== Production ==
=== Development ===
On July 9, 2018, it was announced that Paramount Network had given the production a pilot order. The pilot was directed by Michael Lehmann and written by Roberto Benabib who were also set to executive produce alongside Brian Grazer, Francie Calfo, Zion Rubin, Efrat Shmaya Dror, Danna Stern, Samie Kim Falvey and Michael Lehmann. On April 30, 2019, it was reported that Paramount Network had given the production a series order for a first season consisting of ten episodes. Production companies involved with the series were slated to consist of CBS Television Studios, Imagine Television, and yes Studios. The series premiered on January 15, 2020. On September 2, 2020, Paramount Network canceled the series after one season.

In an extended Twitter thread in 2021, staff writer Dylan Park-Pettiford and story editor Caitie Delaney revealed that a writer on the series fabricated a career in the Marines in order to get a job, and was only found out and removed mid-season due to Park-Pettiford's suspicions.

=== Casting ===
In September 2019, it was announced that Sam Keeley, Gage Golightly, Cristina Rodlo, Jeremy Tardy, Nicholas Coombe, Derek Theler, Beth Riesgraf, and Lamont Thompson were cast as series regulars while Usman Ally, Artur Benson, and Aaron Glenane were cast in recurring roles. In October 2019, Linc Hand and Jade Albany joined the cast in recurring capacities.

== Reception ==
=== Critical response ===
On the review aggregation website Rotten Tomatoes, the series holds an approval rating of 88% with an average rating of 6/10, based on 8 reviews. Metacritic, which uses a weighted average, assigned the series a score of 61 out of 100 based on 4 critics, indicating "generally favorable reviews".

=== Ratings ===
Viewership and ratings per episode of 68 Whiskey
No.	Title	Air date	Rating (18–49)	Viewers (millions)	DVR (18–49)	DVR viewers (millions)	Total (18–49)	Total viewers (millions)
1	"Buckley's Goat"	January 15, 2020	0.2	0.87	—N/a	1.31	—N/a	2.17
2	"Finger Lickin' Good"	January 22, 2020	0.1	0.56	—N/a	1.24	—N/a	1.80
3	"Daddy Issues"	January 29, 2020	0.1	0.51	—N/a	1.08	—N/a	1.59
4	"Trouble in River City"	February 5, 2020	0.1	0.41	—N/a	0.93	—N/a	1.34
5	"Pain Management"	February 12, 2020	0.1	0.41	—N/a	—N/a	—N/a	—N/a
6	"Fight or Flight"	February 19, 2020	0.1	0.39	—N/a	—N/a	—N/a	—N/a
7	"Mister Fix-It"	February 26, 2020	0.1	0.35	—N/a	1.09	—N/a	1.44
8	"Do the Right Thing"	March 4, 2020	0.1	0.50	—N/a	0.92	—N/a	1.42
9	"No Good Deed..."	March 11, 2020	0.1	0.53	TBD	TBD	TBD	TBD
10	"Close Your Eyes and Jump"	March 18, 2020	0.1	0.47	TBD	TBD	TBD	TBD
