= New Warriors (TV pilot) =

Unaired Marvel Television pilot

- Genre: Action; Adventure; Mockumentary; Science fiction; Superhero; Comedy
- Created by: Kevin Biegel
- Based on: New Warriors by: Tom DeFalco; Ron Frenz
- Written by: Kevin Biegel
- Starring: Milana Vayntrub; Derek Theler; Jeremy Tardy; Calum Worthy; Matthew Moy; Kate Comer
- Country of origin: United States
- Original language: English

Production
- Executive producers: Jim Chory; Jeph Loeb; Kevin Biegel
- Camera setup: Single-camera
- Running time: 30 minutes
- Production companies: ABC Signature Studios; Marvel Television

Related
- Marvel Cinematic Universe television series

Marvel's New Warriors is an unaired American television pilot created and written by Kevin Biegel for Freeform, based on the Marvel Comics superhero team of the same name. It was intended to be set in the Marvel Cinematic Universe (MCU) and acknowledge the continuity of the franchise's films and other television series. The pilot was produced by ABC Signature Studios and Marvel Television.

The pilot stars Milana Vayntrub as Doreen Green / Squirrel Girl and Derek Theler as Craig Hollis / Mr. Immortal, who make up the New Warriors along with Jeremy Tardy, Calum Worthy, Matthew Moy, and Kate Comer. The young group learn to cope with their new abilities in a terrifying world while being filmed for a documentary. By August 2016, Marvel Television had developed a series centered on the New Warriors and began offering it to cable networks and streaming outlets. In April 2017, New Warriors received a series order of 10 episodes from Freeform, with Biegel joining as showrunner and writing the first script. The pilot had been produced by November 2017.

New Warriors was planned to premiere in 2018 on Freeform, and had the potential to launch multiple spinoff series based on each of the New Warriors characters. However, by November 2017, the network no longer had room in its schedule to begin airing the series in 2018, and returned it to Marvel Television so the studio could shop the series to other Disney-owned networks. These efforts were ultimately unsuccessful, and the series was officially considered dead by the end of September 2019.

== Premise ==
Six superpowered young people with powers different from the Avengers want to make a positive impact in the world, even if they are not quite ready to be heroes. Tasked with protecting Cleveland, Ohio, their exploits are captured by a documentary crew.

== Cast and characters ==
- Milana Vayntrub as Doreen Green / Squirrel Girl:
  A tough, optimistic fangirl, who is also a natural leader with acrobat skills and superhuman strength, and can move and fight like a squirrel. She has a squirrel sidekick named Tippy-Toe that she can communicate with. Vayntrub's costume was inspired by the character's design in The Unbeatable Squirrel Girl comic series.
- Derek Theler as Craig Hollis / Mr. Immortal: The New Warriors' "resident troublemaker and lothario" who claims that he cannot die, and has a cocky and grumpy personality.
- Jeremy Tardy as Dwayne Taylor / Night Thrasher: A local celebrity with no superpowers, who has his own YouTube channel. Taylor's parents died when he was younger, leaving him with his family's fortune.
- Calum Worthy as Robbie Baldwin / Speedball: An immature and impulsive person, who can toss kinetic balls of energy, though he lacks good aim.
- Matthew Moy as Zach Smith / Microbe: A shy hypochondriac who can communicate with germs, and is looking for a group of people to hang out with.
- Kate Comer as Deborah Fields / Debrii: A low-level telekinetic trickster who is a lesbian and has suffered personal loss due to the actions of other superheroes.

Keith David was cast as Ernest Vigman, a municipal employee, which would have been a recurring role.

== Production ==
=== Development ===
By the end of August 2016, Marvel Television and ABC Studios were developing a half-hour comedy series based on the New Warriors featuring Squirrel Girl, with the series being offered to cable networks and streaming outlets. In April 2017, Freeform ordered Marvel's New Warriors straight-to-series for 10 episodes, marking Marvel's first foray into single-camera live-action comedy, and their first half-hour series. Kevin Biegel was nearing a deal to write a script and serve as showrunner for the series, after Marvel had attached him to the project before Freeform's involvement. Jeph Loeb, the head of Marvel Television, and Jim Chory were set to executive produce the series alongside Biegel. The series was planned to have a mockumentary format, with the documentary crew following the members of the New Warriors as they try to protect Cleveland, Ohio.

Karey Burke, Executive Vice President of Programming and Development at Freeform, said the network had interest in a Squirrel Girl series before Marvel was moving forward with the project, and before Freeform ordered their other Marvel series, Marvel's Cloak & Dagger. Burke also felt Freeform was the best network for New Warriors, believing that Marvel had "started to see our strength with young adults" following the success of Cloak & Dagger, and both companies wanted to "find the right characters that felt like they would speak directly to Freeform's audience. The Avengers wouldn't work here but the about-to-be-Avengers works here." On whether the network would consider spinoff series for each of the characters on the New Warriors team, in a similar fashion to Marvel's Netflix television series, Burke felt they "absolutely" could given the characters Marvel chose "are all really singular and could each carry the show that they're on. They're bound together ... for as long as we choose with this show but it's conceptually tailor-made for spinoffs." Biegel was confirmed as showrunner in July 2017, and production on the pilot episode had taken place by that November. Demi Adejuyigbe was part of the series' writing team. The Great Lakes Avengers inspired various elements of the planned series.

=== Casting ===
Casting was expected to begin "shortly" after the series was announced in April 2017. Burke noted that actresses Anna Kendrick and Shannon Purser, who had both publicly expressed interest in portraying Squirrel Girl, had been discussed for that role. She added that the network had historically "made a lot of stars", but noted that the character put them in a unique position, saying, "The character is such a calling card. I'm interested to see if name actresses feel right for it." Kendrick later admitted that she thought she had given "one of those answers that just goes away" and had no real interest in the role. By July 2017, Purser and Mae Whitman, who had also publicly expressed interest in the role, were among those who had been seriously considered for the part, with the character having been written with Whitman in mind. Discussions of Whitman were cut short due to her commitments to the series Good Girls. In early July, the series cast was announced, with Milana Vayntrub as Doreen Green / Squirrel Girl, and Derek Theler as the series' co-lead Craig Hollis / Mr. Immortal. Also announced were Jeremy Tardy as Dwayne Taylor / Night Thrasher, Calum Worthy as Robbie Baldwin / Speedball, Matthew Moy as Zach Smith / Microbe, and Kate Comer as Deborah Fields / Debrii. YouTuber and voice actor SungWon Cho was also in contention for Microbe. In late July 2017, Keith David was cast in the recurring role of Ernest Vigman for the series. In June 2020, Biegel revealed he had a "seasons-long plan" for David to become the character M.O.D.O.K.

=== Marvel Cinematic Universe tie-ins ===
Discussing the potential for New Warriors to connect to Cloak & Dagger in April 2017, Burke said that the two properties were "not particularly connected" given "their tones are so wildly different", adding, "There are many degrees of separation with where they fall in the Marvel universe. But anything is possible with Marvel." That July, Loeb said there were no plans to crossover the two series, nor to crossover them across networks with the similarly youth-oriented Marvel's Runaways on Hulu. He added that Marvel wanted New Warriors to find its footing before further connecting with other elements of the Marvel Cinematic Universe (MCU), saying, "You'll see things that comment on each other; we try to touch base wherever we can... It's being aware of it and trying to find a way for it to be able to discuss in a way that makes sense."

== Cancellation ==
In November 2017, New Warriors was no longer set to air on Freeform. The completed pilot was said to have "tested through the roof", with high-level executives at Disney taking interest in the project. Marvel wanted the series to air in 2018, but Freeform found that it did not have room in its schedule for the series, and agreed to give the project back to Marvel; the studio would shop the series to new partners who could release the series in 2018, potentially only looking at companies that are Disney-owned, and hoping to secure a two-season pick-up from the new network. The series was still considered to be likely to produce multiple spinoffs in a similar model to Marvel's Netflix shows. Production on the remainder of New Warriors was scheduled to resume in January 2018, pending the series being picked up by a new network.

Loeb stated in June 2018 that Marvel Television was still looking for a network to air the series. The studio discussed moving the series to Disney's streaming services Disney+ and Hulu, but neither broadcaster was interested in picking up the series. By the end of September 2019, New Warriors was officially considered to be dead.

In September 2021, Biegel shared several behind-the-scenes images from the pilot, including Vayntrub in costume and various sets such as a bedroom with several Iron Man posters and a restaurant named "Fabian's" after Marvel comic writer Fabian Nicieza. He also shared footage from filming, including of the animatronic used to depict Green's pet squirrel Tippy-Toe. He stated that the pilot had strong LGBTQ themes and believed an executive had prevented it from being made due to it being "too gay". A Marvel spokesman addressed Biegel's claims by saying that Marvel had been "fully supportive of the show" and it was only canceled after various distributors had passed on the series.

Vayntrub would go on to voice Squirrel Girl in multiple other Marvel productions, including the Marvel Rising animated franchise, Marvel's Squirrel Girl: The Unbeatable Radio Show podcast, and Marvel Rivals video game, while the character of Mr. Immortal would eventually make his MCU debut in Marvel Studios' Disney+ series She-Hulk: Attorney at Law, portrayed by David Pasquesi.

== See also ==
- List of unproduced television projects based on Marvel Comics
