= Derek Theler =

American actor, model (born 1986)

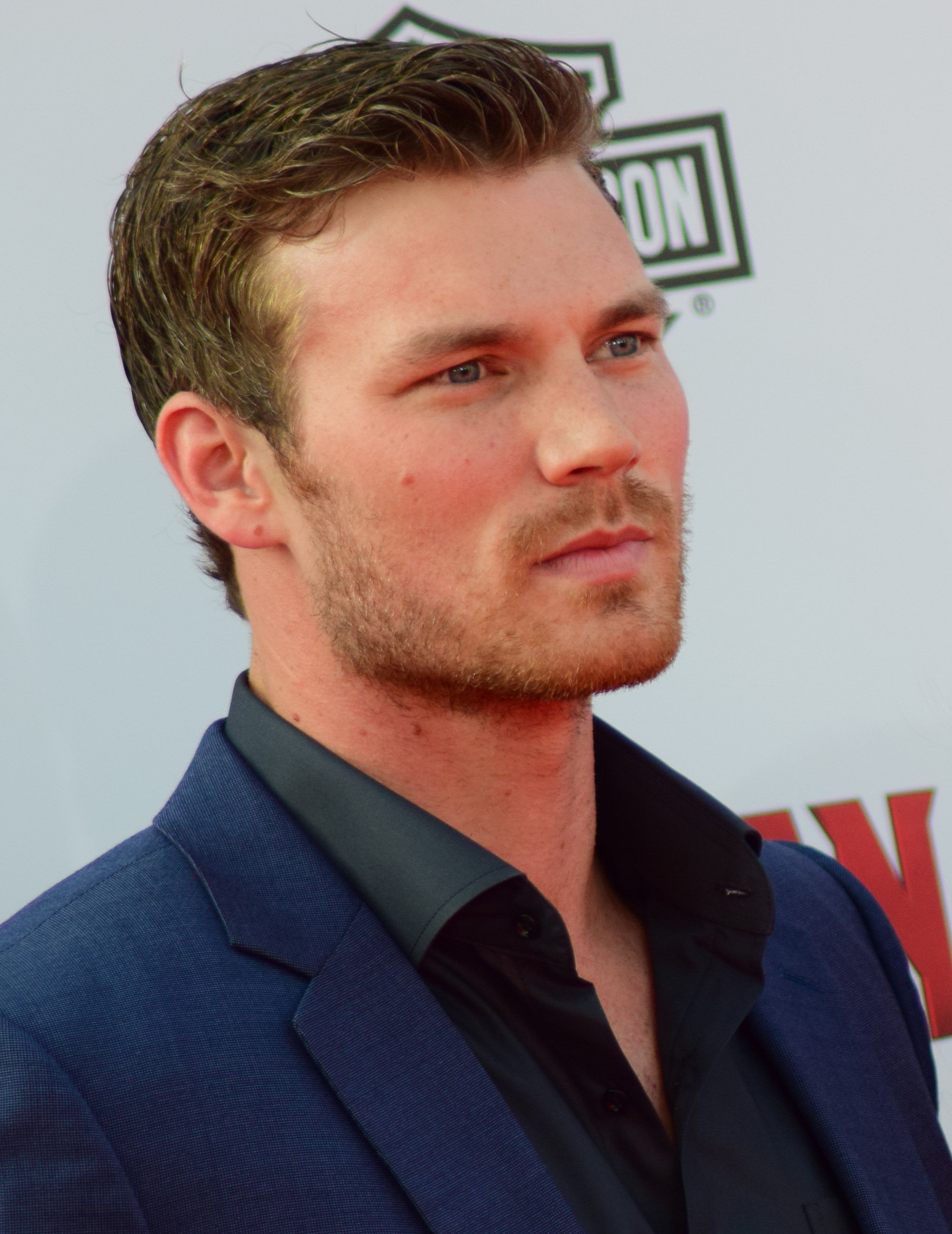
- Theler at the Dolby Theatre in Hollywood, California
- Born: October 29, 1986 (age 40); Alaska
- Education: Colorado State University
- Occupations: Actor; model
- Years active: 2007–present
- Spouse: Lisa Marie Summerscales (m. 2022)
- Children: 1
- Modeling information
- Height: 6 ft 6.5 in (199 cm)
- Hair color: Blond
- Eye color: Blue
- Agency: Donna Baldwin Agency

Derek Theler (born October 29, 1986) is an American actor, writer, producer and model. He is best known for portraying Danny on Baby Daddy (2012–2017).

== Acting career ==
Theler started his acting career in 2009, starring in several minor roles in TV series such as The Middle, Cougar Town, and The Hills.

In between acting gigs, Theler appeared as a model in TV commercials. He first landed a Coke Zero commercial in 2009. This was followed by a campaign for State Farm, in which he played a "hot guy" who was conjured up by three women. He has also participated in commercials for Nike, Kayak.com, Arby's, and Verizon.

Aside from acting, Theler was also the writer and executive producer of a short film called Intrusion.

In 2012, Theler landed his first major role when he was cast in the ABC Family comedy Baby Daddy, playing Danny Wheeler, the brother of the title character. Theler starred the same year as Riggins in the web series Project S.E.R.A.

In 2015, Theler starred as Chase Walker in the movie Shark Killer, which was released on June 16, 2015 via digital download. Theler played the role of shark killer who hunts down a black-finned shark that swallowed a valuable diamond during a gang transaction. He also starred as Jordan in the Christmas movie How Sarah Got Her Wings, which was released on digital HD and video on demand (VOD) on November 1, 2015. The Christmas movie premiered on Ion Television on December 6, 2015.

On November 19, 2015, Theler starred in the Funny or Die parody titled Chicago Sanitation. In 2016, Theler starred as Jake Kenman in the family movie Secret Summer, which was released on April 2, 2016 on PixL (On Demand and YouTube). He also played the role of Huntsman on the short Princess Rap Battle, released on YouTube on April 6, 2016.

In 2017, Theler starred as Chris in the short film Brotherly Love alongside Krista Kalmus. The same year, Theler was cast as Craig Hollis / Mister Immortal in the planned Marvel Cinematic Universe series New Warriors. The series notoriously lost its distributor before it could air proper and was ultimately cancelled. He guest starred in an episode of ABC comedy American Housewife as Dirk. In 2018, he played the role of Aric Dacia/X-O Manowar in the Valiant Entertainment's Ninjak vs. the Valiant Universe. He also guest starred as Conan in the YouTube series Wayne and as Thor a.k.a. Donar the Great in the Starz series American Gods. Theler guest starred in Hulu's web comedy series Dollface playing the role of Ryan, a man Jules has a fling with.

On September 24, 2019, Theler was cast as Sasquatch in the Paramount Network military series 68 Whiskey. In 2022, he guest starred as Billy McShane in an episode of Leverage: Redemption. In 2026, Theler starred as Iverson in the horror film Deadlocked: Dad of the Dead.

== Personal life ==
Theler was diagnosed with Type 1 diabetes at age 3.

Theler attended Colorado State University in Fort Collins, Colorado.

Theler started dating actress Lisa Marie Summerscales in May 2016. In July 2022, Theler announced on his Instagram that he and Summerscales had become engaged. They were married that September, his former Baby Daddy co-star Melissa Peterman officiated his wedding.

Theler is 6 ft 6.5 in (199 cm) tall.

== Filmography ==
=== Film ===
Year	Title	Role	Notes
2009	G Love	Cliff	Short film
2010	Intrusion	Mike Myers	Short film
2010	Valentine's Day	Masseur	Uncredited
2010	Get Him to the Greek	Standard guest	Uncredited
2011	Katherine Heigl Hates Balls	Model	Short film
2011	Camp Virginovich	Derek Moore	
2015	Shark Killer	Chase Walker	
2015	How Sarah Got Her Wings	Jordan	
2015	Chicago Sanitation	Sanitation Worker	Short film
2016	Secret Summer	Jake Kenman	
2017	Brotherly Love	Chris	Short film
2026	Deadlocked: Dad of the Dead	Iverson	
2026	Quarter	Dylan	Post-production

=== Television ===
Year	Title	Role	Notes
2007	The Hills	Himself	Guest star in episode "New Year, New Friends"
2009	Cougar Town	Beach Guy	Episode: "Two Gunslingers" (uncredited)
2009	The Middle	Sound Guy	Episode "The Scratch" (uncredited)
2009–2010	The Tonight Show with Conan O'Brien	Bike Cop / Loki	Uncredited
2010	Vampire Zombie Werewolf	Derekktor	
2011	Conan	All-star / Thor	
2011	90210	Shawn	2 episodes
2012	Project S.E.R.A.	Riggins	Web series
2012–2017	Baby Daddy	Danny Wheeler	Main cast
2017	American Housewife	Dirk, The Pig Whisperer	Episode: "The Pig Whisperer"
2018	Marvel's New Warriors	Craig Hollis / Mister Immortal	Unsold pilot
2019	Wayne	Conan	Episode: "Buckle The F**k Up"
2019	American Gods	Donar the Great	Episode: "Donar the Great"
2019	Dollface	Ryan	Episode: "F*** Buddy"
2020	68 Whiskey	Sasquatch	Main role
2022	Leverage: Redemption	Billy McShane	Episode: "The Turkish Prisoner Job"
2023	The Villains of Valley View	Blue Granite	3 episodes
2023	The Naughty Nine	Bruno	TV movie

=== Web series ===
Year	Title	Role	Notes
2016	Princess Rap Battle	Huntsman	
2018	Ninjak vs. the Valiant Universe	X-O Manowar	

=== Music ===
Year	Title	Role	Notes
2009	Rihanna - Hard ft Jeezy	Real Soldier #10	Actor/model

== Awards and nominations ==
Year	Award	Category	Nominated work	Result
2013	Teen Choice Awards	Choice TV: Breakout	Baby Daddy	Nominated
2016	Teen Choice Awards	Choice TV: Liplock: shared with Chelsea Kane	Baby Daddy	Nominated
