= Prey (2024 film) =

- Directed by: Mukunda Michael Dewil
- Written by: Mukunda Michael Dewil
- Produced by: Robert Ogden Barnum; Lucas Jarach; Christian Ackerman; Mukunda Michael Dewil
- Starring: Ryan Phillippe; Emile Hirsch; Dylan Flashner; Tristan Thompson; Jeremy Tardy; Michaela Sasner; Mena Suvari
- Cinematography: Farhad Ahmed Dehlvi
- Edited by: Miriam Arndt
- Music by: Pressure Cooker Studios
- Production companies: Voltage Pictures; Lucky 13 Productions; The Barnum Picture Company; Greenlight Pictures
- Distributed by: Vertical
- Release date: March 15, 2024
- Running time: 86 minutes
- Country: United States
- Language: English
- Box office: $51,163

Prey is a 2024 American action thriller film written and directed by Mukunda Michael Dewil and starring Ryan Phillippe and Emile Hirsch, with Dylan Flashner, Tristan Thompson, Jeremy Tardy, Michaela Sasner, and Mena Suvari in supporting roles. It was released on March 15, 2024, by Vertical.

== Plot ==
A young couple, Andrew and Sue, are compelled to leave their Christian missionary station in the Kalahari Desert after being threatened with death by an extremist militant gang. After saying goodbye to the people in their village, they travel to a remote airport where a small plane is waiting, piloted by self-interested Grun, to take other passengers out of the region. At first, they are told they have to pay up a larger fee or they will not be able to board. After some negotiations, they are allowed to board, but without most of their belongings.

During the flight, they experience severe turbulence and determine the small plane is overweight. Grun loses control of the plane and they crash, killing Chrissy. The rest of the survivors are unharmed except for Sue who is trapped underneath one of the seats of the plane. The survivors attempt to free her but are unsuccessful. An aerial shot shows the cockpit of the plane has been separated from what's left of the fuselage. Grun deduces based on their flight time that they crashed in the Ngala Reserve, where big game such as lions and cheetahs live and hunt. He also reasons there is a village they can walk to and commands the group of survivors to leave immediately.

Unable to successfully free Sue from the wreckage, Andrew opts to stay with her while the rest of the group goes to find rescue. Thabo, a guide to the rich Tyler, urges the couple to join them, saying their chances of survival alone are very slim. Andrew replies that they'll be fine. Grun, Tyler, Max, and Thabo leave them behind and go in search of rescue.

During the journey, Max exclaims that he thinks they're going the wrong way and it doesn't "feel right". Grun replies that he knows where he's going and they need to keep moving.

Back at the plane, Andrew searches through the cargo for supplies and finds rhino horns that Grun had been smuggling. He deduces that Grun was the same pilot who was supposed to bring medical supplies to the village but never arrived due to his smuggling operation.

The group of survivors journeys across the desert only to conclude that they've been going in the wrong direction the whole time. Max, in a desperate panic, grabs the gun away from Grun and points it at him, calling him a "murderer" for killing Chrissy in the crash. He demands the group head west declaring he knows where to go. Max then separates from the group to go off on his own while the rest head back to the plane.

Upon returning to the wreckage, they find that Sue has been killed by lions. Andrew attacks Grun, claiming he "killed" Sue. Thabo shoots him with a flare gun to stop the attack. Grun then declares that Thabo has used their only flare. Grun explains to the group that the lions will return at night and they need to find shelter, they can hide inside the detached cockpit of the plane which locks, but it will only hold 3 people (the group is now 4).

Andrew reveals to the group that Grun has been smuggling rhino horns. They argue over how their situation could have been prevented.

The group flips a coin to determine who will spend the night outside. Tyler loses but attempts to bribe the others to let him in the cockpit saying he'll pay them a million dollars to trade places with him. This doesn't work and the group is unconvinced. As night falls, Grun explains to Tyler that as long as he keeps the fire going, he'll be fine. The rest of the group crams themselves into the cockpit and they lock the door.

During the night, the survivors hear gunfire in the distance and deduce it is Max who still has Grun's gun. Max runs out of bullets and is presumably killed by lions. Grun leaves the cockpit to urinate, but inadvertently lets in a snake. He wakes up Tyler who has fallen asleep and tells him to stay awake and keep the fire going. Tyler again falls asleep and lets the fire go out. Lions attack him as the survivors in the cockpit realize the presence of the deadly snake and it bites Thabo's leg. Andrew opens the wound to extract the venom and save Thabo from death.

The next day, the group decides to search for rescue. Grun fashions a makeshift crutch for Thabo to walk with. Andrew says he will stay, having given up on their chances of being rescued. The two set off, only to find a vehicle approaching their direction. However, the vehicle is carrying a small group of armed Zulus who question the survivors about their smuggled rhino horns and accuse them of "stealing" from them. Thabo attempts to reason with the Zulus but instead is shot and killed by them. The Zulu leader goes off to get a truck, leaving the remaining 2 survivors with 2 Zulus. The Zulus fall asleep while guarding the survivors and Grun decides to attempt to disarm them. They wake up and scuffle with the weapons, which fire and inadvertently kill both Zulus.

Grun and an injured Andrew set off once again in search of rescue. They come to a rock formation that provides temporary shelter from the approaching lions. However, the wind alerts the lions to their presence and they attack. Grun sacrifices himself to the lions to save Andrew who is too weak to move.

Andrew wanders alone until he collapses from exhaustion. He hears hyenas in the distance approaching. He grabs a large branch in an attempt to defend himself. Just as the hyenas attack, a lightning strike scares them away and it begins to rain. Andrew again collapses as he envisions his wife coming for him. He is picked up by a couple of villagers and helped to safety.

== Cast ==
- Ryan Phillippe as Andrew
- Emile Hirsch as Grun
- Dylan Flashner as Tyler
- Tristan Thompson as Max
- Jeremy Tardy as Thabo
- Michaela Sasner as Chrissy
- Mena Suvari as Sue
- Hakeemshady Mohamed as Scar

== Production ==
In May 2023, it was announced that production on the film, then titled Kalahari, had wrapped.

== Release ==
The film was released on March 15, 2024.
