= Little City =

- Directed by: Roberto Benabib
- Written by: Roberto Benabib
- Produced by: Jeffrey L. Davidson; Beau Flynn; Stefan Simchowitz; Ron Wechsler
- Starring: Jon Bon Jovi; Josh Charles; Joanna Going; Penelope Ann Miller; Annabella Sciorra; JoBeth Williams
- Cinematography: Randall Love
- Edited by: Norman Buckley; Sloane Klevin
- Music by: Mader
- Production company: Bandeira Entertainment
- Distributed by: Miramax Films
- Release dates: April 4, 1997 (LA Film Festival); February 20, 1998 (United States)
- Running time: 90 minutes
- Country: United States
- Language: English

Little City is a 1997 romantic comedy film written and directed by Roberto Benabib. The film stars Jon Bon Jovi, Josh Charles, Joanna Going, Penelope Ann Miller, Annabella Sciorra, and JoBeth Williams. The film follows the intersecting love lives of a group of single twentysomethings in San Francisco.

Little City premiered at the 1997 LA Film Festival and was given a limited release on February 20, 1998. In the UK, the film was released straight-to-video.

== Plot ==
In an AA support group, womanizing bartender Kevin is talking about how he thought his relationships with women would change after he stopped drinking. Kevin sees a woman he wants, but loses interest in her after he gets her. He realizes this is not a healthy relationship pattern but does not know how to change it.

Rebecca, a single woman new to the "small town" of San Francisco, applies for a bartender job at the same bar Kevin works at. Although Kevin comes onto Rebecca immediately, she recognizes Kevin's playboy ways and rebuffs him; however, the two become good friends. Adam, Kevin's friend who drives a cab to support himself while he pursues his passion for painting, confides in Kevin about his girlfriend Nina and his suspicions she is having an affair. When Adam tries to initiate sex with Nina later at home, she tells him she is tired. Quickly realizing he may become suspicious, Nina changes her mind and decides to sleep with him; although, unbeknownst to Adam, she has just come back from sleeping with her lover.

Kevin and Nina meet in a Catholic church where he tells her that Adam suspects she is cheating on him. Nina is alarmed and asks Kevin if Adam knows who her lover is. It is revealed Kevin is the man with whom she is cheating on Adam with, stemming from her feelings of being neglected by Adam. The two express guilt over deceiving Adam, but they also acknowledge they cannot stay away from each other. Nina also feels that Adam is not over his ex-girlfriend, Kate, who left him for another woman, Anne, after coming out as a lesbian.

Adam, figuring out Kevin is the man sleeping with Nina, confronts him at the bar where Kevin and Rebecca work. Kevin argues Adam was not treating Nina right and claims Adam is not truly in love with her because he has not gotten over his ex. Adam recognizes some truth in what Kevin says, but he still angrily smashes a shot glass against the bar wall before storming out.

Rebecca, being new in town and unlucky in love, meets Anne at a coffee shop. Even though she does not have a serious interest in being a lesbian, she decides to sleep with Anne to see if it excites her more than sleeping with men, which has so far been underwhelming for her. Her first lesbian experience with Anne is interrupted by Kate who returns home early after finally coming out of the closet to her parents. Catching Anne and Rebecca in bed together, Kate walks out. Rebecca, realizing she is not really a lesbian, does not see Anne again out of embarrassment.

Kate is left heartbroken by Anne's transgression. Anne, on the other hand, has been looking for a reason to break it off with Kate, who is the younger of the two and more serious about the relationship. Anne does not like the domestic routine the two have settled into and tells Kate that she has never been very good at monogamy.

After confronting Nina about her affair with Kevin, Adam and Nina break up. Learning Kate is no longer with Anne, Adam sees it as an opportunity to get back together with her, although she tells him it's not possible. Adam meets Rebecca when he picks her up in his cab on her way to a blind date. They recognize each other from his blow-up in the bar and are instantly attracted to each other. Although Rebecca warns Adam that she is not very comfortable with her own body and does not feel terribly connected to it in bed, Rebecca discovers sex with Adam is better than any experience she has had before.

With Nina and Adam's relationship over, Kevin tells Nina that their relationship was not only sex and that he's in love with her. Nina, knowing Kevin's past indiscretions of dumping women after he sleeps with them and loses interest, does not believe his declaration and tells him she does not want to see him again. Meanwhile, Adam and Rebecca are happy until Kate calls him and tells him she wants to get back together and wants him to father a child. He is initially angry with Kate, telling her that her timing is way off and he is now seeing someone else. After thinking it over, he regretfully breaks up with Rebecca to get back with Kate. Hurt, Rebecca tells Adam that she is the one that broke Kate and Anne up when Kate caught the two in bed, saying she supposes Adam leaving her makes her and Kate "even". She also tells Adam not to call her when Kate inevitably breaks his heart again.

Kate tries to settle into the rekindled relationship with Adam, but after realizing that she is more attracted to women, she breaks up with him again. However, instead of diving into another relationship, Kate has decided to stay single for now and try to get to know herself. Nina turns up pregnant, but does not know if the baby is Kevin's or Adam's because she slept with both of them in the same night. Kevin still professes his love for Nina, but she is still suspect of his true feelings. Adam finds out she is pregnant, but with the three of them not knowing whose child it is, everything is put on hold. Adam finally goes to Nina's place to have it out with her over who is the father of her baby. He finds Nina and Kevin there together, telling Adam that they have decided to get married. Adam is angry but acquiesces, seeing that Kevin really loves Nina. Nina tells both of them she does not want to know who the biological father of her child is and tells Adam that she and Kevin are going to raise the child. Rebecca, hearing about everything that happened from Kevin, and knowing that Adam would not call her, goes to see him, and the two resume their relationship.

== Cast ==
- Jon Bon Jovi as Kevin
- Josh Charles as Adam
- Joanna Going as Kate
- Penelope Ann Miller as Rebecca
- Annabella Sciorra as Nina
- JoBeth Williams as Anne

== Release ==
The film premiered at the LA Film Festival on April 4, 1997, where it was purchased by Miramax for a reported $2.8 million.

== Reception ==
In his 1997 review for Variety, critic Emanuel Levy wrote, "This love poem to San Francisco and its singles scene recalls Woody Allen’s cinematic infatuation with Manhattan, in a movie that attempts to integrate the city’s distinctive landscape and spirit into its episodic narrative. In execution and structure, however, Little City is more in the vein of Cameron Crowe’s Seattle-set Singles, a seriocomic view of life, love and relationships within a clique of disparate but interconnected characters."

Levy praised the script, which he said "offers some sharp lines about San Francisco as a close-knit, often claustrophobic community, such as Adam’s observation that 'people who are smart and ambitious move to New York, people who are just smart move to San Francisco, and people who are just ambitious go to Los Angeles.'" He added, "While the entire felicitous cast rises to the occasion, and Bon Jovi and Charles endow their roles with charm, ultimately the film belongs to the women." However, Levy said the film is dragged down by "Benabib’s penchant for asides, voiceover narration and confessions, formal devices that does not add much to the proceedings and unnecessarily disrupt the flow of the narrative."

Nathan Rabin of The A.V. Club wrote, "Little City is not a bad movie, exactly, and it does feature plenty of lovely San Francisco scenery, but it does not have anything to say that has not already been said in countless other films about aimless twentysomethings living and loving somewhere on the West Coast."

== Home media and rights ==
Buena Vista Home Entertainment (under the Miramax Home Entertainment banner) released the film on VHS on January 19, 1999 with a DVD following on January 23, 2001.

In December 2010, Miramax was sold by The Walt Disney Company, their owners since 1993. That same month, the studio was taken over by private equity firm Filmyard Holdings. In 2011, Filmyard Holdings licensed the Miramax library to streamer Netflix. This streaming deal included Little City, and ran for five years, eventually ending on June 1, 2016.

Filmyard Holdings sold Miramax to Qatari company beIN Media Group in March 2016. In April 2020, ViacomCBS (now known as Paramount Skydance) acquired the rights to Miramax's library, after buying a 49% stake in the studio from beIN. Little City is among the 700 titles they acquired in the deal, and since April 2020, the film has been distributed by Paramount Pictures.
