= The Brink (TV series) =

2015 American comedy television series

- Promotional poster
- Genre: Political satire
- Created by: Roberto Benabib; Kim Benabib
- Starring: Jack Black; Tim Robbins; Pablo Schreiber; Aasif Mandvi; Maribeth Monroe; Eric Ladin; Geoff Pierson; Esai Morales
- Composer: David Robbins
- Country of origin: United States
- Original language: English
- No. of seasons: 1
- No. of episodes: 10

Production
- Executive producers: Roberto Benabib; Jerry Weintraub; Jay Roach
- Producers: Dave Holstein; Jack Black; Tim Robbins
- Camera setup: Single-camera
- Running time: 30 minutes
- Production companies: Jerry Weintraub Productions; Everyman Pictures; Little City Iron Works

Original release
- Network: HBO
- Release: June 21 – August 23, 2015

The Brink is an American comedy television series created by brothers Roberto Benabib and Kim Benabib. It focuses on a geopolitical crisis in Pakistan. Before cancellation, the show was conceived so that each season would follow a different crisis somewhere in the world involving the same main characters. The pilot episode was written by the Benabib brothers and directed by Jay Roach.

The series premiered on June 21, 2015 on the American cable television network HBO. The Brink was initially renewed for a second season while the first season was still airing. HBO later reversed its order and cancelled the series after just one season.

== Cast ==
=== Main ===
- Jack Black as Alex Talbot, a lowly Foreign Service Officer assigned to the Embassy of the United States, Islamabad
- Tim Robbins as United States Secretary of State Walter Larson
- Pablo Schreiber as Lieutenant Commander Zeke "Z-Pak" Tilson, a drug-dealing United States Naval Aviator on the Gerald R. Ford-class aircraft carrier USS Ulysses S. Grant
- Aasif Mandvi as Rafiq Massoud, a Pakistani employed by the U.S. Embassy.
- Maribeth Monroe as Kendra Peterson, Walter's assistant
- Eric Ladin as Lieutenant Glenn "Jammer" Taylor, Zeke's backseater
- Geoff Pierson as United States Secretary of Defense Pierce Gray
- Esai Morales as President of the United States Julian Navarro

=== Recurring ===
- Mimi Kennedy as CIA Director Susan Buckley
- Jaimie Alexander as Lieutenant Gail Sweet, a public affairs officer on the Grant whom Zeke has impregnated
- Melanie Chandra as Fareeda Massoud, Rafiq's younger sister
- Mary Faber as Ashley, Zeke's pharmacist ex-wife and drug supplier
- Meera Syal as Naeema, Rafiq's mother
- Joey Martin as Captain Stephens
- Carla Gugino as Joanne Larson, Walter's wife, United States Department of Defense general counsel and aspiring federal judge
- John Larroquette as Robert Kittredge, the evangelical United States Ambassador to Pakistan
- Rex Linn as Rear Admiral (upper half) McBride, commander of the Grant carrier battle group
- Iqbal Theba as General Umair Zaman, a Pakistani general who stages a military coup
- Rob Brydon as Martin
- Michelle Gomez as Vanessa
- Bernard White as General Haroon Raja, Director General of Inter-Services Intelligence and Umair's half brother
- Iris Bahr as Israeli Foreign Minister Talia Levy

== Episodes ==
No.	Title	Directed by	Written by	Original release date	US viewers (millions)
1	"Pilot"	Jay Roach	Roberto Benabib & Kim Benabib	June 21, 2015	1.60
2	"Half-Cocked"	Tim Robbins	Roberto Benabib & Kim Benabib	June 28, 2015	1.26
3	"Baghdad My Ass"	Jon Poll	Roberto Benabib & Kim Benabib	July 5, 2015	1.17
4	"I'll Never Be Batman"	Michael Lehmann	Dave Holstein	July 12, 2015	0.99
5	"Swim, Shmuley, Swim"	J. Michael Muro	Jack Kukoda	July 19, 2015	1.06
6	"Tweet Tweet Tweet"	Michael Lehmann	Sam Forman	July 26, 2015	0.97
7	"Sticky Wicket"	Scott Winant	Aasif Mandvi	August 2, 2015	1.00
8	"Who's Grover Cleveland?"	Michael Lehmann	Wes Jones	August 9, 2015	0.89
9	"Just a Little Crazy Talk"	Adam Bernstein	Roberto Benabib, Kim Benabib & Dave Holstein	August 16, 2015	0.94
10	"There Will Be Consequences"	Michael Lehmann	Roberto Benabib, Kim Benabib & Dave Holstein	August 23, 2015	0.87

== Reception ==
The Brink received mixed reviews from critics. Rotten Tomatoes gave the first season a rating of 53%, based on 36 reviews, with an average rating of 5.7/10. The site's critical consensus reads, "The Brink avoids disaster thanks to the game efforts of a talented cast, but they - and viewers - deserve political satire with a sharper bite." Metacritic gives the first season a score of 52 out of 100, based on reviews from 30 critics, indicating "mixed or average reviews".

IGN reviewer Amber Dowling gave the entire first season an 8.0 out of 10 'Great' score, saying that "after a rough first couple of episodes the actors settled into their characters and viewers grew more comfortable with the tone. Quick and surprising plot twists coupled with strong on-screen pairings eventually resulted in a fun summer romp with plenty of potential."

== International broadcast ==
In India, the series aired within 24 hours of the US premiere on June 22, 2015, on HBO Defined HD. In Australia, the series premiered on July 7, 2015, on Showcase. In Saudi Arabia and the rest of the Middle East and North Africa, the series premiered on November 11, 2015, on Orbit Showtime Network (OSN).
