= Roberto Benabib =

Mexician-American writer and director

- Born: Roberto Jack Benabib; October 13, 1959 (age 66); Mexico City, Mexico
- Occupations: Film director Television writer Television producer
- Spouse(s): Amy Spindler (m. 1998; div. 2004) Samantha Gregory (m. 2007)
- Writing career
- Notable works: Little City; Weeds

Roberto Jack Benabib (born October 13, 1959) is a Mexican-American television writer, producer and film director best known for writing/directing the 1997 comedy film Little City. He served as a writer/producer on the Showtime dark comedy series Weeds beginning in 2005.

== Career ==
Roberto Jack Benabib was born in Mexico City in 1959 to Elyssa and Elias Benabib, an antique-prints dealer. Benabib later graduated from New York University film school. Benabib got his start as an assistant to The Silence of the Lambs director Jonathan Demme. In 1997, he wrote and directed Little City, a romantic comedy film, for Miramax Films. In 2005, he joined the writing staff of Weeds as a co-executive producer and, in 2007, at the beginning of the third season was promoted to executive producer.

He has also served as a writer on a number of other television series, including Doctor Doctor, Herman's Head, Ally McBeal and Tilt.

Episodes of Weeds

- "Good Shit Lollipop" (1.3)
- "Last Tango in Agrestic" (2.3)
- "Yeah. Like Tomatoes." (2.11) (with Matthew Salsberg)
- "The Brick Dance" (3.3)
- "Shit Highway" (3.4)
- "Risk" (3.13) (with Rolin Jones & Matthew Salsberg)
- "Protection" (3.14)
- "The Three Coolers" (4.4)
- "Head Cheese" (4.11) (with Rolin Jones & Matthew Salsberg)
- "Till We Meet Again" (4.12) (with Rolin Jones & Matthew Salsberg)
- "Su-Su-Sucio" (5.3) (with Matthew Salsberg)
- "Where the Sidewalk Ends" (5.7) (with Matthew Salsberg)
- "Dearborn-Again" (6.10) (with Matthew Salsberg)
- "Une Mère que j'aimerais baiser" (7.11) (with Matthew Salsberg)

The Brink

In February 2014, Deadline Hollywood reported that HBO had given a greenlight to the dark comedy series The Brink, co-created by Benabib and his brother, novelist Kim Benabib. The series co-stars Tim Robbins and Jack Black, is produced by Jerry Weintraub, and directed by Jay Roach. It premiered on HBO in June 2015. The series was cancelled after one season.

Episodes of Kidding

- "Philliam" (1.08)
- "I'm Listening" (2.03)

Episodes of 68 Whiskey

1. "Buckley's Goat"
2. "Finger Lickin' Good"
3. "Daddy Issues"

== Awards and nominations ==
In 2009, Benabib received a nomination for a Primetime Emmy Award when Weeds was up for the Primetime Emmy Award for Outstanding Comedy Series. He and the show lost out to the NBC sitcom 30 Rock.

== Personal life ==
Benabib was married to the fashion journalist Amy Spindler from July 11, 1998, until her death from a brain tumor on February 27, 2004. Benabib married Samantha Gregory in October 2007.
