= Golden Globe Award for Best Television Series – Musical or Comedy =

Television award

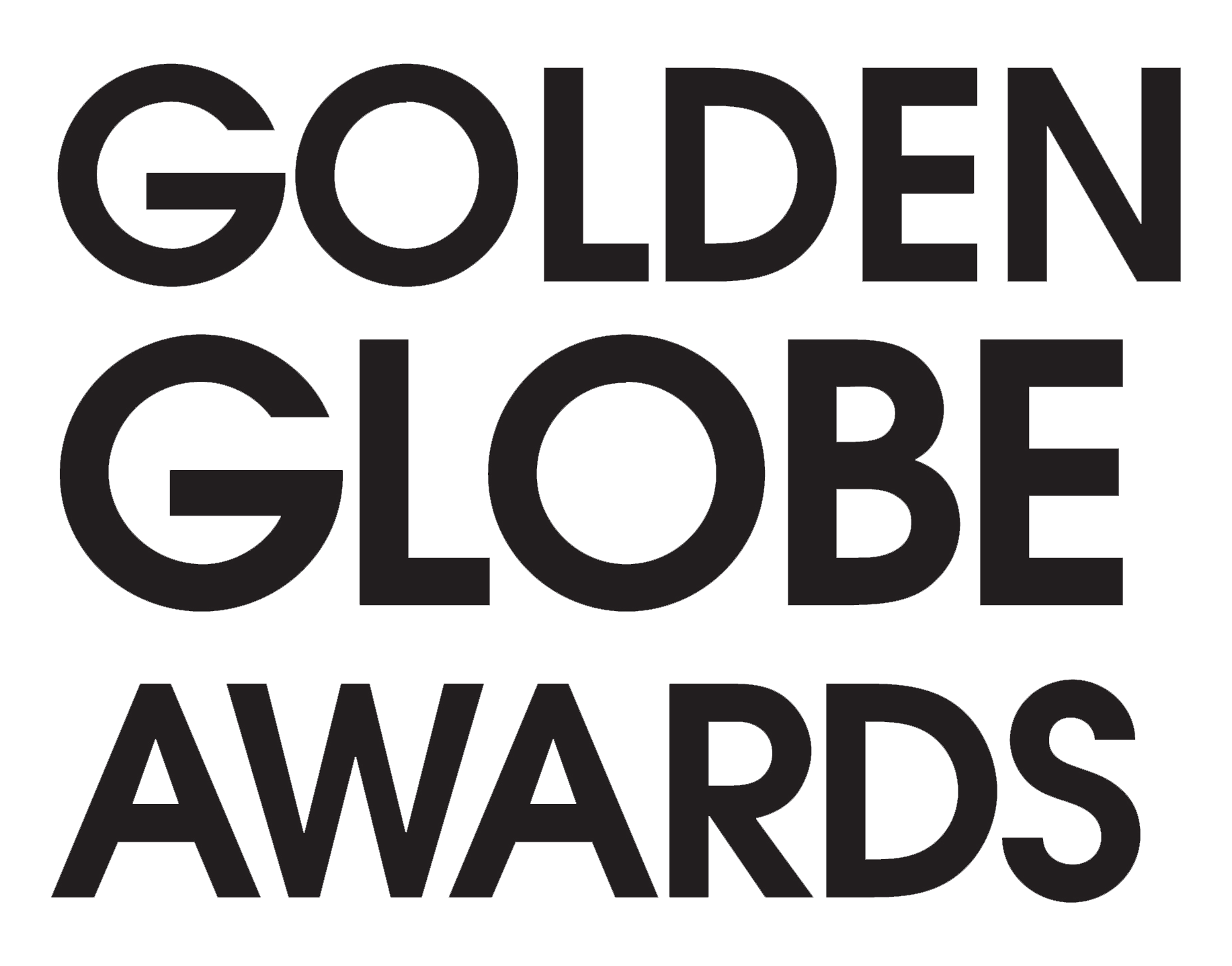
Golden Globe Awards logo

The Golden Globe Award for Best Television Series – Musical or Comedy is one of the annual Golden Globe Awards, given to the best comedy television series. From 1962 to 1968, the category was Golden Globe Award for Best Television Series, and grouped musical, comedy and drama series in a single category. After 1968, drama series were given their own category, the Golden Globe Award for Best Television Series – Drama.

== 1960s ==
Year	Program	Network
Best Television Series
1961	My Three Sons	ABC
1961	What's My Line?	CBS
1962	Best Television Program	
1962	The Dick Powell Show	NBC
1962	Best Television Series - Comedy	
1962	Mister Ed	CBS
1963	Best Television Series - Comedy	
1963	The Dick Van Dyke Show	CBS
1963	The Beverly Hillbillies	CBS
1963	The Bob Hope Show	NBC
1963	The Jack Benny Program	CBS
1963	The Red Skelton Hour	CBS
1963	Best Television Series - Variety	
1963	The Danny Kaye Show	CBS
1963	The Andy Williams Show	NBC
1963	The Garry Moore Show	CBS
1963	The Judy Garland Show	CBS
1963	The Tonight Show Starring Johnny Carson	NBC
Best Television Series
1964	The Rogues	NBC
1964	12 O'Clock High	ABC
1964	The Munsters	CBS
1964	The Red Skelton Hour	CBS
1964	Wendy and Me	ABC
Best Television Program
1965	The Man from U.N.C.L.E.	NBC
1965	Frank Sinatra: A Man and His Music	NBC
1965	Get Smart	NBC
1965	I Spy	NBC
1965	My Name Is Barbra	CBS
Best Television Series
1966	I Spy	NBC
1966	The Fugitive	ABC
1966	The Man from U.N.C.L.E.	NBC
1966	Run For Your Life	NBC
1966	That Girl	ABC
1967	Mission: Impossible	CBS
1967	The Carol Burnett Show	CBS
1967	The Dean Martin Show	NBC
1967	Garrison's Gorillas	ABC
1967	Rowan & Martin's Laugh-In	NBC
1968	Rowan & Martin's Laugh-In	NBC
1968	The Carol Burnett Show	CBS
1968	The Doris Day Show	CBS
1968	Julia	NBC
1968	The Name of the Game	NBC
Best Musical/Comedy Series
1969	The Carol Burnett Show	CBS
1969	The Glen Campbell Goodtime Hour	CBS
1969	The Governor & J.J.	CBS
1969	Love, American Style	ABC
1969	Rowan & Martin's Laugh-In	NBC

== 1970s ==
Year	Program	Network
1970	The Carol Burnett Show	CBS
1970	The Courtship of Eddie's Father	ABC
1970	Family Affair	CBS
1970	The Glen Campbell Goodtime Hour	CBS
1970	The Partridge Family	ABC
1971	All in the Family	CBS
1971	The Carol Burnett Show	CBS
1971	The Flip Wilson Show	NBC
1971	The Mary Tyler Moore Show	CBS
1971	The Partridge Family	ABC
1972	All in the Family	CBS
1972	M*A*S*H	CBS
1972	The Mary Tyler Moore Show	CBS
1972	Maude	CBS
1972	The Sonny & Cher Comedy Hour	CBS
1973	All in the Family	CBS
1973	The Carol Burnett Show	CBS
1973	The Mary Tyler Moore Show	CBS
1973	Sanford and Son	NBC
1973	The Sonny & Cher Comedy Hour	CBS
1974	Rhoda	CBS
1974	All in the Family	CBS
1974	The Carol Burnett Show	CBS
1974	The Mary Tyler Moore Show	CBS
1974	Maude	CBS
1975	Barney Miller	ABC
1975	All in the Family	CBS
1975	The Carol Burnett Show	CBS
1975	Chico and the Man	NBC
1975	The Mary Tyler Moore Show	CBS
1976	Barney Miller	ABC
1976	The Carol Burnett Show	CBS
1976	Donny & Marie	ABC
1976	Happy Days	ABC
1976	Laverne & Shirley	ABC
1976	M*A*S*H	CBS
1977	All in the Family	CBS
1977	Barney Miller	ABC
1977	The Carol Burnett Show	CBS
1977	Happy Days	ABC
1977	Laverne & Shirley	ABC
1978	Taxi	ABC
1978	Alice	CBS
1978	All in the Family	CBS
1978	The Love Boat	ABC
1978	Three's Company	ABC
1979	Alice	CBS
1979	Taxi	ABC
1979	The Associates	ABC
1979	The Love Boat	ABC
1979	M*A*S*H	CBS

== 1980s ==
Year	Program	Network
1980	Taxi	ABC
1980	Alice	CBS
1980	The Love Boat	ABC
1980	M*A*S*H	CBS
1980	Soap	ABC
1981	M*A*S*H	CBS
1981	Barbara Mandrell and the Mandrell Sisters	NBC
1981	The Love Boat	ABC
1981	Private Benjamin	CBS
1981	Taxi	ABC
1982	Fame	NBC
1982	Cheers	NBC
1982	Love, Sidney	NBC
1982	M*A*S*H	CBS
1982	Taxi	ABC; NBC
1983	Fame	Syndicated
1983	Buffalo Bill	NBC
1983	Cheers	NBC
1983	Newhart	CBS
1983	Taxi	NBC
1984	The Cosby Show	NBC
1984	Cheers	NBC
1984	Fame	Syndicated
1984	The Jeffersons	CBS
1984	Kate & Allie	CBS
1985	The Golden Girls	NBC
1985	The Cosby Show	NBC
1985	Family Ties	NBC
1985	Kate & Allie	CBS
1985	Moonlighting	ABC
1986	The Golden Girls	NBC
1986	Cheers	NBC
1986	The Cosby Show	NBC
1986	Family Ties	NBC
1986	Moonlighting	ABC
1987	The Golden Girls	NBC
1987	Cheers	NBC
1987	Family Ties	NBC
1987	Frank's Place	CBS
1987	Hooperman	ABC
1987	Moonlighting	ABC
1988	The Wonder Years	ABC
1988	Cheers	NBC
1988	The Golden Girls	NBC
1988	Murphy Brown	CBS
1988	Roseanne	ABC
1989	Murphy Brown	CBS
1989	Cheers	NBC
1989	Designing Women	CBS
1989	Empty Nest	NBC
1989	The Golden Girls	NBC
1989	The Wonder Years	ABC

== 1990s ==
Year	Program	Network
1990	Cheers	NBC
1990	Designing Women	CBS
1990	The Golden Girls	NBC
1990	Married... with Children	Fox
1990	Murphy Brown	CBS
1991	Brooklyn Bridge	CBS
1991	Cheers	NBC
1991	Evening Shade	CBS
1991	The Golden Girls	NBC
1991	Murphy Brown	CBS
1992	Roseanne	ABC
1992	Brooklyn Bridge	CBS
1992	Cheers	NBC
1992	Evening Shade	CBS
1992	Murphy Brown	CBS
1993	Seinfeld	NBC
1993	Coach	ABC
1993	Frasier	NBC
1993	Home Improvement	ABC
1993	Roseanne	ABC
1994	Mad About You	NBC
1994	Frasier	NBC
1994	Grace Under Fire	ABC
1994	Home Improvement	ABC
1994	Seinfeld	NBC
1995	Cybill	CBS
1995	Frasier	NBC
1995	Friends	NBC
1995	Mad About You	NBC
1995	Seinfeld	NBC
1996	3rd Rock from the Sun	NBC
1996	Frasier	NBC
1996	Friends	NBC
1996	The Larry Sanders Show	HBO
1996	Mad About You	NBC
1996	Seinfeld	NBC
1997	Ally McBeal	Fox
1997	3rd Rock from the Sun	NBC
1997	Frasier	NBC
1997	Friends	NBC
1997	Seinfeld	NBC
1997	Spin City	ABC
1998	Ally McBeal	Fox
1998	Dharma & Greg	ABC
1998	Frasier	NBC
1998	Just Shoot Me!	NBC
1998	Spin City	ABC
1999	Sex and the City	HBO
1999	Ally McBeal	Fox
1999	Dharma & Greg	ABC
1999	Spin City	ABC
1999	Will & Grace	NBC

== 2000s ==
Year	Program	Network
2000	Sex and the City	HBO
2000	Ally McBeal	Fox
2000	Frasier	NBC
2000	Malcolm in the Middle	Fox
2000	Will & Grace	NBC
2001	Sex and the City	HBO
2001	Ally McBeal	Fox
2001	Frasier	NBC
2001	Friends	NBC
2001	Will & Grace	NBC
2002	Curb Your Enthusiasm	HBO
2002	Friends	NBC
2002	Sex and the City	HBO
2002	The Simpsons	Fox
2002	Will & Grace	NBC
2003	The Office	BBC America
2003	Arrested Development	Fox
2003	Monk	USA
2003	Sex and the City	HBO
2003	Will & Grace	NBC
2004	Desperate Housewives	ABC
2004	Arrested Development	Fox
2004	Entourage	HBO
2004	Sex and the City	HBO
2004	Will & Grace	NBC
2005	Desperate Housewives	ABC
2005	Curb Your Enthusiasm	HBO
2005	Entourage	HBO
2005	Everybody Hates Chris	UPN
2005	My Name Is Earl	NBC
2005	Weeds	Showtime
2006	Ugly Betty	ABC
2006	Desperate Housewives	ABC
2006	Entourage	HBO
2006	The Office	NBC
2006	Weeds	Showtime
2007	Extras	HBO
2007	30 Rock	NBC
2007	Californication	Showtime
2007	Entourage	HBO
2007	Pushing Daisies	ABC
2008	30 Rock	NBC
2008	Californication	Showtime
2008	Entourage	HBO
2008	The Office	NBC
2008	Weeds	Showtime
2009	Glee	Fox
2009	30 Rock	NBC
2009	Entourage	HBO
2009	Modern Family	ABC
2009	The Office	NBC

== 2010s ==
Year	Program	Network
2010	Glee	Fox
2010	30 Rock	NBC
2010	The Big Bang Theory	CBS
2010	The Big C	Showtime
2010	Modern Family	ABC
2010	Nurse Jackie	Showtime
2011	Modern Family	ABC
2011	Enlightened	HBO
2011	Episodes	Showtime
2011	Glee	Fox
2011	New Girl	Fox
2012	Girls	HBO
2012	The Big Bang Theory	CBS
2012	Episodes	Showtime
2012	Modern Family	ABC
2012	Smash	NBC
2013	Brooklyn Nine-Nine	Fox
2013	The Big Bang Theory	CBS
2013	Girls	HBO
2013	Modern Family	ABC
2013	Parks and Recreation	NBC
2014	Transparent	Amazon Prime Video
2014	Girls	HBO
2014	Jane the Virgin	The CW
2014	Orange Is the New Black	Netflix
2014	Silicon Valley	HBO
2015	Mozart in the Jungle	Amazon Prime Video
2015	Casual	Hulu
2015	Orange Is the New Black	Netflix
2015	Silicon Valley	HBO
2015	Transparent	Amazon Prime Video
2015	Veep	HBO
2016	Atlanta	FX
2016	Black-ish	ABC
2016	Mozart in the Jungle	Amazon Prime Video
2016	Transparent	Amazon Prime Video
2016	Veep	HBO
2017	The Marvelous Mrs. Maisel	Amazon Prime Video
2017	Black-ish	ABC
2017	Master of None	Netflix
2017	SMILF	Showtime
2017	Will & Grace	NBC
2018	The Kominsky Method	Netflix
2018	Barry	HBO
2018	The Good Place	NBC
2018	Kidding	Showtime
2018	The Marvelous Mrs. Maisel	Amazon Prime Video
2019	Fleabag	Amazon Prime Video
2019	Barry	HBO
2019	The Kominsky Method	Netflix
2019	The Marvelous Mrs. Maisel	Amazon Prime Video
2019	The Politician	Netflix

== 2020s ==
Year	Program	Network
2020	Schitt's Creek	Pop
2020	Emily in Paris	Netflix
2020	The Flight Attendant	HBO Max
2020	The Great	Hulu
2020	Ted Lasso	Apple TV+
2021	Hacks	HBO Max
2021	The Great	Hulu
2021	Only Murders in the Building	Hulu
2021	Reservation Dogs	FX on Hulu
2021	Ted Lasso	Apple TV+
2022	Abbott Elementary	ABC
2022	The Bear	FX
2022	Hacks	HBO Max
2022	Only Murders in the Building	Hulu
2022	Wednesday	Netflix
2023	The Bear	FX
2023	Abbott Elementary	ABC
2023	Barry	HBO
2023	Jury Duty	Amazon Freevee
2023	Only Murders in the Building	Hulu
2023	Ted Lasso	Apple TV+
2024	Hacks	Max
2024	Abbott Elementary	ABC
2024	The Bear	FX
2024	The Gentlemen	Netflix
2024	Nobody Wants This	Netflix
2024	Only Murders in the Building	Hulu
2025	The Studio	Apple TV
2025	Abbott Elementary	ABC
2025	The Bear	FX
2025	Hacks	HBO Max
2025	Nobody Wants This	Netflix
2025	Only Murders in the Building	Hulu

== Series with multiple wins ==
4 wins

- All in the Family

3 wins

- The Golden Girls
- Sex and the City
- Taxi

2 wins

- Ally McBeal
- Barney Miller
- The Carol Burnett Show
- Desperate Housewives
- Fame
- Glee
- Hacks

== Series with multiple nominations ==
10 nominations

- The Carol Burnett Show
- Cheers

8 nominations

- Frasier

7 nominations

- All in the Family
- The Golden Girls
- Will & Grace

6 nominations

- Entourage
- M*A*S*H
- Sex and the City
- Taxi

5 nominations

- Ally McBeal
- Friends
- The Mary Tyler Moore Show
- Modern Family
- Murphy Brown
- Only Murders in the Building
- Seinfeld

4 nominations

- 30 Rock
- Abbott Elementary
- The Bear
- Hacks
- The Love Boat

3 nominations

- Alice
- Barney Miller
- Barry
- The Big Bang Theory
- The Cosby Show
- Desperate Housewives
- Fame
- Family Ties
- Girls
- Glee
- Mad About You
- The Marvelous Mrs. Maisel
- Moonlighting
- The Office
- Roseanne
- Rowan & Martin's Laugh-In
- Spin City
- Ted Lasso
- Transparent
- Weeds

2 nominations

- 3rd Rock from the Sun
- Arrested Development
- Black-ish
- Brooklyn Bridge
- Californication
- Curb Your Enthusiasm
- Designing Women
- Dharma & Greg
- Episodes
- Evening Shade
- The Glen Campbell Goodtime Hour
- The Great
- Happy Days
- Home Improvement
- Kate & Allie
- The Kominsky Method
- Laverne & Shirley
- Maude
- Mozart in the Jungle
- Nobody Wants This
- Orange Is the New Black
- The Partridge Family
- Silicon Valley
- The Sonny & Cher Comedy Hour
- Veep
- The Wonder Years

== Total awards by network ==
- NBC – 17
- CBS – 13
- ABC – 11
- HBO/HBO Max – 8
- Fox – 5
- Amazon Prime Video – 4
- FX – 2
- Apple TV – 1
- BBC – 1
- Netflix – 1
- Pop TV – 1
- Syndicated – 1

== See also ==
- Primetime Emmy Award for Outstanding Comedy Series
- Screen Actors Guild Award for Outstanding Performance by an Ensemble in a Comedy Series
- Critics' Choice Television Award for Best Comedy Series
