= Backstage (publication) =

Entertainment industry publication

- June 2025 cover
- Editor-in-chief: Briana Rodriguez
- Frequency: Weekly
- Founded: 1960
- Company: Cast & Crew
- Country: United States
- Based in: New York City and Los Angeles
- Language: English
- Website: www.backstage.com
- ISSN: 0005-3635

Backstage, also previously written as Back Stage, is an American entertainment industry trade publication. Founded by Allen Zwerdling and Ira Eaker in 1960, it covers the film and performing arts industry from the perspective of performers, unions, and casting, with an emphasis on topics such as job opportunities and career advice. The brand encompasses Backstage.com—which features editorial content and a job listings platform for casting calls, Backstage magazine, and Call Sheet (formerly Ross Reports)—a bi-monthly directory of talent agents, casting directors, and casting calls.

The publication was founded in, and originally focused primarily on New York City and the U.S. east coast. In the 1990s, Back Stage established the Los Angeles–based Back Stage West, which competed primarily with the longer-established Drama-Logue; in 1998, Drama-Logue was acquired by Back Stage and merged into Back Stage West. In 2008, both versions were merged into a single national edition.

From the 1990s through the early 2010s, Backstage was a sister to fellow entertainment publications Billboard and The Hollywood Reporter, and later Adweek, via Billboard Publications and its corporate successors, such as Nielsen Business Media and Prometheus Global Media. In 2011, Back Stage was divested by Prometheus to a group led by John Amato, who relaunched the print and digital publications. After being briefly being re-acquired by Prometheus, it was sold to RZ Capital in 2013, and in turn sold to payroll company Cast & Crew in 2022.

== History ==
Backstage (the company) was founded by Allen Zwerdling and Ira Eaker in New York City in December 1960 as a weekly tabloid-sized newspaper called Back Stage. Zwerdling and Eaker had worked together for years as editor and advertising director, respectively, of the Show Business casting newspaper, which was founded by Leo Shull as Actor's Cues in 1941. After Zwerdling and Eaker left Show Business they looked into creating a casting section within The Village Voice newspaper; but, having been turned down, they decided to launch Backstage on their own.

At the time of its founding, Backstage (the newsmagazine) was primarily a casting paper for New York actors intended to compete with Show Business Weekly. It gradually broadened its scope to include coverage of New York's television commercial production industry and a variety of performing arts, the former of which proved to be so lucrative advertising-wise that the commercial-production beat came to dominate the publication. Additionally, Backstage's reach began to slowly spread across the U.S., although the largest portion of its readership remained on the East Coast.

Then, in 1975, Backstage opened a Los Angeles bureau and began to more actively extend its casting and editorial coverage across the U.S., with correspondents added in Chicago, Florida, and New England. Around 1977, co-founder Ira Eaker's daughter Sherry joined Backstage as an editor, focusing primarily on expanding its coverage of the theater industry; in 1984, the theater section of Backstage became a separate insert.

In 1986, Backstage was bought by Billboard Publications Inc. (BPI), owner of such publications as Billboard. In 1988, BPI bought The Hollywood Reporter. Backstage and The Hollywood Reporter along with a few other related brands, were grouped together within BPI, becoming its film and performing arts division, a group designed to compete with Variety and other entertainment-industry trade publications. Backstage would become involved in a number of other acquisitions, mergers, spin-offs, and sales over the next few decades.

On July 6, 1990, Backstage's advertising industry content was spun off as a standalone trade publication known as Backstage/Shoot, leaving Backstage itself to focus on the creative arts. Around the same time, it also acquired the New York-based talent casting directory Ross Reports. In early 1994, Netherlands-based company VNU bought Backstage owner BPI. VNU eventually came to own a variety of trade publications—including all of the BPI magazines as well as Mediaweek, Adweek, Film Journal International, The Hollywood Creative Directory, and many others—along with measurement company Nielsen Media Research, and events such as ShoWest and the Clio Awards.

Also in early 1994, Back Stage publisher Steve Elish hired a West Coast editor-in-chief, Rob Kendt, to help create a new publication, Back Stage West, a weekly trade paper with a focus on the West Coast acting community and casting opportunities based in California. In May 1998, Back Stage acquired its main local competitor, Drama-Logue; The Drama-Logue company was founded by Bill Bordy in 1969 as a casting hotline, and in 1972 it became a weekly trade publication entitled The Hollywood Drama-Logue Casting Sheet, commonly known simply as Drama-Logue. Before the end of 1998, Drama-Logue's holdings were fully integrated into Backstage.com and Back Stage West, which for a time was co-branded as Back Stage West/Drama-Logue.

=== Backstage.com ===
Beginning in the late 1990s, a number of casting information and entertainment job websites began cropping up, offering specialized online tools for actors, performers, and models, including online casting submission systems and video-enhanced resumes. Backstage.com, introduced by Publisher Steve Elish, was a leader in taking the casting industry online. Its early products included a paid member's area, which charged $9.95 per month for unlimited access to articles and casting calls across New York, Los Angeles, Chicago, Florida, Las Vegas, and other key entertainment-industry hubs. The monthly fee also entitled subscribers to inclusion in the website's first iteration of a headshot and resume database.

Starting in 2000, writer-editor-filmmaker and web-developer Luke Crowe joined the company, and began working on the development of online casting tools for Backstage. Over the next few years, Backstage.com introduced options for casting directors to self-post breakdowns, a searchable acting-jobs database of casting notices, interactive audition lists, casting coverage in every state in the U.S., and an advanced headshot and resume talent database, among other new options, some of the first online tools ever developed for actors and casting directors. The number of new casting notices listed on Backstage.com each week expanded from the hundreds to the thousands over the next few years, while monthly site traffic increased from the hundreds-of-thousands to the millions.

In addition to encompassing all of the content from Backstage's print publications, the website's scope continued to expand to include more online-exclusive casting notices and original online-only news stories, feature articles, entertainment-industry listings, and reviews. During this time period, several competitors challenged the brand, but it remained the industry leader. However, the competition eventually sparked major changes in Backstage's development, and in October 2005 Backstage relaunched its print and online publications in order to regain its edge.

=== Relaunches and acquisitions ===
During this 2005 relaunch process, all Backstage publications were redesigned (including Backstage West); various staffing changes took place; the East Coast/New York edition of Backstage was renamed Backstage East; Backstage.com began publishing more articles on a daily basis and introduced more exclusive editorial content, blogs, feeds, and tools; and Casting. Backstage.com was founded, giving Backstage.com users access to even more advanced casting/job search, sort, alert, and application tools, along with a more robust talent database featuring resumes, pictures, video reels, and audio reels of thousands of working and aspiring actors and performers.

Around this same time, the primary Backstage tagline changed from "The Performing Arts Weekly" to "The Actor's Resource." A secondary branding slogan, "Casting You Can Trust—Since 1960" was also added and given prominent placement both on Backstage.com and on the front covers of the weekly East Coast and West Coast newspaper/magazine versions of Backstage. And sister publication SHOOT (and ShootOnline.com) was sold to another publishing company.

In 2006, a company called Valcon Acquisition B.V., run by a private equity group consortium, bought VNU, making Valcon the new owner of Backstage and all other VNU holdings. Then, on January 18, 2007, VNU rebranded itself The Nielsen Company, with its trade-publication division being renamed Nielsen Business Media.

In early 2007, VP/Group Publisher Steve Elish retired from Backstage after 34 years. However, co-founder Ira Eaker's daughter, former longtime Backstage editor-in-chief Sherry Eaker, carried on her father's work as Backstage's editor at large, along with editor-at-large David Sheward, who left his executive editor position at Backstage after working for the brand for over 28 years. Former publishers include Steve Elish, Jeff Black, and Charlie Weiss. Former lead editors include Sherry Eaker, Rob Kendt, Jamie Painter Young, Daniel Holloway, Dany Margolies, Tom Penketh, Erik Haagensen, Roger Armbrust, Leonard Jacobs, David Fairhurst, Andrew Salomon, Dan Lehman, dance editor Jennie Schulman (who wrote for Backstage for over 40 continuous years, starting with its first issue on Dec. 2, 1960), film and television editor Jenelle Riley, contributing editor Jackie Apodaca, and actor-columnist Michael Kostroff (known for his work in The Wire), among others.

In October 2008, Backstage East and Backstage West were permanently combined into a single weekly publication with an expanded national focus. This new "national edition" was given the same name as the original 1960 edition: Back Stage.

Backstage also launched a number of blogs around this time, including Blog Stage, Espresso, Backstage Unscripted, and The Backstage 411 Casting FAQ, all of which were discontinued in early 2012.

In early 2009, Ross Reports was renamed Call Sheet by Backstage, working with The Hollywood Creative Directory to expand its listings to include a wider variety of entertainment-industry contacts.

In late 2009, Backstage and other Nielsen Business Media brands were sold to e5 Global Media, which was later renamed Prometheus Global Media, and then renamed Guggenheim Digital Media.

The Backstage brand remained closely tied to its primary sister publications, The Hollywood Reporter and Billboard, as well as the other e5 Global Media publications, such as Adweek, Film Journal International, and The Hollywood Creative Directory. However, Backstage also carved out its own industry niche by focusing on the needs of actors, models, performers, and casting directors; publishing directories (such as Call Sheet, a bimonthly listing of talent agents, casting directors, and film productions), books (actor handbooks and biographies published under the Watson-Guptill imprint Backstage Books), casting-director mailing labels, and special "insert" magazines (such as award-season nomination guides, theatre-school guides, and the ACTION magazine for actors interested in making their own movies); producing live events; and continuing the development of Internet casting technology.

Backstage continued to be a resource for audition information, casting calls/casting notices, training opportunities, and entertainment-industry jobs, news, and interviews. Film and theatre were the main topics reviewed and reported upon, but the television, radio, dance, music, cabaret, voice-over, modeling, commercial advertising, and stand-up comedy industries were also included in Backstage's coverage.

In October 2011, media entrepreneur John Amato led Backstage through a spin-off from Prometheus Global Media as part of a new strategic partnership, with the new company being called Backstage, LLC. Prometheus shareholder Guggenheim Partners backed the sale.

In August 2012, Back Stage was relaunched again, with the magazine switching from a tabloid-sized newspaper to a smaller, full-color glossy magazine (and also being slightly rebranded from Back Stage to Backstage). The magazine added increased cross-promotion for the resources and utilities on the similarly-redesigned Backstage.com. Amato stated readers had requested that the print edition have a smaller form factor to make it easier to take to casting calls, while the redesigned website was meant to "[lead] the user into the products and content that we’ve seen historically be the most helpful for our audience".

In January 2013, Backstage LLC acquired Sonicbids, a service designed to help musicians find gigs, for $15 million. In April 2013, Prometheus Global Media, now fully owned by Guggenheim, bought the remainder of Backstage LLC. John Amato was made president of the Billboard Group, a new unit that would oversee Backstage, Billboard, and Sonicbids. In December 2013, Backstage and Sonicbids were acquired by RZ Capital.

In December 2016, Backstage expanded its online casting tools and editorial coverage to include a wider international scope, with an initial focus on casting in the United Kingdom.

In October 2017, Backstage launched its first fully integrated mobile casting app.

In 2019, Ridgemont Equity Partners invested in Backstage. That year, Backstage revamped its online casting platform, adding profiles, new application options, new notification options, Google Maps integration, as well as new review features for employers.

In February 2021, Backstage acquired StarNow and Mandy Network.

In 2022, Backstage was acquired by Cast & Crew, a Burbank-based payroll management company operating in the entertainment industry.

=== 2017 staff ===
As of 2017, principals at Backstage included vice president and national casting editor Luke Crowe. At that time, Backstage writers and editors included managing casting editor Melinda Loewenstein and supervising casting editor Veronika Daddona, among many others.

== Casting ==
Backstage’s casting department reviews and publishes more than 30,000 casting notices on Backstage.com every year, for projects that range from major studio and network productions and Broadway shows to indie and student films. By monitoring the notices, Backstage is able to quickly work to protect actors from scams, while facilitating the distribution of hundreds of thousands of performance opportunities via a suite of online casting tools.

== Editorial ==
Backstage Magazine features a different actor on its cover every week with original photography, along with entertainment-industry news and advice columns. Previous cover subjects have included Academy Award winners Kevin Spacey, Benicio Del Toro, Jennifer Lawrence, Lupita Nyong’o, and Eddie Redmayne. Backstage.com also features a series of advice columns written by industry insiders called Backstage Experts, offering aspiring and working actors the know-how to find work and improve their craft. There are also features on different acting schools, coaches, and theater companies around the country.

== Events ==
From 1992 to 2012, Backstage produced annual Actorfest trade shows, entertainment-industry networking events held in various cities. Past Actorfest events took place in New York City, Los Angeles, Philadelphia, and Detroit. Other Backstage events in the past included the annual Backstage Garland Awards (previously known as the Drama-Logue Award) honoring the California theatre scene; the annual Bistro Awards honoring the cabaret industry, especially NYC-based cabaret; and the bi-coastal An Evening With ... series that combined film screenings with Q&A sessions featuring key actors and directors from each film being shown.

Additionally, Backstage hosted classes, workshops, and networking events through its Backstage University brand, and sponsors numerous events and panels for talent working in the fields of film, television, commercials, radio/voice-overs, theatre, dance, modeling, and club talent (comedians, singers, etc.). Its "Successful Actor" panel series was done in partnership with the American Academy of Dramatic Arts.
