= Eaker =

Eaker is a surname. Notable people with the surname include:

- Adam Eaker (born 1985), American art historian and curator
- Ira C. Eaker (1896–1987), American general
- Ira Eaker (publisher) (c. 1921–2002), American publisher
- Kara Eaker (born 2002), American artistic gymnast
