= Zwerdling =

Zwerdling is a surname. Notable people with the surname include:

- Allen Zwerdling (1922–2009), American journalist
- Daniel Zwerdling, American journalist

== See also ==
- Zwerling
