= Broadcast Data Systems =

Service that tracks airplay of songs

- Industry: Internet Music Data Analysis
- Founded: 1982; 44 years ago
- Founder: Robert Uhlmann; Hal Oppenheimer
- Defunct: 2022
- Headquarters: Kansas City, Missouri, United States
- Area served: Canada; Mexico; United States (including Puerto Rico)
- Products: Music Connect; BDS Radio; BDS Realtime; ENcore; Musictracking
- Owner: Luminate
- Parent: MRC
- Website: www.bdsradio.com

Broadcast Data Systems (also known as Nielsen BDS, BDS or Luminate BDS) was a service that tracks radio, television and internet airplay of songs. The service, which is a unit of MRC Data, is a contributing factor to North American charts published by co-owned magazine Billboard, including the Billboard Hot 100 and Canadian Hot 100, when combined with sales and streaming data from Soundscan.

BDS monitors airplay on more than 2,000 radio stations, satellite radio, and cable music channels across the United States (including Puerto Rico), Canada, and Mexico. Luminate distributes BDS airplay data in their suite of music data products, including Music Connect, BDSRadio, BDS RealTime, ENcore and Musictracking.

From August 2006 to its final June 2009 publication, BDS also provided chart data for R&R after Nielsen acquired the trade. On September 10, 2009, the website Radio-Info.com struck a partnership with Nielsen BDS to provide radio airplay charts and related data for over 20 formats.

== History ==
BDS was founded as Broadcast Recognition Systems by Robert Uhlmann and Hal Oppenheimer, in 1982. Uhlmann developed the idea for automating airplay recognition after his experience working in the music industry in Florida. After returning to Kansas City, Uhlmann partnered with financier Hal Oppenheimer to start the company and develop the technology for tracking airplay data, which was originally developed to detect submarines by military contractors in Washington D.C.

In 1986, BDS debuted their revolutionary audio recognition technology in front of the Recording Industry Association of America as a new method of monitoring radio airplay of songs and commercial advertising. Prior to the debut of their tracking system the music industry relied on self-reported playlists from radio stations.

BDS airplay data was first used on a Billboard chart on January 20, 1990, when Billboard magazine published their newly revised Hot Country Singles chart. On November 30, 1991, Billboard published the first Billboard Hot 100 chart using airplay data from BDS. Since its debut, BDS has become the standard for the radio and music industry because of its accuracy of detecting, tracking and monitoring songs, thus eliminating the use of reporting and call-outs to trades and record labels when it comes to adding and testing tracks. The method has also helped tracks that only received airplay (songs that are not released as singles) become major hits, especially in Billboard's Hot 100 chart, where several radio-only tracks have reached the top spot.

In 1994, SESAC became the first Performance Rights Organization to use data from BDS.

BDS was acquired by Billboard parent company BPI Communications. In 1994, BPI Communications along with BDS were sold to Dutch media conglomerate Verenigde Nederlandse Uitgeverijen (VNU). After VNU was reorganized and renamed the Nielsen Company in 2007, BDS became known as Nielsen BDS.

In December 2019, Valence Media, the parent company of Billboard, acquired Nielsen's music data business to establish its data division, MRC Data. The acquisition reunited BDS with Billboard for the first time since its spin-off to E5 Global Media from Nielsen Business Media. The purchase included Soundscan, BDS, and Music360. In October 2020, MRC and Penske Media combined their data businesses to form a joint venture, named P-MRC Data. The joint venture would combine MRC Data, Alpha Data, and Variety Business Intelligence. P-MRC Data rebranded as Luminate in March 2022.

The service was retired in September 2022. As a replacement, Luminate partnered with Mediabase for tracking radio airplay data.

== BDS Certified Spin Awards ==
BDS Certified Spin Awards were given to songs that reached more than 50,000 and 100,000 radio spins tracked by Nielsen BDS. These awards were published by Billboard on a monthly basis.
