= Shoot (advertising magazine) =

American trade publication

SHOOT
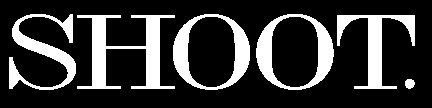
- Categories: Trade magazine
- Frequency: print: bimonthly Website: 24/7/365 ePubs: Daily & Weekly
- Publisher: DCA Business Media LLC
- First issue: 1990; 36 years ago
- Country: United States
- Based in: Westport, Connecticut
- Language: English
- Website: www.shootonline.com
- ISSN: 1055-9825 (print); 1074-5297 (web)

Shoot (stylized SHOOT) is a trade magazine for the advertising industry that was established in 1990 as Back Stage/Shoot, providing news and information about advertising agencies, executives, and creative advertising professionals.

== History ==
The magazine was established in December 1960 under the title Back Stage, in a newspaper format covering theatre and commercial production. The owners were Ira Eaker and Allen Zwerdling. In 1986, Eaker and Zwerdling sold Back Stage to Billboard Publications. In July 1990, BPI Communications split Back Stage into two separate weekly publications: Back Stage/Shoot, which focused on film and video production, and Backstage, which continued covering the performing arts. The latter adopted the subtitle "The Performing Arts Weekly", while the commercial-production publication was later shortened to Shoot. In October 2005, BackStage redesigned its print and online publications. Shoot was published by DCA Business Media LLC.
