= Show business =

Vernacular term for the entertainment industry

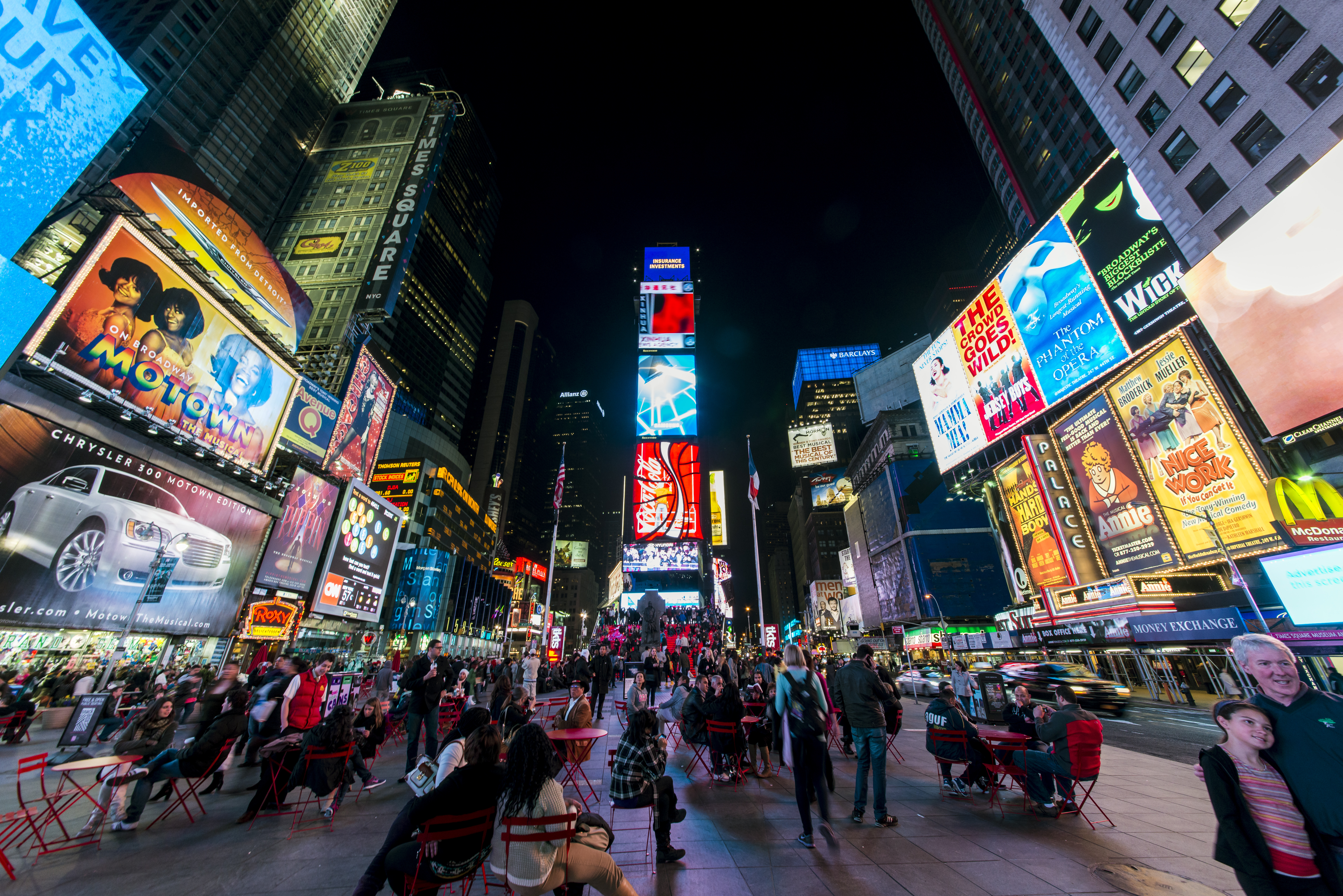
Times Square in New York City, the hub of the Broadway theater district, "the Center of the Entertainment Universe", and one of the world's busiest pedestrian intersections

Show business, sometimes shortened to show biz or showbiz (since c. 1945), is a vernacular term for all aspects of the entertainment industry. From the business side (including managers, agents, producers, and distributors), the term applies to the creative element (including artists, performers, writers, musicians, and technicians) and was in common usage throughout the 20th century, though the first known use in print dates from 1850. At that time and for several decades, it typically included the initial definite article the. By the latter part of the century, it had acquired a slightly arcane quality associated with the era of variety, but the term was still in active use. In modern entertainment industry, it is also associated with the fashion industry (creating trend and fashion) and acquiring intellectual property rights from the invested research in the entertainment business.

== Industry ==
The global media and entertainment (M&E) market, including film, television shows and advertising, streaming media, music, broadcasting, radio, book publishing, video games, and ancillary services and products was worth US$1.72 trillion in 2015, $1.9 trillion in 2016, and estimated at $2.14 trillion in 2020. About one third of the total ($735 billion in 2017) is made up by the U.S. entertainment industry, the largest M&E market in the world.

=== Sectors and companies ===
The entertainment sector can be split up into the following subsectors:

- Amusement parks
- Animation
- Broadcasting
- Circus
- Event management
- Film
- Gambling
- Game manufacturers
- Home video and its distributors
- Literature
- Media
- Music
- Publishing
- Sex industry
- Talent agency
- Television show
- Theatre production

=== ISIC ===
The industry segment is covered by class "R" of the International Standard Industrial Classification: "Arts, entertainment and recreation".

== See also ==
- Creative industries
- Cultural industry
- Light entertainment
- List of show business families
- Music industry
- Outline of entertainment
- This Is Show Business, television series running from 1949 to 1956
- Show Business magazine
- "There's No Business Like Show Business"
