= Authentic Films =

American film production company

- Company type: Private
- Industry: Film production
- Founders: Kate O'Neil, Kevin Kerwin
- Headquarters: Cleveland, Ohio, US
- Key people: Kate O'Neil (Producer), Kevin Kerwin (Director)

Authentic Films is a film production company based in Cleveland, Ohio, US. It was founded and is owned by Kate O'Neil and Kevin Kerwin. O'Neil is the producer and Kerwin, who has a master's degree in film from Columbia University, is the director. The company creates the trailers for the Cleveland International Film Festival (CIFF).

== Critical reception ==
Authentic Films received praise from Shoot for its 2008 campaign for the Akron Children's Hospital which focused on cancer patients who were being treated there. The 2008 advertising campaign was called "moving". A 2009 follow-up built on the success of the first series of advertisements for the hospital.

== Filmography ==
- Filmic Achievement (2005)
- Running America (2010)
- Live at the Agora (2015)
