= Playmobil: The Movie =

2019 film by Lino DiSalvo

- Theatrical release poster
- Directed by: Lino DiSalvo
- Screenplay by: Blaise Hemingway; Greg Erb; Jason Oremland
- Story by: Lino DiSalvo
- Based on: Playmobil
- Produced by: Aton Soumache; Dimitri Rassam; Moritz Borman; Alexis Vonarb; Axel Von Maydell; Timothy Burrill; Bing Wu
- Starring: Anya Taylor-Joy; Jim Gaffigan; Gabriel Bateman; Adam Lambert; Kenan Thompson; Meghan Trainor; Daniel Radcliffe
- Cinematography: André Turpin
- Edited by: Maurissa Horwitz
- Music by: Heitor Pereira (score and songs); Anne Preven (songs); Stephan Moccio (songs)
- Production company: DMG Entertainment; Morgen Studios; ON Animation Studios; Little Dragon; 2.9 Film Holding Ltd.
- Distributed by: Pathé Distribution (France); StudioCanal (United Kingdom); STXfilms (United States); Concorde Film (Germany)
- Release dates: 10 June 2019 (Annecy); 7 August 2019 (France); 9 August 2019 (United Kingdom); 6 December 2019 (United States)
- Running time: 99 minutes
- Countries: France; United Kingdom; United States; Germany
- Language: English
- Budget: $40–75 million
- Box office: $16.3 million

Playmobil: The Movie is a 2019 animated musical adventure film based on the German toy line Playmobil. The film was directed by Lino DiSalvo (in his feature directorial debut) and written by Blaise Hemingway and the writing team of Greg Erb and Jason Oremland from an original story by DiSalvo. Featuring the voices of Anya Taylor-Joy, Jim Gaffigan, Gabriel Bateman, Adam Lambert, Kenan Thompson, Meghan Trainor, and Daniel Radcliffe, the plot follows a girl who tries to save her brother from a Playmobil world that the two are sucked into and becomes involved in the midst of a population-capturing scheme by Emperor Maximus.

Playmobil: The Movie premiered at the Annecy International Animated Film Festival on 10 June 2019, and was released in France on 7 August, in the United Kingdom on 9 August, and in the United States on 6 December. The film was panned by critics for being a perceived feature-length advertisement, with most criticisms directed to its poor storytelling, musical numbers, characters, tone, and worldbuilding problems, with several unfavourable comparisons to The Lego Movie (2014), although some praise focused on its animation and voice acting. The film was also a commercial failure, grossing only $16.3 million on a $40–75 million budget, with the worst opening weekend ever in the United States for a film playing in over 2,300 theaters.

== Plot ==
Marla is a formerly free-spirited girl who has grown up to be responsible yet overprotective in caring for her brother, Charlie. Charlie has grown lonely and disconnected from her after their parents died in a car accident. One night, Charlie sneaks out to visit a toy museum with a Playmobil exhibit. After Marla arrives and tells Charlie off for running away, a lighthouse illuminates them and transports them to the Playmobil world.

Marla and Charlie–who has been transformed into a Viking warrior–find themselves in the middle of a Viking battle, and Charlie helps them until he is kidnapped by a group of pirates after accidentally stepping on a catapult. Frantic to find her brother, Marla goes to the nearest town hoping to ask for help and runs into Del, the driver of a food truck whose client refuses to pay him over pink hay that causes the town's horses to sprout wings. As Marla tries to form a posse to find Charlie, Del gets her out of trouble when she shows Viking gold to the whole town and agrees to help Marla find her brother in exchange for the gold.

Marla and Del run into Rex Dasher, a secret agent and an old friend of Del. Rex explains that several characters have disappeared, and the group sneaks into a villainous spy headquarters to find information about the disappearances. Despite some issues, they successfully gather the data and escape, but the pirates later capture Rex. He is taken to Constantinopolis and finds Charlie, who had been locked up with other characters by Emperor Maximus, who intends to have the prisoners fight to their deaths. Rex tells Charlie that Marla has been looking for him, which encourages Charlie to break away. However, he later allows himself to be recaptured, so the other characters can escape.

Del recognizes that a device used by the pirates belongs to Glinara, an alien crime lord. After meeting with her in exchange for information, Del offers to pay twice as much as he owes her. Glinara agrees and reveals that she sold the device to Maximus. However, Del cannot uphold his end of the bargain, as Marla only has two pieces of gold left. Angered, Glinara captures them and attempts to drop them into a portal, but they are spared by Glinara's robot servant, Robotitron, who hacks the portal and drops the group into a forest. Del leaves the group, upset by Marla's deception. Marla and Robotitron get lost in the forest until Marla accidentally hits a fairy godmother, who encourages her to continue her search and sends her to Constantinopolis.

Arriving in the city, Marla reaches a coliseum where Charlie is about to fight a Tyrannosaurus rex. Charlie and Marla work together to fight off the T-Rex but to no avail. Del soon arrives with his food truck, and Marla uses the last of Del's pink hay to turn the T-Rex harmless. An enraged Maximus orders his guards to arrest them, but the guards reveal themselves as Rex and the missing warriors, who lock Maximus inside a cage. As everyone celebrates their victory, Marla and Charlie use the T-Rex to fly back to the lighthouse and return to the real world, where it is revealed that they were missing for only five minutes. On good terms, Marla promises Charlie that their relationship will be mended.

== Cast ==
- Anya Taylor-Joy as Marla Brenner, Charlie's older sister, who also voices Marla's Playmobil form. Director Lino DiSalvo cast Taylor-Joy for the "texture" of her voice, and described her performance as "believable and emotional"
- Gabriel Bateman as Charlie Brenner, Marla's younger brother, who also voices Charlie's Playmobil Viking form. As DiSalvo explains, "when I met Gabriel, I totally saw a kid that Spielberg would cast"
  - Ryan S. Hill plays a 6-year-old Charlie
- Jim Gaffigan as Del, a food truck driver who supports himself with several side jobs and is Marla's best friend
- Daniel Radcliffe as Rex Dasher, a secret agent who helps Marla. While normally reluctant to play spy roles in films, Radcliffe accepted the part of Dasher because "there is something incredibly fun about playing an unbelievably confident, kind of to the point of being an oblivious, person who is constantly undercut by other characters who make him realise that maybe he's not as smooth as he thinks he is"
- Adam Lambert as Emperor Maximus, the tyrannical ruler of Constatinopolis. Lambert explained that he played the character as himself "on a really bad day"
- Kenan Thompson as Bloodbones, a pirate captain. In addition to the role's Broadway-level singing demands, the nasally-voiced Thompson also had to perform his lines in a guttural tone, which gave him a "headache"
- Meghan Trainor as The Fairy Godmother, a fairy godmother who Marla encounters in a forest. It was Trainor's childhood dream to play a fairy character, but also a very difficult task: "I've never smiled so hard in my life to make this girl happy and I was jumping up and down." Trainor's involvement in Playmobil: The Movie began while writing "Run Like The River" for her album Treat Myself. "I remember meeting someone who was like, this should be in the movie," explained Trainor; and a week later, she presented the song to DiSalvo: "It looked like it blew his mind"
- Lino DiSalvo as Robotitron, a robot who works for Glinara
- Maddie Taylor as Glinara, an alien crime lord
- Kirk Thornton as Ook Ook, a caveman
- Dan Navarro as Viking Leader
- Cindy Robinson as Nola, an alien bounty hunter
- Paloma Rodriguez as Valera, an Amazon warrior
- Spike Spencer as additional voices
- Benjamin Diskin as Seadog
- Kellen Goff as Salty
- Dino Andrade as Scurvy Pete
- Karen Strassman as Dr. Greta Grim

== Production ==
=== Development ===
An animated feature film based on the Playmobil toyline was first announced in November 2014 with an originally expected release at the end of 2017, set to be produced and animated by the French company ON Entertainment through its Montreal-based studio, ON Animation Studios, with Pathé handling distribution in France and Wild Bunch handling international sales. The toy's film rights were secured by ON Entertainment and its producers Dimitri Rassam and Aton Soumache, with Bob Persichetti originally set to write and direct. By October 2015, the film had a reported budget of $75 million, with US distribution rights initially acquired by Cross Creek Pictures. Persichetti initially pitched the film to Sony Pictures Animation, which attempted to buy the pitch before it fell through. He was eventually offered instead to direct the 2018 superhero film Spider-Man: Into the Spider-Verse.

On 9 February 2016, Lino DiSalvo, who previously worked as an animator at Walt Disney Animation Studios for 17 years, came on board as director, replacing Persichetti. This film marks DiSalvo's directorial debut, with Blaise Hemingway set to write the screenplay, Alexis Vonarb, Axel Von Maydell, and Moritz Borman also producing the film, and US distribution rights being transferred to Open Road Films by 12 May 2016. Maydell was first associated with the Playmobil brand fifteen years before the film's release, when he was involved in producing interactive games for the company.

On 17 November 2017, it was reported that Wendi McLendon-Covey would star in the film. In June 2018, the film's production was underway and some details of the film were revealed, during a session at Annecy International Animated Film Festival. In October 2018, lead voice cast was announced which included Anya Taylor-Joy, Gabriel Bateman, Daniel Radcliffe, Jim Gaffigan, Meghan Trainor, and Adam Lambert.

=== Writing ===
DiSalvo instantly got to work on animatics following Open Road's acquisition, completing five animatics in Los Angeles and Montreal before work on the assets began. The first 15 months of the film's production was spent in Los Angeles, with a crew of ten people. When the project moved to Montreal, 300 people ("more than half of the animation crew at a typical Disney movie") were involved. Both DiSalvo and Hemingway, long-time friends, re-watched their favorite 1980s films like E.T. the Extra-Terrestrial (1982) in writing Playmobil; Hemingway explained that both the movie and the old-school films they referenced knew "how to find what is magical in the most mundane situations."

The producers wanted to capture a child's emotion of playing with toys with Playmobil, which meant DiSalvo had to research. He interviewed more than 200 fans of Playmobil from across the globe, finding that the toy series was mostly enjoyed for its role play element, where "they don't tell you who the hero is — the player defines who the hero is." Thus, he went for a role-playing vibe in writing the film's story. DiSalvo also revisited his childhood home to look at the toys he played with as a kid. The German Playmobil company also sent every Playmobil set ever released to the Los Angeles development location, and the writers used them to conceive characters. A food truck and a figure wearing a Hawaiian shirt, for instance, led to the creation of Del.

Initially, the writers planned Playmobil: The Movie to start with either a shot of an opening storybook or a narration, similar to most fairy tale movies. These ideas were rejected due to not being "organic" enough for the overall product. They finally chose to have opening and closing live-action sequences: "Marla, has lost touch with the child's point of view that she used to have. It felt right to show her in a live-action world where there is no magic. When she finds herself in a very magical situation — which is the entrance to the world of Playmobil, it becomes the catalyst for the whole movie."

=== Animation ===
Playmobil: The Movie was animated with Autodesk Maya, with Julien Bocabeille supervising the film's animation team, which consisted of 56 animators. Being that Playmobil: the Movie was a story about wish fulfillment, the scale was one of the biggest priorities. According to production designer Rémi Salmon: "We see those toys from a kid's eyes, not what he has in front of him but what he imagines. The pirate in his hand has a stiff plastic cape, but when he plays, he sees the cape floating in the wind." The animators' biggest challenges came in the set designs and character animation. While each Playmobil universe varied in tone and lighting due to their differing styles, they had to have some consistencies with the Playmobil world. The Fifth Element and the works of J. J. Abrams were influences in designing the city of Glinara.

Having "a touch of richness and life" in the film's Playmobil world depended on not just the lighting being "pushed pretty far in a very cinematographic way"; but also the characters, particularly their movements and textures. While having plastic hair and skin, the toys were given "a 20 percent freedom to bend and stretch". The animators had to work with limits that came with moving the Playmobil figures, especially when it came to animating faces. The faces are 2D shapes mapped onto 3D heads, meaning that big parts of how human faces are expressed (cheekbones, nose, and jaws) are not present.

Coming up with a convenient workflow for animating 2D faces on 3D objects was another challenge, which Jeremy Ringard and Claude Levastre were responsible for. They first came up with the idea of modeling and rigging the features as 3D shapes, but this led to problems of Z-fighting, intersection, and "floating" appearances in close-up shots. They then thought of a "texture flipbook", where the animators chose from a set of facial features in order to keep the look of the movie consistent; however, they figured that it would disallow any variations to the expressions and be very expensive due to the amount of storage, texture resolution, and file management involved. Finally, they came up with a system where the animators used 3D-rig-controlled 2D shapes that were converted as a dynamic texture applied on the 3D head in the viewport, and the animation would be rendered in real-time through a shader free of resolution or sampling restrictions.

The car Dasher drives is a Porsche Mission E, the 2015 concept version of the Porsche Taycan; Playmobil is the Porsche's first appearance in a major film, and a remote-controlled Mission E toy was released as a movie tie-in.

=== Soundtrack ===
Heitor Pereira's involvement as the film's composer was announced on 21 June 2017. The film features original songs written and performed by Meghan Trainor and Adam Lambert, as announced on the same date the cast was revealed.

"Run Like the River" (sung by Meghan Trainor) was released as a promotional single from the film's soundtrack album on 26 July 2019. The album was released on 2 August 2019.

== Themes and style ==
Today, we have so many cynical movies and TV shows out there, but I wanted to make a movie about a family coming together. Hopefully, parents and their kids will feel the same way about the movie, and appreciate the truthfulness of Playmobil as we tried to explore the wonderful truth that's in these toys.

— DiSalvo on the purpose of Playmobil: The Movie.

Many of us have seen James Bond's films, Clint Eastwood's spaghetti westerns, and cloak and sword films as children. When we started to talk about moving from one genre to another, we ended up like kids playing with their Playmobil in the living room!

— Playmobil producer Tito Ortiz

According to DiSalvo, the moral of Playmobil: The Movie is, "The only rules that matter are the ones you set." As Nick Hasted of The Arts Desk categorized Playmobil, "it's a breezy B-movie in a genre aspiring to Mad comic satire and grand opera;" with an "unpretentious good nature" a la 1980s and 1990s after-school specials. Due to Playmobil being set in a world filled with different universes, the film caricaturizes and plays with the tropes of several genres, including western films, fantasy, science fiction, and musicals. In acknowledging inevitable comparisons to The Lego Movie, DiSalvo claimed, "The movie Lego relied a lot on comedy and wasn't so much driven by characters, while our film will follow more the Disney tradition of storytelling and is meant to appeal to girls as much as boys." According to Tito Ortiz, Playmobil is about the importance of forgiveness, tolerance, and unity in broken families.

DiSalvo also described Playmobil: The Movie as similar to the Tom Hanks film Big (1988), in that the main character has to think like a child to achieve her goal. Its premise of two siblings being sucked into a fantastical setting also garnered comparisons by journalists to The Pagemaster (1994), the Jumanji films, and Pleasantville (1998); while the use of a live-action opening and a brother-and-sister relationship was also in The Lego Movie 2: The Second Part (2019). Some reviewers noted the shedding of gender roles in Playmobil, including Hasted: "When DiSalvo detours to Playmobil's girl-focused range with the arrival of Meghan Trainor's tattooed fairy godmother and pink flying horses, Marla's brisk bravery muddles gender stereotypes with similar irreverence." Caroline Siede honored the film's "Be anything you want to be" message for allowing Marla to be any type of character regardless of her gender, and Charlotte O'Sullivan of the Evening Standard called her a better Susan Pevensie: "Though interested in lipstick, and keen on being grown-up, she is never dismissed as silly or vain." One NBC News review noted Dasher's "pointed jabs about sexist archetypes."

== Release and promotion ==
=== Theatrical ===
Playmobil: The Movie premiered as the opener of the 2019 Annecy festival, which ran from 10 to 15 June 2019. As reported by Cartoon Brew, it "was widely criticized by festival attendees and caused large numbers of the audience to leave in the middle of the film." On 17 June, CineEurope presented a trailer and a clip of Playmobil.

Playmobil: The Movie had its first trailer released on 16 December 2018, with a release date set for 16 August 2019. The second trailer was released on 23 July 2019 with the release date changed to 22 November. Each trailer present a different premise: the first presented the film as focusing on Marla trying to save her brother in a Playmobil. while the second revealed the live-action segments and depicted it as being about Rex Dasher saving the Playmobil population from a secret organization. Ben Pearson of /Film noted that the marketing strategy "trie[d] to shield its actual plot." He also called the film's animation promising: "While the characters are clearly simplified to match the Playmobil toys that inspired them, the animation looks pretty slick and there's some interesting lighting going on in a few of the shots on display here."

Chris Evangelista of /Film wrote upon the first trailer's release, "It's pretty clear that Playmobil: The Movie is skewing to a young audience [...] And while this may seem like a cynical cash-grab, many people felt the same way before the first LEGO Movie came out until the final results proved to be surprisingly enjoyable. Maybe Playmobil will manage to do the same." CNET, also responding to the trailer, opined that "It looks fun and hopefully will boast the same universal appeal as the Lego Movie." Commenting on the second trailer, Screen Rant writer Mike Jones felt the humor had its "own charm and feel" despite being comparable to The Lego Movie: "there does appear to be a decent amount of fun, laughs and adventure on display." However, he also questioned the scheduling of "such a small scale" production being scheduled in a season having to compete with Jumanji: The Next Level and Star Wars: The Rise of Skywalker. Collider's coverage of the second trailer was ecstatic, noting its "fun" factor and opining it had the same meta humor style as The Lego Movie. Sarah El-Mahmoud of Cinema Blend summarized, "the trailer showcases tons of fun action sequences with fast car chases, dinosaurs, and scared squirrels. [...] One has to wonder if a connection to human kids will also be present in this movie as The LEGO Movie and Toy Story do." However, with the awareness that the film was trying to capitalize on the fame of The Lego Movie, she also had skepticism toward its success due to the weak box office of The Lego Movie 2: The Second Part. A PopSugar journalist claimed, "damn, it looks good," also showing enthusiasm for Radcliffe's appearance. According to Geekspin, "a few people already have a hunch that the Playmobil movie will flop at the box office," due to the superior popularity of LEGO over Playmobil, and the film's lack of intellectual properties, and star power.

Playmobil: The Movie was released in France by Pathé on 7 August 2019, on 610 screens, and was released in the US by STX Entertainment on 6 December 2019. It was originally scheduled to be released in the United States by Open Road Films, later renamed Global Road Entertainment, on 18 January 2019, which was later delayed to 19 April 2019. STX bought the U.S. distribution rights to the film in early April 2019 as a result of Global Road's financial issues, with the U.S. release date set to 30 August 2019. On 5 August 2019, STX pushed the U.S. release date back once more to 6 December 2019, among other schedule changes of other films from STX that reportedly happened due to STX having limited cash flow, and wanting to pull their resources in to supporting Hustlers, although STX has denied that this was the case. Upon its release in the United States, STX reportedly encouraged theaters to offer tickets to all showings of the film for just US$5, a significantly lower cost than most American movie tickets. The film news site Moviehole also gave away ten family passes of Playmobil.

In other territories, Playmobil was released to theaters in Belgium, the Netherlands, and Switzerland on 7 August 2019; Bolivia and Israel on 8 August 2019; the United Kingdom on 9 August 2019, Mexico and South Africa on 16 August 2019; Costa Rica, Nicaragua, Panama, Honduras, and Slovakia on 22 August 2019; Poland on 23 August 2019; Germany, Singapore, and Thailand on 29 August 2019; Austria, Indonesia, Spain, and Venezuela on 30 August 2019; Egypt and the Philippines on 4 September 2019; Bahrain, Jordan, Kuwait, Lebanon, Oman, Qatar, the Dominican Republic, and the United Arab Emirates on 5 September 2019; South Korea on 11 September 2019; Czech Republic, Malaysia, Paraguay, and Uruguay on 12 September 2019; Iceland on 13 September 2019; Bulgaria and Sweden on 20 September 2019; Hungary on 26 September 2019; Finland and Romania on 27 September 2019; Portugal on 3 October 2019; Ecuador on 4 October 2019; Argentina on 10 October 2019; Estonia, Lithuania and Latvia on 25 October 2019; Colombia on 7 November 2019; and Australia on 12 December 2019. In Australia, Seven Network's show Sunrise promoted it with a giveaway where two winners received a Playmobil Prize Pack for both tickets to the film and toy sets. The Sunday Times ran a contest where five people could enter to win tickets, with one of them winning an Instax mini-camera in addition.

On 4 February 2020, Playmobil: The Movie VR Adventures, a virtual reality video game, was released on Steam.

=== Home media ===
Playmobil: The Movie was released to Blu-ray in the United Kingdom on 2 December 2019, France on 7 December 2019, Germany on 27 December 2019, Australia on 25 March 2020, and Canada on 30 June 2020. DVDs were released in the United Kingdom on 2 December 2019 and the United States on 3 March 2020. The film was released digitally in France on 7 December 2019, Denmark on 6 January 2020, and the United States on 3 March 2020.

Lionsgate Home Entertainment quietly reprinted the film on DVD on October 7, 2025.

== Reception ==
=== Box office ===
Playmobil: The Movie grossed $1.1 million in the United States and Canada, and $15.2 million in other territories, totaling $16.3 million worldwide.

In France, Playmobil opened to 604 theaters before playing at a maximum of 683 in its third week; it opened at number five with an opening weekend gross of $963,910. By the end of its seven-week run, it grossed a total of $2,627,246.

In the United States, Playmobil: The Movie opened in 2,300 theaters; industry experts predicted the film would have a three-day opening gross of around $905,000 and would likely become a box office bomb. Preview screenings on 4 December and 5 December were very low, with 4 December totaling around $40,000 and 5 December $230,000. As The A.V. Club summarized, "STX is dropping it into U.S. theaters the weekend after Thanksgiving without press screenings, giving it the authentic discount-bin appearance of a toy store going out of business."

The US marketing budget was limited to roughly $3 million, and RelishMix reported a lack of social promotion of any of its stars except for one tweet from Trainor. STX set the marketing money this low due to the film's poor international box office. Boxoffice Pro analyzed the film "would open just two weeks after Frozen II, one week before Jumanji: The Next Level, two weeks before Star Wars: The Rise of the Skywalker, and less than three weeks before Spies in Disguise — all of which are shoe-ins to attract young audiences and dwarf potential interest in Playmobil." According to STX president Kevin Grayson, "STX is a 52-week-a-year business and we were looking for an opportunity to utilize the early December play date."

According to Deadline Hollywood, Playmobil was released only weeks after Frozen II and used a variable pricing strategy where STX and many theater chains offered $5 tickets. Originally projected to gross $600,000–$800,000 on its opening day, Playmobil grossed just $167,000, making it the third-worst opening day of all time for a 2,000-plus theatre production, behind Delgo (2008) and The Oogieloves in the Big Balloon Adventure (2012); fourth if counting the 2014 re-release of Saw (2004) and 24th if also including films with between 1,000 and 1,999 theaters. It went on to gross $660,000 in its opening weekend (an average of $287 per-venue), the fourth-worst of all time.

Shortly after the weekend, Grayson responded that STX would use variable pricing in their future projects: "we have already learned from this experiment. And we will continue to learn more and will tweak it for the future so it can be the benefit to the industry that we know it can be." While the film's several worldwide distributors recouped TV sale money, they also financed it via pre-sales and thus face losses. Rebecca Rubin, a Variety writer, attributed the low box office to the Playmobil brand being far less popular than Lego.

=== Critical response ===
On Rotten Tomatoes, the film has an approval rating of 18% based on 62 reviews, with an average rating of 4.1/10. The site's critical consensus reads: "Much like the toys it advertises, Playmobil: The Movie seems sadly destined to be regarded as a superficially similar yet less desirable alternative to the competition." On Metacritic, the film has a weighted average score of 25 out of 100, based on 13 critics, indicating "generally unfavorable reviews". Audiences polled by CinemaScore gave the film an average grade of "B+" on an A+ to F scale, while those at PostTrak gave it an average 1.5 out of 5 stars, with 36% saying they would definitely recommend it. In the PostTrak grade, adult audiences made up 31% of poll, children under 12 69%; the adult gave the film an average 2.5 stars, the kids under 12 around 3.5 to four stars.

The New Zealand online publication Stuff named it "a strong contender for the worst film of 2019." Reviewers primarily criticized Playmobil: The Movie for being more of an advertisement than a compelling story that practiced its moral about being bold and adventurous. In a Rotten Tomatoes editorial, the site said critics generally called it "a regrettably mediocre outing that offers little aside from a barrage of colorful images and a brisk but ultimately generic and uninspired story." As Entertainment.ie, calling it "the worst animation of the year so far," put it, "the story is boring, the characters are utterly unlikeable [...] one is increasingly struck by the lack of anything new or interesting in the film whatsoever. Its lack of imagination or creativity is painful." A couple of reviews viewed it as part of a major problem of poorly-done toy films from Hollywood. Several reviews made negative comparisons to The Lego Movie, such as a Variety review by Day Lodge that summarized Playmobil: The Movie as The Lego Movie "but without that blockbuster's dizzy, self-aware wit and visual invention."

Nell Minow wrote that "it does not even work as a commercial, never showing us why these toys could be especially fun to play with," and called the settings and toys "bland and generic." Some critics found it way too safe for a film about imagination, including Katherine McLaughlin of The List: "The references are simply too familiar to excite, as it coasts along on nostalgia and a well-worn formula." According to The Observer, "Playmobil shamelessly steals ideas. This eyesore of a cash-in lifts plot elements from Thor and Jumanji, then thinly threads them together with a few songs and shrill mantra about the need for adventure."

Multiple errors in worldbuilding were spotted by critics, such as its odd mixture of replications of historical and fictional settings; and the overly-realistic textures and movements of the Playmobil figures. As Minow explained, "After a whole scene establishing the limited mobility of the Playmobil characters, they suddenly switch to being able to have human-like joints and range of motion." Clariss Loughrey asked, "Shouldn't everything be plastic? Then why do the horses have fur?" Yolanda Machado noted, "Marla can't figure out how to walk without the use of knees and yet, a minute later, she's running." Maryann Johanson noticed even more issues with the figure movements: "A big joke is made out of how Marla, in her Playmobil body, can't walk because she has no knees... and then knees inexplicably appear and she can walk fine. Everyone has elbows, too, which the toy figures also don't have. And everyone is stuck with those clamshell hands, yet are still able to manipulate chopsticks." As Paul Whitington felt, "the themed kingdoms they visit only seem to have been chosen because Playmobil do toys based on these scenarios: sometimes, as in the wild west sequence, they are passed through virtually without comment." The live-action sequences also garnered some derision; one reviewer opined it felt "like something out of an '80s movie," while another panned the sequence's stiff direction.

Salt Lake City Weekly called all of the film's concepts "all pointlessly random and head-smackingly dumb, even when it sounds on paper like it might be funny." According to Machado, Playmobil: The Movie suffered from storytelling "whiplash," using the "mishmash of odd characters" and the sudden death of the main characters' parents as examples. The A.V. Club criticized the choppy plot and erratic pace, reasoning it made Playmobil: The Movie "poorly conceived at every story turn, unable to even stick to a particular generic message to make up for its extremely basic humor." The film's hurried speed also came up in a Radio Times review that stated it "never stops long enough to make its story memorable." Lodge wrote the film had so little amusement it was absent of sight gags, while Minow bashed the inclusion of parental death as too dark for a kid's film. An RTÉ.ie review called its emotional moments "heavy-handed and forced," and criticized the parents' death as "solely a plot device for the sake of plot device." The songs were also called forgettable, generic, and "terrible" by several journalists; one wrote that they "have remarkably little melodic staying power," and another analyzed, "there's no chorus and the characters simply just say things to a tune." However, some reviewers did highlight Taylor-Joy's singing on the opening number.

Playmobil: The Movie wasn't without supporting reviewers. Siede was appreciative towards the "low-key, non-judgmental" writing of the film, praising it for being more "heartfelt and earnest" than other "crass and cheap" offerings usual for children's flicks. O'Sullivan summarized, "for a movie so clearly doubling as product placement, it's also fun, a cartoon (bookended by live-action sequences) which allows talented actors to riff on unexpected themes." She called the characters of Del and Rex "properly funny." Most admirations came towards the characters and performances, especially Radcliffe's voice-acting, the campy villain Emperor Maximus, and Taylor-Joy's acting. Hasted opined, "Taylor-Joy's tendency towards introverted, perhaps dangerous outsiders [...] finds little outlet in mostly mild Marla, but still makes her harassed heroine warmly sympathetic." Sandie Angulo Chen of Common Sense Media gave the film two stars out of five, saying that it was "bland and unoriginal but may still amuse young kids."

Empire gave the film two stars out of five, describing it as "little more than a feature-length commercial" and "old-fashioned, stiff and only suitable for those between the ages of four and ten, but it sure isn't much fun".

== Works cited ==
- "Playmobil: the Movie Presskit" (PDF). UniFrance (in French). 2019.
- Ringard, Jeremy; Levastre, Claude (28 July 2019). Facial pipeline in playmobil: the movie. SIGGRAPH. pp. 1–2. doi:10.1145/3306307.3328207. ISBN 9781450363174. S2CID 198986406.
