= Synthetics (Odyssey 5) =

The Synthetics are a fictional robotic species that appear in the TV show Odyssey 5.

== Sentients ==
The Sentients are an inorganic artificial form of life that feed on information and exist almost entirely in the Internet. They are unable to interact with the physical universe and must produce human appearing avatars known as Synthetics. The sentients are not limited to this form but are also capable of taking more advanced constructs as was the case where one Sentient had 'possessed' an entire building and was capable of reconstructing it. They have personalities and various goals with one Sentient even being described as 'insane'.

== Synthetics ==
The Synthetics, or 'Synths', are human-like artificial bodies created by the sentients in order to interact with the human world. Synthetics are programmed, but each has an individual personality, though they are all connected to one another through a form of hive mind. Furthermore, a notable feature that distinguishes them from humans is that they are cold blooded, which allows them to be detected by thermal imaging technology. Synthetic bodies are faster, stronger and far more difficult to kill than humans.

== Background ==
The Sentients are an advanced race though one that is hidden from the world. They make use of numerous experiments on the human populace such as the use of nanites to create a virus that turns a human into a synthetic.

They possess numerous enemies such as the secretive Cadre that seeks to destroy them as well as the crew of the Odyssey 5 who have been sent back in time to prevent the disaster that destroyed the planet.
