= Women of the Movement =

US historical drama television series

- Genre: Historical drama
- Created by: Marissa Jo Cerar
- Based on: Emmett Till: The Murder That Shocked the World and Propelled the Civil Rights Movement by Devery S. Anderson
- Starring: Adrienne Warren; Tonya Pinkins; Gary Basaraba; Cedric Joe; Glynn Turman; Ray Fisher; Chris Coy; Julia McDermott; Carter Jenkins
- Country of origin: United States
- No. of episodes: 6

Production
- Executive producers: Marissa Jo Cerar; Gina Prince-Bythewood; Jay-Z; Jay Brown; Tyran "Ty Ty" Smith; Will Smith; Aaron Kaplan; James Lassiter; Dana Honor; Rosanna Grace; Alex Foster; John P. Middleton; David Clark
- Running time: 43–54 minutes
- Production companies: Two Drifters; Westbrook Studios; Roc Nation; Kapital Entertainment
- Budget: $39.5 million

Original release
- Network: ABC
- Release: January 6 – January 20, 2022

Related
- Let The World See

Women of the Movement is an American historical drama miniseries that premiered on ABC on January 6, 2022. Created by Marissa Jo Cerar, the series centers on Mamie Till-Mobley, played by Adrienne Warren, who devoted her life to seeking justice for her murdered son Emmett, played by Cedric Joe. Tonya Pinkins also co-stars as Alma Carthan, Emmett's grandmother.

The series is based on the book Emmett Till: The Murder That Shocked the World and Propelled the Civil Rights Movement by Devery S. Anderson. In August 2021 during post-production, the book Death of Innocence: The Story of the Hate Crime That Changed America by Mamie Till-Mobley and Christopher Benson, was also added to the project.

== Background ==
In 1955, Mamie Till-Mobley's son Emmett Till was murdered in Mississippi during the Jim Crow era. Her fight to get justice for him and to make sure he would not be forgotten would ultimately help to spawn the civil rights movement.

== Cast and characters ==
=== Main ===
- Adrienne Warren as Mamie Till-Mobley
- Tonya Pinkins as Alma Carthan, Mamie's mother and Emmett's grandmother
- Cedric Joe as Emmett Louis "Bobo" Till
- Glynn Turman as Rev. Mose Wright, Mamie's uncle
- Ray Fisher as Gene Mobley. Mamie's boyfriend
- Chris Coy as J. W. Milam, Roy's half-brother
- Julia McDermott as Carolyn Bryant, Roy's wife
- Carter Jenkins as Roy Bryant
- Gary Basaraba as Sheriff Clarence Strider

=== Recurring ===
- Jamir Vega as Simeon Wright, Emmett's cousin
- Tony Vaughn as John Carthan
- Joshua Caleb Johnson as Wheeler Parker Jr.
- Leslie Silva as Ruby Hurley, the South-Western Director of the NAACP
- Chris Butler as Rayfield Mooty, a well-networked steel worker from Chicago who takes up Mamie's cause.
- Alex Désert as Dr. Theodore Roosevelt Howard
- Schelle Purcell as Adeline Loggins
- Miles Fowler as Simeon Booker
- Sharon Perry as Clotye Murdock Larsson
- Tongayi Chirisa as Medgar Evers
- Jason Turner as James L. Hicks
- Daniel Abeles as Chet Packton
- Timothy Hutton as Jesse J. Breland, the prosecuting lawyer in Mississippi
- Gil Bellows as Gerald Chatham
- Vivian Fleming-Alvarez as Elizabeth "Lizzie" Wright, the wife of Mose
- Dan Byrd as Dan Wakefield
- Kevin Cutts as Sheriff Smith
- Jason Gaines as Johnny Whitten
- Jason Horgan as J.W. Kellum
- Ted Welch as Harvey Henderson
- Chip Lane as Judge Curtis Swango
- Deja Dee as Willie Mae
- Luke Hardeman as Maurice Wright
- Hudson Hurley as Roy Bryant Jr.
- Todd Barnett as Robert Smith
- Charlotte Haynes Hazzard as Mandy Bradley

== Episodes ==
No.	Title	Directed by	Written by	Original release date	U.S. viewers (millions)
1	"Mother and Son"	Gina Prince-Bythewood	Marissa Jo Cerar	January 6, 2022	3.12
2	"Only Skin"	Tina Mabry	Marissa Jo Cerar	January 6, 2022	3.12
3	"Let the People See"	Tina Mabry	Erica L. Anderson	January 13, 2022	3.08
4	"Manhunt"	Julie Dash	Teleplay by : Cristian Martinez; Story by : Cristian Martinez & Sylvia Franklin	January 13, 2022	3.08
5	"Mothers and Sons"	Julie Dash	Hayley Tyler	January 20, 2022	2.95
6	"The Last Word"	Kasi Lemmons	Marissa Jo Cerar	January 20, 2022	2.95

== Production ==
=== Development ===
Jay-Z, Will Smith and Aaron Kaplan of Roc Nation, Overbrook Entertainment and Kapital Entertainment first tried to produce an untitled miniseries based on the life of Emmett Till at HBO in 2016. While at HBO, the group merged with Rosanna Grace and Nicole Tabs of Serendipity Group Inc, John P. Middleton and Alex Foster of The Middleton Media Group, and David Clark of Mazo Partners. When the project left HBO it was reconceived to focus on women during the civil rights movement. The series, now titled Women of the Movement, began development in April 2020.

On August 28, 2020, on the 65th anniversary of Emmett Till's murder, ABC gave the official green light to the series, with Marissa Jo Cerar coming on board as the writer and Gina Prince-Bythewood confirmed to direct the first episode of the series.

=== Casting ===
On October 16, 2020, Adrienne Warren was cast in a leading role of Mamie Till-Mobley. On November 13, 2020, Niecy Nash joined the series as Alma Carthan, Emmett Till's grandmother. On December 3, 2020, Cedric Joe joined the series as Emmett Till. On December 9, 2020, Glynn Turman joined the series as Mose Wright, Emmett Till's great uncle. On December 17, 2020, Ray Fisher joined the series as Gene Mobley, Mamie's husband. On January 6, 2021, it was announced that Tonya Pinkins had replaced Nash in the role of Alma Carthan. On January 11, 2021, Chris Coy, Julia McDermott and Carter Jenkins joined the series as J. W. Milam, Carolyn Bryant and Roy Bryant, respectively. On March 10, 2021, Joshua Caleb Johnson was cast in a recurring role. On April 13, 2021, Leslie Silva, Chris Butler, Alex Désert, Miles Fowler, Tongayi Chirisa, Jason Turner, and Daniel Abeles joined the cast in recurring roles. In June 2021, Gary Basaraba joined the cast. In August 2021, Timothy Hutton was cast in a recurring role.

== Release ==
On October 21, 2021, ABC released a teaser trailer for the miniseries. The first two episodes premiered on January 6, 2022.

== Reception ==
=== Critical response ===
The review aggregator website Rotten Tomatoes reported an 89% approval rating with an average rating of 6.8/10, based on 19 critic reviews. The website's critics consensus reads, "Women of the Movement enlivens the tragedy of Emmett Till with solid storytelling and a deeply moving pair of performances by Adrienne Warren and Cedric Joe." Metacritic, which uses a weighted average, assigned a score of 71 out of 100 based on 15 critics, indicating "generally favorable reviews".

=== Ratings ===
Viewership and ratings per episode of Women of the Movement
No.	Title	Air date	Rating (18–49)	Viewers (millions)	DVR (18–49)	DVR viewers (millions)	Total (18–49)	Total viewers (millions)
1–2	"Mother and Son" / "Only Skin"	January 6, 2022	0.4	3.12	TBD	TBD	TBD	TBD
3–4	"Let the People See" / "Manhunt"	January 13, 2022	0.5	3.08	TBD	TBD	TBD	TBD
5–6	"Mothers and Sons" / "The Last Word"	January 20, 2022	0.4	2.95	TBD	TBD	TBD	TBD

=== Accolades ===
Accolades received by Black Panther: Wakanda Forever
Award	Date of ceremony	Category	Recipient(s)	Result	Ref.
Golden Trailer Awards	October 6, 2022	Best BTS/EPK for a TV/Streaming Series (Under 2 minutes)	ABC for “Mobley Tribute”	Nominated	
Black Reel Awards	February 28, 2022	Outstanding Supporting Actor, TV Movie/Limited Series	Glynn Turman	Won	
Black Reel Awards	February 28, 2022	Outstanding Directing, TV Movie/Limited Series	Gina Prince-Bythewood	Nominated	
NAACP Image Awards	February 25, 2023	Outstanding Television Movie, Mini-Series or Dramatic Special	Women of the Movement	Nominated	
NAACP Image Awards	February 25, 2023	Outstanding Directing in a Drama Series	Kasi Lemmons for "The Last Word"	Nominated	
NAACP Image Awards	February 25, 2023	Outstanding Directing in a Drama Series	Gina Prince-Bythewood for "Mother and Son"	Nominated	
NAACP Image Awards	February 25, 2023	Outstanding Writing in a Dramatic Series	Marissa Jo Cerar for "Mother and Son"	Won	
NAACP Image Awards	February 25, 2023	Outstanding Supporting Actor in a Television Movie, Limited-Series or Dramatic Special	Glynn Turman	Nominated	

== See also ==
- Civil rights movement in popular culture
- Till, also released in 2022
