= The 99'ers =

- Directed by: Nicole Kassell
- Screenplay by: Jill Mazursky and Jamee Decio: Katie Lovejoy; Dana Stevens; Peter Hedges
- Based on: The Girls of Summer: The U.S. Women’s Soccer Team and How It Changed the World by Jeré Longman
- Produced by: Liza Chasin; Hayley Stool; Ross Greenburg
- Starring: Zoey Deutch; Emily Bader; Emilia Jones; Alessandro Nivola
- Cinematography: John Guleserian
- Production company: 3Dot Productions
- Distributed by: Netflix
- Country: United States
- Language: English

The 99'ers is an upcoming American biographical sports drama film following the United States women's national soccer team during the 1999 FIFA Women's World Cup.

== Cast ==
- Zoey Deutch as Marla Messing
- Emily Bader as Mia Hamm
- Emilia Jones as Julie Foudy
- Alessandro Nivola as Tony DiCicco
- Julia McDermott as Brandi Chastain
- Shaunette Renée Wilson as Briana Scurry
- Perry Mattfeld as Michelle Akers
- Annabel O'Hagan as Carla Overbeck
- Lizzy Greene as Kristine Lilly
- Isabelle Fuhrman as Joy Fawcett

== Production ==
In April 2025, it was announced that Nicole Kassell would direct The 99'ers from a script by Katie Lovejoy, Dana Stevens, and Peter Hedges; Netflix was set to distribute.

In January 2026, Emily Bader and Zoey Deutch signed on to star. In February 2026, Emilia Jones and Alessandro Nivola joined the cast. In March 2026, Julia McDermott, Shaunette Renee Wilson, Perry Mattfeld, Annabel O'Hagan, Lizzy Greene, and Isabelle Fuhrman rounded out the cast.

Principal photography began on April 9, 2026 in New Jersey, with John Guleserian as the cinematographer.
