= David Lee Molner =

- Born: David Lee Molner; November 3, 1969 (age 56)
- Citizenship: American
- Education: Trinity College (Connecticut)
- Alma mater: Trinity College (B.A.)
- Occupations: Financier, media executive
- Years active: 1995–present
- Employer: Screen Capital International
- Known for: Film finance and entertainment finance
- Title: Founder and Managing Director

David Lee Molner (born November 3, 1969) is an American film financier and media executive. He is the founder and managing director of Screen Capital International, a company specializing in film and entertainment finance.

== Career ==
Earlier in his career, Molner worked as a senior vice president at Viacom Entertainment Group and Paramount Pictures from 1995 to 2000. He studied at Trinity College in Hartford, where he earned a Bachelor of Arts degree in philosophy and language.

Molner has worked in media and entertainment finance since the early 2000s. His professional background includes serving as managing director of Screen Capital International and Ajax Financial Holdings, firms focused on financing companies and transactions in the media, entertainment, and sports sectors. He was also associated with Aramid Entertainment Fund, a film-finance fund that later became the subject of Chapter 11 bankruptcy proceedings in the Southern District of New York.

Molner serves as CEO of A-Company Film Licensing International GmbH and is a director or member of the board of directors of A-Company Filmed Entertainment AG. Molner has held executive or management positions at Ajax Financial Holdings Ltd., Atlantic Screen Capital Limited, and other companies in the audiovisual industry.

== Legal proceedings ==
Molner has been a party to several civil lawsuits in New York State. In 2010, a group of investors in Aramid Entertainment Fund filed a lawsuit against Molner, alleging that fund assets had been misappropriated and used to finance unrelated business ventures and personal expenses. Molner denied the allegations.

In 2011, an independent investigation conducted during the litigation concluded that the allegations against Molner were unsupported. The parties subsequently settled the litigation, with the investors dismissing their claims against Molner.

In the case of Meckler v. Molner, filed in 2019, the dispute concerned a loan granted to Molner. After a series of legal proceedings, the Appellate Division, First Department, affirmed in 2022 a ruling that the dispute was to be resolved through arbitration, holding that the court could designate an arbitral forum after the parties failed to agree on one. In 2023, the New York Supreme Court upheld the arbitral award in favor of Alan Meckler and ordered the payment of $215,000. The lawsuit sought to recover a loan.

The Aramid bankruptcy concerned Aramid Entertainment Fund Limited and related debtors in Chapter 11 proceedings filed in the United States Bankruptcy Court for the Southern District of New York. Court materials describe the fund as a debtor group connected to film-finance investments and identify Molner as having worked for, managed, or been otherwise connected to the fund through related management entities.

In 2016, Aramid Entertainment Fund Limited and related parties filed an adversary proceeding against Molner, Aramid Capital Partners LLP, Screen Capital International Corp., and Genco Capital Corp. in the bankruptcy court. The docket described the case as an action for recovery of money or property and listed the proceeding as closed in 2022.

In 2020, Molner filed a counterclaim in the Aramid Entertainment Fund bankruptcy proceedings against the law firm Reed Smith LLP, some of its attorneys, and other individuals involved in the fund’s administration and liquidation. In January 2022, the United States District Court for the Southern District of New York dismissed Molner’s appeal of that remand ruling for lack of appellate jurisdiction. On September 4, 2024, the bankruptcy court granted four motions to dismiss Molner’s first amended complaint, ending the adversary proceeding subject to any timely appeal.

In Adler v. Molner, New York County Supreme Court decisions described claims by investors against David Molner, Naomi Molner, Joseph Meli, and Advance Entertainment, LLC arising from alleged ticket resale investments for concerts by artists including the Grateful Dead and Adele. The 2018 decision stated that the complaint alleged Meli and Molner were friends involved in the ticket resale industry, that Meli owned Advance, and that Molner was an investor, advisor, or partner in Advance who prepared presentations and distributed funding agreements for the investment opportunities. The 2022 decision addressed plaintiffs’ motion for summary judgment on liability for fraud, fraudulent inducement, fraudulent misrepresentation, and aiding and abetting Meli’s alleged fraud, as well as Molner’s discovery-sanctions cross-motion; the description reflects allegations and procedural rulings rather than a final factual finding on all claims.

Molner has also appeared as a litigant in other reported matters, including Molner v. Molner matrimonial appeals and an adversary proceeding in the Aramid Entertainment Fund bankruptcy, in which he asserted claims against attorneys, directors, and liquidators; the bankruptcy court decision reported that the defendants’ motions to dismiss were granted.
