= Clotye Murdock Larsson =

American journalist (1928-2009)

Clotye Murdock Larsson (born Clotye Marnell Murdock; July 25, 1928 – April 14, 2009) was an American journalist.

== Life and career ==
Larsson studied at Roosevelt University in Chicago, Fisk University, Wayne State University and University of Wisconsin. She was a journalist at Michigan Chronicle before joining Jet and Ebony, where she worked as an associate editor from 1951 to 1958.

Larsson is best known for being the lone female reporter covering the Emmett Till trial (J.W. Milam and Roy Bryant murder trial) for Ebony magazine in 1955 alongside reporters Simeon Booker, Moses Newson and photographer David Jackson. She later published two articles in Ebony related to the Emmett Till case: "Land of the Till Murder," in 1956, and "Land of the Till Murder Revisited," in 1986.

== In popular culture ==
Larsson was portrayed by actress Rolonda Watts in the 2022 play That Summer in Sumner (of the Till trilogy) at Mosaic Theater Company.

Larsson was portrayted by Sharo Perry in Women of the Movement, an American historical drama miniseries that premiered on ABC on January 6, 2022.

== Books ==
- Marriage across the Color Line. (1965) Johnson Publishing Company ISBN 978-0-87485-014-7.
