= Monsanto (film) =

Upcoming film by John Lee Hancock

- Directed by: John Lee Hancock
- Screenplay by: John Lee Hancock; Michael Wisner; Alexandra Duparc; Ned Benson
- Produced by: Moritz Borman; Eric Kopeloff; Philip Schulz-Deyle; Jon Levin; Adam McKay; Kevin Messick
- Starring: Jonathan Bailey; Laura Dern; Lakeith Stanfield; Greg Kinnear; Julia McDermott; David Duchovny; Melonie Diaz; Bilal Hasna
- Cinematography: John Schwartzman
- Production companies: Hyperobject Industries; Onda Entertainment; KrautPack Entertainment
- Distributed by: Netflix
- Countries: United States; Germany
- Language: English

Monsanto is an upcoming biographical legal drama film directed by John Lee Hancock and co-written by Michael Wisner, Alexandra Duparc, and Ned Benson. It stars Jonathan Bailey, Laura Dern, Lakeith Stanfield, Greg Kinnear, Julia McDermott, David Duchovny, Melonie Diaz, and Bilal Hasna.

== Cast ==
- Jonathan Bailey as Brent Wisner
- Laura Dern as Dr. Melinda Rogers
- Lakeith Stanfield as Dewayne Johnson
- Greg Kinnear
- Julia McDermott
- David Duchovny
- Melonie Diaz
- Bilal Hasna

== Production ==
In May 2024, it was announced that John Lee Hancock would be directing and co-writing a biographical legal drama film based on the Johnson v. Monsanto Co. lawsuit, with Glen Powell, Anthony Mackie, and Laura Dern starring. By April 2026, Powell and Mackie had exited the project, with Jonathan Bailey and Lakeith Stanfield cast instead. John Schwartzman served as the cinematographer. Principal photography began in June 2026, in Bavaria, when Greg Kinnear, Julia McDermott, David Duchovny, Melonie Diaz, and Bilal Hasna joined the cast. Netflix acquired the distribution rights.
