= Weather Girl (2024 play) =

2024 one-actor comedic play

- 2025 Off-Broadway production poster
- Original language: English
- Written by: Brian Watkins
- Characters: Stacey
- Genre: Comedy

Premiere
- Date: August 1, 2024
- Place: Edinburgh Fringe Festival

Weather Girl is a one-actor comedic play, written by Brian Watkins and produced by Francesca Moody Productions, about the climate change apocalypse as seen through the eyes of a weather girl. It played at the 2024 Edinburgh Festival Fringe, where it starred American actress Julia McDermott, was directed by Tyne Rafaeli.

== Plot ==
The play follows one woman, Stacey, a California weather girl whose cheery on-screen persona contrasts her secret alcoholic tendencies. As her reporting begins to cover the California wildfires, she begins to spiral as her past upends her present.

== Production history ==
=== 2024 Edinburgh Fringe Festival production ===
The play first premiered in 2024 at the Edinburgh Fringe Festival starring American actress Julia McDermott and directed by Tyne Rafaeli in a sold-out run.

=== 2025 London production ===
Next, the production made its West End debut in 2025 at Soho Theatre, running from March 5 to April 5, 2025 with McDermott and Rafaeli returning to act and direct, respectively.

=== 2025 Off-Broadway production ===
The production next transferred Off-Broadway to St. Ann's Warehouse in late 2025, running from September 16 to October 12, 2025, with Rafaeli returning as director and McDermott again reprising her role as Stacey.

=== Additional runs ===
The show is scheduled at The Spot Sun Valley theater in Ketchum, Idaho from August 26-30, 2026, the first with a new lead with Yanna Lantz as Stacey.

It is also scheduled for GableStage in Coral Gables, Fla. in fall 2026, running from September 25 to October 18, with Nicole Stodard directing and Ella Olesen starring in the role of Stacey.

== Critical reception ==
"It's a dark, dark story. It's raw. But it's also hilarious," said Anna Jane Joyner, founder of Good Energy, a company that consults on TV shows and movies that deal with climate change. "I walked away from it feeling even more fiercely in love with this world and even more committed to trying to protect it."

== Awards and nominations ==
=== 2025 Off-Broadway production ===
Year	Award	Category	Work	Result	Ref.
2026	Drama Desk Award	Outstanding Solo Performance	Julia McDermott	Nominated	
2026	Drama Desk Award	Outstanding Sound Design of a Play	Kieran Lucas	Nominated	

== Television adaptation ==
In 2025, Netflix acquired the rights to produce a limited series, with McDermott set to reprise her role.
