= The Orpheus Syndrome =

- Poker Face episode
- Episode no.: Season 1 Episode 8
- Directed by: Natasha Lyonne
- Written by: Natasha Lyonne; Alice Ju
- Teleplay by: Joe Lawson
- Cinematography by: Jaron Presant
- Editing by: Shaheed Qaasim
- Original release date: February 23, 2023
- Running time: 57 minutes

Guest appearances
- Nick Nolte as Arthur Liptin; Cherry Jones as Laura; Luis Guzmán as Raoul; Rowan Blanchard as Lily Albern; Tim Russ as Max; Sean Ono Lennon as Guest #1; Charlotte Kemp Muhl as Guest #2

Episode chronology
| ← Previous "The Future of the Sport" | Next → "Escape from Shit Mountain" |

"The Orpheus Syndrome" is the eighth episode of the American murder mystery comedy-drama television series Poker Face. The episode was written by lead actress and executive producer Natasha Lyonne and consulting producer Alice Ju, and directed by Lyonne. It was released on Peacock on February 23, 2023.

The series follows Charlie Cale, a woman with the ability to detect if people are lying; after exposing a murder plot at a casino, she is now on the run from the owner's enforcer Cliff LeGrand. In the episode, Charlie works as an assistant to a retired special effects artist. After her friend dies, Charlie sets out to unravel the truth.

The episode received near-universal critical acclaim, with critics praising the writing, performances, Lyonne's directing, humor, cinematography, and special effects.

== Plot ==
In New York State, film industry veterans Max (Tim Russ) and Laura (Cherry Jones) argue over an unknown subject, culminating with Max jumping off the balcony to his death. A week later, Laura visits their mutual friend Arthur Liptin (Nick Nolte), a reclusive visual effects artist and co-founder of their company, Lights and Motion (LAM). She claims the dispute with Max was about their impending divorce and, feeling guilty, asks Arthur to recreate Max's likeness for therapeutic reasons. Two weeks later, Laura receives an uncannily realistic bust of Max and uses it to unlock his laptop.

It is revealed in a flashback that Max confronted Laura over proofs that would incriminate her in a forty-year-old incident. She tried to kill him with poisoned tea and Max, knowing he would die anyway, jumped headfirst to the rocks below their house, smashing his face so that she could not use it to access his laptop. In the present, Laura manages to delete the evidence, a digital copy of behind-the-scenes footage of the unfinished 1980s film Dragonfish. She then calls the archives department of LAM, now going after the original film reel.

Three weeks prior, Charlie (Natasha Lyonne) works at a barbershop and is tasked with taking a bag of hair to a farmhouse. The farmhouse is actually the workshop of Arthur, who has just returned from burying Max. Charlie partakes in his grief-driven drinking and they bond. Fascinated by his work, she convinces the old man to hire her as his assistant. A week later, she witnesses Laura commissioning Max's bust and realizes she is lying.

As they work on the sculpture, Arthur tells Charlie of his past: Arthur was filming what was to be his directorial debut in 1989, the monster movie Dragonfish, and the lead actress, Lily Albern (Rowan Blanchard), had difficulties finishing a scene in a water tank. She was pressured to continue by a frustrated Arthur, with Max and Laura present. Lily eventually drowned, leading Arthur to quit the film industry out of guilt. Charlie notes that his personal project, the experimental stop-motion feature he calls The Orpheus Syndrome, is rife with allegories of the incident. Deducing he is still trying to cope, she tells him to "revisit the past to get past it". Two weeks pass and Charlie delivers the bust to Laura.

Following her advice, Arthur contacts Raoul (Luis Guzmán), LAM's film archivist, to retrieve the film reel of the incident. He discovers that Laura was responsible for Lily's death by disabling the light that would have alerted to her drowning. He confronts Laura, who has just called Raoul herself to get the footage, only to learn that Arthur has it. Arthur claims he will protect her and destroys the reel before leaving. However, Laura discovers that the reel is missing some parts, while Arthur collapses back home after having been preemptively poisoned by Laura. Charlie calls for help and leaves to avoid detection but notices the decorative gravel from Laura's driveway embedded in Arthur's tires. Arthur is pronounced dead. The next day, Charlie sees Laura to inquire about Arthur's visit, and detects that she is lying when she denies involvement in his and Max's deaths.

Charlie returns to the workshop and stumbles upon Raoul. Together they infer what has actually happened, just before Laura barges in with LAM workers to seize Arthur's possessions for a memorial exhibit. Charlie notices that she missed the incriminating film, hidden in one of Arthur's sculptures. She infiltrates LAM's exhibit but is caught by Laura, who has her removed from the building and fires Raoul. However, Raoul's keycard is not deactivated, so he helps Charlie infiltrate LAM again. They retrieve the reel and play it in front of the attendees. Now exposed and wracked with guilt for her role in Lily's death, Laura begins to hallucinate Arthur in the crowd and the exhibit coming to life. She eventually runs after a vision of Max and follows it in jumping off a balcony. Charlie and Raoul fail to catch up with her and are horrified as they find her body, her face with an expression of peace on it.

== Production ==
=== Development ===
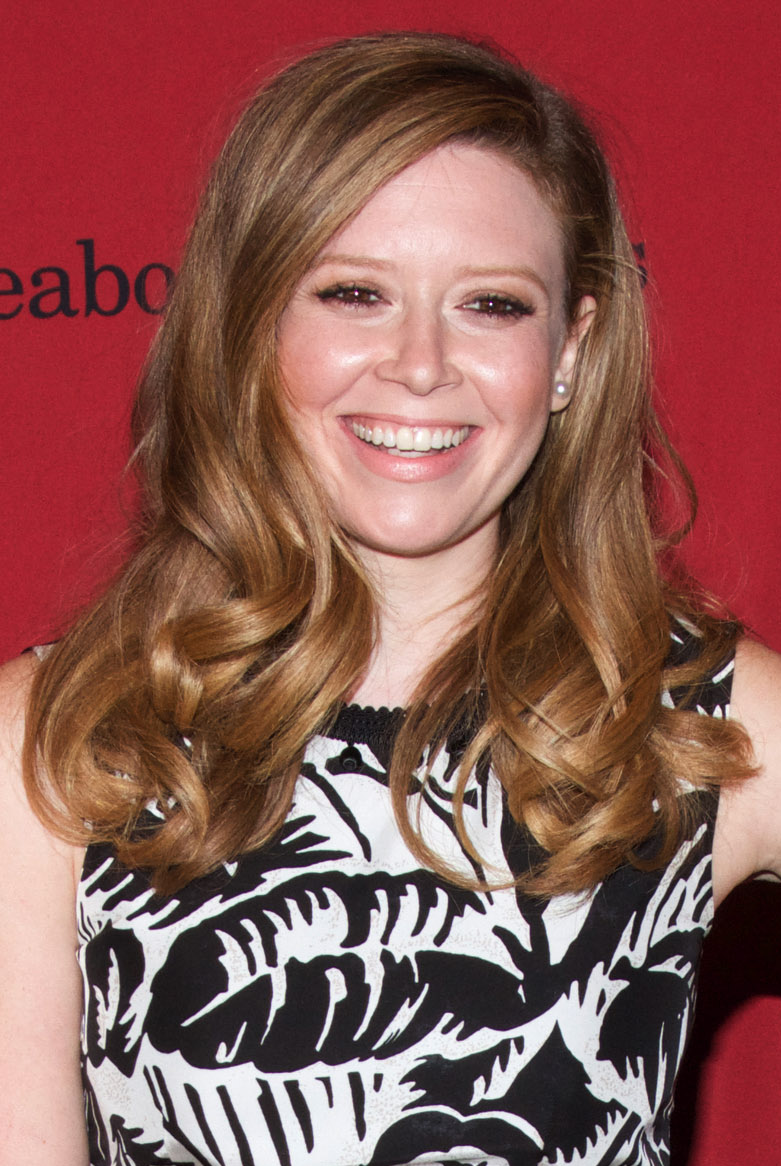
Lead actress Natasha Lyonne co-wrote and directed the episode.

The series was announced in March 2021, with Rian Johnson serving as creator, writer, director and executive producer. Johnson stated that the series would delve into "the type of fun, character driven, case-of-the-week mystery goodness I grew up watching." The episode was directed by lead actress and executive producer Natasha Lyonne, while Lyonne and consulting producer Alice Ju wrote it. This was Lyonne's first directing credit, her first writing credit, and Ju's second writing credit for the show.

Johnson himself asked Lyonne to write and direct an episode of the series, saying "when you see her putting all that energy and focus into the creative act of controlling a set and getting what she wants, it's like a butterfly unfolding its wings." The crew used Vertigo as an influence on the episode, with Lilla Zuckerman saying that Lyonne was chosen as "we knew that she could shoot the hell out of it, and come up with a really compelling story."

=== Casting ===
The announcement of the series included that Natasha Lyonne would serve as the main lead actress. She was approached by Johnson about working on a procedural project together, with Lyonne as the lead character. As Johnson explained, the role was "completely cut to measure for her."

Due to the series' procedural aspects, the episodes feature several guest stars. Johnson was inspired by the number of actors who guest starred on Columbo, wanting to deem each guest star as the star of the episode, which allowed them to attract many actors. The episode featured appearances by Nick Nolte, Cherry Jones, Luis Guzmán, and Rowan Blanchard, who were announced to guest star in August, September and October 2022, respectively. Lyonne called Nolte an "intimidating but terrific" person, saying "Because we're both troublemakers, so we speak of the same English." While accepting to appear, Jones was concerned that the role was not suitable for her, although her fears were erased as Lyonne explained that her character would be similar to Kim Novak in Vertigo.

Additionally, musicians and real-life couple Sean Ono Lennon and Charlotte Kemp Muhl appear as cameos near the end of the episode.

=== Writing ===
Rian Johnson described the episode as a "love letter" to Phil Tippett, a film director and visual effects supervisor and producer. The writers felt inspired by one of his documentaries, Mad Dreams and Monsters, into creating the episode.

Despite the writing credit, Lyonne was in the writers' room after filming Russian Doll. Lyonne noted that had Arthur not died in the episode, it could change the course of the series. She said, "to a certain extent, as we wrap out the back half, I can definitely see the track between how Nolte not being a final home changes her point of view of it. It cements her status as a lone wolf, in a way."

=== Special effects ===
Tippett himself helped in the special effects for the episode. Johnson brought in Tippett to help with the episode, having previously worked with him. Besides creating Arthur's model creatures, he also coordinated with a team from Tippett Studio in the stop motion sequence at the end of the episode. Some of the props used for the episode were taken from Tippett's film, Mad God, as Tippett felt it would be "a missed opportunity" not to use them.

The episode includes a maquette of Max, played by Tim Russ. For some of the filming scenes, the crew actually used Russ himself to film the scenes, who stood still for the required time.

Scenes depicting the LAM studios were filmed at the IBM Somers Office Complex.

== Critical reception ==
"The Orpheus Syndrome" received near universal critical acclaim. Saloni Gajjar of The A.V. Club gave the episode an "A–" grade and wrote, "If you strip down the flashy layers of Poker Face's eighth episode, the central mystery is relatively mundane. A woman kills the two men who threatened to reveal a secret from their shared past because it would ruin the career she spent 40 years building. The case is not a standout in a 'My brother going vegan will bankrupt us,' 'I used to be a domestic terrorist,' or 'I want to reclaim my band's glory days' way. But this is Poker Face, so why would we strip anything away? The spectacular set design, props, and performances elevate a hackneyed mystery into one of the show's creepiest outings yet. As an added bonus: Series star Natasha Lyonne expertly directs the hour."

Alan Sepinwall of Rolling Stone wrote, "The episode not only lived up to my hopes, but exceeded them. It's Poker Face doing Hitchcock, down to composer Nathan Johnson doing his damndest to evoke Bernard Herrmann's Vertigo score (as well as various Universal TV and film scores of the 1960s and early 1970s). It looks great, it sounds great, and Charlie's friendship with ruined special effects wizard Arthur felt even deeper than the other bonds she's forged over the course of this season."

Amanda Whiting of Vulture gave the episode a 3 star rating out of 5 and wrote, "Charlie crashing the party in a (Trojan) horse costume feels hokey compared to the psychological torture conjured in 'The Orpheus Syndrome', co-written and directed by Natasha Lyonne. Other installments have made Charlie's role small, but here she's almost unnecessary. Long before Laura lied to her twitching face, she had violated the episode god's final command: She looked over her shoulder at all the mess she'd spent her whole life making." Sarah Fields of Telltale TV gave the episode a perfect 5 star rating out of 5 and wrote, "TV doesn't get much better than 'The Orpheus Syndrome'. From start to finish and at every level, it is storytelling at its absolute best."
