= The Future of the Sport =

- Poker Face episode
- Episode no.: Season 1 Episode 7
- Directed by: Iain B. MacDonald
- Story by: Joe Lawson; CS Fischer
- Teleplay by: Joe Lawson
- Cinematography by: Christine Ng
- Editing by: Paul Swain
- Original release date: February 16, 2023
- Running time: 48 minutes

Guest appearances
- Tim Blake Nelson as Keith Owens; Charles Melton as Davis McDowell; Leslie Silva as Donna Owens; Angel Desai as Jean McDowell; Jasmine Aiyana Garvin as Katy Owens; Jack Alcott as Randy

Episode chronology
← Previous "Exit Stage Death"	Next → "The Orpheus Syndrome"

"The Future of the Sport" is the seventh episode of the American murder mystery comedy-drama television series Poker Face. The episode was written by co-executive producer Joe Lawson from a story by Lawson and CS Fischer and directed by executive producer Iain B. MacDonald. It was released on Peacock on February 16, 2023.

The series follows Charlie Cale, a woman with the ability to detect if people are lying; after exposing a murder plot at a casino, she is now on the run from the owner's enforcer Cliff LeGrand. In the episode, Charlie befriends a dirt track racing driver competing with a veteran. When there is an accident in the speedway, Charlie sets out to find the truth.

The episode received positive reviews from critics, who praised the directing, racing sequences, performances and twists.

== Plot ==
At the Peach Tree Speedway in Tennessee, late model racing drivers Keith Owens (Tim Blake Nelson), a third-generation star in his final season, and hot-headed up-and-comer Davis McDowell (Charles Melton) compete for the local championship. During the lap race, Keith takes the lead but experiences hand tremors and self-doubt. Davis rams Keith's car, causing him to spin out and thus lose. At the press conference, Keith denies he is retiring, which surprises his family, and engages in fisticuffs with Davis. The announcement angers his daughter Katy (Jasmine Aiyana Garvin), who is eager to begin her racing career, and worries his wife Donna (Leslie Silva), who witnesses Davis vandalizing her garden. That night, Keith sneaks into Davis' garage and sabotages the car. During practice the car malfunctions and crashes, bursting into flames.

A few days prior, Charlie (Natasha Lyonne) works at a go-kart track and is friends with her co-worker Jean (Angel Desai), Davis' mother. When he is not racing or towing cars, Davis helps out at the arcade and admits that he hopes to earn enough money to compete in the big leagues. Katy confronts Davis about punching Keith and challenges him on the track, effortlessly defeating him repeatedly, and his anger prompts him to vandalize the Owens' garden. That night, as Jean fields a tow truck call from Keith, Davis witnesses Keith sabotaging his car. Davis inspects the car, finding a fish hook and gear tie in the carburetor. Instead of fixing it, he sabotages it even further by damaging the safety harness.

During a practice session, Davis offers Katy the chance to break his record, which she accepts. Unbeknownst to Keith, Katy is behind the wheel of the car when it crashes into a wall. He is delighted when the car crashes but is devastated when he discovers that his daughter was driving. With Katy in a coma, Davis is suspended for letting her drive the car. Aware of Charlie's ability to detect lies, he evades suspicion by stating that his car was sabotaged. He has the car inspected, finding Keith's hook, which would cause a car crash. He wants to confront Keith, but Charlie convinces him to let her do so instead. Confronting him, she realizes he sabotaged the car. Later, Keith issues a confession on television, admitting to sabotaging the car but claiming he did not want anyone to get hurt. Davis is declared the winner of the championship and starts getting offers from sponsors.

Charlie starts suspecting Davis when he claims Katy's seatbelt malfunction was an accident, which she perceives as a lie. Realizing that he was at home when Keith sneaked into the garage, she checks the garage but is caught by Davis. When he refuses to answer her suspicions, she realizes he was responsible for Katy's crash. She avoids death when Jean shows up and forces Davis to let her go. Davis attempts to chase her in his tow truck but fails to catch her. The next day, backed by his new sponsor, Davis prepares to compete before Charlie surprises him. She knows he was not planning on racing the car on the day of the crash as he did not have his grandfather's photo on the dashboard and also talked to Katy, who is expected to recover from her coma and soon compete against Davis. Charlie walks away while the race is about to begin. Davis notices his hand trembling, similar to Keith at the beginning of the episode.

== Production ==
=== Development ===
The series was announced in March 2021, with Rian Johnson serving as creator, writer, director and executive producer. Johnson stated that the series would delve into "the type of fun, character driven, case-of-the-week mystery goodness I grew up watching." The episode was directed by executive producer Iain B. MacDonald, while co-executive producer Joe Lawson wrote it from a story by himself and CS Fischer. This was MacDonald's second directing credit, and Lawson's first writing credit for the show.

=== Casting ===
The announcement of the series included that Natasha Lyonne would serve as the main lead actress. She was approached by Johnson about working on a procedural project together, with Lyonne as the lead character. As Johnson explained, the role was "completely cut to measure for her."

Due to the series' procedural aspects, the episodes feature several guest stars. Johnson was inspired by the amount of actors who guest starred on Columbo, wanting to deem each guest star as the star of the episode, which allowed them to attract many actors. The episode featured appearances by Tim Blake Nelson, Charles Melton, Angel Desai, Jasmine Aiyana Garvin and Leslie Silva, who were announced to guest star in August 2022. Nelson previously worked with Lyonne in past projects, which motivated him to accept the role.

=== Writing ===
The concept of the episode was conceived by assistant CS Fischer, who suggested the plot twist. Joe Lawson wrote the episode, inspired by his knowledge of racing. Co-showrunner Nora Zuckerman was unfamiliar with stock car racing although she was interested in seeing the series explore it: "To me, it felt much more Poker Face. Like Charlie's not going to NASCAR with the big sponsors and the beer tents. And we had a lot of fun learning about that world."

Regarding the ending, co-showrunner Lilla Zuckerman explained, "We loved the idea of the book ends of the shaky hands because it's just like this harbinger of doom. At that point, you're screwed if you've lost your flow. We felt like it was just the emotionally satisfying conclusion to that story. You don't need to see him getting his ass whooped by Katy because you know it's coming. And that's the satisfaction of that moment."

=== Filming ===
The Orange County Fair Speedway in Middletown, Orange County, New York was used as the filming location for the speedway in the episode. The crew was inspired by films like Smokey and the Bandit and Six Pack for the racing sequences, with Zuckerman saying "We really wanted to capture the dirt, the grit, the smell of the fuel in the air and the sound."

== Critical reception ==
"The Future of the Sport" received extremely positive reviews from critics. Saloni Gajjar of The A.V. Club gave the episode an "A–" grade and wrote, "The mystery this week is top-notch as PF subverts its format yet again. It's not a simpler case like early episodes, with the deaths of Natalie, Damian, or George, where the killer is revealed in the opening act. Yes, we still know who did it, but there are plenty of twists along the way for Charlie to discover and for us to engage with."

Alan Sepinwall of Rolling Stone wrote, "The show continues to have fun inserting Charlie into various subcultures, here with the world of dirt track racing. I might have watched an entire hour of Natasha Lyonne playing video games. And the night driving sequence where all we can really see are her eyes was wonderfully atmospheric. I imagine on a weekly schedule/budget, there was no way to do a serious car chase, so that was a good example of how to turn limitations to a scene's advantage, making it so atmospheric that the lack of Fast and the Furious maneuvering doesn't matter."

Amanda Whiting of Vulture gave the episode a 3 star rating out of 5 and wrote, "After last week's night at the theater, Poker Face returns to an older recipe. Combine one dusty podunk town with a handful of modest, quiet lives and a dash of homicidal desperation. Let the mixture simmer for approximately one-half episode, then add the meddlesome Charlie Cale and a pinch of throaty charm." Sarah Fields of Telltale TV gave the episode a 3 star rating out of 5 and wrote, "As weaker episodes go, 'The Future of the Sport' could hardly be considered bad. It's a solid episode, for sure. It's just not quite at the level that Poker Face has delivered so far."

=== Accolades ===
TVLine named Charles Melton as an honorable mention as the "Performer of the Week" for the week of February 18, 2023, for his performance in the episode. The site wrote, "Charles Melton has mostly been stuck in the background as Riverdale's Reggie, but this week on Poker Face, he got a chance to flash some movie-star charisma, along with a sinister side. As race car driver Davis McDowell, Melton had a cocky yet undeniable charm, even winning over the ever-skeptical Charlie. But as Charlie untangled this week's complicated crime, she discovered that Davis would do just about anything to finish first on the racetrack. When she confronted him, Melton had to walk a fine line between justifying Davis' deeds and displaying real menace, and he did so with impressive ease. Riverdale may be ending soon, but based on his work here, Melton's career is just getting revved up."
