= Lino DiSalvo =

American animator, film director, writer and voice actor

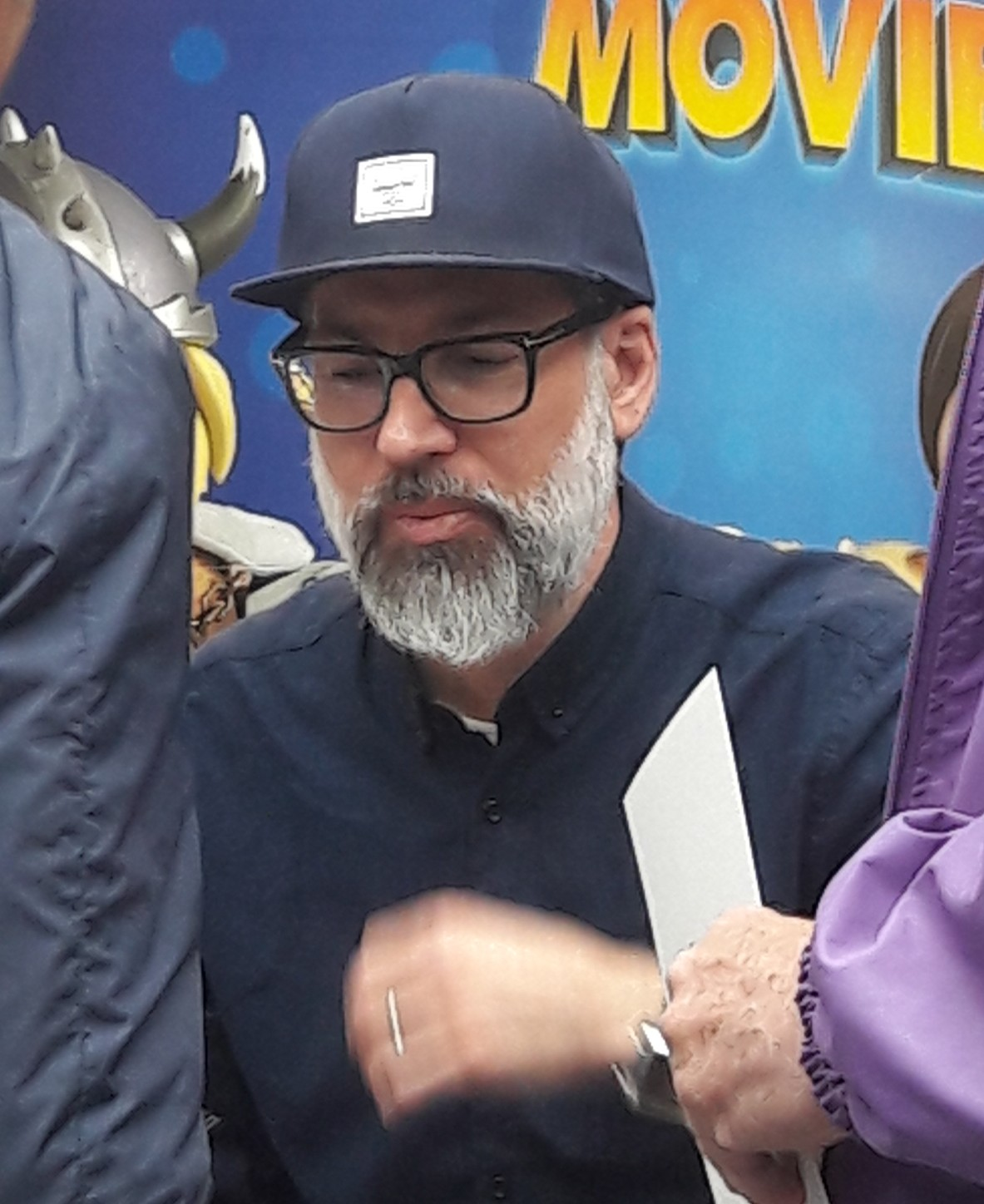
- DiSalvo in 2019
- Education: Vancouver Film School
- Occupations: Animator, film director, writer, voice actor
- Years active: 1999–present
- Spouse: Rosanna Rizzuto-DiSalvo

Lino DiSalvo is an American animator, film director, writer and voice actor.

== Biography ==
DiSalvo graduated from Vancouver Film School and joined Walt Disney Animation Studios. DiSalvo spent almost 17 years at Disney and served as Head of Animation on Frozen, supervising animator on Tangled and Bolt and animator on Meet the Robinsons, Chicken Little, 102 Dalmatians and Reign of Fire.

He served as Creative Director for Paramount Animation before joining Paris-based, ON Animation Studios as Head of Creative. He has also voiced the characters of Vinnie the pigeon in Bolt, Gristletoe Joe in Prep & Landing: Naughty vs. Nice, and Robotitron in Playmobil: The Movie.

As of 2018, DiSalvo is developing his next animated feature, The Badalisc, which is inspired by Italian folklore and draws heavily from his cultural heritage.

== Filmography ==
Year	Title	Animator	Director	Actor	Notes
1999	Inspector Gadget	Yes	No	No	
2000	102 Dalmatians	Yes	No	No	
2002	Reign of Fire	Yes	No	No	
2003	Kangaroo Jack	Yes	No	No	
2005	Chicken Little	Yes	No	No	
2007	Meet the Robinsons	Yes	No	No	
2008	Bolt	Yes	No	Yes	Supervising Animator, voice of Vinnie
2009	Prep & Landing	Yes	No	Yes	Supervising Animator, voice of Gristletoe Joe
2010	Tangled	Yes	No	No	Supervising Animator
2011	Prep & Landing: Naughty vs. Nice	Yes	No	No	Animation Supervisor
2013	Frozen	Yes	No	No	Head of Animation
2019	Playmobil: The Movie	No	Yes	Yes	Original Story, voice of Robotitron
2022	Reindeer in Here	No	Yes	Yes	Executive Producer, voice of Frankie and polar bear secretary, Nominated for a Children's & Family Emmy Award for Outstanding Animated Special
TBA	The Badalisc	No	Yes	No	Original Story
