= Julia McDermott =

American actress

- McDermott in 2026
- Education: The Juilliard School
- Occupation: Actress
- Years active: 2019-present

Julia McDermott is an American actress. For her role as Stacey in the stage play Weather Girl she was nominated for Best Actress at the 2026 Laurence Olivier Awards.

== Career ==
McDermott attended The Juilliard School. Her first project after graduating was appearing in the Brian Watkins play Epiphany by The Druid Theater Company in Ireland. In 2019, she appeared off-Broadway in Will Arbery's play Heroes of the Fourth Turning. The play was nominated for the Pulitzer Prize for Drama.

McDermott appeared on stage in the role of California weather reporter Stacey in one-woman satirical comedy play Weather Girl at the 2024 Edinburgh Fringe Festival, where it was acclaimed, securing Scotsman Fringe First, Popcorn Award, LIST Award and Lustrum Award, before going on to perform at the Soho Theatre, London. The show was written by Brian Watkins, and directed by Tyne Rafaeli. For the role she was nominated for Best Actress at the 2026 Laurence Olivier Awards.

On screen, McDermott portrayed Carolyn Bryant in American historical drama miniseries Women of the Movement on ABC in January 2022. The following year, she had a recurring role as Fiona in Hulu comedy series Up Here. In 2024, she had a guest role on CBS series Elsbeth.

In 2024, McDermott appeared in the Brian Watkins short film Diviners alongside Lewis Pullman. McDermott joined the cast of John Lee Hancock film Monsanto as well as historical sports drama The 99'ers as soccer player Brandi Chastain, in 2026.

== Filmography ==
Key
| † | Denotes works that have not yet been released |

| Year | Title | Role | Notes |
|---|---|---|---|
| 2022 | Women of the Movement | Carolyn Bryant | 5 episodes |
| 2023 | Up Here | Fiona | 3 episodes |
| 2024 | Elsbeth | Lana | 1 episode |
| 2024 | Diviners | | Short film |
| TBA | Monsanto† | TBA | |
| TBA | The 99'ers† | Brandi Chastain | |
