= Film Journal International =

American film industry trade magazine

- Front page nameplate
- Categories: Motion-picture industry
- Frequency: Monthly
- Publisher: Mediabistro Holdings
- Founded: 1934
- Final issue: 2018
- Country: United States
- Based in: New York City
- Language: English
- Website: filmjournal.com
- ISSN: 1526-9884

Film Journal International was a motion-picture industry trade magazine published by the American company Prometheus Global Media. It was a sister publication of Adweek, Billboard, The Hollywood Reporter, and other periodicals.

== History and profile ==
Launched in 1934 as The Independent (Independent Theatre Owners Association newsletter) and published monthly, the journal covered exhibition, production, and distribution, reporting both U.S. and international news, with features on industry trends, movie theater design and technology, screen advertising, and other topics. In 1946 it was renamed the Independent Film Journal, then later The Film Journal, and then in 1996 Film Journal International.

It was the official magazine of the industry conventions ShoWest, ShowEast, Cinema Expo International, and CineAsia.

In 2008, it was based at 770 Broadway, New York City, New York. Its last editor and publisher was Robert Sunshine, and the executive editor was Kevin Lally. Its film critics included Lewis Beale, Frank Lovece, Maitland McDonagh, Rebecca Pahle, David Noh, and Doris Toumarkine. Rex Roberts was the associate editor and graphic designer, and as of 2016, Sarah Sluis was the assistant editor/staff writer, a post previously held by Katey Rich.

On October 22, 2018, Film Journal International merged with Box Office Pro, effectively ending the journal.

== See also ==
- Box Office Poison (magazine article)
