= Leslie Silva =

American actress (born 1968)

- Born: April 21, 1968 (age 58)
- Education: University of Connecticut, Storrs (BFA); Juilliard School (MFA)
- Occupation: Actress
- Years active: 1995–present

Leslie Silva (born April 21, 1968) is an American actress who has had long running television roles in Odyssey 5, Providence, and Shades of Blue.

== Early life and education ==
Silva graduated from the University of Connecticut with a BFA in dramatic arts (1989) then attended the Juilliard School (1991–1995) where she earned a MFA in drama.

== Career ==
Silva began her professional acting career in 1995, in an off-Broadway production of Macbeth in Washington, D.C. She has starred in many series, most recently So Help Me Todd and Poker Face.

== Filmography ==
Year	Title	Role	Notes
1996	New York Undercover (TV series)	EMT	episode: "Sympathy for the Devil"
1997	Fools Rush In	Divorce Papers Process Server	
1997	The Cosby Show (TV series)		episode: "Shall We Dance?"
1998	Homicide: Life on the Street (TV series)	Sister Dyanne Attwood	2 episodes
1999	Providence (TV series)	Dr. Helen Reynolds	18 episodes
2000	ER (TV series)	Sonya Bassett	episode: "Viable Options"
2000	The '70s (TV movie)	Yolanda	
2000	Girlfriends (TV series)	Toni Childs	unaired pilot
2001	Gideon's Crossing (TV series)	Caitlin Reese	episode: "Hinkytown"
2002	Divine Secrets of the Ya-Ya Sisterhood	Younger Willetta	
2002–2003	Odyssey 5 (TV series)	Sarah Forbes	19 episodes
2003	CSI: Crime Scene Investigation (TV series)	The Nanny	episode: "Lucky Strike"
2003	The Agency (TV series)	FBI Special Agent Shelton	4 episodes
2004	Cold Case (TV series)	Sarah Tucker	episode: "The Letter"
2005	Star Trek: Enterprise (TV series)	Danica Erickson	episode: "Daedalus"
2006	CSI: Miami (TV series)	Felicia Hill	episode: "Deviant"
2008	Reversion	Eva	
2007–2010	Numb3rs (TV series)	M.E. Ridenhour	9 episodes
2011	Nurse Jackie (TV series)	Receptionist	episode: "Rat Falls"
2012	Person of Interest (TV series)	Nurse Mary Abbott	episode: "Baby Blue"
2013	The Good Wife (TV Series)	Elizabeth	episode: "Whack-a-Mole"
2016–2018	Shades of Blue	Gail Baker	19 episodes
2016–2022	Bull (TV series)	Judge Maya Lamkin	2 episodes
2018	The Looming Tower (TV Series)	Deb Fletcher	2 episodes
2018	Vox Lux	The Stylist	
2019	The Blacklist (TV series)	Caroline Eikendoll	episode: "Olivia Olson (No. 115)"
2019–2022	In the Dark (TV series)	Rhonda Parker	6 episodes
2020	FBI (TV series)	NSA Agent Dawson	episode: "Hard Decisions"
2022	Women of the Movement (TV series)	Ruby Hurley	4 episodes
2023	Poker Face (TV series)	Donna Owens	episode: "The Future of the Sport"
2023	So Help Me Todd (TV series)	Beverly Crest	11 episodes
2024	Babygirl	Hazel	
