= Moritz Borman =

German film producer (1955–2026)

- Born: 16 April 1955; Germany
- Died: 1 July 2026 (aged 71); Munich, Bavaria, Germany
- Occupation: Film producer
- Notable work: Terminator

Moritz Borman (16 April 1955 – 1 July 2026) was a German film producer who was known for his work on American films. With a career that spanned major studio productions as well as independent films, Borman became known as a versatile and experienced producer. He was known for his collaborations with leading international filmmakers and actors, and his involvement in a wide range of film projects across different genres. Through his long-standing career and his expertise in managing large-scale international projects, Borman became a respected figure in the film industry.

== Career ==
Borman began his career in German television as a producer and director before relocating to Los Angeles, where he received a master's degree from the American Film Institute. Initially, he produced numerous programs for European television networks and commercials for major international brands. His first feature film production was John Huston's Under the Volcano, which was nominated for two Academy Awards. From that point, he focused exclusively on feature films.

In the late 1990s, Borman founded Pacifica Film, a film financing company that invested over $300 million in numerous studio productions through German media funds he initiated. In 2000, he merged Pacifica with Intermedia Films, creating Hollywood's largest independent production and financing company, with over 250 employees, and he became its CEO. In the same year, he made the entity public on the German stock exchange, raising an additional $260 million in capital. In 2003, Borman resigned as CEO of Intermedia and returned fully to producing feature films.

He initiated and oversaw the production of a wide range of films, including large-scale studio projects and artistically ambitious indie films. His filmography included 35 Hollywood productions. Some of his most notable films were works by director and screenwriter Oliver Stone, including Snowden (2016), Savages (2012), World Trade Center (2006), Alexander (2004), and W. (2008). Other productions Borman worked on include Terminator 3: Rise of the Machines (2003), Terminator Salvation (2009), The Quiet American (2002), K-19: The Widowmaker (2002), The Wedding Planner (2001), and Nurse Betty (2000). His final film is an upcoming film titled Monsanto, which was in production at the time of his death. As of 2023, his films had grossed nearly $2 billion on the worldwide box office.

== Commitment and memberships ==
Borman was an active member of the Academy of Motion Picture Arts and Sciences, which award the Academy Awards each year.

He had also served as chairman of the Tony Fitzjohn/George Adamson African Wildlife Preservation Trust, which established the Mkomazi Game Reserve in Tanzania and has supported Kenya's Kora National Park. Among the trust's notable supporters are actress Ali MacGraw and Prince Harry, Duke of Sussex.

== Death ==
Borman died in Munich, Bavaria, on 1 July 2026, at the age of 71.

== Filmography ==
Year	Film	Notes
1984	Under the Volcano	
1985	The Lightship	
1989	Homer and Eddie	
2000	The Crow: Salvation	Executive producer
2000	Where the Money Is	Executive producer
2000	Nurse Betty	Executive producer
2001	The Wedding Planner	Executive producer
2001	Blow Dry	Executive producer
2002	K-19: The Widowmaker	Executive producer
2002	The Quiet American	Executive producer
2002	Dark Blue	Executive producer
2003	National Security	Executive producer
2003	The Life of David Gale	Executive producer
2003	Basic	Executive producer
2003	Terminator 3: Rise of the Machines	Executive producer
2004	If Only	Executive producer
2004	Welcome to Mooseport	Executive producer
2004	Mindhunters	Executive producer
2004	Suspect Zero	Executive producer
2004	Alexander	
2006	Basic Instinct 2	Executive producer
2006	World Trade Center	
2008	W.	
2009	Terminator Salvation	
2010	The Nutcracker in 3D	Executive producer
2012	Savages	
2014	Escobar: Paradise Lost	Executive producer
2015	The Little Prince	Executive producer
2016	Snowden	
2019	Playmobil: The Movie	
TBA	Monsanto	Posthumous release
