= Odyssey 5 =

Canadian science fiction TV series

- Genre: Science fiction Time travel
- Created by: Manny Coto
- Starring: Peter Weller; Christopher Gorham; Sebastian Roché; Leslie Silva; Tamara Craig Thomas
- Country of origin: Canada
- Original language: English
- No. of seasons: 1
- No. of episodes: 19

Production
- Running time: 44 mins 92 mins (Pilot)
- Production companies: Manny Coto Productions; Columbia TriStar Domestic Television (Note: Later known as Sony Pictures Television in September 2002.); Showtime Networks

Original release
- Network: Space; Showtime
- Release: June 21 – October 15, 2002

Odyssey 5 is a Canadian science fiction television series, which was shown in 2002 on Space in Canada and on Showtime in the United States. The premise involves five space travelers who witness the destruction of the Earth; they are given the opportunity to travel to the past to identify and prevent the cataclysm.

Odyssey 5 was created by Manny Coto, who was a writer and executive producer during the series' short-lived run. Through his website and in interviews, Coto expressed his interest in reviving the series, but it ultimately never materialized after his death on July 9, 2023.

The series was produced in Toronto, Ontario, Canada.

== Plot ==
The story follows six people (four astronauts, a scientist and a television news reporter) on a routine flight of the space shuttle Odyssey on 7 August 2007. During the flight, the Earth rapidly dissolves into a fiery ball and implodes. Control of the Odyssey is momentarily lost and one astronaut is killed. The remaining five crew members resign themselves to death, but an inorganic being called the Seeker rescues them. The Seeker tells them that 50 other worlds have been destroyed in the same way as Earth and the Seeker has always arrived too late to observe it. This is the first time he has found survivors. He offers to send them five years into the past (to 2002, the year the series was shown) so that they can prevent the disaster. He sends only their consciousnesses back because physical time travel is impossible. The mission commander learns a codeword associated with the disaster: Leviathan.

The villains are a race of disembodied artificial intelligences known as "Sentients". They are trying to learn about humanity through artificial humanoid robots called "Synthetics", which are nearly indistinguishable from humans. Another group of Synthetics is discovered to be from Mars. In the original timeline, a previous race of Synthetics created by humanity was destroyed by a secret US government agency. Whether the destruction of the Earth was retaliation for this act by the Sentients is never revealed.

While they search for the truth, the team must also revisit their pasts while retaining past knowledge of what is to come. Reporter Sarah Forbes tries to save her five-year-old son, who died of cancer in the original timeline. Her efforts in this direction alienate her husband, who leaves her and takes their son with him. Astronaut Angela Perry must deal with the knowledge that her father is a corrupt U.S. senator whose malfeasance destroyed her family in the original timeline. Commander Chuck Taggart must try to keep his family together. His son, Neil, a computer technician on the Odyssey, must adjust to being 17 again when he was a poor student who had not yet discovered his talents. Pessimistic scientist Kurt Mendel believes they cannot change history and spends his time indulging every desire.

The series characters are not friends and frequently disagree. The humanity of the team is shown through arguments, jokes and their attempts to maintain social lives and help the world with their limited knowledge of the future.

Many of the show's plotlines involve technologies like AI, nanotechnology and neuroimaging.

A recurring theme is that the actions of the group may hasten the cataclysm they are trying to avoid or alter history in undesirable ways. A character who was supposed to live until 2007 dies in the first episode after helping the group. In one episode, Sarah and Angela protect a girl they know will be kidnapped. Although this prevents that individual's kidnapping, the kidnapper takes a different child. Kurt makes a large bet on a football game whose outcome is already known to him, but the pressure of knowing has a negative effect on a player instrumental in winning the game, and the team loses.

== Cast ==
- Peter Weller – Chuck Taggart, commander of the Odyssey mission and leader of the group when they jump back to the past.
- Sebastian Roché – Kurt Mendel, Nobel Prize-winning behavioral geneticist whose atheistic outlook and hedonistic tendencies often bring comic relief to the story.
- Christopher Gorham – Neil Taggart, Chuck's son. NASA's youngest astronaut at age 22, he succeeded where his older brother, Marc, had failed. He constantly has to deal with the struggles of growing up again and the repercussions that came with his high school delinquencies.
- Tamara Marie Watson – Angela Perry, an astronaut who was rendered unconscious when the Earth imploded, waking up disoriented five years in the past, in her MMU about to burn up in the atmosphere. Her issues following their return have a repercussion on her career, altering her future.
- Leslie Silva – Sarah Forbes, a reporter who tagged along with the Odyssey for a report, finding herself back before her son died from cancer and threatening to tear her family apart through her determination not to let him die again.
- Gina Clayton – Paige Taggart, the matriarch who struggles to believe that her husband and son are time travelers.

== Episodes ==
No.	Title	Directed by	Written by	Original release date
1	"Pilot"	David Carson	Manny Coto	21 June 2002
On 7 August 2007, five astronauts are the sole survivors of an inexplicable apocalyptic event that caused Earth to suddenly explode. An alien AI construct that is investigating similar incidents arrives and sends them five years into the past to learn how to stop the cataclysm.
2	"Shatterer"	Randy Zisk	Manny Coto	28 June 2002
The crew try to prevent the suicide of a notable mathematician who developed sentient AI programs. Sarah and Angela investigate a suspicious gene therapy treatment. Neil returns to high school and meets his now underage girlfriend.
3	"Astronaut Dreams"	David Straiton	Manny Coto	5 July 2002
Fearing it might destroy Earth, Chuck plans to sabotage NASA's new satellite project Bright Sky. Sarah tries to prevent a crime that happened in the original timeline but now it happens differently. Kurt finds a way to detect synthetics.
4	"Time Out of Mind"	David Straiton	Tracy Tormé	12 July 2002
The Odyssey crew members begin to lose their memories of the future and their present mission to save the Earth.
5	"Symbiosis"	Randy Zisk	Lindsay Sturman	19 July 2002
Someone tells the crew how to find the missing deaf niece of a scientist who worked on mind-control technology. Sarah meets the man she married in the original timeline. Marc passes NASA's first test. Angela deals with her family.
6	"The Choices We Make"	Peter Weller	Tim Foreman	26 July 2002
The crew has visions of people asking if they believe that anything is possible. This leads to Chuck and Neil confronting a painful memory, Sarah dealing with her son's cancer and Kurt and Angela seeing the future they could have had.
7	"Rapture"	Stephen Williams	Edithe Swensen	2 August 2002
Neil's classmate hooks Neil's girlfriend and some other kids on a strange psychoactive drug that seemingly makes people smarter. Chuck learns that NASA's new flight director is part of "The Cadre" cabal. Angela's psychological evaluation is up.
8	"L.D.U. 7"	George Mendeluk	Tommy Thompson	9 August 2002
Chuck, Kurt and Sarah infiltrate a private high-tech prison called Lock Down Unit 7 to find the convict who claims that the people he killed were synthetic replicas of his parents. Neil's brother is having an identity crisis.
9	"Flux"	Ken Girotti	Edithe Swensen	16 August 2002
Chuck is infected by a synthetic and starts turning into one. The other synthetics want him to join them. Sarah tries to have joint custody of her son after his father takes him away. Marc is tested by his supervisor.
10	"Kitten"	Milan Cheylov	Lindsay Sturman	23 August 2002
Neil is being stalked by Kit-10, an insane all-powerful female AI. Sarah loses her visitation rights. Angela is on a new joint space mission with a friendly Russian astronaut, Tatianna Kosviskova. Kit-10 uses them as hostages.
11	"Dark at the End of the Tunnel"	Peter Weller	Tracy Tormé	30 August 2002
As Texas is plagued by a heatwave that did not exist in the original timeline, Kurt is led to a town that is waiting for the arrival of God.
12	"The Trouble with Harry"	Stephen Williams	Alan Brennert	6 September 2002
The Odyssey 5 team forms an alliance with a friendly "geeky" sentient, who calls himself Harry Mudd and has a great lust for life, to stop a powerful insane female sentient, who plans to destroy Earth.
13	"Skin"	Bryan Spicer	Lindsay Sturman & Edithe Swensen	13 September 2002
A man-made artificially intelligent synthetic organism that imitates human skin and can attach itself to a person and take them over, jumps from one person to another in an attempt to kill Angela's father. Chuck's worst nightmare comes true.
14	"Begotten"	Terry Ingram	Lindsay Sturman & Edithe Swensen	1 October 2002
Chuck takes a trip down memory lane with a young female hitchhiker. Kurt grows a human-synthetic hybrid. It attacks him and escapes. He suffers a mental breakdown and becomes convinced that the crew has been replaced by synthetics.
15	"Vanishing Point"	David Winkler	Melinda M. Snodgrass	1 October 2002
Chuck suddenly wakes up in a hospital with his dead wife by his side. She claims that it was he who almost died, not she. Sarah and Angela investigate a mass grave tied to a Transhumanist group. Neil loses his virginity - again.
16	"Follow the Leader"	George Mendeluk	Jonathan Glassner	8 October 2002
A group of children who all visit the same computer laboratory receive a strange signal over the Internet and become obsessed with it to the point of killing anyone who tries to interfere. Chuck's estranged sister helps him deal with his grief.
17	"Half-Life"	Stephen Williams	Lindsay Sturman & Edithe Swensen	8 October 2002
Angela believes that the ghost of her dead ex-boyfriend, a pilot who was killed in an experiment, is haunting her. Sarah starts dating a colleague she ended up marrying in the original timeline.
18	"Rage"	Ken Girotti	Michael Cassutt	15 October 2002
Dr. Chandra dies in suspicious circumstances and leaves the crew a disk that the synthetics want. The crew investigates what caused a strange riot in a peaceful suburban neighborhood in the original timeline and tries to prevent it.
19	"Fossil"	Peter Weller	Manny Coto & Jonathan Glassner	15 October 2002
Chuck analyzes a strange Moon rock concealed by NASA and finally finds some answers. Angela is kidnapped. A police officer falsely suspects Kurt. Sarah's wish comes true - as well as her worst nightmare. The show ends on an unresolved cliffhanger.

== Broadcast history ==
In the United States, the initial run of the series ran from 28 June 2002 (Episode 2) to 27 February 2003 (Episode 19) on Showtime. Episode 1 (the pilot) is listed as a two-parter. It was aired on 2 October 2002, after Episode 13. The series made a full run of all 19 episodes in the United Kingdom on Sky One and on Sci Fi Channel and in Canada. In 2004, the series appeared in Finland on Nelonen and thus could also be seen in Estonia, and in June 2004 it was premiered in Germany on Sat.1. In 2005, it was shown in the Netherlands on NET 5 after midnight. In addition, Odyssey 5 is being or has been shown on RTL Klub in Hungary, and premiered in Australia on the Sci Fi Channel in December 2006 and on channel TV6 in Lithuania in 2008.

It has been shown on Cadena 3 (channel 28) in Mexico, the Sci Fi Channel in the United States, SIC Radical in Portugal, Mega Channel in Greece, TV 3 in Estonia, extreme TV in Spain and AXN Sci Fi in Romania, Poland and Bulgaria. It was also shown on Channel 3 in Israel.

== Home media ==
The series was released by Sony Pictures Home Entertainment as a complete box set (region 1) in April 2006 and in region 2 territories on 26 June 2006. As an extra feature, the DVD set has a commentary track on the pilot episode by Manny Coto and Peter Weller.
