= CineEurope =

European trade show and convention

- CineEurope logo
- Status: Active
- Genre: Cinema industry
- Dates: Opening: 16 June 2025; Closing: 19 June 2025
- Venue: Centro de Convenciones Internacional de Barcelona
- Locations: Barcelona, Catalonia, Spain
- Country: Spain
- Inaugurated: 1992
- Most recent: 2025
- Organizer: Prometheus Global Media Film Group Expo; International Union of Cinemas
- Website: www.filmexpos.com/cineeurope

CineEurope (formerly Cinema Expo International) is the longest running European trade show and convention for the cinema industry. Organised by Prometheus Global Media Film Group Expo and jointly since 2015 with the International Union of Cinemas (UNIC), CineEurope combines the official annual convention of the latter trade association representing cinema exhibitors and their national associations, and a trade show featuring product and film presentations, and screenings of select feature films.

== History ==
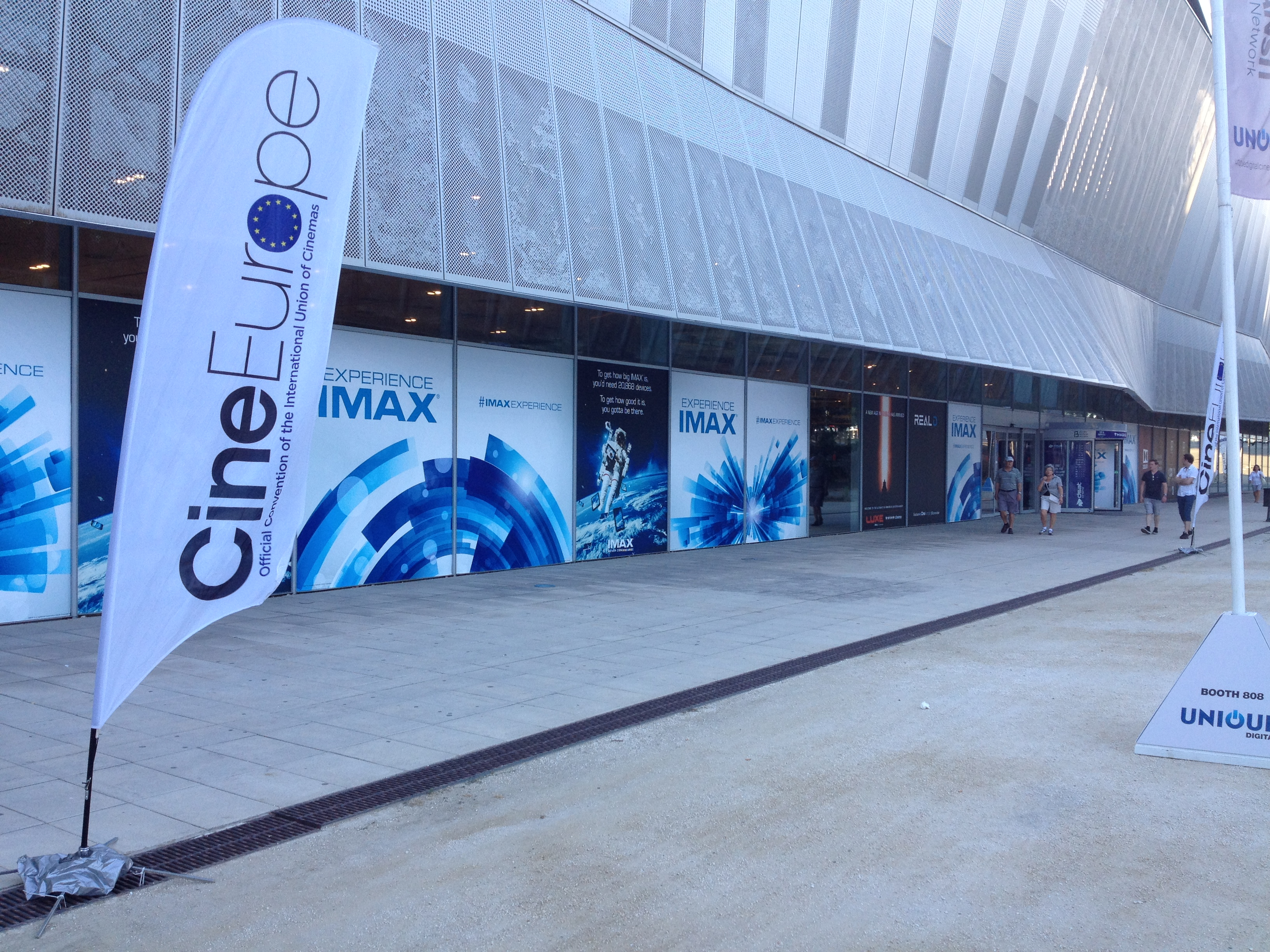
Entrance to the Centro de Convenciones Internacional de Barcelona, Spain at the 2015 CineEurope

- 1st Cinema Expo International, 29 June–2 July 1992, Brussels International Conference Centre, Belgium. Among the features getting a full exhibition screening was Alien 3 (20th Century Fox).
- 2nd Cinema Expo International, 28 June–1 July 1993, Brussels International Conference Centre, Belgium. Full length exhibition screening of Jurassic Park (Universal Pictures), In the Line of Fire (Columbia Pictures), What's Love Got to Do with It (Buena Vista Pictures), Dave (Warner Bros.), and Cliffhanger (TriStar Pictures). A Lifetime Achievement Award was given to Steven Spielberg.
- 3rd Cinema Expo International, 27–30 June 1994, Brussels International Conference Centre, Belgium.
- 4th Cinema Expo International, 26–29 June 1995, Amsterdam RAI Exhibition and Convention Centre, Netherlands. Full length exhibition screening of Congo (Paramount Pictures), Species (Metro-Goldwyn-Mayer), Johnny Mnemonic (TriStar), French Kiss and Nine Months (20th Century Fox), Batman Forever (Warner Bros.), Crimson Tide and Pocahontas (Buena Vista), and Apollo 13 (Universal). A Lifetime Achievement Award was given to Sir Richard Attenborough.
- 5th Cinema Expo International, 24–27 June 1996, Amsterdam RAI Exhibition and Convention Centre, Netherlands. Full length exhibition screening of Multiplicity (Columbia Pictures/TriStar), Mission: Impossible (Paramount Pictures), Fled (Metro-Goldwyn-Mayer), Courage Under Fire (20th Century Fox), Eraser (Warner Bros.), The Rock and The Hunchback of Notre Dame (Buena Vista), and Twister (Universal). A Lifetime Achievement Award was given to Arnold Kopelson.
- 6th Cinema Expo International, 29 June–2 July 1997, Amsterdam RAI Exhibition and Convention Centre, Netherlands. Full length exhibition screenings included Volcano and Speed 2: Cruise Control (20th Century Fox), Batman & Robin (Warner Bros.), Face/Off (Buena Vista), and The Lost World: Jurassic Park (Universal).
- 7th Cinema Expo International, 15–18 June 1998, Amsterdam RAI Exhibition and Convention Centre, Netherlands. Full length exhibition screening of Life Is Beautiful and The Mighty (Miramax), Godzilla and The Mask of Zorro (TriStar), The X-Files and There's Something About Mary (20th Century Fox), Mulan (Buena Vista), and Out of Sight (Universal). A Lifetime Achievement Award was given to Vittorio Cecchi Gori.
- 8th Cinema Expo International, 21–24 June 1999, Amsterdam RAI Exhibition and Convention Centre, Netherlands. A Lifetime Achievement Award was given to Alan Parker.
- 9th Cinema Expo International, 26–29 June 2000, Amsterdam RAI Exhibition and Convention Centre, Netherlands. A Lifetime Achievement Award was given to Dino De Laurentiis.
- 10th Cinema Expo International, 25–28 June 2001, Amsterdam RAI Exhibition and Convention Centre, Netherlands.
- 11th Cinema Expo International, 24–28 June 2002, Amsterdam RAI Exhibition and Convention Centre, Netherlands.
- 12th Cinema Expo International, 23–26 June 2003, Amsterdam RAI Exhibition and Convention Centre, Netherlands.
- 13th Cinema Expo International, 21–24 June 2004, Amsterdam RAI Exhibition and Convention Centre, Netherlands.
- 14th Cinema Expo International, 27–30 June 2005, Amsterdam RAI Exhibition and Convention Centre, Netherlands.
- 15th Cinema Expo International, 26–29 June 2006, Amsterdam RAI Exhibition and Convention Centre, Netherlands.
- 16th Cinema Expo International, 25–28 June 2007, Amsterdam RAI Exhibition and Convention Centre, Netherlands. Full length exhibition screening of Transformers (Paramount), Surf's Up (Columbia), Hairspray (New Line Cinema), No Reservations (Warner), Die Hard 4.0 (20th Century Fox), Ratatouille (Buena Vista), I Now Pronounce You Chuck and Larry (Universal), and an IMAX 3D screening of Harry Potter and the Order of the Phoenix.
- 17th Cinema Expo International, 23–26 June 2008, Amsterdam RAI Exhibition and Convention Centre, Netherlands.
- 18th Cinema Expo International, 22–25 June 2009, Amsterdam RAI Exhibition and Convention Centre, Netherlands. Full length exhibition screenings of Up and The Ugly Truth.
- 19th Cinema Expo International, 24–28 June 2010, Amsterdam RAI Exhibition and Convention Centre, Netherlands.
- 20th CineEurope, 27–30 June 2011, Amsterdam RAI Exhibition and Convention Centre, Netherlands.
- 21st CineEurope, 18–21 June 2012, Centro de Convenciones Internacional de Barcelona, Spain.
- 22nd CineEurope, 24–27 June 2013, Centro de Convenciones Internacional de Barcelona, Spain.
- 23rd CineEurope, 16–19 June 2014, Centro de Convenciones Internacional de Barcelona, Spain. Full length exhibition screening of The Hundred-Foot Journey.
- 24th CineEurope, 22–25 June 2015, Centro de Convenciones Internacional de Barcelona, Spain. Full length exhibition screenings of Ant-Man, Vacation, Sicario, Everest and Terminator Genysis.
