= Ira Eaker (publisher) =

American publisher

Ira Eaker (c. 1921 – June 26, 2002) was an American publisher, who was the co-founder of Backstage, with Allen Zwerdling a weekly trade newspaper that was aimed at the theater, television and movie industries that is considered a "must-read" for actors and other professionals looking for jobs and industry information.

== Biography ==
Eaker grew up in New York City and attended public school before serving in the United States Army during World War II. After completing his military service, Eaker attended the City College of New York, where he was awarded a degree in business.

He had worked at a number of different publications while he was attending college and was hired 1948 as the advertising manager of Show Business, a trade paper for the theatrical industry. After a dozen years at Show Business, he left the paper together with co-worker Allen Zwerdling to establish Back Stage. The publication was established in 1960 in a small office on West 46th Street in Manhattan, producing a print run of 10,000 copies. From its inception, Back Stage focused on a combination of details about theatrical and movie productions that would be hiring actors and ancillary workers, articles aimed at the aspiring actor, and reviews of new performances for the general public. With the growth of the television industry in New York City during the 1960s, the publication's circulation grew, reaching 32,000 by the time of Eaker's death. Eaker opened a Los Angeles office in 1975 and expanded coverage for Back Stage to Boston, Chicago and Florida.

Back Stage was sold in 1986 to Billboard Publications, with Eaker staying on as an adviser until his retirement in 1989.

== Death ==
Eaker died at age 80 on June 26, 2002, at a hospital in Tamarac, Florida. He was survived by his wife, a son and daughter, sister and two grandchildren. His daughter Sherry Eaker was editor-in-chief of Back Stage at the time of his death, and was an editor at large as of 2009.

== External resources ==
- NY Theatre Wire Obit for Back Stage Co-Founder Ira Eaker
