= Zwerling =

Zwerling is a surname. Notable people with the surname include:

- Darrell Zwerling (1928-2014), American actor
- Harriet Sohmers Zwerling (1928–2019), American writer and artist's model
- Jeff Corey (born Arthur Zwerling; 1914–2002), American stage and screen actor
- Lisa Zwerling, American physician, television writer and producer
- Yetta Zwerling (died 1982), Yiddish actress

== See also ==
- 20529 Zwerling main-belt asteroid
