= Adam Eaker =

American art historian and curator (born 1984)

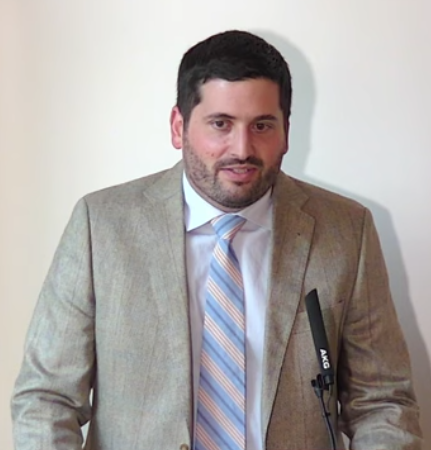
- Speaking at the Paul Mellon Centre in 2024
- Born: 1984 (age 41–42)
- Education: Yale University, Columbia University
- Occupations: curator, art historian, professor

Adam Eaker (born 1984) is an American art historian and curator who serves as the Howard Marks Curator in the Department of European Paintings at The Metropolitan Museum of Art in New York City. His work focuses on early modern European painting, especially Dutch, Flemish, and British art.

== Education ==
Eaker received his PhD from Columbia University in 2016, specializing in British painting and the work of Anthony van Dyck in England. His dissertation was supervised by David Freedberg. His doctoral research on Van Dyck and English portraiture informed later publications and curatorial projects on the artist.

== Career ==
=== Frick Collection ===
Earlier in his career, Eaker was a fellow at the Rubenianum Research Institute for Flemish Art in Antwerp. He later served as an Anne L. Poulet Curatorial Fellow and guest curator at the Frick Collection, where his work centered on Northern European painting and the history of collecting.

At the Frick, Eaker curated an exhibition organized around the six paintings by Van Dyck in the museum's collection. His writing on the artist has examined Van Dyck's Genoese portraits, his later role in English portraiture, and the critical reception of his work.

=== Metropolitan Museum of Art ===
In 2016, Eaker joined The Metropolitan Museum of Art as a curator in the Department of European Paintings. At the Met, his work has included research, exhibition planning, acquisitions, and the presentation of Dutch and Flemish paintings during gallery renovations. He has also lectured on British portraiture and Flemish painting in the museum's collection.

His curatorial work at the Met has included projects connected to early modern British and Northern European painting. In 2022, he contributed to the museum's exhibition on Tudor portraiture, which examined sixteenth-century English painting in relation to dynastic image-making, court culture, and later ideas of monarchy.

Eaker has also been involved in acquisitions for the museum, including Francesco Renaldi's eighteenth-century portrait of a Mughal woman seated in an interior, a work previously held in a private collection and acquired from Sotheby's in London.

Eaker's research has also addressed the work of Gesina ter Borch, the seventeenth-century Dutch watercolorist and draftswoman. In 2024, he published Gesina ter Borch, which is the first major biographical account of the artist.

=== Professional affiliations and teaching ===
Eaker is a member of CODART, the international network of curators of Dutch and Flemish art. Since July 2023, he has served as seventeenth-century Flemish area editor for the reviews section of the Journal of Historians of Netherlandish Art.

In addition to his museum work, Eaker teaches art history as an adjunct associate lecturer at Barnard College.

== Books ==
- Van Dyck, with Stijn Alsteens (Frick Collection, 2016)
- Van Dyck and the Making of English Portraiture (Paul Mellon Centre for Studies in British Art, 2022)
- Gesina Ter Borch (Getty Publications, 2024)

== Exhibitions ==
Eaker has organized and curated several notable exhibitions, also authoring their publications, including:

- Van Dyck: The Anatomy of Portraiture (2016)
- In Praise of Painting: Dutch Masterpieces at the Met
- The Tudors: Art and Majesty in Renaissance England (2022–2023)

== Personal life ==
He is married to American flutist Brandon Patrick George.
