= Prometheus Global Media =

New York City-based publishing group

- Formerly: e5 Global Media
- Company type: Subsidiary
- Industry: Digital media, trade publications
- Predecessor: Nielsen Business Media
- Fate: Spin out to Eldridge Industries
- Headquarters: New York City, New York, United States
- Area served: Worldwide
- Key people: Ross Levinsohn (CEO)
- Brands: 279
- Services: 786
- Website: prometheusgm.com

Prometheus Global Media was a New York City–based B2B media company. The company was formed in December 2009, when Nielsen Company sold its entertainment and media division to a private equity-backed group led by Pluribus Capital Management and Guggenheim Partners. Guggenheim acquired Pluribus's stake in the company in January 2013, giving it full ownership under the division of Guggenheim Digital Media.

The company owned and operated a number of major entertainment industry trade publications and their associated digital properties, including Adweek, Backstage, Billboard, Film Journal International, and The Hollywood Reporter.

On December 17, 2015, it was announced that Guggenheim would spin out its media properties to a group led by former executive Todd Boehly, known as Eldridge Industries.

== History ==
=== Founding ===
On December 10, 2009, the Nielsen Company announced that it would sell its Business Media division, which included brands such as Adweek, Billboard, and The Hollywood Reporter, to a new company known as e5 Global Media; a joint venture between Guggenheim Partners and Pluribus Capital Management—a company led by James Finkelstein, Matthew Doull, and George Green. Two Nielsen properties, Editor & Publisher, and Kirkus Reviews, were not included in the sale, and were to be shut down. Editor & Publisher would instead be sold to the Duncan McIntosh Company, and Kirkus Reviews would be sold to Herbert Simon. The company's first CEO was Richard Beckman, previously an executive and publisher at Condé Nast and Fairchild Publications, and former publisher of magazines GQ and Vogue. Beckman's career suffered a setback in 1999 following "some inappropriate behavior" resulting in injuries to Vogue's West Coast advertising director Carol Matthews, while Beckman was Matthews' publisher at Condé Nast.

Beckman's first major move was a re-launch of The Hollywood Reporter; with the hiring of Janice Min, formerly of Us Weekly, as editorial director, THR replaced its daily print publication with a weekly magazine, and performed a significant redesign to its website with an increased focus on breaking scoops. The new format was meant to compete against up-and-coming blogs focusing on industry news, such as Deadline Hollywood and TheWrap, along with its then-struggling rival Variety. The changes had a significant impact on the publication's performance: by 2013, ad sales were up more than 50%, while traffic to the magazine's website had grown by 800%. In October 2010, the company was renamed Prometheus Global Media; named after the Greek mythological figure, Beckman stated in an internal memo that the new name would "[carry] more weight and gravitas in the marketplace."

=== Re-organization and acquisition ===
In late 2011, Prometheus went through a number of cost-cutting measures. In August 2011, Backstage was sold to a group of investors led by John Amato in a transaction funded by Guggenheim, and the following month, Prometheus laid off the staff responsible for the Hollywood Creative Directory and announced it had sold the publication.

In January 2013, Guggenheim Partners acquired the stake in Prometheus owned by Pluribus Capital, giving it full ownership; following the acquisition, former Yahoo! executive Ross Levinsohn was named as CEO of the new Guggenheim Digital Media division, which would oversee Prometheus and other digital assets for Guggenheim companies (such as Dick Clark Productions). In April 2013, Guggenheim re-acquired Backstage (which had also acquired Sonicbids, a platform for allowing musicians to book gigs online) and made its CEO John Amato president of the Billboard Group—a new group consisting of Billboard, Backstage, and Sonicbids.

In a January 2014 restructuring, Levinsohn was shifted to a business development role and no longer directly manages the Prometheus properties. Additionally, the company was split into two operating groups; an Entertainment Group was formed by merging The Hollywood Reporter into the Billboard Group, with Janice Min becoming co-president and chief creative officer of the group alongside Amato. The remaining properties, consisting of Adweek and Film Expo Group, are led by Jeff Wilbur.

On May 29, 2014, Prometheus announced it would acquire the publishing assets of Mediabistro—a network of websites focusing on various aspects of the mass media industry—which includes the media job listing site Mediabistro and its network of blogs such as AgencySpy, FishbowlNY, Lost Remote and TVNewser—for $8 million. The acquisition did not include Mediabistro's expo business, which were retained under the name Mecklermedia. On January 13, 2015, Adweek and Film Expo Group were merged into Mediabistro to form a new Prometheus subsidiary, Mediabistro Holdings. At the same time, its blogs were re-launched under the new "Adweek Blog Network" banner, and all of Mediabistro's social media-oriented blogs were merged into SocialTimes.

In March 2015, Guggenheim Partners reported that its president Todd Boehly was exploring the possibility of forming his own company. A representative stated that such a company would "likely be harmonious with Guggenheim, especially since Todd's role for some time has been strategic and transaction-oriented, rather than working in or managing any of our day-to-day businesses." On December 17, 2015, in response to losses across Guggenheim Partners, the company announced that it would spin out its media properties to a group led by Boehly, including the Hollywood Reporter-Billboard Media Group, Mediabistro, and Dick Clark Productions, all under their existing leadership. The resultant company is known as Eldridge Industries.

== See also ==
- Penske Media Corporation
