= Allen Zwerdling =

American journalist

- Born: Allen Zwerdling; October 12, 1922; Brooklyn, New York, US
- Died: January 12, 2009 (aged 86); Rosendale, New York, US
- Occupation: Journalist

Allen Zwerdling (October 12, 1922 – January 12, 2009) was an American journalist who was co-founder of Backstage, the "casting bible" for theater performers.

== Biography ==
Zwerdling was born on October 12, 1922, in Brooklyn, New York, and performed with the Players Guild of Manhattan from 1936 to 1941. before enlisting in the Army Air Force. In the Army during World War II, Zwerdling directed plays and edited a military newspaper. Following his military service, he established the American Players Theater in Zurich, Switzerland and became director of the Kansas City Resident Theater.

After returning to New York City in 1948, he was hired by Show Business as an editor. Ira Eaker was the advertising manager for the publication and the two developed a vision for a publication listing casting notices. The two approached The Village Voice with the idea of adding a section to that paper listing notices, but were rejected.

They went out on their own and started Back Stage in 1960 with a run of ten thousand copies per week, reaching a peak circulation of 32,000. The companion Back Stage West was established in 1994 to reach Los Angeles-area readers and has 24,000 readers. The Backstage.com web site has 20,000 paid subscribers. despite the seemingly small circulation numbers, the various versions of Back Stage are often passed on between actors and others in related professions looking for work and information about the industry.

Back Stage was sold to Billboard Publications in 1986. His partner, Ira Eaker, died in 2002.

Zwerdling died at age 86 on January 12, 2009, at his home in Rosendale, New York, where he had retired to a farm there after selling Back Stage. He had been married to Shirley M. Zwerdling who died a month before him. He was survived by two daughters, a son and a grandson.
