= Show Business (magazine) =

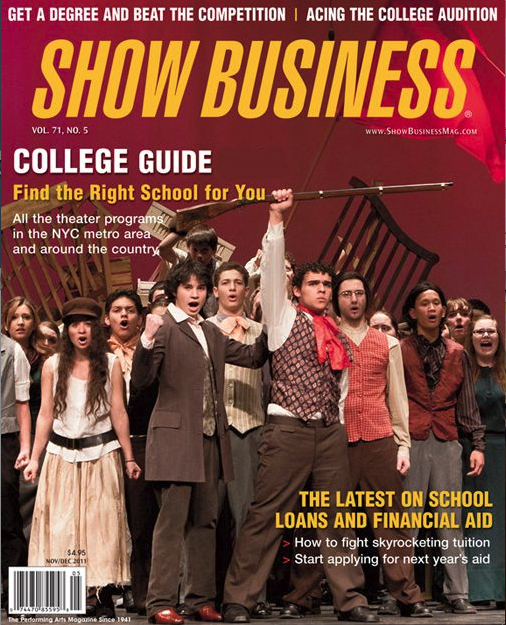
- Categories: Performing Arts Magazine
- Frequency: Monthly
- Publisher: David Pearlstein
- Founded: 1941
- Country: United States
- Based in: New York City
- Language: English
- Website: www.showbusinessweekly.com

Show Business is a performing arts magazine. Its mission is to help guide aspiring actors toward a successful career in the performing arts. Show Business content includes casting calls and audition notices as well as theater-related news and information. In addition, the print publication and website publishes contact information for talent agents, managers, and casting directors.

== History ==
Show Business was first published in 1941 when it was launched by Leo Shull as a broadsheet newspaper featuring auditions and casting calls for Broadway shows and other theatrical productions in New York City.

Young actors, singers and dancers looking for work on stage and screen would seek out the newspaper for its exclusive content of jobs and casting information, which was difficult to come by at the time. The advent of a casting publication as a means of bringing job information directly to actors was a boon to performers trying to break into the business.

In the early years of Show Business, actors such as Lauren Bacall and Kirk Douglas would help distribute copies of the publication by selling them at Sardi's and other establishments in the theater district. The operation grew to include several other publications, including resource directories for theaters, agents, managers, and producers.

Rita Hassan was a prominent theatre critic for the magazine during the 1950s and 1960s. In 1960, Mayor Robert Wagner issued an official proclamation that declared April 25 - May 2 "Show Business Week" in New York City:

"Through this theatrical publication, untold thousands of aspiring artists, young men and women who have adopted the theater as a profession, have been aided and guided in a realistic approach to this media."

In 1960, Show Business employees Allen Zwerdling and Ira Eaker left the publication to start a rival casting newspaper Backstage.

Show Business ceased publication in 1991. Eight years later, New York City entrepreneur and publisher David Pearlstein restarted the newspaper. He rebranded it and segmented the publication to reach a younger and more contemporary audience. Pearlstein expanded Show Business by adding new sections to the paper, creating live events and producing its first website: www.showbusinessweekly.com

== In pop culture ==
Alan Parker's 1980 film Fame, which follows students of New York's High School of Performing Arts, features characters reading Show Business.

In her autobiography By Myself, Lauren Bacall credits Show Business with helping her early career. As an aspiring actress, she also sold copies in front of Walgreens drug store on 7th Avenue and 44th St. in Times Square.

Gossip columnist Cindy Adams worked for Show Business early in her career.
