= Bettmann Archive =

Photo collection owned by Getty Images

Coordinates: 41.111°N 79.887°W

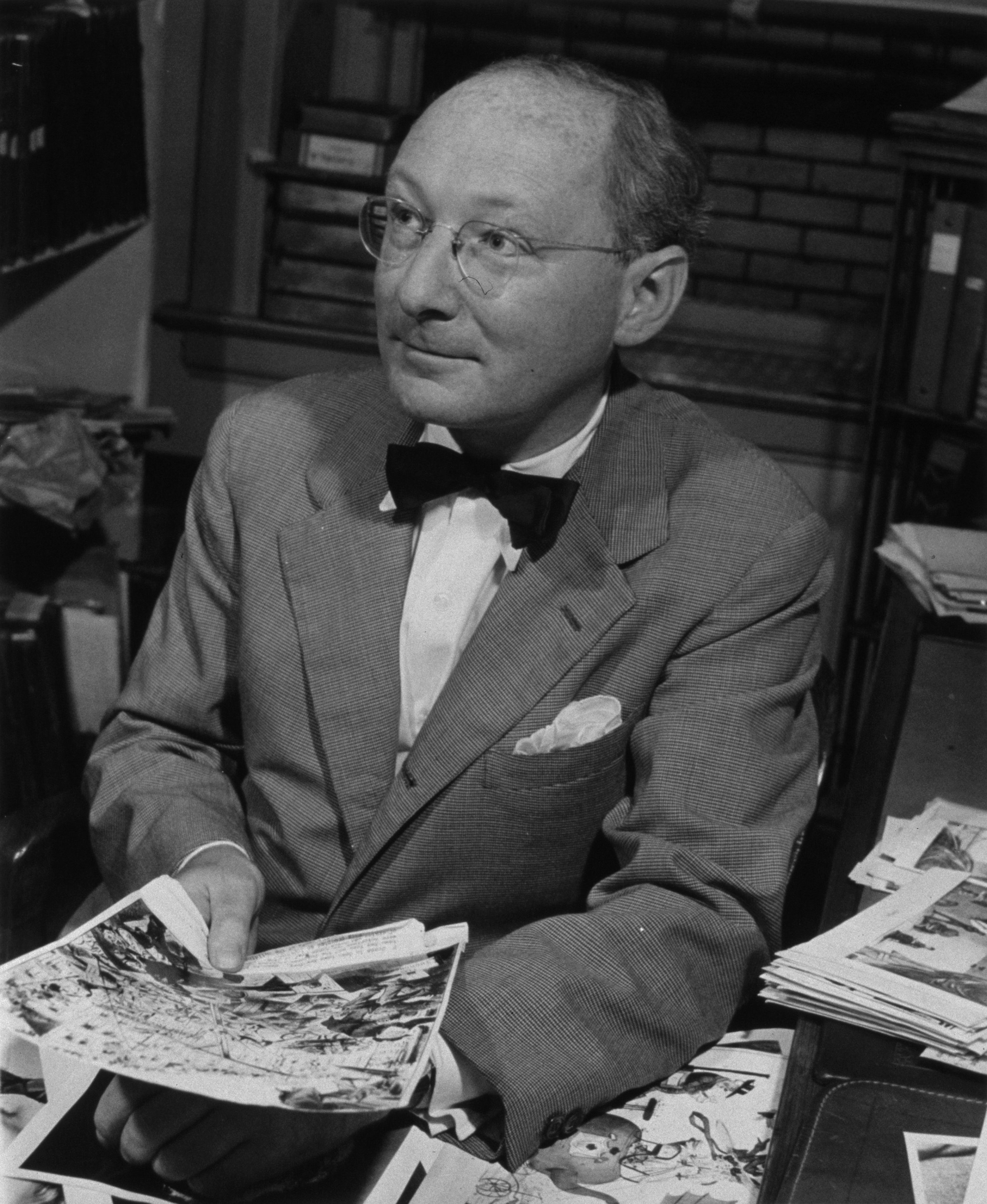
Otto Bettmann, founder of the Bettmann Archive (1947)

The Bettmann Archive is a collection of over 18 million photographs and images, some going back to the United States Civil War and including some of the best known U.S. historic images. The Archive also includes many images from Europe and elsewhere.

It was founded in 1936 by Otto Bettmann (1903–1998), a German curator who immigrated to the United States in 1935. He actively expanded his collection by advertising in magazines, e.g. in the Winter 1959 issue of Film Quarterly "Wanting to buy: Old movie stills - ca. 1915 to 1935; early comedies -- well-known stars and productions."

In 1960, Bettmann moved it from his apartment at 215 East 57th Street, in New York City to the Tishman Building. In 1981, Bettmann sold the archive to the Kraus Thomson Organization.

In 1995, the archive was sold to Corbis, a digital stock photography company founded by Bill Gates. Restrictions of access to the collection arising from this sale were described in the editorial "Goodbye to All That" in the May 2001 issue of American Heritage magazine.

Between late 2001 and March 2002, to preserve the photos and negatives, Corbis moved the archive from Manhattan to the Iron Mountain National Underground Storage Facility, a former limestone quarry located 220 feet (67 m) below ground in western Pennsylvania. The temperature of the storage room is gradually being lowered to −4 °F (−20 °C), which was determined by film preservationist Henry Wilhelm to be the optimal temperature for the long-term storage of the archive. At this temperature, the collection will degrade 500 times more slowly than it did in Manhattan. Meanwhile, Corbis has been scanning the negatives into digital form as they are ordered by clients.

The archive began with Otto Bettmann's personal collection of 15,000 images which he brought with him in suitcases when he escaped from Nazi Germany. Over the years, it acquired other collections, including the Gendreau Collection of Americana in 1967, the Underwood & Underwood Collection of material from late 19th century to World War I in 1971, and the United Press International collection in 1984. Louis Stern Fine Arts exhibited a selection of works from the Bettman Archive in 1999.

Getty Images had taken over the Bettmann Archive before Visual China Group acquired Corbis in 2016.
