= Promo =

Promo or promos may refer to:

== Promotions and advertising ==
- Promo (media), a form of commercial advertising used to promote television or radio programs
- Promo (professional wrestling), a televised interview in which a wrestler's on-screen personality is promoted to the fans
- Promotion (marketing), one of the four aspects of marketing
- Promotional music videos, such as those played on MTV
- Promotional recording, a recording distributed free in order to promote a commercial recording

== Other uses ==
- Promo.com, a video maker and a cloud-based video creation service
- "Promos" (The Office)
- PROMO, an American advocacy group
