= Ryo Utsunomiya =

Japanese photographer

- Born: 1988 (age 37–38); Hyōgo Prefecture, Japan
- Occupations: Photographer, Installation artist
- Website: Official website

Ryo Utsunomiya (born 1988) is a Japanese photographer known for his work focusing on wildlife.

== Biography ==
Utsunomiya was born in Hyōgo Prefecture, Japan.

In 2024, he won the "Photographer of the Year" award at the MUSE Photography Awards.

He has since served as a judge for several international photography competitions.

He is also an ambassador for the global online photo sharing platform 500px

Beyond photography, Utsunomiya creates installation and spatial art in collaboration with cultural and educational institutions.

== Activities ==
- 2025 - Utsunomiya held the exhibition Reverb – Ryo Utsunomiya Exhibition in Gallery Shikisai, located within the Asago Art Village in Japan. Guest photographer Lídia Vives was featured.
- 2024 – Lecturer at the “Outdoor Photo Workshop” sponsored by Arc'teryx in Kobe, Japan.
- 2024 – Teaching the "Liberal Arts Museum Seminar" at Himeji international School.
