= Giphy =

American online database

Giphy, Inc.
- Website type: Subsidiary
- Available in: 32 (Note: English (primary), Arabic, Bengali, Chinese (simplified and traditional), Czech, Danish, Dutch, Finnish, French, German, Hebrew, Hindi, Hungarian, Indonesian, Italian, Japanese, Korean, Malay, Norwegian, Persian, Polish, Portuguese, Romanian, Russian, Spanish, Swedish, Tagalog, Thai, Turkish, Ukrainian and Vietnamese) languages
- Headquarters: New York, New York, U.S.
- Founders: Jace Cooke; Alex Chung
- Products: GIF Platform
- Services: Searching, sharing, and browsing animated GIFs
- Parent: Shutterstock
- Website: giphy.com
- Registration: Optional
- Users: 1.7 billion daily users (2023)
- Launched: February 2013; 13 years ago
- Current status: Active
- Native clients on: Android, iOS, Web browser

Giphy (/ˈɡɪfi/, GHIF-ee), styled as GIPHY, is an American online database and search engine that allows users to search for and share animated GIF files.

== History ==
=== Beginnings and early history ===
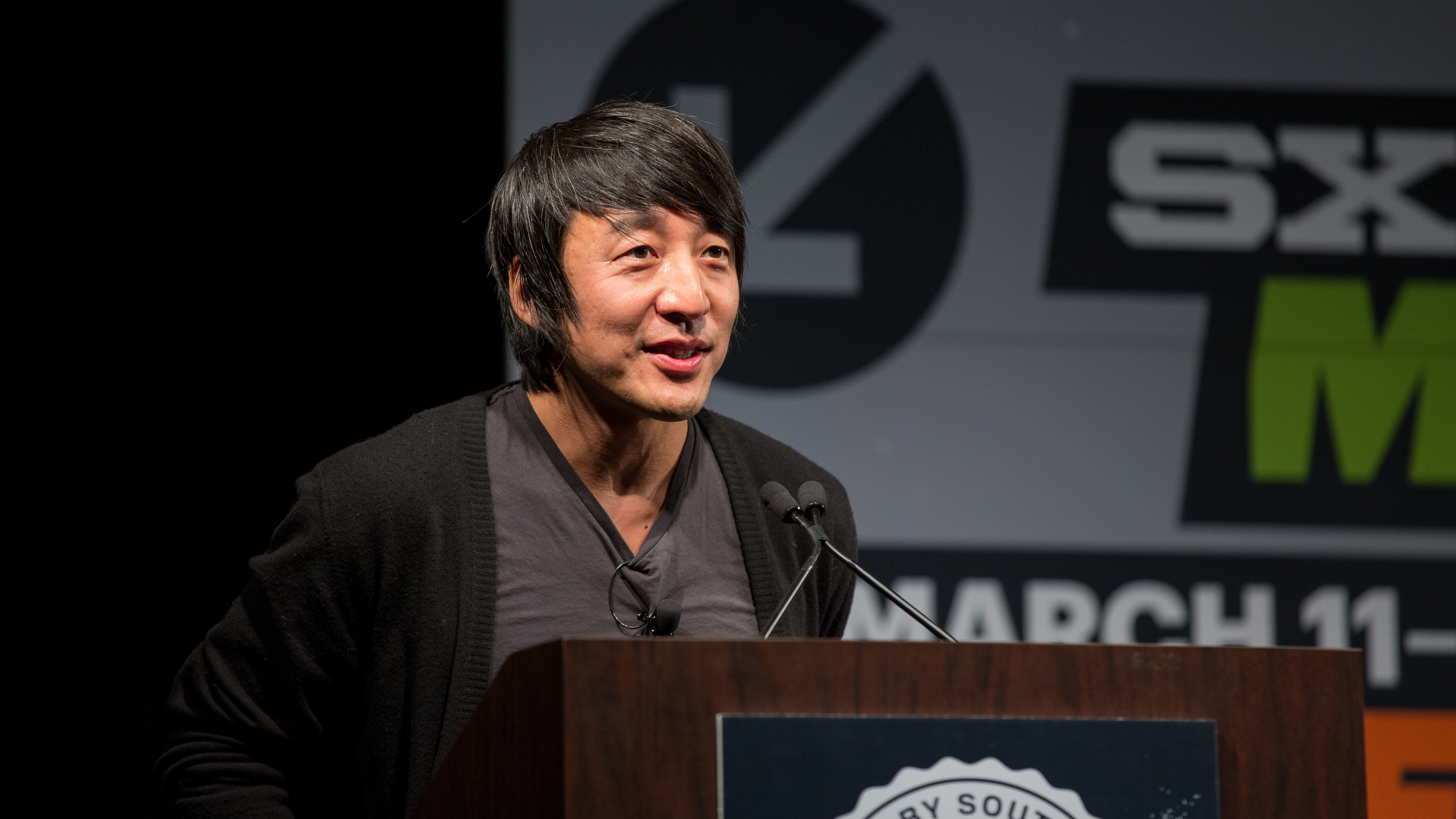
Co-founder Alex Chung at South by Southwest 2016

Giphy was founded by Alex Chung and Jace Cooke in February 2013. The idea for the business came when the pair was having breakfast, musing on the rising trend of purely visual communication.

When Chung and Cooke first launched Giphy, the website functioned solely as a search engine for GIFs. According to Chung, Giphy attracted around a million users during its first week and the figure leveled out to 300,000.

Giphy features what its founders called "conversational search" wherein contents are brought to users' conversations through a search box found in their messaging applications.

=== Growth ===
In August 2013, Giphy expanded beyond a search engine to allow users to post, embed and share GIFs on Facebook. Giphy was then recognized as a Top 100 Website of 2013, according to PC Magazine. Three months later, Giphy integrated with Twitter to enable users to share GIFs by simply sharing a GIF's URL.

In May 2014, Giphy raised $2.4 million in a Series A funding round from investors, including Quire, CAA Ventures, RRE Ventures, Lerer Hippeau Ventures, and Betaworks.

In March 2015, Giphy acquired Nutmeg, a GIF messaging service, as one of the company's first major steps towards the mobile industry. This coincided with the launch of Facebook Messenger's own development platform, in which Giphy joined a few exclusive apps in its debut.

In August 2015, Giphy launched its second mobile app, GIPHY Cam, which allows users to create and share GIFs on a social network.

In February 2016, Giphy raised $55 million in funding at a $300 million valuation.

In October 2016, Giphy announced several statistics, including the statement that it had 100 million daily active users, that it served over 1 billion GIFs per day, and that visitors watched more than 2 million hours of GIF content every day.

In July 2017, Giphy announced that it had 200 million daily active users between both the API and website, with around 250 million monthly active users on the website.

Chung announced in a February 2019 New York event that Giphy was exploring an advertising scheme that is distinguished from the Google model, which shows ads according to users' search histories. The idea is to embed advertising in private messages. Giphy is seeking to take advantage of this landscape since the GIG database has been integrated into most messaging services.

=== Attempted acquisition by Meta Platforms ===
In May 2020, it was announced that Giphy had agreed to be acquired by Facebook Inc. (now Meta Platforms), with a reported purchase price of $400 million. Facebook services had accounted for roughly half of Giphy's overall traffic. Giphy was to be integrated with the staff of Facebook subsidiary Instagram, although Facebook stated that there would be no immediate changes to the service. Facebook discontinued Giphy's display advertising program upon the purchase.

The acquisition faced scrutiny due to recent privacy scandals surrounding Facebook. The United Kingdom's Competition and Markets Authority (CMA) argued that the deal was potentially anti-competitive and began a probe. In June 2020, the CMA issued an enforcement order prohibiting Giphy from being fully integrated into Facebook, pending a future ruling.

In August 2021, the CMA issued preliminary findings, arguing that there was the risk that Facebook could pull Giphy's services from competitors, or require them to provide more user data as a condition of service. It also showed concerns over the market share of Facebook's advertising services. On November 30, 2021, the CMA ruled that Meta would be required to divest Giphy. On July 18, 2022, the Competition Appeal Tribunal ordered the CMA to re-evaluate its decision on procedural grounds, as it "failed to properly consult" and "wrongly excised portions" of its decision. It otherwise upheld most of the CMA's original decision.

On October 18, 2022, the CMA ruled for a second time that Meta be required to divest Giphy, stating that Meta already controls half of the advertising in the UK. Meta agreed to the sale, though it stated that it disagrees with the decision itself.

In May 2023, Shutterstock announced it would buy Giphy from Meta Platforms Inc for $53 million in cash. The acquisition was completed on June 23, 2023.

== Partnerships ==
Giphy partners with brands to host GIFs that can be shared as marketing promotions via social media channels. The company also created artist profiles on the website, which allow GIFs to be attributed to the artist(s) who created them.

In September 2014, Giphy partnered with Line to host the inaugural sticker design competition. LINE and GIPHY enlisted a team of digital partners, including Tumblr, Fox ADHD, Frederator, Cut & Paste, New Museum, Eyebeam, Rhizome, The Webby Awards, Pratt, The Huffington Post and Dribbble to support the event.

In August 2015, Universal Studios partnered with Giphy to release six GIFs promoting the new N.W.A-based movie, Straight Outta Compton.

Giphy has partnered with over 200 companies and brands to host all their existing content on their own branded channel. Giphy's partners include Disney, Calvin Klein, GE, and Pepsi.
