= Roger Ressmeyer =

American photographer

- Born: 11 February 1954; Malverne, New York, US
- Died: 23 August 2018 (aged 64)
- Education: Yale University
- Occupation: Photographer

Roger Ressmeyer (February 11, 1954 – August 23, 2018) was an American photographer. He specialized in a number of fields in photography, including photojournalism, celebrity portraits, musicians, nature and the environment, space and space exploration, and science and technology. He was also an entrepreneur, starting his own photography agency that was ultimately purchased by Bill Gates and merged into the photography agency Corbis, an author, a futurist, a stock photography industry executive, and an advocate for photographers.

== Early life ==
Ressmeyer was raised in Malverne, New York. He was the son, grandson, and great-grandson of Lutheran ministers. He developed a fascination with the Solar System, the universe, and space exploration at an early age, which led him to build model rockets. He also developed an interest in photography at a young age. He merged the two interests at the age of 13, building a telescope with an attached camera. Also at 13 he visited the Grumman Aerospace Corporation factory in Long Island and saw the Lunar Landing Module that was used in the Apollo program in 1969. His early experiences led him to dream of becoming an astronaut.

== Career ==
Ressmeyer tried to pursue his aspiration of becoming an astronaut, but he was unable to do so due to having diabetes. His photography career began with his photographs of Jefferson Airplane. He had moved to San Francisco after graduating from Yale University with a degree in psychology in 1975 and had met band members Grace Slick and Paul Kantner. He photographed the band and they helped him begin the business of licensing his work. He would go on to photograph a number of well-known figures, including Tom Wolfe, Robert Ludlum, Ansel Adams, and Rupert Murdoch, among many others along with shooting album covers for Huey Lewis and the News.

Ressmeyer then expanded his career by photographically exploring what had most inspired him as a youth, the universe beyond Earth. He became a trusted professional in the field of space photography, so much so that NASA brought him on as a photography advisor and instructor for astronauts bound for space in 1991. He served as the editor for the book Orbit: NASA Astronauts Photograph the Earth by Jay Apt, Michael Helfert, and Justin Wilkinson; the book sold over 600,000 copies in 11 languages. He further expanded into science and technology. He founded the agency Star Light Photo Agency in 1992, and then sold it to Bill Gates, who incorporated it into the Corbis agency. He became a senior photo editor at Corbis and then became an executive at Getty Images. In 2005 he was elected president of PACA, the Picture Archive Council of America, a stock photography trade organization.

His work has appeared in publications including National Geographic (where he took the cover photo for the December 1992 issue), Stern, Geo, The New York Times, and many others. He is the author of a number of books, including Space Places, which has a foreword by Colonel Edwin E. (Buzz) Aldrin Jr., the second person to walk on the Moon and Astronaut to Zodiac: A Young Stargazers Alphabet. In 2006, he founded the photography agency Science Faction Images, a rights-managed agency focused on science, technology, and natural history images. Ressmeyer sold Science Faction to Superstock, a leading global photography agency, in 2012.

== Personal life ==
Ressmeyer taught a class in rocketry at the Bush School, Seattle, Washington. He died of a stroke in August, of 2018, after surviving cancer.
