= Janis and Saint Christopher =

Novel by James McKenzie

- Author: James McKenzie
- Cover artist: Yuri Arcurs
- Genre: Urban Fantasy
- Publisher: BookBaby
- Publication place: Australia
- Media type: e-book
- Pages: 239
- ISBN: 9781483503639

Janis and Saint Christopher (2013) is an urban fantasy e-novel by Australian radio presenter James McKenzie.

== Plot summary ==
The e-novel is set in Saint Christopher, an Australian city colonised by the French. Rebel journalist Scott Parker gets into a fight at a media conference and the Christian Lobby stages a protest about the morality of homosexuality when they learn about his husband's outdoor sex park. Aging flower power queen Janis Joplin gets sucked into the drama after she performs a concert at the sex park.

Queerd Magazine said it was "a dark comedy that explores confronting issues. Same-sex divorce, infidelity, barebacking, media manipulation and corruption, political scandals, even Botox addiction gets a guernsey."

== Janis Joplin ==
"I originally intended that Janis would play a cameo in the novel but she wouldn't go away," author James McKenzie told Q News (Australian magazine). "Bringing her to life and exploring what her life would have been like if she hadn't died young was wondrous. She's the book's rock, guiding much younger characters as their lives spin publicly out of control."

== Characters ==
Scott Parker; Janis Joplin; Mick Sarkozy (gay footballer); Ryan Morris (sex park owner); Susie Toasta (manipulative television reporter); Brian Steally (camera man and Susie's husband); Michael Slider (conservative politician); Veronica Slider; Chez Devers (radio station manager and Janis's love interest); Peter Rattle (gay cop); Jane Ernst (Susie's TV rival); Janette Howard.

== Distribution ==
Melbourne's Moreland Leader newspaper said leading online book retailers have distributed Janis and Saint Christopher internationally, including Angus and Robertson and Amazon.
