= Oringer =

Oringer is a surname. Notable people with the surname include:

- Jon Oringer (born 1974), American programmer, photographer, and businessman
- Ken Oringer (born 1965), American chef
- Verveine Oringer (born 2009), American author
