= Oleg Gutsol =

Ukrainian-Canadian Internet entrepreneur

- Born: February 3, 1982 (age 44); Kyiv, Ukraine
- Education: Ryerson University (Applied Computer Science, 2005)
- Occupation: Internet entrepreneur
- Known for: Co-founder of 500px
- Website: oleggutsol.com

Oleg Gutsol (born February 3, 1982) is a Ukrainian-Canadian Internet entrepreneur, co-founder and former CEO of the photography social network and photo distribution platform 500px.

== Education ==
Gutsol was born in Kyiv, Ukraine and moved to Canada as a teenager. He studied Applied Computer Science at Ryerson University in Toronto, Ontario, Canada from 2002 to 2005, and dropped out from his senior year to run the company he started, GSM Toronto, full-time.

== Career ==
Gutsol started learning to write software at the age of 9, after receiving a ZX Spectrum computer as a birthday gift. In 2000, he became interested in website design and development. In 2003 he launched GSM Toronto, a company specializing in distributing, modifying and unlocking GSM phones and development of mobile games for Nokia Series 40, Series 60 and Symbian platforms.

In late 2007 he joined Evgeny Tchebotarev to create 500px out of a LiveJournal community that Evgeny was curating at that time. While working on 500px, Gutsol also took a software development contract with Filemobile, SaaS video platform.

500px went live on Halloween 2009, launched from Gutsol's apartment in downtown Toronto. The company saw exponential growth for the inception and raised a seed round from ffVC and other early stage NYC venture funds in May 2011. The company raised additional $8.8M in August 2013 in Series A funding, led by Andreessen Horowitz, and $13M Series B in July 2015, led by Visual China Group. Beta Kit reported that currently, 500px is used by over 4 million photographers and has over 50 million images on its site.

In September 2014 Gutsol was ousted from 500px, following a disagreement within the leadership team about the direction 500px should take.

In May 2015, together with his wife, he launched Pickapaw, a global community for responsible animal breeders.

In addition to building software companies, Gutsol works with early stage companies through their partnership, O2 Ventures.

In December 2016, following his passion for machine learning and artificial intelligence, Gutsol started working on the collective governance algorithm company, Consensus. In 2019, Consensus launched a blockchain-based feedback tool for the government of South Burlington, Vermont.

== Awards ==
Under Gutsol's leadership, 500px won a PwC Up-and-Coming Technology Company award in November 2012.

== Personal life ==
Gutsol is an amateur Ironman triathlete, having competed in 2014 Ironman North American Championship, 2015 Ironman Muskoka and a number of other races. Additionally, his personal interest is in yoga and meditation.

== Appearances ==
- Gutsol was a guest speaker at the EBE conference in Seville, Spain, 2012
- Grow Conference in Vancouver in 2013
- The Next Web conference in Amsterdam, 2015
- iForum Conference in Kyiv, 2015
- Gutsol also appeared on the episode of the Chase Jarvis LIVE in 2012 with Lawrence Lessig and Richard Kelly, discussing the future of photo sharing.
