= Yuri Arcurs =

Danish photographer

- Born: Jacob Yuri Wackerhausen; 27 July 1979 (age 46); Aarhus, Denmark
- Education: Aarhus Cathedral School, Gardehusarregimentet, Royal Danish Army, First Class Sergeant - Special Support and Reconnaissance Company; Aarhus Universitet Philosophy, Aarhus Universitet Psychology
- Occupations: Photographer, Psychologist - Interaction Design, Speaker, Entrepreneur IT, Investor
- Known for: World’s top selling stock photographer since 2009 and proposed as one of the highest earning photographers in the world
- Spouse: Cecilie Skjold Johansen
- Website: Official Website

Yuri Arcurs, born Jacob Yuri Wackerhausen on July 27, 1979 is a Danish stock photographer and owner of PeopleImages.com. In 2007 he was the top ranked selling contributor at Shutterstock, Fotolia, Crestock and BigStockPhoto In 2008 Arcurs sold 650,000 images per year through 16 different microstock agencies

A 2010 vote by readers of PDN Magazine ranked Arcurs among the "30 Most Influential Photographers" of the decade. In 2011, he was considered to be the best selling microstock photographer in the world, selling more than 2 million images in a year and in 2012, it was reported that he sold 450 images per hour.

== Career ==
Arcurs is the owner of peopleimages.com. He is working mostly in the realm of online industry of stock imagery.

Arcurs started selling his images online as a hobby in 2005 whilst studying Psychology at Aarhus University. His images were sold through online agencies like Shutterstock. Arcurs is most well known for selling microstock images. Arcurs has completed minor formal education in photography but is well regarded for his highly technical approach. He has an agreement with both Hasselblad and Profoto. Arcurs has his own product line of photography equipment of which the Yuri Arcurs SteadyPod is the most popular item and is currently still for sale.

Arcurs attends larger microstock and microstock related events and has, among other activities, given the opening lecture at Cepic in 2010 and taken part in a panel discussion hosted by B&H Photo.

== Personal life ==
Arcurs attended Aarhus Katedralskole and matriculated as a mathematical major. In 2002 he served for 6 months in Kosovo. He used to be a freelance student journalist after which he started a graphic design firm. He also obtained a bachelor of psychology, a bachelor of philosophy and graduated from the Danish School of Photography. As of 2015, Arcurs is living in Cape Town, South Africa with his Norwegian fiancée Cecilie Skjold Johansen who maintains a job as a corporate psychologist. His father, Steen Wackerhausen, is a professor of philosophy at Aarhus University and holds a dual doctoral degree in both psychology and philosophy. Yuri's mother, Birgitte Krogh Wackerhausen, is a teacher with several courses completed in the field of Psychology.

== Business structure ==
Yuri Arcurs Photography supplies images to the stock industry and allows licensing to buyers. The resulting royalties make up a bulk of earnings. As of 2012 the company employed more than 100 people; around 15 of whom are in-house photographers. The majority of staff are engaged in post-production such as retouching and keywording.

Arcurs has also been involved with an outsourcing company in India there has however been no recent mention of ongoing involvement. A newly formed subsidiary in Cape Town, South Africa Yuri Arcurs Productions manage these aspects of the post-production. In 2009 and the company had a royalty income of about 3 million USD per year and in 2012 it was said to be way higher with a goal of 8 figures in sight.

On May 3, 2012, Yuri launched PeopleImages to serve as a direct sales platform for his image collection.

The launch was covered by Danish television with Yuri’s top selling model Emma W. H. as a featured guest due to her status as the world’s best selling female model.

Yuri Arcurs Productions has a charity program to recruit and train new retouchers who come from poor circumstances and are unable to afford computers and software. This program, called "the ambition program", received a grant of R600 000 from the Cape Town film commission.
