= BENlabs =

American licensing company

Coordinates: 47.603365°N 122.333354°W

BEN Group, Inc.
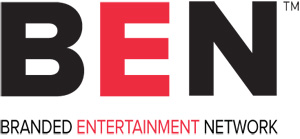
- Formerly: BEN Group
- Type: Private
- Industry: Advertising; Rights clearance
- Founded: 1989; 37 years ago (as Interactive Home Systems)
- Headquarters: Los Angeles, California, U.S.
- Key people: Theodore Sheffield (CEO)
- Owner: Bill Gates
- Website: www.benlabs.com

BENlabs, formerly BEN Group Inc., is a Los Angeles–based product placement, influencer marketing and licensing company. The company offers AI-driven product placement, influencer marketing services, music partnerships, rights clearance, and personality rights management services for the entertainment industry.

The company was founded in Seattle by Bill Gates in 1989 as Interactive Home Systems, and later renamed Corbis. The company's original goal was to license and digitize artwork and other historic images for the prospective concept of digital frames. In 1997, Corbis changed its business model to focus on licensing the imagery and footage in its collection.

The Corbis collection included contemporary creative, editorial, entertainment, and historical photography as well as art and illustrations. Among its acquisitions were the 11 million piece Bettmann Archive, acquired in 1995; the Sygma collection in France (1999); and the German stock image company ZEFA (2005). Corbis also had the rights to digital reproduction for art from the Hermitage Museum in St. Petersburg, Russia, the Philadelphia Museum of Art and the National Gallery in London.

Corbis later expanded into providing services for the entertainment industry, including brand integration and rights clearance services. In January 2016, Corbis announced that it had sold its image licensing businesses to Unity Glory International, an affiliate of Visual China Group. VCG licensed the images to Corbis's historic rival, Getty Images, outside China. Corbis retained its entertainment businesses under the name Branded Entertainment Network, which has since evolved to BENlabs.

== Lines of business ==
BEN Group's Inc's businesses include product placement services, the celebrity photo agency Splash News, as well as Greenlight, a business that provides clearances for images, music, video, and licenses personality rights for commercial use. BEN directly represents the personality rights of various figures, including Albert Einstein, Buzz Aldrin, Sophia Loren, Charlie Chaplin, Maria Callas, Andy Warhol, Martin Luther King Jr., Marvin Gaye, Muhammad Ali, Steve McQueen, and Thomas Edison among others. In 2015, BEN Group Inc acquired Plaid Social Labs, a leader in digital influencer marketing and integrations. In 2016, BEN Group Inc sold Splash.

== History ==
=== Founding ===
Bill Gates founded the company in 1989 under the name Interactive Home Systems; he envisioned a system for allowing customers to decorate their homes with revolving displays of artwork, including works by notable painters, using digital frames and technology that had yet to have been developed. The company's name was changed to Continuum Productions in 1992 and later, to Corbis Corporation. Interactive television was suggested as a way to deliver the content, but as the development of the planned product was under way, Corbis focused on digitizing content and acquiring rights to images. Corbis signed agreements with the National Gallery of London, the Library of Congress, the Sakamoto Archive, the Philadelphia Museum of Art, and the State Hermitage Museum in St. Petersburg, Russia.

In October 1995, the company purchased the Bettmann Archive collection, which included the pre-1983 photo library of United Press International and its predecessor photo agencies, Acme and INP, the photo arm of the International News Service. Prior to acquiring the Bettmann Archive, Corbis represented roughly 500,000 images, a total that increased substantially when the Bettmann drawings, artworks, news photographs, and other illustrations were added to the company's portfolio. In all the Bettmann Archive contained 19 million images. The archive was stored 220 feet underground in a refrigerated cave in the Iron Mountain storage facility,

In 1995, the company won a contract with its first major photographer, Roger Ressmeyer, followed by several more, including Galen Rowell; this signalled growing interest in the world of professional photography, which up to that point had not taken the company seriously. In 1996 the company acquired the exclusive rights to approximately 40,000 images photographed by wilderness photographer Ansel Adams.

In 1997, Corbis named company veterans, Steve Davis and Tony Rojas, co-CEOs. Corbis also hired David Rheins to run Corbis' Productions, and Leslie Hughes to lead the company's B2B image licensing division, Corbis Images. These hires marked the company's shift to a more market focused entity. Corbis Productions published several award-winning CD-ROM titles such as A Passion for Art: Renoir, Cézanne, Matisse, and Dr. Barnes, compiled from the Barnes Foundation collection, and Leonardo da Vinci, which showcased the Codex Leicester.

In 1998, Leslie Hughes was named President of Corbis Images. The company expanded internationally and through product development and further acquisitions. The company acquired Digital Stock Corp., a supplier of royalty-free images to further expand its offering. In 1998, another division was added to Corbis Images when the company acquired Outline Press Syndicate, Inc., a supplier of celebrity portrait photography. Renamed Corbis Outline, the company syndicated studio portraits and candid photographs of actors, musicians, athletes, politicians, business leaders, scientists, and other celebrities and provided the images for sale to a broad range of national magazines. The same year, Corbis also acquired Westlight, adding over 3 million images to their archives while scanning best selling images.

In June 1999, the company acquired the French news photo agency Sygma, adding 40 million additional images to the company's collection, and expanding Corbis's portfolio beyond 65 million images. The archive is today stored in a preservation and access facility outside Paris.

In 2000, Microsoft (a fellow venture of Gates) purchased the rights through Corbis to the image Bucolic Green Hills, which it renamed to Bliss for the default wallpaper of Windows XP. The image was taken in the Los Carneros American Viticultural Area of Sonoma County, California, United States by photographer Charles O'Rear in 1996, who previously sent it to Westlight which Corbis had acquired in 1998.

=== 2000–2010 ===
Corbis's business-to-business image licensing business expanded with the growth of the internet in the early part of the decade. The company also expanded geographically, making multiple acquisitions such as the Stock Market and expanding into the footage licensing market with the acquisition of Sekani.

- In 2000, after the company's dramatic growth in the professional licensing business, Corbis named Leslie Hughes President of the newly consolidated Markets and Products Group (CMPG). The new group represented the consolidation of formerly separate business units, professional licensing and business communicator (small office).
- In 2001 Corbis built a state-of-the-art preservation facility in western Pennsylvania to house the Bettmann Archive. Corbis committed to preserving the collection for generations to come, and to allow continued access to this extraordinary collection.
- In late 2002, Leslie Hughes stepped down as President of Corbis' Markets and Products Group. Steve Davis was named as sole CEO, and Tony Rojas was appointed the company's president.
- In 2005, the company expanded further into Europe with the acquisition of zefa, and into Australia in 2006, with the acquisition of Australian Picture Library.
- In April 2007, the company announced it was naming new leadership. Steve Davis stepped down as CEO, and Gary Shenk was named as the new CEO as of July 1. Shenk oversaw aggressive cost-cutting efforts to improve the company's financial performance and address the rise of low-cost competitors. The company experienced several waves of layoffs for the next several years, shed non-profitable lines of business and reduced its number of offices globally.
- In November 2007, Corbis announced that it would be purchasing Veer and would continue to operate it as a separate brand.
- In early June 2007, Corbis announced that it was creating a microstock website, SnapVillage. The company said it intended to use its microstock site as a farm club to find photographers who could also sell their photographs on the main Corbis Web site. In late June, the company launched SnapVillage, with about 10,000 images initially viewable. SnapVillage was closed due to low sales in early 2009 and rolled into Veer.
- Corbis rebranded its Rights Services Division, previously a Division of Corbis Images, as "GreenLight" in 2008.
- In July 2008 Corbis sold eMotion LLC, its media management division, to Open Text Corporation.
- In May 2009, Corbis opened the Sygma Preservation and Access Facility outside Paris, France, housing tens of millions of photographic elements from the past half century in Europe. The company in 2009 also re-launched its Corbis Motion website with hundreds of thousands of new video clips, after signing a new partnership with Thought Equity Motion.
- In 2010, Corbis increased its focus on serving web and mobile customers, with the introduction of low-resolution file sizes images that were more affordable for Web and Mobile use. Corbis also relaunched its Veer.com website with a greater focus on affordable images and fonts to compete more effectively against low cost competitors.
- In 2010, Corbis was found to have committed fraud against Infoflows Corporation.
- In this decade, Corbis has discussed its financial direction in moving towards profitability multiple times without success.

=== 2011–2013 ===
- In January 2011, Shirley Jones sued Corbis alleging the company violated her publicity rights, and seeking class-action status for other celebrities. The case was thrown out in June 2011, with the court forcing Jones to pay Corbis's legal fees and other costs.
- July 2011 – Five Photographers take Corbis to court for misuse of corporate assets in closing Corbis Sygma.
- July 2011 – Corbis acquires Splash News, a Los Angeles–based firm that deals in celebrity photography.
- August 2011 – Corbis and the Associated Press announce a distribution deal to try to reach each other's customers for current and archival photographs. Corbis' collection includes the library of onetime AP-rival UPI, acquired in the purchase of Bettmann.
- January 2012 – Corbis acquires the product placement agency Norm Marshall Group.
- May 2012 – Washington State Appellate Court upholds jury verdict that Corbis committed fraud.
- Nov 2012 – Corbis expands global media footprint and acquires breaking news photojournalism newswire, Demotix, following successful investment and global distribution partnership.

=== Since 2016: Sale of image licensing business ===
On January 22, 2016, Corbis announced that it had sold its general image licensing business, including the Corbis Images, Corbis Motion and Veer libraries and their associated assets, to Unity Glory, an affiliate of Visual China Group. The sale did not include the Corbis Entertainment business, which would remain owned by the company under a new name. Concurrently, it was announced that VCG would exclusively license distribution of the Corbis images library outside China to its rival, Getty Images. VCG has historically served as the exclusive distributor of Getty content in China. Distribution of Corbis content was transitioned to Getty's outlets, and the company manages Corbis's physical archives on behalf of VCG. Of the deal, Getty CEO Jonathan Klein remarked that after 21 years in business, it was "lovely to get the milk, the cream, cheese, yogurt and the meat without buying the cow."

In May 2016, following the handover of the Corbis images business to Unity Glory and Getty, Corbis Entertainment was renamed Branded Entertainment Network, and re-located its operations to Los Angeles. CEO Gary Shenk stated that the company had organized over 5,000 brand placements in 2015, with clients including Cadillac, Jose Cuervo, Microsoft, and others. In 2018, Ricky Ray Butler, was named CEO. In 2020 BEN won the Agency of the Year award at the 10th Streamy Awards.

In February 2023, BEN Group was rebranded as BENlabs.

== See also ==
- Image hosting service
- List of online image archives
- List of photo sharing websites
- Social media influencer
