= Promo.com =

Video maker and a cloud-based video creation service

- Type: Private
- Industry: Video creation service Video slideshows
- Founded: Tel Aviv, Israel 2012
- Founder: Tom More
- Headquarters: Tel Aviv, Israel
- Area served: Worldwide
- Key people: Tom More (Founder)
- Number of employees: 78
- Parent: EasyHi Ltd
- Website: promo.com

Promo.com is a cloud-based video creation service. It allows the creation of videos from stock videos, photos, video clips, and music. The company has offices in Warsaw, New York City, and Tel Aviv.

== History ==
Promo was launched in 2016 by founder Tom More.

In October 2017, the company announced that it had acquired Unstock, a mobile-first marketplace for authentic footage, based in Poland.

In January 2018, the company was awarded Best B2B Product of the Year at Product Hunt's 2017 Golden Kitty Awards.

In January 2019, the company announced that it was changing its name to Promo.com and moving to a new domain.

In December 2023, Promo.com announced the launch of PromoAI, its automatic video generator powered by Getty Images and ChatGPT.

== Business ==
Promo.com employs around 50 people as of 2018. In its first year, the company raised $1.5 million in Series A funding.

In 2021 the company announced an additional capital and debt raise, with participation from Getty Images.

== See also ==
- List of social networking websites
