= Crew (company) =

Defunct company of Canada

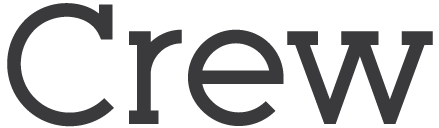
- Headquarters: Montreal, Quebec
- Founders: Mikael Cho; Angus Woodman; Stephanie Liverani; Luke Chesser
- Website: crew.co

Crew was a technology company from Montreal, Quebec. The company develops, markets, and operates the Crew app, which lets individuals find freelance graphic designers, illustrators and software developers. Crew's freelancers have completed projects for companies such as Dropbox, Medium, Tinder, Eventbrite and IDEO.

In addition to its freelancer marketplace, Crew operated Unsplash, a photography website where users can submit copyright-free photography. As of 2016, over 40,000 photographers have submitted original photos to Unsplash.

In April 2017, Crew was sold to Dribbble to focus on Unsplash.
