= Lovesick (1983 film) =

Film by Marshall Brickman

- Theatrical release poster
- Directed by: Marshall Brickman
- Written by: Marshall Brickman
- Produced by: Charles Okun
- Starring: Dudley Moore; Elizabeth McGovern; John Huston; Alec Guinness
- Cinematography: Gerry Fisher
- Edited by: Nina Feinberg
- Music by: Philippe Sarde
- Production company: The Ladd Company
- Distributed by: Warner Bros.
- Release date: February 18, 1983
- Running time: 96 minutes
- Country: United States
- Language: English
- Budget: $10.1 million
- Box office: $10 million

Lovesick is a 1983 American romantic comedy film written and directed by Marshall Brickman. It stars Dudley Moore and Elizabeth McGovern and features Alec Guinness as the ghost of Sigmund Freud.

== Plot ==
Psychoanalyst Saul Benjamin takes on a patient temporarily as a favor to a colleague friend, Otto Jaffe, who is infatuated with her. After Dr. Jaffe dies, Chloe Allen comes to see Dr. Benjamin and he is smitten with her immediately.

The doctor-patient relationship is violated by Dr. Benjamin's romantic impulses toward Chloe and by his intense jealousy of anyone who comes near her, including Ted Caruso, an arrogant Broadway actor with whom she has become involved. Dr. Benjamin's wife Katie is also carrying on an affair with Jac Applezweig, an artist.

The ghost of Dr. Sigmund Freud, the father of modern psychology, visits Dr. Benjamin from time to time to dispense warnings and wisdom. Dr. Benjamin's work begins to suffer as he abandons patients like Mrs. Mondragon, finding her tedious, and treats the paranoia of another, Marvin Zuckerman, by giving him a tin foil hat for him to wear.

A board of inquiry calls in Dr. Benjamin to consider revoking his license. In the end, he admits his feelings to Chloe and concludes that he prefers true love to treating the sick.

== Cast ==
- Dudley Moore as Saul Benjamin
- Elizabeth McGovern as Chloe Allen
- John Huston as Dr. Larry Geller
- Alan King as Dr. Lionel Gross
- Gene Saks as Mr. Hausman
- Wallace Shawn as Otto Jaffe
- Ron Silver as Ted Caruso
- Renée Taylor as Mrs. Mondragon
- Alec Guinness as Sigmund Freud
- Anne De Salvo as Case Interviewer
- Selma Diamond as Dr. Harriet Singer
- David Strathairn as Marvin Zuckerman
- Christine Baranski as Nymphomaniac
- Kent Broadhurst as Gay Patient
- Lester Rawlins as Silent Patient
- Anne Kerry Ford as Katie Benjamin
- Anna Berger as Analyst
- Wolfgang Zilzer as Analyst
- Fred Melamed as Analyst
- Ann Gillespie as Actress
- John Tillinger as Director
- Larry Rivers as Jac Applezweig
- Richard B. Shull as Dr. Fessner
- Raynor Scheine as Shelter Man
- Mark Blum as Murphy
- Stefan Schnabel as Dr. Gunnar Bergsen
- Otto Bettmann as Dr. Maurice Waxman

== Production ==
Lovesick was one of two early-1980s films originally intended to star Peter Sellers. Production was to have begun in early 1981, once Sellers had finished shooting Romance of the Pink Panther. Sellers's death in July 1980, before Romance of the Pink Panther had even started production, meant that his roles in both Lovesick and 1984's Unfaithfully Yours went to Dudley Moore.

Peter Falk was then announced to replace Sellers. Diane Keaton, Ellen Burstyn and Mary Steenburgen were under consideration for the female lead, before Beverly D'Angelo was then cast. However, when Falk became dissatisfied with the screenplay, he resigned from the project while it was in pre-production. Dudley Moore signed on to replace Falk in the lead. Once Falk dropped out, D'Angelo left the project as well, resulting in Elizabeth McGovern taking over her role.

== Reception ==
=== Release ===
Lovesick was released in theatres on February 18, 1983. The film was released on DVD on October 20, 1998, by Warner Home Video.

=== Critical response ===
Film critic Vincent Canby wrote in his review, "Mr. Moore and Miss McGovern are such appealing lovers that the movie successfully bypasses all questions of ethics." Book editors Laurence Goldstein and Ira Konigsberg wrote in their book, The Movies: Texts, Receptions, Exposures, "One looks back with nostalgia to a time when psychotherapists are not fools like [...] lovesick fools like Dudley Moore [...] Psychotherapists were certainly portrayed as comic and horrific figures in earlier films, but they were a good deal of respect than in recent years."
