= Shutterstock =

American photography, film and music library provider

Shutterstock, Inc.
- Type: Public
- Traded as: NYSE: SSTK
- Industry: Stock photography, stock footage, stock music
- Founded: 2002; 24 years ago
- Founder: Jon Oringer
- Headquarters: Empire State Building, New York City, U.S.
- Area served: Worldwide
- Key people: Jon Oringer (chairman); Paul Hennessy (CEO)
- Products: Shutterstock Editor, Shutterstock Tab, Shutterstock Image Subscription
- Services: Licensing of stock media
- Revenue: ▲US$875 million (2023)
- Operating income: ▲US$68.4 million (2023)
- Net income: ▲US$110 million (2023)
- Total assets: ▲US$1.04 billion (2023)
- Total equity: ▲US$527 million (2023)
- Owner: Jon Oringer (33.3%)
- Number of employees: 1,274 (2023)
- Subsidiaries: Giphy; TurboSquid; Bigstock; Pond5; Splash News; Offset; Rex Features; BEImages; PremiumBeat; Rocketstock
- Website: shutterstock.com

Shutterstock, Inc. is an American provider of stock photography, stock footage, stock music, and editing tools; it is headquartered in New York. Founded in 2002 by programmer and photographer Jon Oringer, Shutterstock maintains a library of around 200 million royalty-free stock photos, vector graphics, and illustrations, with around 10 million video clips and music available for licensing. Originally a subscription site only, Shutterstock expanded beyond subscriptions into à la carte pricing in 2008. It has been publicly traded on the New York Stock Exchange since 2012. In January 2025, it was announced that the company would be merging with Getty Images, and in July 2026 this merger was cancelled following intervention from the Competition and Market Authority in the UK.

== History ==
=== Founding and early years (2003–2011) ===
Shutterstock was founded in 2003 by American entrepreneur and computer programmer Jon Oringer. Creating his own online marketplace, Oringer initially uploaded 30,000 of his own stock photos and made them available via subscription, with unlimited downloads and a monthly starting fee of US$49. When demand exceeded his photo supply, he began hiring additional contributors. In 2006, the firm claimed that it was the "largest subscription-based stock photo agency in the world" with 570,000 images in its collection. The firm branched into film in 2006 with the launch of Shutterstock Footage. By 2007, the company had 1.8 million photos. Insight Venture Partners invested in the company that year. Shutterstock expanded beyond subscriptions into à la carte pricing in August 2008, with its "On Demand" service removing daily download limits.

On September 23, 2009, Shutterstock announced that it had purchased Bigstock, a rival credit-based microstock photography agency. Fast Company argued the deal put "Shutterstock on a competitive playing field with Getty, whose iStock Photo is also credit-based." Shutterstock had 11 million royalty-free stock images by early 2010. In February 2011, it announced a two-year partnership with the American Institute of Graphic Arts (AIGA).

=== Acquisitions and IPO (2012–2013) ===
Shutterstock logo used from 2012 to 2025.

By April 2012 the company had 18 million royalty-free stock images. The firm announced the Shutterstock Instant tool in May 2012, which displayed images in an interlocking mosaic to increase viewing speed. The product was launched by the newly formed Shutterstock Labs, which develops tools and interfaces for Shutterstock, among other projects. In May 2012, Shutterstock filed for an initial public offering on the New York Stock Exchange, which it completed on October 17, 2012, under the ticker SSTK.

Shutterstock, Inc. announced Spectrum, a new "image discovery tool," in March 2013. At the time, the firm had 24 million licensable photos, vectors and illustrations in its portfolio. In August 2013, Shutterstock and Facebook announced a partnership to integrate Shutterstock's library within Facebook's Ad Creator, allowing advertisers to select from Shutterstock's images when creating ads. At the time, Shutterstock was available in 20 languages including Thai, Korean, French, Italian, Portuguese, Spanish, German, Russian, Chinese, and Japanese.

=== Offset and new partnerships (2013–2014) ===
In September 2013, Shutterstock launched Offset, a marketplace prioritizing high end curated photos from established artists. In October 2013, the firm stated it served 750,000 customers, with 30 percent of those customers in Europe. Shutterstock's shares had reached a $2.5 billion market value by the fall of 2013, while revenue for 2013 was US$235 million.

In March 2014, Shutterstock acquired Webdam, a provider of online digital asset management software. In May 2014, the firm partnered with Salesforce to integrate Shutterstock's image library into Salesforce's Social Studio. Shutterstock debuted its Palette tool in July 2014, a "multi-color image discovery tool." The firm announced it had surpassed 2 million video clips on September 2, 2014. Shortly afterwards it revealed a new app meant to help contributors with uploading and categorizing photos. Shutterstock's revenue was $328 million in 2014, an increase of 39 percent from 2013. In 2014, Shutterstock paid "over $83 million to its roughly 80,000 contributors."

=== Recent developments (2015–present) ===
In January 2015, Shutterstock acquired both Rex Features, Europe's largest independent photo press agency for $33 million, and PremiumBeat, a stock music and sound effects service, for $32 million. Penske Media Corporation formed a partnership with Shutterstock in June 2015 to create and license entertainment and fashion images. According to the terms of the deal, by 2016 Shutterstock would have an exclusive right and license to PMC's archive, which included magazines such as Variety, Women's Wear Daily, and Deadline. Crain's wrote that with the partnership, "Shutterstock, a provider of stock imagery and music tracks, is stepping into the world of red carpets and fashion runways—and taking a key provider of fashion and entertainment photos and video away from archrival Getty Images.".

By March 2016, the company had "over 100,000 contributors," with around 70 million images and 4 million video clips available for licensing and sale. That month Shutterstock announced it would be distributing material from the Associated Press in the United States, with the deal to last 3 years and cover 30 million photos and around 2 million videos. The photos were expected to go live in April. According to Entrepreneur, Shutterstock also had an "active customer base of 1.4 million people in 150 countries."

In July 2016, Shutterstock revealed a partnership with Google advertising products including AdSense, AdWords, and AdMob. The integration allows marketers creating Google ads to directly access Shutterstock images and track ad performance via the Shutterstock API. In October 2016, the firm announced a distribution deal with the European Pressphoto Agency.

In February 2018, Shutterstock invested $15 million into China based ZCool, building on the operational relationship the two firms have had since 2014 when ZCool first became the exclusive distributor of Shutterstock creative content in China. Webdam, which Shutterstock itself acquired back in 2014, was sold to Amsterdam-based Bynder for $49.1 million to move Shutterstock's strategy away from digital asset management. Shutterstock later entered into a partnership with Tencent Social Ads, the online advertising subsidiary of Tencent.

In May 2018, IBM's Watson Content Hub, a content management system (CMS) for marketers to create content using the IBM Watson AI search tool, announced its partnership with Shutterstock, beginning July 2018.

In May 2020, the company announced that it updated its contributor earnings structure as of June 1, from a minimum flat-rate to a percentage-based model. Contributor income may be reduced from the previous minimum payment per downloaded image of 25 cents to 10 cents, or 15 percent of sales, at the entry level, with author ratings reset to zero at the beginning of each year. Many photographers voiced their opposition to the new changes.

In June 2021, Shutterstock announced a partnership with the American media conglomerate People, Inc. (then Meredith Corporation) for the exclusive rights to over 800,000 historical photographs from the LIFE Picture Collection, the archival photo collection of Life Magazine. Shutterstock currently sells commercial licenses these images through its Shutterstock Editorial brand, including many which were previously in the public domain.

In May 2022, the company acquired Pond5, an online marketplace for royalty-free and editorial video, consisting of over 30 million video clips, 1.6 million music tracks, and 1.7 million sound effect assets at the time for $210M. Also in May 2022, the company acquired Splash News, an entertainment news network for newsrooms and media companies.

Shutterstock announced it would buy Giphy from Meta Platforms for $53 million in cash in May 2023, after Meta was ordered by UK's Competition and Markets Authority to divest it.

In July 2023, Shutterstock announced a six-year partnership with OpenAI in which it would provide access to its audio, video and image libraries as training data for DALL-E. In turn, OpenAI would provide generative AI capabilities to Shutterstock's mobile users through Giphy database.

Shutterstock announced it entered into a definitive agreement to acquire Envato for $245 million in cash in May 2024, thus adding 650,000 Envato subscribers to its subscriber base and increasing its library of creative assets. The acquisition was formally finalized at the end of July 2024.

In January 2025, it was announced that the company would be merging with Getty Images. The UK's Competition and Markets Authority launched an investigation into the proposed merger in August 2025.

In February 2026, the United States Department of Justice granted unconditional antitrust clearance for the Getty Images merger. Shutterstock reported record full-year 2025 revenue of $989.9 million, up 6% year-over-year, with record adjusted EBITDA of $271.8 million.

== Corporate governance ==
=== Facilities and staff ===
Shutterstock is headquartered in New York. In October 2013 Shutterstock opened its new European headquarters in Berlin, Germany and by March 2014, Shutterstock had additional offices in Amsterdam, Chicago, Denver, London, Montréal, Paris and San Francisco. After maintaining its New York headquarters for years in a Wall Street office, in March 2014 Shutterstock relocated into the Empire State Building. According to Inc., the office was selected with the goal of decreasing commute times for New York employees. The new location was built with no private offices, instead with 23 "pop-in rooms" for private meetings and conferences when needed.

After its founding in 2003 with CEO Jon Oringer as the sole employee, by 2007 Shutterstock had grown to 30 people. In 2010 Oringer hired Thilo Semmelbauer as COO, who had previously worked with TheLadders.com and Weight Watchers. With 295 employees as of October 2013, the firm had grown to 700 employees as of 2016. In 2014, Fast Company published an article featuring Shutterstock as an example of a successful "intrapreneur"-reliant company, touting the company's "hackathons" for fostering staff creativity.

In an attempt to penetrate the Chinese market, Shutterstock implemented compliance with Chinese law by censoring results for Chinese users. Over 180 Shutterstock employees signed a petition against the decision.

=== Business model ===
Shutterstock licenses media for online download on behalf of photographers, designers, illustrators, videographers and musicians, maintaining a library of almost 200 million royalty-free stock photos, vector graphics, and illustrations. Shutterstock also has 10 million video clips and music clips in its portfolio. While Shutterstock currently has several payment models, The Atlantic wrote in 2012 that Shutterstock "pioneered the subscription approach to stock photo sales, allowing customers to download images in bulk rather than à la carte." The Atlantic further wrote that Shutterstock is "a web community in the manner of a Facebook or a Twitter or a Pinterest, with its value relying almost entirely on the enthusiasms of its contributors."

With potential contributors able to apply to the site for free, Shutterstock has a team of reviewers "charged with ensuring editorial consistency and quality." As of 2016, if one of ten of a photographer's pictures are accepted, then they become a Shutterstock contributor. As of 2011, only around 20 percent of applicants were approved, and "less than 60 percent of all the images uploaded by those approved contributors were ultimately put up on the site." Once approved, contributors can begin uploading their work through the website. They supply keywords, categorize the images, and submit them to the "inspection queue", where images are examined for quality, usefulness and copyright and trademark laws. Each time an image is downloaded, the photographer receives a flat rate. Explains Vice, "photographers retain copyright over their images, but Shutterstock is given full permission to market, display, and license the image to the customers on their site without final approval from the photographer." As of March 2015, contributors added around 50,000 new images daily, and Shutterstock had paid around $250 million to contributors since its founding. In 2014, it paid $80 million to contributors.

== Products ==
=== Shutterstock film and music ===
Shutterstock began licensing stock video in February 2006. Shutterstock Footage operates similarly to their image library, offering video clips by subscription or on a per-clip basis. As of 2014, Shutterstock Footage contained around 2 million royalty-free video clips. Shutterstock Music debuted later, with new content submittable by contributors.

=== Shutterstock apps ===
Shutterstock for iPad was launched in November 2011, and in May 2012 the app received a Webby Award for People's Voice in the tablet app category for utilities and services. Shutterstock for iPad was followed in 2012 by a universal iOS app, which by 2013 had been downloaded 650,000 times. The iOS app originally lacked the ability to download images, with that functionality added later. The universal iOS app also included new features for Shutterstock, including the ability to filter image searches by color. Shutterstock debuted an Android App in 2013, and in September 2014, Shutterstock launched an app dedicated to its contributors, both available for iOS and Android. The app allows contributors to upload, keyword and categorize new images.

=== Shutterstock Labs ===
In 2012, Shutterstock launched Shutterstock Labs, a lab for "exploratory tools and products." In May 2012, Shutterstock Images LLC announced the Shutterstock Instant tool, which according to the company was inspired by Shutterstock for iPad. The interface displays images in an interlocking mosaic view, allowing users to view more photos in less time. Shutterstock Instant was made available on the Shutterstock Labs website. The prototype for the search tool Spectrum was launched on March 21, 2013. With development in-house by Shutterstock Labs, the tool "indexes hexagram data to yield search results by color." In July 2014, Shutterstock launched Palette, which allows users to add colors to the terms of the search, in addition to keywords.

=== Computer vision ===
Shutterstock has developed a number of tools utilizing a "convolutional neural network" that it created to help with reverse image search technology. The network is "essentially a computer system that is trained to recognize images—there are millions of specific items such as cats, bicycles, the night sky—and pull up the most relevant photos." It "breaks down the key components of a photo numerically, drawing from its pixel data instead of metadata that is pulled from those tags and keywords."

In March 2016, Shutterstock debuted its Reverse Image Search tool. According to Entrepreneur, with the tool "users can upload an image, either from Shutterstock or another source, and the tool will call up images that look like and have a similar feel to the original photo." The reverse image search allows users to not just search by keywords, but to also find images based on "color schemes, mood, or shapes." Later that month, the firm debuted its Similar Search and Discovery tools, with the "similar search" option provided beneath photos on its website.

=== AI Image Generator ===
Shutterstock also offers an online service for generating images, based on DALL-E 2.

== Criticism ==
=== Censorship of results in China ===
In September 2019, at the request of the Chinese government, engineers at Shutterstock began designing a regional application to comply with government censorship in China, and implemented it in October 2019. The system is designed to return no results to users with IP addresses in China in response to six queries for forbidden keywords or phrases: "Xi Jinping", "Mao Zedong", "Taiwan flag", "dictator", "Chinese flag", "yellow umbrella", or variations.

=== Copyright theft ===
In July 2020, Users at Wikimedia Commons reported widespread copyright theft at Shutterstock. Images from many Wikimedia contributors were hosted on the site. Shutterstock were first made aware of the problem in April 2020, but no action has been taken to remove the images nor any compensation offered. The copyright theft has continued into 2022.

=== Distribution of an AI-generated news image ===
In November 2026, Shutterstock distributed an AI-generated image falsely depicting the destruction of the Crimean Bridge. The image was circulated as a news photograph. Finnish public broadcaster Yle identified the image as AI-generated through visual analysis and Google's SynthID detection technology.

== See also ==
- Companies listed on the New York Stock Exchange (S)
- List of companies based in New York City
- List of stock footage libraries
- List of online image archives
- Silicon Alley
- Stock photography – stock images licensed for specified usages
- Microstock photography – stock images offered using micropayments
