= Media clip =

Short segment of electronic media (either audio or video)

A media clip is a short segment of electronic media, either an audio clip or a video clip.

Media clips may be promotional in nature, as with movie clips. For example, to promote upcoming movies, many actors are accompanied by movie clips on their circuits. Additionally, media clips may be raw materials of other productions, such as audio clips used for sound effects.

== See also ==
- Short-form content
- Soundbite
- Photo op
