= Splash News =

American entertainment news and photography agency

- Type: Subsidiary
- Industry: Entertainment
- Founded: 1990; 36 years ago
- Headquarters: London, United Kingdom
- Products: Candid celebrity photography and video
- Parent: Shutterstock
- Website: splashnews.com

Splash News is an entertainment news agency. The company provides candid celebrity photography and video content for entertainment to print online, and broadcast to media outlets.

Founded in 1990, Splash News has a global network of contributors and has offices in London, New York, Los Angeles, Miami and Berlin.

== History ==
In 2011, Corbis, the digital image company owned by Bill Gates, and formally known as the Branded Entertainment Network, acquired Splash News for an undisclosed amount. In 2016, Branded Entertainment Network sold Splash News to UK Company SilverHub Media. In 2021, the company was forced into Chapter 11 bankruptcy. In May 2022, the company was acquired by Shutterstock

== Business ==
Splash News has been credited with several celebrity stories. Some examples include the first images of Michael Jackson's first child, Tiger Woods' mistress, Sandra Bullock's first public appearance with her newly adopted son, Brittany Spears’ fifty five hour long Las Vegas wedding and Anna Nicole Smith's death in 2007 where Splash were the only agency allowed in the church during the funeral service held in the Bahamas. Almost all of the money made from sales of the funeral images and video were donated to Anna’s and Larry’s daughter. Splash also provided coverage of the 2010 Copiapo Mining Accident in Chile.
