= Henry Wilhelm =

American researcher and author

Henry G. Wilhelm is an American researcher and author known for his studies of the archival properties of photographic printing processes. In 1981, he received a Guggenheim Fellowship in Photographic Studies to continue his work studying photographic processes.

He is the co-author, along with Carol Brower Wilhelm, of the 1993 book The Permanence and Care of Color Photographs: Traditional and Digital Color Prints, Color Negatives, Slides, and Motion Pictures. They are the founders of company Wilhelm Imaging Research.
