= 500px =

Photo sharing website

- Company type: Subsidiary
- Website type: Social Networking
- Headquarters: 20 Duncan Street, Toronto, Ontario, Canada
- Area served: Worldwide
- Owner: Visual China Group
- Founders: Oleg Gutsol; Evgeny Tchebotarev
- Employees: 35
- Website: 500px.com
- Launched: October 31, 2009; 17 years ago
- Current status: Active

500px (pronounced "five hundred px") is a global online photo-sharing platform that is a subsidiary of Visual China Group. It is based in Toronto, Ontario, Canada. It was co-founded by Oleg Gutsol and Evgeny Tchebotarev on October 31, 2009.

== History ==
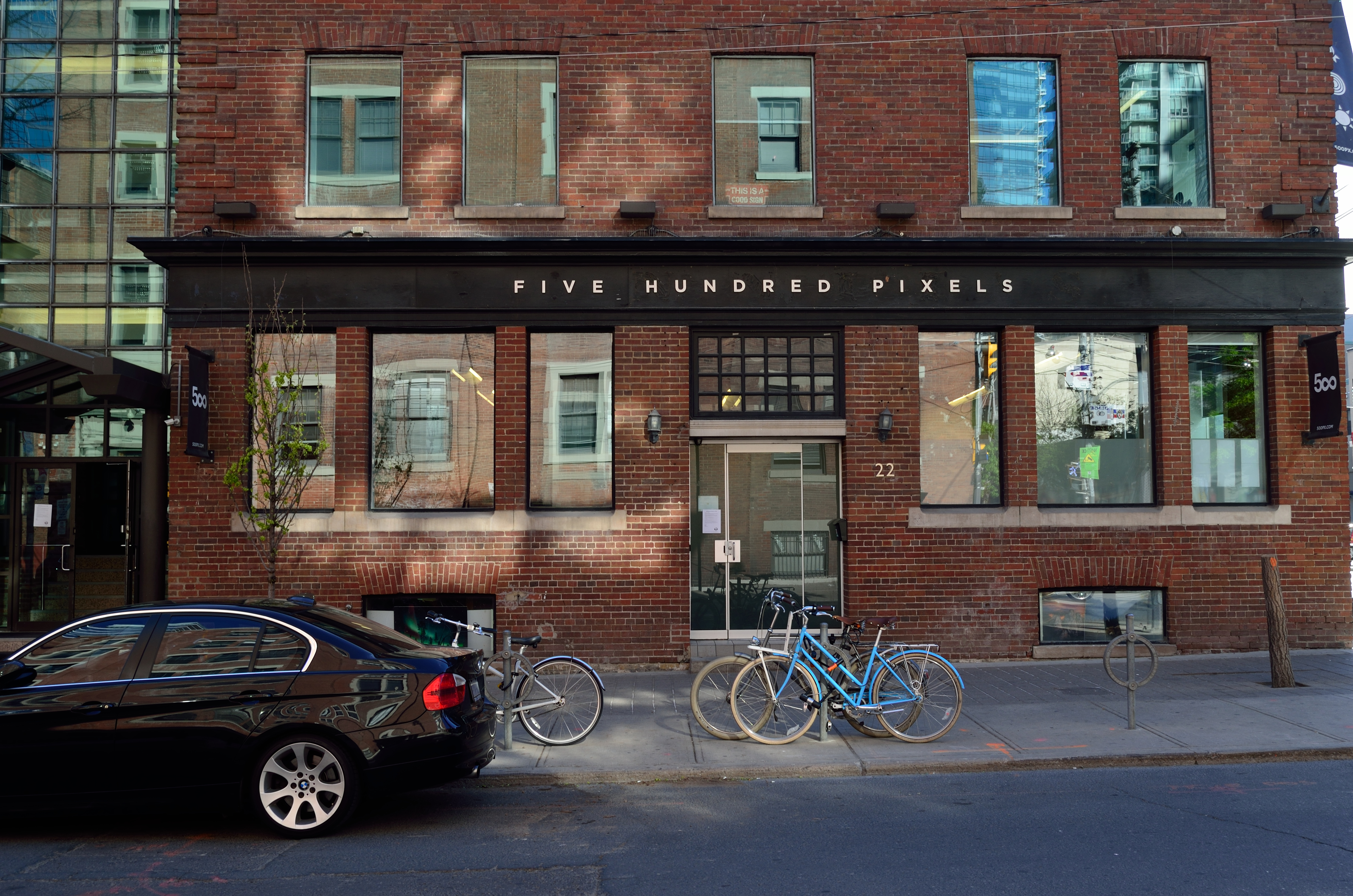
500px headquarters in Toronto

Evgeny Tchebotarev started 500px in 2003 on the social blogging website LiveJournal as a hobby, while he completed a business degree at Ryerson University (now Toronto Metropolitan University). At the time, 500 pixels was considered a good size for web display and was therefore the limit placed on photos submitted to the community for review. Once photographers submitted their photos, they were moderated, and only those of high quality would make it past the community's curators and be published on the site.

Tchebotarev joined forces with Oleg Gutsol and in early 2009, they began work on the mostly automated incarnation of 500px. Image size grew to 900 pixels but the name remained. The two launched the official site on October 31, 2009.

In 2009, the site had 1000 users, purely through word of mouth. By late November 2012, the site had more than 1,500,000 users.

500px's blog was named one of the best blogs of 2012, by Time magazine. On April 12, 2012, 500px's Terms of Service rose to the top of popular site Hacker News, garnering attention for legalese on the left-hand side of the page and summing up the legalese into basic points on the right-hand side. The resulting discussion on the Terms was mixed, with positive feedback such as "awesome" and "one of the cleanest in the industry" alongside negative feedback that believes 500px may have put themselves at undue risk. On January 21, 2013, Apple removed 500px's iPad app from its store, citing concerns of nudity available via the app. Apple restored the app on January 29, following the release of a new version with a "Mature 17+ rating" and a report button.

In July 2015, the company raised $13 million in Series B funding led by a strategic investor, the Visual China Group, and included participation from existing backers of the company.

In August 2015, the company launched a new version of its iOS app.

In November 2016, the company launched 500px Studio, which allows brands to access custom and on-demand photography from 500px's photographers after their launch of a global photographer directory.

In August 2017, 500px announced support for wide-gamut images.

In November 2017, 500px was the recipient of the Deloitte Technology Fast 50 award, which recognizes Canadian companies for their innovation, rapid revenue growth, and entrepreneurial spirit.

On February 26, 2018, 500px was acquired by Visual China Group.

On July 1, 2018, Getty Images became 500px's exclusive distribution partner for licensing outside China, as per its existing agreements with VCG. As a result, 500px Marketplace was shut down on June 30, 2018. The service also discontinued support for publicly-licensed images (such as Creative Commons), citing that the function was underused.

On July 5, 2018, 14.8 million accounts had "partial user data" (including e-mails, personal information, and hashed passwords) leaked via security breaches. 500px reported the breach in February 2019.

== Technology ==
500px has an algorithm in place to evaluate recently uploaded photos that takes views, likes and comments into account and results in a photo's rating or 'Pulse'. The higher the Pulse, the more likely a photo is to reach the site's Popular page, giving it a higher chance of being seen by other users. The algorithm allows all users, not just those with a following, a chance to get their work to the front page of the Popular photos, increasing exposure. This results in the Popular page always displaying fresh content and motivates users to regularly upload new images.

Each user also has an overall rating titled "Affection". Taking into account the likes and favorites they have received across all photos, it is a reliable indication of how popular a photographer is within the community.

Apps for iPhone, iPad, Android, were also made for the site. Versions for Windows Phone 8 and Windows 8 were shut down by the end of April 2015.

== See also ==
- List of photo sharing websites
