= Otto Bettmann =

American archivist (1903–1998)

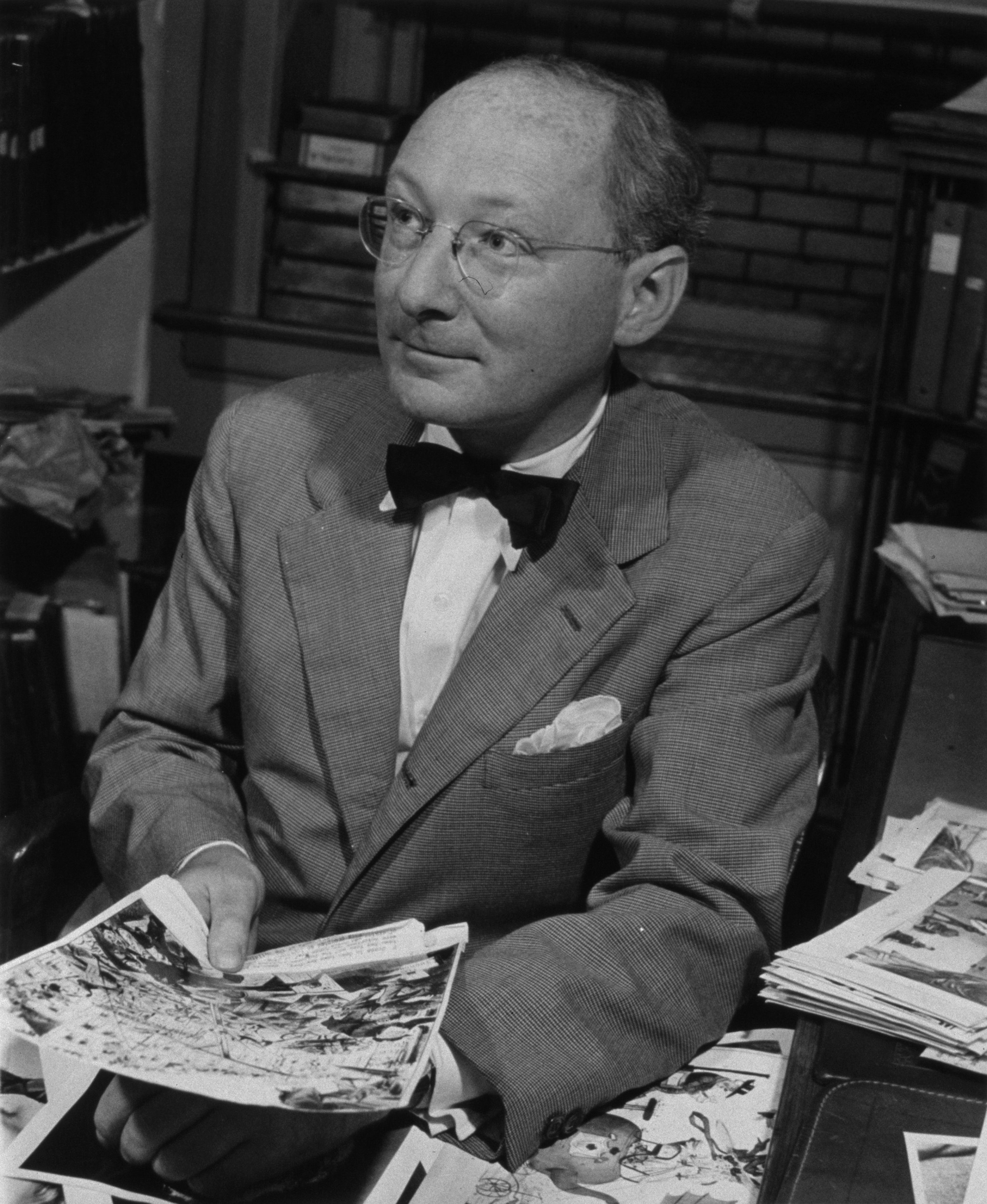
- Bettmann in 1947
- Born: Otto Ludwig Bettmann; October 15, 1903; Leipzig, German Empire
- Died: May 3, 1998 (aged 94); Boca Raton, Florida, U.S.
- Education: Leipzig University
- Occupation: librarian
- Known for: Bettman Archive
- Spouse: Anne Gray

Otto Ludwig Bettmann (October 15, 1903 – May 3, 1998), known as "The Picture Man," was a German-American archivist and librarian who founded the Bettmann Archive. Bettmann is considered to have "virtually invented the image resource business."

== Early life and education ==
Bettmann was born in Leipzig, Germany, to Hans Isidor, an orthopedic surgeon and physician, and Charlotte Bettmann. His parental home was across the road from the Thomaskirche, the church where Johann Sebastian Bach worked as cantor and music director from 1723 to 1750. As a child of Jewish parents, he was unaware that going to a synagogue on Friday and singing the praises of Christ on Sunday was somewhat unusual and continued to participate until his voice changed. His musical talent not limited to voice he studied piano from the age of six. That discipline lasted his entire life, allowing him, at age ninety-three, to still play Bach's Art of Fugue.

He had wanted to be a doctor like his father, but his brother Ernest was already being groomed for that profession. Without his father's support, it would be impossible, and his father had told him many times that one doctor in the family would be enough.

In 1921, he enrolled at the University of Leipzig and studied history, German literature, and philosophy. At that time, a university education consisted of spending time at a number of schools. Otto went to Freiburg for two years, then returned to Leipzig to complete his dissertation. His title, "The Emergence of Professional Ethics in the German Book Trade of the Eighteenth Century" addressed the issue of copyright legislation. In retrospect, this thesis became the raison d'être of his life and his claim to posterity.

== Career ==
After university, he was fortunate to work for a family friend, Henri Hinrichsen, the owner of a music publishing company, C.F. Peters. Looking forward to expanding his business, Hinrichsen planned to open an office in the United States and Otto thought he would manage that branch but was told that he was not aggressive enough to handle the work. Otto quit and moved to Berlin and, in 1929, wrote his first book, Staat und Menschheit (State and Humanity).

Other than the cultural stimulation and excitement of a new independent life, he felt the need to prepare himself for a more stable life and he returned to Leipzig to matriculate in library school. One year later, he had his degree and with that security in hand, made his way back to Berlin. There he worked in the Hunst Bibliothek in charge of the Griesebach collection. Part of this collection was locked in a cabinet because it contained Japanese erotic woodcuts.

As he locked and unlocked the cabinets for scholars and observed the intensity of their desire to see forbidden images, he pondered on the possibility of his own archive. Politically, the time was approaching complete censorship and book burning.

In 1935, he immigrated to the United States from Nazi-controlled Germany, "arriving with a few personal effects and two steamer trunks bursting with photographs, line drawings, engravings, and art reproductions."

In 1936 Bettmann opened an office near Times Square and launched the Bettmann Archive as a commercial picture agency.

He spent the next five decades adding to his collection of images and meeting some of the cultural icons of the times such as Alfred Kinsey, Peter Max, and Stanley Marcus, a diverse collection of people. Artists, musicians, writers and people from all over the world would write to him, often sending little gifts.

In 1974 he published the book The Good Old Days: They Were Terrible! debunking the wrongly nostalgic view of the Gilded Age, describing in vivid detail hazards of pollution, dangerous traffic, low-quality housing, rural hardships, serf-like labor conditions, rampant crime (police corruption endemic), unhealthy food or drink, lack of public health (helped by horrible sanitation problems), brutal education methods with grindingly difficult lessons, slow traveling and even perils in leisure activities which menaced people.

He played Dr. Waxman in the 1983 movie Lovesick.

Bettmann sold the archive in 1981 to Kraus-Thomson.

He moved to Boca Raton, Florida and served as curator of rare books at Florida Atlantic University, in the S. E. Wimberly Library.

== Personal life and death ==
He married Anne Gray who already had three children: Wendel, Mel, and Beverly. Otto was accepted into their family and became the father. He had four grandchildren: Debby, Ellen, Rowie and Julia.

He died on May 3, 1998 at Boca Raton Community Hospital in Boca Raton, Florida.

== Notes ==
(Page not found 4 Feb. 2014 at https://web.archive.org/web/20120101152239/http://corporate.corbis.com/citizenship/bettmann-archive/.)

== Sources ==
- Bettmann, Otto L. A Pictorial History of Medicine. Springfield: Charles C Thomas. 1956.
- Bettmann, Otto L. The Picture Man. Gainesville: University Press of Florida. 1992.
- Greenstein, David; Bang, Katherine Graubard, eds. (1993). Bettmann portable archive (1st ed.). New York: Bettmann. ISBN 978-0-9638093-9-1.
- Bookspan, Martin (1995). "Foreword". Johann Sebastian Bach as His World Knew Him. Secaucus, N.J.: Carol Publishing Group. ISBN 978-1-55972-279-7.
- Thompson, Lana. Personal Correspondence. 1993–1998.
