= Polish cavalry in Sochaczew photograph =

German WWII propaganda photo

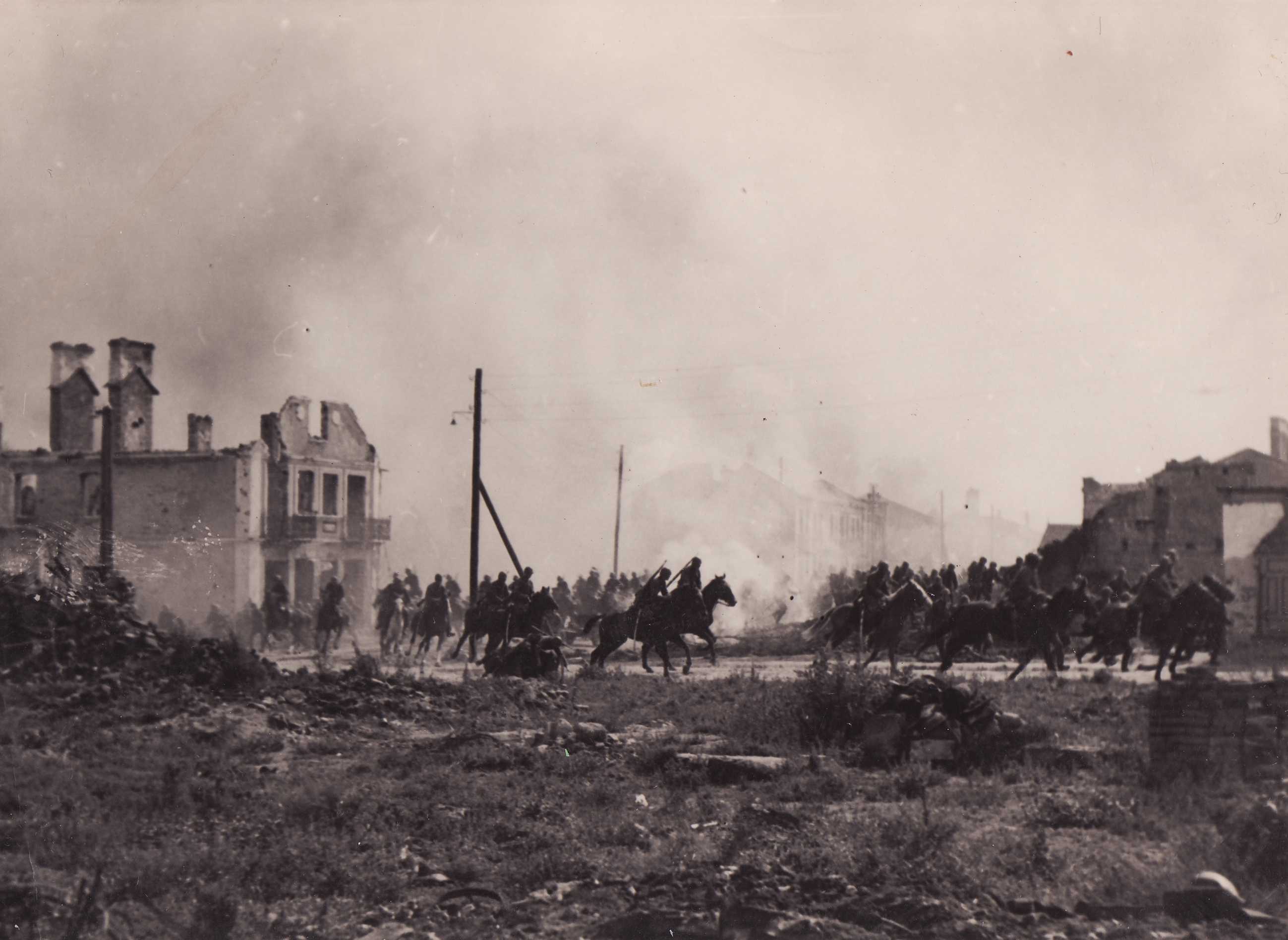
High resolution scan of 5 × 8 cm print

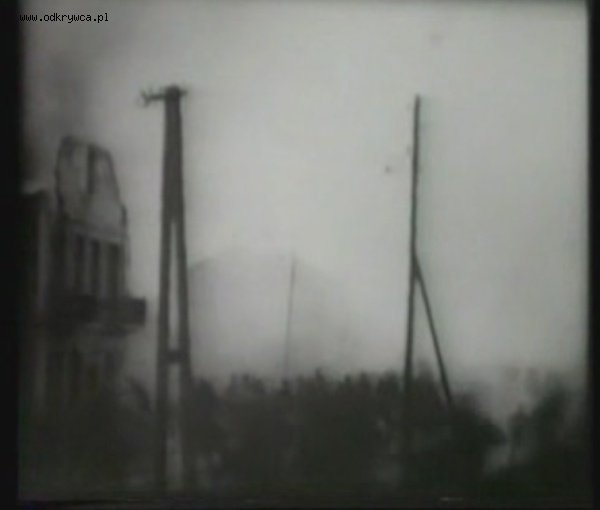
Frame from Kampfgeschwader Lützow showing the same building seen in the "Sochaczew" photograph

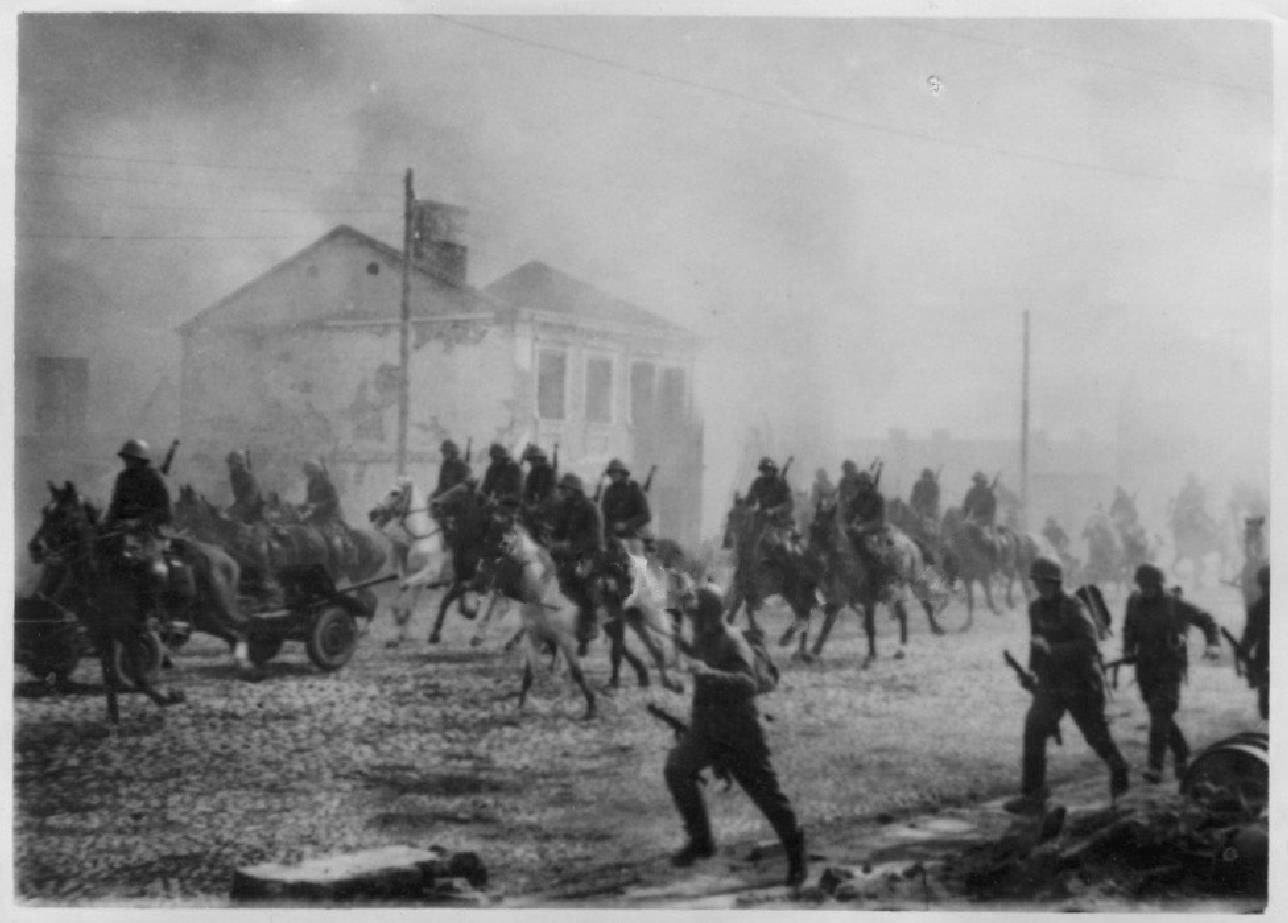
Different photograph taken on the set of Kampfgeschwader Lützow

The Polish cavalry in Sochaczew photograph supposedly depicts the eponymous charge of the Polish cavalry in Sochaczew during the Battle of the Bzura in 1939, but is now believed to have been taken during the filming of Hans Bertram's propaganda movie Kampfgeschwader Lützow in 1940. The photograph is still one of the most widely used depictions of Polish cavalry during the 1939 invasion of Poland.

== Background ==
The provenance of the photograph is unclear, however it is believed to be held by one of the Polish archives and it was published in numerous well-regarded books on the invasion of Poland in 1939. In the 1972 edition of Battles of Polish September ("Bitwy Polskiego Września") by Apoloniusz Zawilski, the photograph was described as "Cavalry in gallop through Sochaczew" (Kawaleria w galopie przez Sochaczew). It was not included in the revised 1989 edition. In the 1982 book Poznań Army in defensive war 1939 ("Armia Poznań w wojnie obronnej 1939") by Piotr Bauer and Bogusław Polak, the photograph was described as the "Poznań Army in fights in Uniejów region". Some publications identify the unit as the Wielkopolska Cavalry Brigade (Wielkopolska Brygada Kawalerii), which was a part of the Poznań Army. The photograph was also featured in numerous other books, textbooks, web publications and news articles. It also can be purchased from several stock photography agencies, like Getty Images and Alamy, which all claim copyrights.

The prints published in books were always of very low resolution; however, once high resolutions scans become available, inconsistencies were noticed between the photograph and the uniforms and customs of Polish cavalry in 1939. The soldiers in the photograph seem to be wearing 1931 or 1932 pattern helmets, while the Polish cavalry used Adrian helmets. Also, the Polish cavalry traditionally wore sabers attached diagonally under the left knee, while soldiers in the photo wear then vertically on the right side. In addition, other inconsistencies between the photograph and Polish army saddle packing regulations and the inability to pinpoint the exact location where the photograph was taken caused many to question its authenticity.

The origin of the photograph was clarified after it was noticed that some of the buildings, uniforms and saddles in the photo match buildings and equipment of soldiers seen in the 1941 German propaganda movie Kampfgeschwader Lützow. The Polish soldiers in Kampfgeschwader Lützow were played by Slovaks and their uniforms and saddles closely match those used by the Slovak army at the beginning of WWII. The scene of the charge of "Polish cavalry" in the movie was shot around Wyszków in 1940. Also, many scenes from the movie were linked to specific locations in that town. The photograph is not a still from the movie, but it was likely taken during its shooting.
