= Jonathan Klein (businessman) =

South African businessman (born 1960)

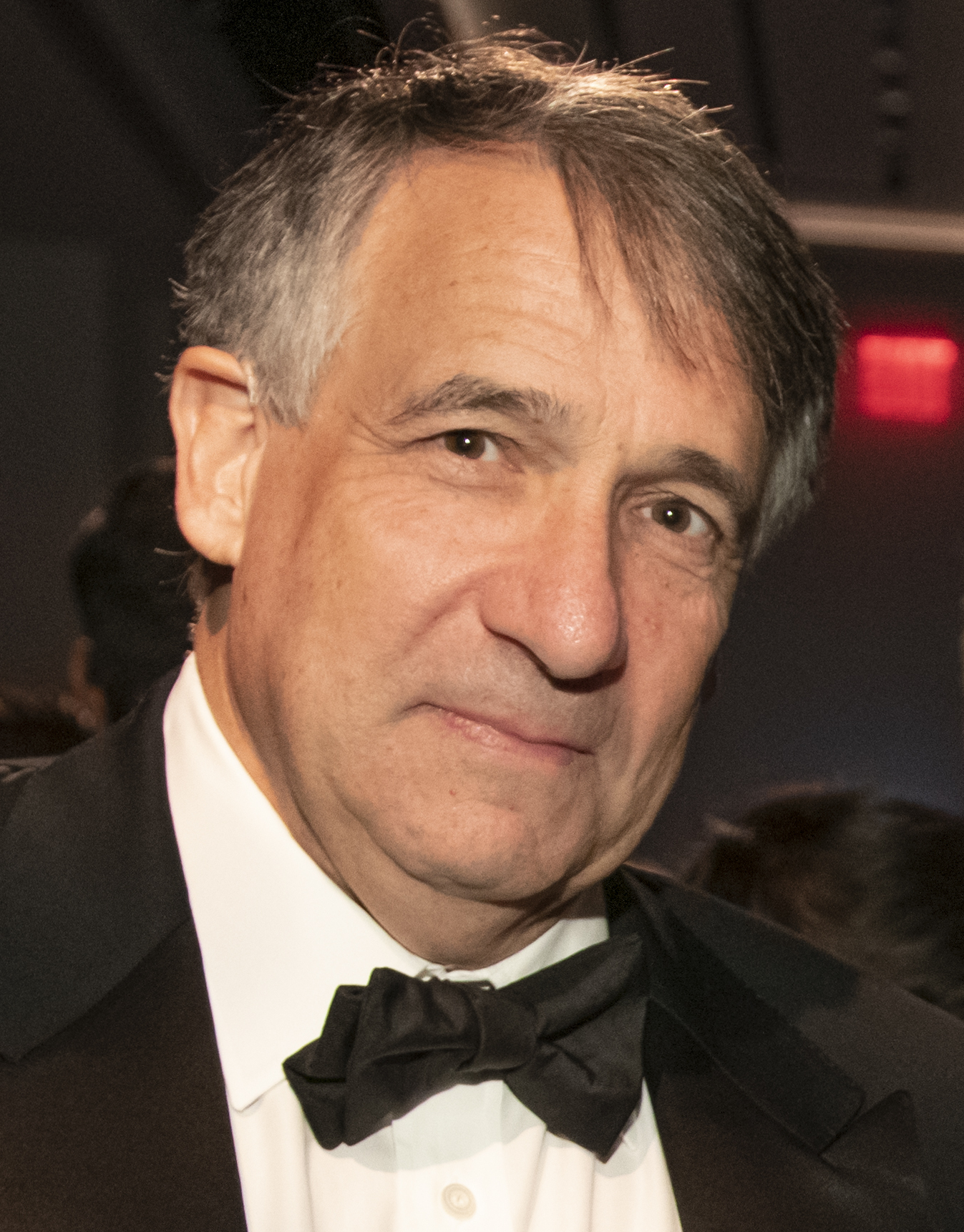
- Klein in 2023
- Born: Jonathan David Klein; 1960 (age 65–66); Johannesburg, South Africa
- Education: University of Cambridge
- Occupation: Businessman
- Known for: Co-founder of Getty Images

Jonathan David Klein (born 1960) is a South African businessman who is the co-founder and chairman of Getty Images, a global digital media company.

== Life and career ==
Born in Johannesburg, South Africa, Klein received a degree in law from Cambridge University. He co-founded Getty Images with former Chairman Mark Getty in March 1995 and since then has led the company's growth from an analog image collection with transparencies, laboratories and print catalogs, to a multibillion-dollar, global digital business.

Under Klein's direction, Getty Images has acquired and integrated more than 100 image collections and companies worldwide, including PhotoDisc and iStockphoto. The company also launched news, sports and entertainment coverage, and has grown to include video, music, digital asset management, rights services and assignment photography.

In 2005, Fast Company recognized Klein in its “Fast 50” as a business leader who “will change the way we work and live” and he was named number one on American Photo's list of the “100 Most Important People in Photography.” He received the Suffolk University Sawyer Business School's 2012 award for Global Leadership in Innovation and Collaboration, as well as the Global Business Coalition on HIV/AIDS, Tuberculosis and Malaria's Business Excellence for Innovation award.

Under Klein's leadership, Getty Images received the first International Center of Photography Trustees Award, for the company's “commitment to the field of photography, through technology and philanthropy, and dedication to the power of photography to create change.”

In 13 March 2015, Klein announced his resignation as CEO and voting member of the Executive Board, internally called, "Ex-Com" . On the same day, it was announced that he intended to accept the role, duties and office of Chairman of The Board. On the same day, it was announced that Klein would stay on as caretaker CEO, taking a prominent role in vetting potential replacements.

Klein spoke out in several interviews and company communiques against the 2015 Charlie Hebdo shooting.

He serves on the boards of directors of the Committee to Protect Journalists and Grassroot Soccer and is chairman of Friends of the Global Fight Against AIDS, Tuberculosis and Malaria. He is a member of the corporate advisory board of GBCHealth and serves on the boards of directors of Bloom & Wild, the Groton School, Etsy, Getty Images, Getty Investments and Squarespace.
