= Unsplash =

Copyright-free stock photography website

- Screenshot
- Company type: Subsidiary
- Website type: Stock photography
- Headquarters: Montreal, Quebec, Canada
- Owner: Getty Images
- Founders: Mikael Cho; Luke Chesser; Stephanie Liverani; Angus Woodman
- Website: unsplash.com
- Registration: Optional
- Launched: May 29, 2013; 13 years ago
- Content license: Free, with exceptions of selling without modification and compiling for a competing service

Unsplash is a website dedicated to proprietary stock photography. Since 2021, it has been owned by Getty Images. The website claims over 330,000 contributing photographers and generates more than 13 billion photo impressions per month on their growing library of over five million photos (as of April 2023).

== History ==
Initially a pioneer of the copyright-free photography model, Unsplash was created in 2013 by Montreal-based entrepreneur Mikael Cho. While creating a new homepage for his company Crew, Cho was unable to find a suitable stock photo and hired a photographer instead. Afterwards, Cho posted the outtakes from his company photoshoot on Tumblr, inviting people to use them as they saw fit. Unsplash received more than 50,000 visits on its first day. Cho supplied the first batch of photos to Unsplash, which then received contributions from amateur and professional photographers. Due to the volume of photo submissions, the site employed an editorial team and "curators" picked from the Unsplash community, including Guy Kawasaki, Nas, Khoi Vinh, Amanda Hesser and Om Malik.

In March 2021, Unsplash was acquired by Getty Images for an undisclosed sum. Unsplash will continue to operate as a standalone brand and division of Getty Images with Cho in charge.

In October 2026, parent company Getty Images announced that it would be going private as part of a restructuring deal with Koch, Inc., which will invest $533 million in the company. As part of the deal, Getty Images announced to its intention to file for prepackaged Chapter 11 bankruptcy protection within the coming weeks, which it did on October 21, 2026.

== Licensing ==
=== Unsplash license ===
Unsplash photos are covered by the Unsplash license. The Unsplash license prevents users from using photos from Unsplash in a similar or competing service. While it gives downloaders the right to "copy, modify, distribute and use the photos for free, including commercial purposes, without asking permission from or providing attribution to the photographer or Unsplash", the Unsplash terms of service prohibit selling unaltered copies, including selling the photos as prints or printed on physical goods.

Content under the Unsplash license cannot be published under a Creative Commons license without additional permissions from the original authors. Unsplash actively prevents authors from offering their content under Creative Commons licenses, for instance by deleting references to such licenses from comments.

In February 2018, Unsplash changed their license terms to restrict the sale of photos without first updating, modifying, or otherwise incorporating new creative elements into the photos, prohibiting selling unaltered copies, including selling the photos as prints or printed on physical goods.

In December 2019, Unsplash for Brands was launched, where advertisers can share branded images on Unsplash.

=== Public domain ===
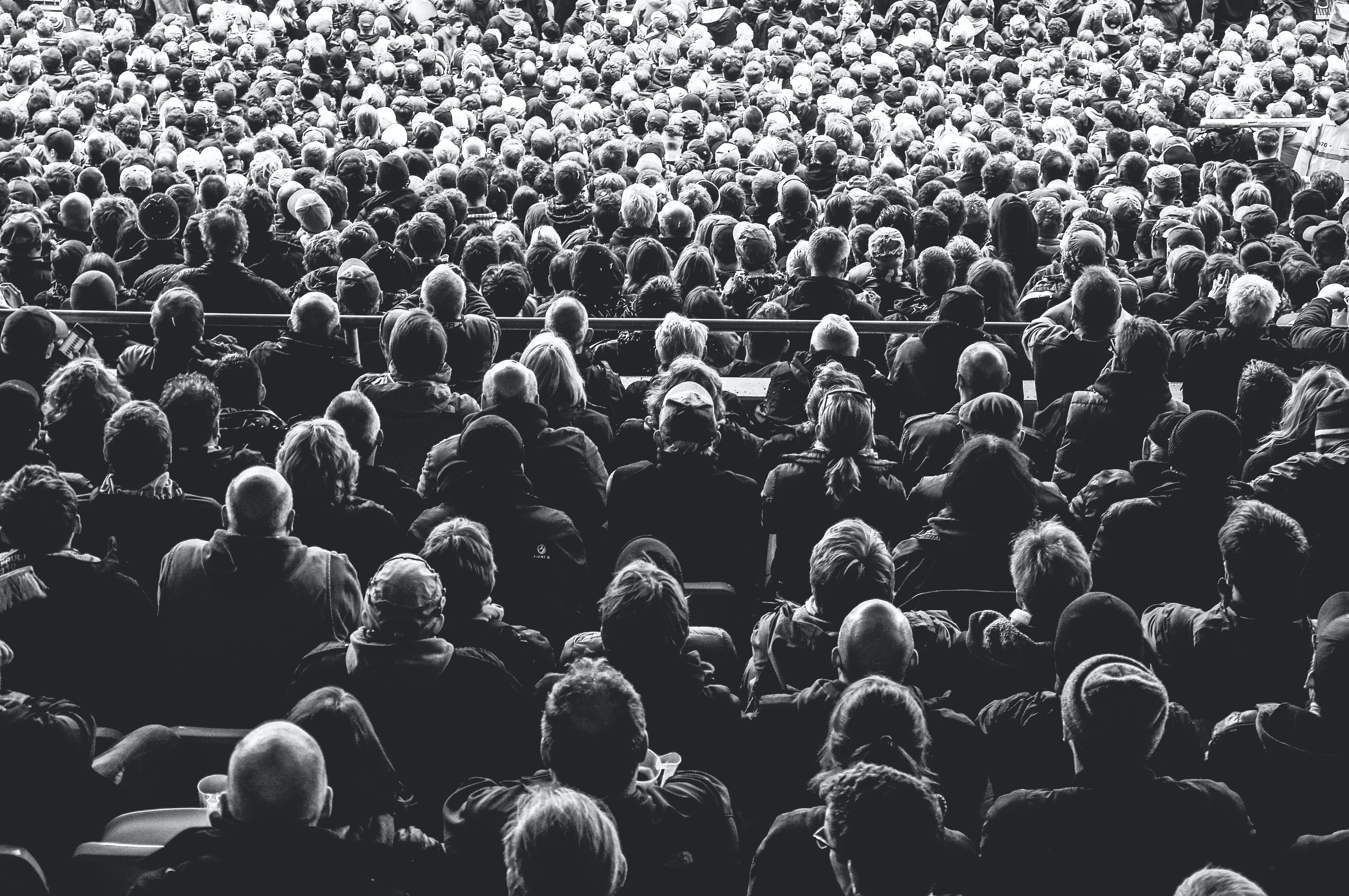
An example of a CC0 image added before the license change. 200,000 other images can only be identified by hand.

Before June 2017, photos uploaded to Unsplash were made available under the Creative Commons zero license, which is a public domain equivalent license and a waiver, which irrevocably allowed individuals to freely reuse, repurpose and remix photos for their own projects. Initially, the permissive copyright terms on its photos led to Unsplash becoming one of the largest photography suppliers on the internet, with its members' photos frequently appearing on articles.

In June 2017, Unsplash changed the license under which they made their content available to their own license, the Unsplash License, which imposes some additional restrictions. Around 200,000 images were lost to the public domain. It is not possible to find which images had been available as CC0 prior to the license change. At the time of the license change, Creative Commons Director Ryan Merkley asked Unsplash to "either a) properly mark all the works shared using CC0 and/or b) make available a full archive of the CC0 works so they can be shared on a platform that supports open licensing".

== Other products ==
In addition to its website, Unsplash provides a public application programming interface (API) that answers more than 3.8 billion photo requests per month.

In 2016, while still a CC0 business, Unsplash released the Unsplash Book, the world's "first ever fully crowd-sourced" book. The book's photos, essays, and funding were all contributed by Unsplash's community. The book raised $106,000 on Kickstarter and included contributions from Harvard law professor and CC0 inventor Lawrence Lessig, and designer Tobias van Schneider.

Beyond its website and API, Unsplash has hosted photo walks in cities around the world including Tokyo, Montreal, Toronto and Boston. The photo walks are hosted by guides from the Unsplash community who show participants the best places to take photos in their city, how to use their cameras, and how to compose better photos.

In October 2022, Unsplash launched Unsplash+, a subscription for access to features, expanded legal protections, and access to content monetized by their authors.
