= Bigstock =

Stock photography website

- Type: Subsidiary
- Industry: Stock photography
- Genre: Microstock photography
- Founded: September 28, 2004; 22 years ago
- Headquarters: New York City, U.S.
- Area served: Worldwide
- Number of employees: 2,700 (2015)
- Parent: Shutterstock
- Website: www.bigstockphoto.com

Bigstock is an online royalty-free, international microstock photography website that sells images via a credit-based system. Bigstock's photos, vectors and illustrations cost from between 1 and 6 credits each, depending on size, with credits ranging from $.90 to US$3.00. BigStockPhoto was founded in Davis, California, in the fall of 2004. Bigstock adds to its library every day as photographers and designers from around the world submit their work. As of June 2015, Bigstock had more than 25 million royalty-free images (photos, vectors and illustrations) available.

On September 23, 2009, Bigstock announced that it had been purchased by Shutterstock, a subscription-based microstock company.

In January 2025, it was announced that the company would be merging with Getty Images, and in July 2026 this merger was cancelled following intervention from the Competition and Market Authority in the UK.

As of July 1, 2023 Bigstock was no longer accepting new content submissions. Shutterstock, the owner of BigStock was in the process of merging with Getty Images, as of January 2025. On November 16th 2026, it was announced that BigStock would close to customers on December 8, 2026 and customers and content providers were directed to Shutterstock.com.

== See also ==
- Stock photography
- Category:Stock photographers
