= PhotoDisc =

Defunct American stock image company

PhotoDisc, Inc.
- Industry: Photography
- Founded: 1991; Seattle, Washington, U.S.
- Defunct: 1997
- Fate: Merged to form Getty Images
- Headquarters: Seattle, Washington, U.S.
- Key people: Tom Hughes Mark Torrance Mark Callaghan
- Products: Stock photography
- Website: www.photodisc.com

PhotoDisc, Inc. based in Seattle, was a publisher of digital stock photography free of royalties. It was founded in 1991 by Tom Hughes, Mark Callaghan and Mark Torrance, who later became the chief executive officer and chairman. After receiving the catalog in the mail, customers would write or phone the office and order the photos or pre-made collections by charter artists Clement Mok or Nick Koudis which would then be shipped to them on CD-ROM. In the fall of 1995, their website was launched making business more convenient as it was no longer necessary to wait for shipping as photos could be downloaded directly from the website, the catalog option was still available, though. In September 1997, PhotoDisc agreed to combine with London-based Getty Communications to form the Seattle-based Getty Images. In February 1998, at the closure of the acquisition, PhotoDisc's library amounted to 60,000 images.
