= Getty Designs =

Image website

Getty Design
- Website type: Interior design photo bank
- Available in: English
- Owner: Getty Corp
- Creator: CosmoSun
- Website: GettyDesigns.com
- Commercial: Yes
- Launched: December 2004
- Current status: Inactive

Getty Designs is an image website, web services suite, and online community platform. In addition to being a popular website for sharing interior design photographs, the service is widely used by designers as a photo repository. Its popularity has been fueled by its organization tools that allow photos to be tagged and browsed by folksonomic means. Getty Designs is the world's latest interior design photo bank. It claims to host more than 1 million images.

== History ==
Getty Designs was developed by CosmoSun, a MSC Malaysia Status company that launched Getty Designs in December 2004. The service emerged from tools originally created for Cosmo's, a web-based software developer.

Early versions of Getty Designs focused on an images library with photo exchange capabilities. There was also an emphasis on collecting images found on the web rather than photographs taken by users. The successive evolutions focused more on the uploading and filing backend for individual users and the exchange function was buried in the site map.

In February 2008, Property2u acquired Getty Designs. During the week of, all content was migrated to Property2u server in Malaysia, resulting in all data being subject to Law of the Malaysia.

In July 2008, Getty designs updated its services from Free Photo Exchange Portal to Interior Design Photo Bank with more commercial benefit to user/members. This upgraded version of Getty Designs require membership registration with minimum subscription, along with a design and structural overhaul. For all intents and purposes, the current version is considered a stable release.

In August 2008 upload limits on member account were increased to unlimited (originally a 1GB per month limit).

== Features ==
=== Organization ===
Getty Designs asks photo submitters to organize images using tags (a form of metadata), which allow searchers to find images concerning a certain topic such as place name or subject matter. Getty Designs provide access to images tagged with the most popular keywords. Because of its support for tags.

Images can be posted to the user's collection via email attachments. Getty Designs has increasingly been adopted by many designers as their primary photo storage site.

=== Filtering ===
In August 2008, Getty Design introduced mandatory filtering of all photos and a process of central review of photos by staff to set levels of appropriateness. By default all Getty Designs accounts are set to the status appropriate for a general public.

The filter system of Getty Designs assumes that photos may be unsafe and should not be public until a staff person has validated that the material is safe. Until this happens, which could take up to a week/month, material cannot be viewed by persons without a valid Getty Designs account.

=== Categories ===
- Asian interior
- Attic and ceiling design
- Balcony photos
- Bathroom design
- Bedroom design
- Building architecture
- Condominium design
- Curtain photos
- Dining room design
- Entertainment space
- Exhibition and display
- Facade design
- Flower arrangement
- Furniture design
- Hall space planning
- Home decoration
- Hotel photo
- Illustration / artist impression
- Kids room
- Kitchen design
- Landscape design
- Living room design
- Lounge photos
- Office space
- Pool design
- Porch / veranda
- Restaurant design
- Roof design
- Shop design
- Spa and saloon design
- Staircase design
- Study area design
- Yard / void usage
- Gardening
