= Wilhelm Imaging Research =

American photographic company

- Industry: Photography; Digital printing
- Founded: 1995; 31 years ago
- Founder: Henry Wilhelm; Carol Brower
- Website: wilhelm-research.com

Wilhelm Imaging Research is an American company with expertise in the permanence of photographic and digital printing materials. It provides testing services and conservation advice.

It was started in 1995 by Henry Wilhelm and Carol Brower, who in 1993 had together written a book on photograph preservation, The Permanence and Care of Color Photographs: Traditional and Digital Color Prints, Color Negatives, Slides, and Motion Pictures.
