= Jon Oringer =

American businessman (born 1974)

Jonathan E. Oringer
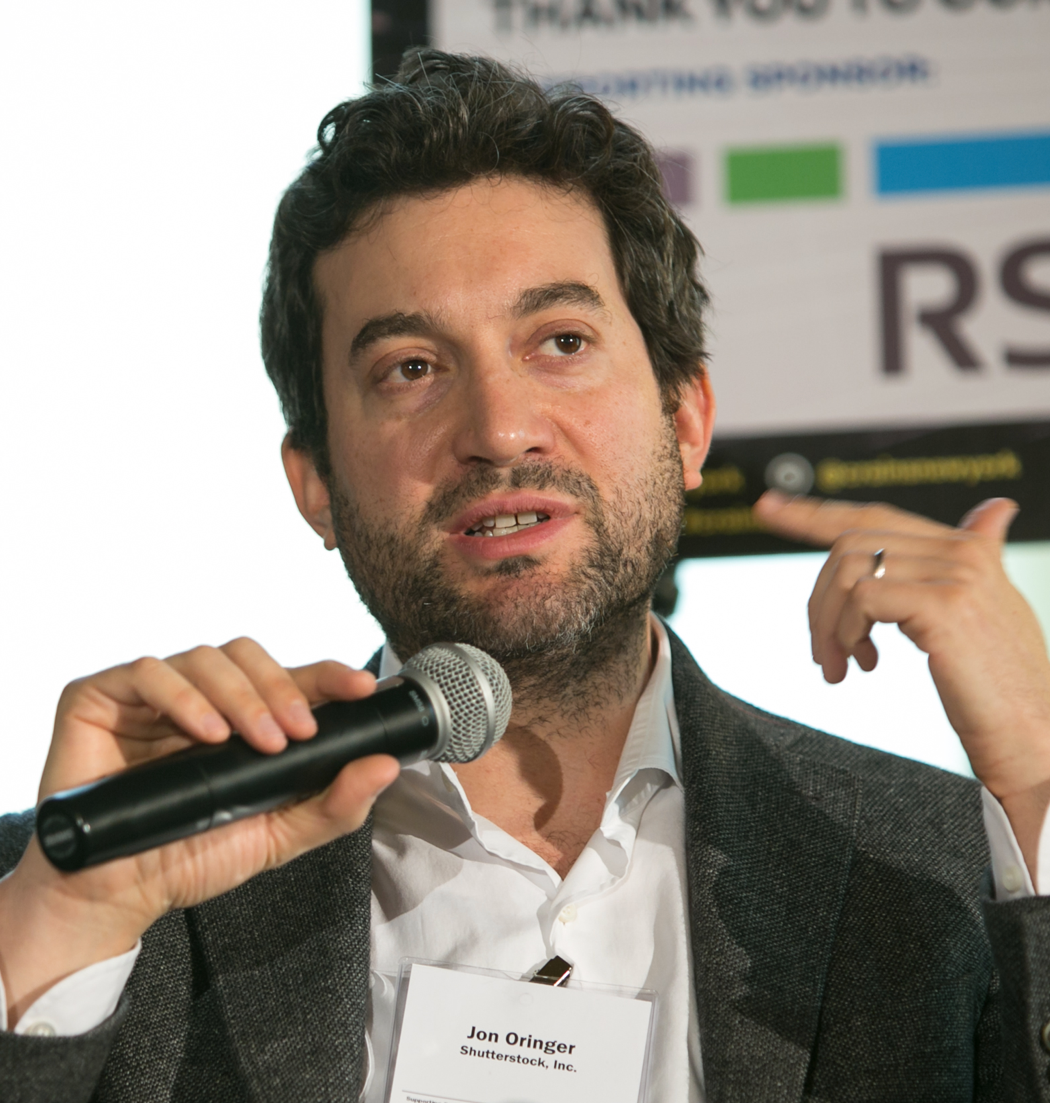
- Oringer in 2020
- Born: May 2, 1974 (age 52); Scarsdale, New York, U.S.
- Education: Stony Brook University; Columbia University
- Title: Founder and CEO, Shutterstock
- Website: JonOringer.com

Jon Oringer (born May 2, 1974) is an American programmer, photographer, and billionaire businessman, best known as the founder and CEO of Shutterstock, a stock media company headquartered in New York City. Oringer started his career while a college student in the 1990s, when he created "one of the Web's first pop-up blockers." He went on to found about ten small startups that used a subscription method to sell "personal firewalls, accounting software, cookie blockers, trademark managers," and other small programs.

In 2003, Oringer founded Shutterstock to provide microstock photography, which has been publicly traded on the New York Stock Exchange since 2012. As a result of going public, in 2013 Oringer was reported to be New York's first tech billionaire. Shutterstock had over 100,000 contributors as of March 2016, with an "active customer base of 1.4 million people in 150 countries." Among other accolades, in 2012 Oringer was named New York's Technology Entrepreneur of the Year by Ernst & Young, and the following year Oringer was recognized as one of Crain's New York 40 Under 40.

== Early life and education ==
Jon Oringer was born in 1974 in Scarsdale, New York, where he spent his childhood. Oringer is Jewish. He began learning computer programming in elementary school, using his Apple IIe to code "simple games and plug-ins for bulletin board systems." As he grew older he also developed his own photos as a hobby. Attending Scarsdale High School from 1988 to 1992, by the age of fifteen Oringer was teaching guitar lessons, later moving on to fixing computers out of his parents house when he realized it was more lucrative.

Oringer started selling his own software products over the internet when he began attending Stony Brook University in 1993, inventing and selling thousands of copies of what Forbes describes as "one of the Web's first pop-up blockers." After graduating with a BS in computer science and mathematics in 1997, from 1996 to 1998 he studied computer science at Columbia University, graduating with an MS. While enrolled at Columbia he continued "trying to create products to complement the pop-up blocker," using a subscription model to sell "personal firewalls, accounting software, cookie blockers, trademark managers," and other small programs. Oringer estimates that he founded about ten small startup companies, most of which had Oringer as the sole employee.

== Career ==
=== Founding Shutterstock ===
While marketing his software through a mailing list, Oringer realized that emails with photos were better received than emails without. Finding it difficult to find affordable generic stock photos online, in 2003 he purchased a Canon Rebel camera to take pictures for a new stock-photo marketplace that catered to advertisers and "microstock photography." Oringer went on to take about 100,000 of his own images over six months, eventually posting a culled collection of 30,000 images to a new website he named Shutterstock. Funding Shutterstock entirely with his savings, Oringer rented a 600-square-foot office in New York for the company and initially handled all roles himself, including customer service. Like his previous projects he made the photographs available via subscription, with unlimited downloads and a monthly starting fee of US$49. He also advertised Shutterstock on platforms such as Google AdWords.

Initially hiring friends to serve as models for the stock photos, Oringer later hired a photo director to organize shoots for the company. When demand exceeded his photo supply, he became an agent and hired additional contributors, also hiring a team of reviewers to ensure "editorial consistency and quality."

=== IPO ===
In May 2012, Oringer brought Shutterstock public after filing for an initial public offering on the New York Stock Exchange, which it completed on October 17, 2012. After going public, Oringer continued to own about 55 percent of Shutterstock, largely through the investment company Pixel Holdings. Stock value over the ensuing year increased considerably, and on June 28, 2013, Andre Sequin, an analyst at RBC Capital Market, announced Oringer as the "first billionaire to come out of Silicon Alley - New York's thriving tech sector." His net wealth at the time was estimated at US$1.05 billion.

=== Recent developments ===
In 2014, Oringer spoke at 2014 Class Day at the Columbia University School of Engineering and Applied Science. After maintaining its New York headquarters for years in a Wall Street office, in March 2014 Oringer relocated Shutterstock to the Empire State Building.

In January 2015, Oringer oversaw Shutterstock's acquisition of both Rex Features, Europe's largest independent photo press agency, and PremiumBeat, a stock music and sound effects service.

Following Shutterstock's decision to implement a tool to censor results in China, Oringer defended the company's decision when faced with an employee petition against the system.

In February 2020, Oringer announced that he would be stepping down as Shutterstock CEO effective April 2020, and would become executive chairman.

== Awards and recognition ==
Oringer has been recognized with a number of business awards, and in 2009 he was selected 41st on the Silicon Alley 100, an annual list of the 100 most influential entrepreneurs, investors, executives, and technologists in Manhattan. Business Insider named Oringer the coolest person in all of New York technology in 2013. Oringer was recognized in June 2012 as New York's Technology Entrepreneur of the Year by Ernst & Young, and the following year Oringer was recognized as one of Crain's New York class of 2013 40 Under 40.

== Personal life ==
Based in West Village in Manhattan, around 2012 Oringer became a certified commercial helicopter pilot.

In 2020, Oringer paid $42 million for a Miami Beach mansion, marking a record on North Bay Road, only eclipsed in 2024 by David and Victoria Beckham.
