= Dribbble =

Design website

- Logo used since 2023
- Available in: English
- Headquarters: Walnut Creek, California, U.S.
- Owner: Dribbble Holdings Ltd. (direct owner: Tiny)
- Creators: Founders: Dan Cederholm and Rich Thornett; CEO: Zack Onisko
- Revenue: $16,000,000 (2022)
- Employees: 339 (2022)
- Website: www.dribbble.com
- Commercial: Yes
- Users: >16,000,000
- Current status: Active

Dribbble is a self-promotion and social networking platform for digital designers. It serves as a design portfolio platform, jobs and recruiting site, and a platform for designers to share their work online.

While Dribbble is a geographically distributed company with all employees being remote workers, its headquarters is located at Walnut Creek, California.

== History ==
In 2009, Dan Cederholm and Rich Thornett beta-launched Dribbble as an invite-only site where designers shared what they were working on: “The name Dribbble came about from the dual metaphors of bouncing ideas and leaking your work.” The first "Shot" (a small screenshot of a designer's work in progress) was posted by the user "Cederholm" on July 9, 2009. In March 2010, Dribbble was made publicly available with new members requiring invitations.

Over the years, features were added such as API integration, Attachments, Player Stats, and Pro (an elevated, paid profile). It launched the following:

- A designer job board,
- Team accounts
- A design podcast called "Overtime"
- A customizable portfolio product called "Playbook".

In January 2017, Dribbble was acquired by Tiny (holding company), a family of internet startup companies, and Zack Onisko was appointed CEO. 2017 saw its first in-person designer conference: Hang Time, since hosted in Boston (2017), Seattle (2018), Los Angeles (2018), and New York.

In April 2017, Dribbble acquired the freelancer platform Crew.

In 2018, the site added a video feature. The site also continued to expand its reach with 144 meet-ups in 43 countries, with more than 8,000 designers in attendance. As of 2024, the firm's remote team is composed of 29 employees. The site is used in 195 countries worldwide and the website is visited by more than 4 million people each month. (2017)

== Awards ==
- Inc. 5000: Fastest-Growing Private Companies in America (2018 and 2019)
- Webby Awards: Honoree, Best Website – Community (2019)
- CSS Design Awards: Best UI Design, Best UX Design, Best Innovation (2019)
- Inc. 5000: Fastest-Growing Private Companies in America (2018)
