= Video clip (online media) =

Snippets of a video uploaded on the Internet

A video clip is a form of a short video that involves a small portion of a longer recording of a video (often from various sources such as movies (from both professional and amateur sources), television shows or entertainment videos) that is uploaded onto the Internet.

Video clips are popular among certain groups of people, especially young ones (specifically those of Millennials (aka Generation Y), Generation Z and Alpha), shaping modern Internet culture. Video clips emerged during the early days of the World Wide Web in the 1990s before growing in popularity in the 2000s with the creation of video sharing sites such as YouTube.

Video clips can be of any format, whether as standard video (using any available video resolution) or vertical video, and can be up to several minutes long depending on the content being used. Such content may include internet memes, out-of-context snippets, and many others. They can also be used to attract the public to the user's other accounts or other long-form contents.

The term is also used more loosely to mean any video program, including a full program, uploaded onto a website or other medium.

== On the Internet ==
With the spread of global high-speed internet access in the 2000s, video clips have gained popularity online. By mid-2006 there were millions of video clips available online on sites like YouTube, with new websites springing up focusing entirely on offering free video clips to users. Many established corporate sites added the ability to clip existing video content on their websites.

While most of this content is non-exclusive and available on competing sites, some companies produce their own videos and do not need to rely on the work of outside companies or amateurs.

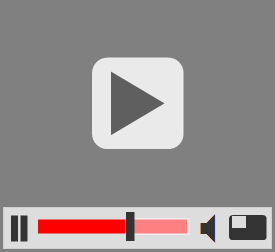
A detailed icon for video e.g. to link to video content on a website

While some video clips are taken from established media sources, community and individually produced clips are more common. Some individuals host their created works on vlogs (video blogs) and the use of Internet video clips as they became bigger grew swiftly. Between March and July 2006, YouTube grew from 30 to 100 million views of videos per day. One of the developments during that period were the BBC's iPlayer, which was released for open beta testing in July 2007.

=== Advertising ===
Video clips are a common form of advertising. With online entertainment sites delivering television programming content, free of charge, online video entertainment rose substantially in popularity. Video clips are also used in advertising by vloggers to promote products. The average ad goes for 15–30 seconds.

=== Rise of amateurs ===
Unlike traditional movies largely dominated by studios, video clips are supplied by non-professionals.

In 2005, Chinese students Huang Yixin and Wei Wei, later known as "Back Dorm Boys", lip-synced to a song by the Backstreet Boys in a video uploaded to some clip websites and quickly became renowned. They appeared on television shows and concerts, and they were also granted a contract by a media company in Beijing, China for lip-syncing.

In May 2006, The Economist reported that 90% of video clips on YouTube came from amateurs, a few of whom were young comedians. It, in effect, also brought up amateur talents.

An earlier celebrity was David Elsewhere, who was a talent at popping and liquiding. His performance to Kraftwerk's song Expo 2000 at the Kollaboration talent show in 2001 was widely viewed on the Internet, and this subsequently led to him being hired for TV commercials and music videos. Not only did video clips submerge into the world of TV commercials and music videos, but it also became a popular form of entertainment and a hobby for people called "Vloggers" (video blog creators).

=== Citizen journalism ===
Citizen journalism video reporting dates back as early as the development of camcorders, but all videos were screened by the local media outlets of the time. This was until its spread was aided by free upload websites in which censorship was limited to make a vast number of videos available to anyone who wanted to view them. Scenes were rarely broadcast on television, and many first-witnessed scenes have since become publicly available.

Notably, in December 2004, tourist videos of the Indian Ocean earthquake and tsunami offered worldwide audiences the first scenes of the disaster.

=== Vlog ===
From late 2005 to early 2006, a new form of blogging emerged called a vlog. It is a blog that takes video as the primary content, which is often accompanied by supporting text, image, and additional metadata to provide context. Su Li Walker, an analyst with the Yankee Group, said that "like blogs, which have become an extension of traditional media, video blogs will be a supplement to traditional broadcasting". Regular entries are typically presented in reverse chronological order.

=== Convergence with traditional media ===
The evolving market for video clips garnered interest from traditional movie studios. In 2006, the producers of Lucky Number Slevin, a film with Morgan Freeman, Lucy Liu and Bruce Willis, made an 8-minute clip for YouTube. Celebrities in traditional media have proven to confer more popularity in clip culture than most amateur video makers.

== See also ==
- Timeline of online video
- List of Internet phenomena
- Internet meme
- Media clip
- Screencast
- Video evidence
- Video sharing
- Quoting out of context
- Short-form content
