= Visual China Group =

Chinese photo and media agency

Visual China Group Co., Ltd.
- Type: Public
- Traded as: SZSE: 000681
- Industry: Stock photos
- Founded: 2000; 26 years ago
- Headquarters: Beijing, China
- Subsidiaries: 500px
- Website: www.vcg.com

Visual China Group Co., Ltd. (VCG) is a Chinese photo and media agency. Established in 2000, it is a supplier of stock multimedia content to the commercial media industry. VCG is currently the largest stock image and media footage provider in China and third largest in the world.

Since 2006, VCG has been the exclusive distributor of Getty Images' library in China. In January 2016, Unity Glory International, an affiliate of VCG, announced that it would acquire the image licensing business of Corbis. Unity Glory licenses the Corbis libraries to Getty for distribution outside of China via VCG. In early 2018, it acquired photo sharing website 500px.

== False copyright claims ==
In April 2019, after the Event Horizon Telescope project captured an image of the Messier 87 supermassive black hole — the first such image in history — it was discovered that VCG had falsely claimed ownership of the image and listed it for sale on its website, failing to attribute its source (which had licensed it for free distribution and use under a Creative Commons license). The attempt to monetize a historic image meant for public distribution was criticized as being opportunist.

On the heels of the controversy, Sina Weibo users (including the Communist Youth League of China) discovered other images that VCG was also claiming ownership of and selling, including corporate logos, and imagery of the Chinese flag and national emblem. On 11 April 2019, VCG was ordered by authorities in Tianjin to address these issues. The next day, VCG stated that it had "taken down all non-compliant photos and closed down the site voluntarily for a revamp in accordance with related laws." The controversy caused its share prices to fall by 10% for three consecutive working days.
