= Getty Images =

American visual media company

Getty Images Holdings, Inc.
- Type: Private
- Traded as: NYSE: GETY
- Industry: Publishing; media; web design
- Genre: Stock photography
- Predecessors: Getty Communications; PhotoDisc
- Founded: 14 March 1995; 31 years ago (as Getty Investments, LLC.)
- Founders: Mark Getty; Jonathan Klein
- Headquarters: Seattle, Washington, U.S.
- Area served: Worldwide
- Key people: Mark Getty (chairman); Craig Peters (CEO); Jennifer Leyden (CFO)
- Products: Digital images; audio; video
- Services: Rights-managed and royalty-free images, audio, and video
- Revenue: ▼US$917 million (2023)
- Operating income: ▼US$128 million (2023)
- Net income: ▲US$19.6 million (2023)
- Total assets: ▲US$2.60 billion (2023)
- Total equity: ▲US$681 million (2023)
- Owner: Getty family (36.7%)
- Number of employees: c. ~1,700 (2023)
- Divisions: Getty Productions
- Subsidiaries: iStock; Unsplash; Photos.com
- Website: gettyimages.com

Getty Images Holdings, Inc. (stylized as gettyimages) is an American visual media company and supplier of stock images, editorial photography, video, and music for businesses and consumers, with a library of over 477 million assets. It targets three markets—creative professionals (advertising and graphic design), the media (print and online publishing), and corporate (in-house design, marketing and communication departments).

Getty Images has distribution offices around the world and capitalizes on the Internet for distribution with over 2.3 billion searches annually on its sites. As Getty Images has acquired other older photo agencies and archives, it has digitized their collections, enabling online distribution. Getty Images operates a large commercial website that clients use to search and browse for images, purchase usage rights, and download images. Image prices vary according to resolution and type of rights. The company also offers custom photo services for corporate clients.

In October 2026, Getty Images announced that it would be going private and filed for prepackaged Chapter 11 bankruptcy, as part of a restructuring deal with Koch, Inc.

== History ==
In 1995, Mark Getty and chief executive officer Jonathan Klein co-founded Getty Investments LLC in London. Mark Getty is the company's chairman.

In September 1997, Getty Communications, as it was called at the time, merged with PhotoDisc, Inc. to form Getty Images. The company relocated to Seattle two years later and expanded in the United States, reaching 2,000 employees by 2006. In April 2003, Getty Images entered into a partnership with Agence France-Presse (AFP) to market each other's images.

Getty Images acquired the Michael Ochs Archives in February 2007. The Michael Ochs Archives were described by The New York Times as "the premier source of musician photography in the world".

In 2008, the private equity firm Hellman & Friedman (H&F) acquired Getty Images for $2.4 billion. In 2012, H&F put Getty up for sale. As of the ensuing sale to Carlyle Group, the company was said to have an archive that included 80 million stills and illustrations. The company was acquired by the Getty family in 2018.

The company moved to its current headquarters, in the Union Station office complex in Seattle's International District, in 2011.

In 2015, Jonathan Klein became the company's chairman, and Dawn Airey was hired as chief executive officer (CEO) of Getty Images. Airey remained in the role until 31 December 2018, at which time she became a non-executive director member of its board and Craig Peters was appointed CEO.

In 2019, Getty Images introduced Market Freeze, simplifying the exclusivity of rights-managed images. Later that year, it announced that due to customers' changing needs, it plans to phase out rights-managed imagery by 2020 in favor of royalty-free images.

In December 2021, Getty Images announced its intention to become publicly traded once more through a combination with CC Neuberger Principal Holdings II. In July 2022, the SPAC merger was completed, and the newly formed parent company of Getty Images went public on the New York Stock Exchange under the symbol GETY.

The company's share price peaked in August 2022 at over $30, falling to less than $5 by October 2022. Activist investor Trillium Capital made an unsolicited bid to acquire Getty for US$4 billion in April 2023 – representing nearly a 100 percent premium. Getty turned down the offer, questioning its credibility.

In September 2023, Getty announced that it was partnering with Nvidia to launch Generative AI by Getty Images, a new tool that lets people create images using Getty's library of licensed photos. Getty will use Nvidia's Edify model, which is available on Nvidia's generative AI model library, Picasso.

In January 2025, it was announced that the company would be merging with Shutterstock. The UK's Competition and Markets Authority launched an investigation into the proposed merger in August 2025.

In 2025, Getty sued Stability AI, alleging it unlawfully copied and processed millions of copyrighted images to train its image-generation technology. The High Court sided with Stability in a November 2025 ruling. The case was heard at the Court of Appeal in November 2026.

In February 2026, the United States Department of Justice concluded its review and granted unconditional antitrust clearance for the merger under the Hart-Scott-Rodino Act. Getty Images reported record full-year 2025 revenue of $981.3 million, the highest in the company's 30-year history.

In March 2026, the company issued a 'going concern' warning, stating that it is high in debt driven by costly measures such as merging with Shutterstock and several legal disputes, as well as company irrelevance driven by the steep rise of artificial intelligence.

In July 2026, Getty Images moved to terminate its planned $3.7 billion merger with Shutterstock after the UK Competition and Markets Authority required Shutterstock to divest its global editorial business as a condition for approval. Getty’s board voted unanimously not to proceed with the divestiture process, effectively ending the deal unless circumstances changed before July 7, 2026.

In October 2026, the company announced that it would be going private as part of a restructuring deal with Koch, Inc., which will invest $533 million in the company. As part of the deal, Getty Images announced to its intention to file for prepackaged Chapter 11 bankruptcy protection within the coming weeks, which it did on October 21, 2026.

== Acquisitions ==
PhotoDisc's online image sales website (2000)

The Hulton Archive website (2001)

Since its formation, Getty Images has pursued an aggressive programme of acquisition, buying up many privately owned agencies that had built up the stock photography industry, from small family-run firms to larger agencies. After getting it start by acquiring Tony Stone Images, in March of 1995, which formed its foundation, by 1999 it had acquired the online art seller Art.com; the sports photography agency Allsport; and the market leader in the Benelux and Scandinavia: World View (1996, from Bert Blokhuis, four offices, for an undisclosed sum); journalistic specialists Liaison Agency; Newsmakers, the first digital news photo agency; Online USA, a specialist in celebrity shots; and the Hulton Press Library, the former archive of the British photojournalistic magazine Picture Post. The Hulton collection was sold by the BBC to Brian Deutsch in 1988, when it was renamed Hulton Deutsch. Getty Images purchased the Hulton collection in 1996 and renamed it Hulton Getty. With the acquisition of the Hulton Library, Getty Images took ownership of the rights to some 15 million photographs from British press archives dating back to the nineteenth century. Hulton Getty also included photographs from the Keystone Collection, as well as images by notable photographers such as Bert Hardy, Bill Brandt, Weegee, and Ernst Haas.

Getty has branched out into stock audio, music and sound effects, and also video with the acquisition of EyeWire and Energy Film Library. Getty has partnered with other companies, including Slidely, for companies and advertisers to use the Getty Images video library of around 2 million videos.

In 2000, Getty acquired one of its main competitors, Archive Photos of New York (a division of The Image Bank), for US$183 million. The Archive Photos library was combined with the Hulton Getty collection to form a new subsidiary, Hulton Archive. Archive Photos was formed in 1990 from the merger of Pictorial Parade (est. 1935) and Frederick Lewis Stock Photos (est. 1938), two well-established US photo agencies. Their collections included archive images from The New York Times, Metronome, and George Eastman House, and works by photographers such as Ruth Orkin, Anacleto Rapping, Deborah Feingold, Murray Garrett, Nat Fein and John Filo.

Further acquisitions followed, with the purchase in 2004 of Image.net for US$20 million. On 9 February 2006, the microstock photo website iStockphoto was acquired by Getty Images for US$50 million. In 2007, Getty successfully purchased its largest competitor, MediaVast, for $207 million. The acquisition gave Getty Images control of WireImage (entertainment, creative, and sports photography), FilmMagic (fashion and red carpet photography), and Contour Photos (portrait and studio photography). Getty Images also acquired other subsidiaries, including Master Delegates, which includes Isifa Image Service in Prague and Laura Ronchi in Italy. In 2008, Getty purchased Redferns Music Picture Library, the music photo library built up by British jazz photographer David Redfern.

On 23 October 2008, Getty Images announced their intention to buy Jupitermedia's online images division, Jupiterimages, for $96 million in cash. The sale went ahead in February 2009; Jupiterimages (including the sites stock.xchng and StockXpert) is now a wholly owned subsidiary of Getty. Jupitermedia, now trading as WebMediaBrands, continues its Internet publishing business, which they didn't sell to Getty Images.

On 25 January 2016, Corbis announced that it had sold its image licensing business, including the Corbis Images, Corbis Motion, and Veer libraries and their associated assets, to Unity Glory, an affiliate of Visual China Group—Getty's exclusive distributor in China. Concurrently, it was announced that VCG would, after a transition period, license, distribute, and market the Corbis library outside of China to Getty. Getty now manages Corbis's physical archives on behalf of VCG and Unity Glory.

In March 2021, Getty Images acquired Unsplash, a free-to-use stock photography website, for an undisclosed sum.

== Corporate ownership and management ==
In February 2008, it was announced that Getty Images would be acquired by the private equity firm Hellman & Friedman in a transaction valued at an estimated US$2.4 billion. On 2 July 2008, Getty Images announced the completion of its acquisition. Getty Images common stock ceased trading on the New York Stock Exchange at the close of the acquisition and was delisted from the NYSE.

In 2012, H&F engaged investment bankers to sell the company. While a price of $4 billion was initially discussed, in August, when the private equity firm Carlyle Group emerged as the likely acquirer, the price under consideration was said to be $3.3–3.4 billion. CVC Capital Partners Ltd. was also said to have been bidding but had yet to top Carlyle's price. The sale to Carlyle thereafter was announced at $3.3 billion, with co-founders Getty and Klein and the Getty family all carrying their investments over into the new ownership structure. Getty continues to serve as chairman and Klein as chief executive.

In September 2018, the Getty family announced it would acquire a majority stake in the company from The Carlyle Group. In July 2022, the company went public again.

== Gallery ==
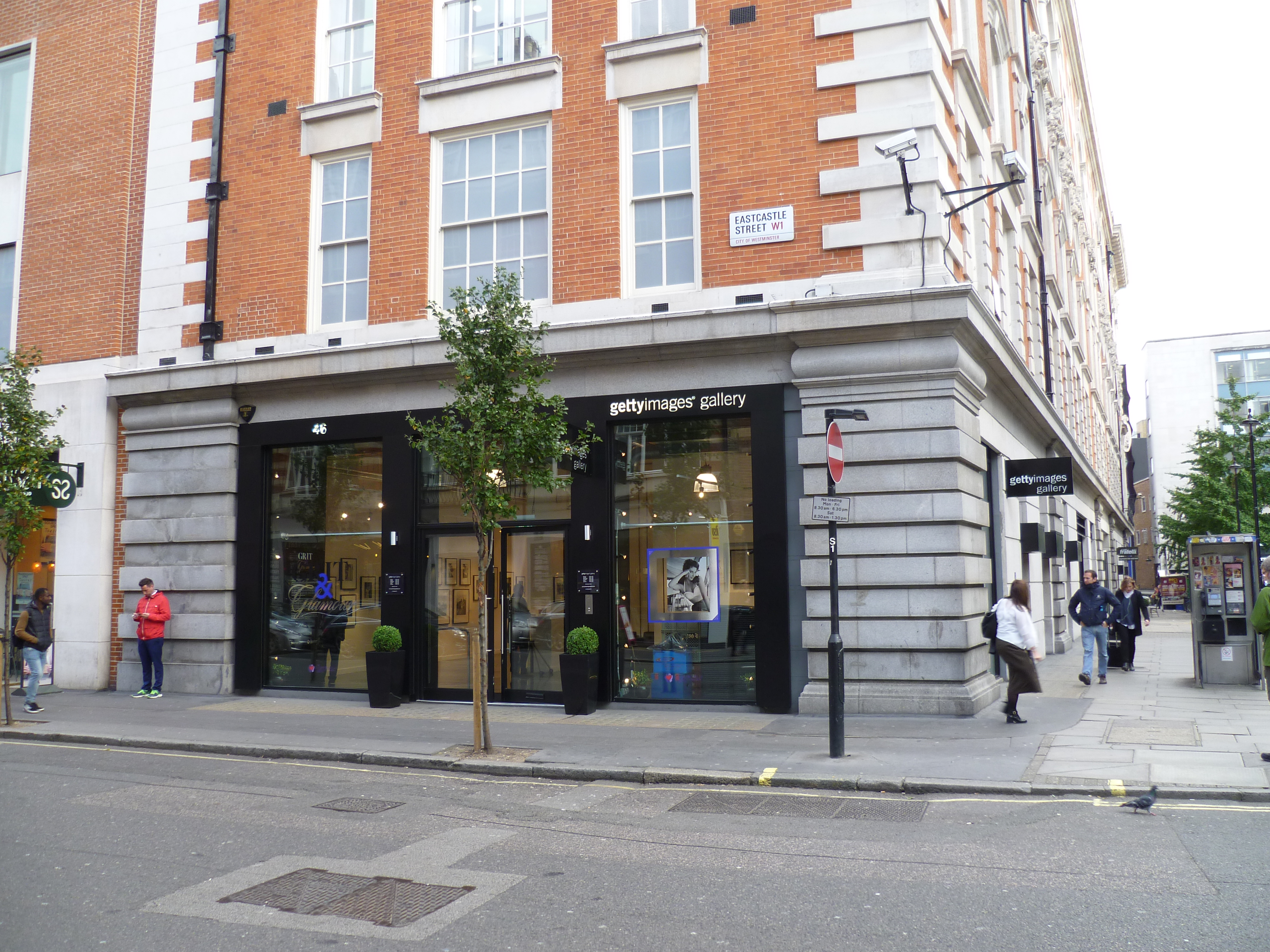
The Getty Images Gallery at Eastcastle Street, London

The Getty Images Gallery was located at 46 Eastcastle Street, London.

In 2008, it hosted an exhibition of children for Barnardo's child adoption agency, in an exhibition called "Home Time", aimed at helping to find homes for hundreds of children waiting for adoption. It included photographs by celebrity photographer Cambridge Jones, as well as by Cherie Blair, Bruce Oldfield, Andrew Lincoln, Gail Porter, and Claudia Winkleman.

The gallery permanently closed in January 2019.

== Copyright enforcement and controversy ==
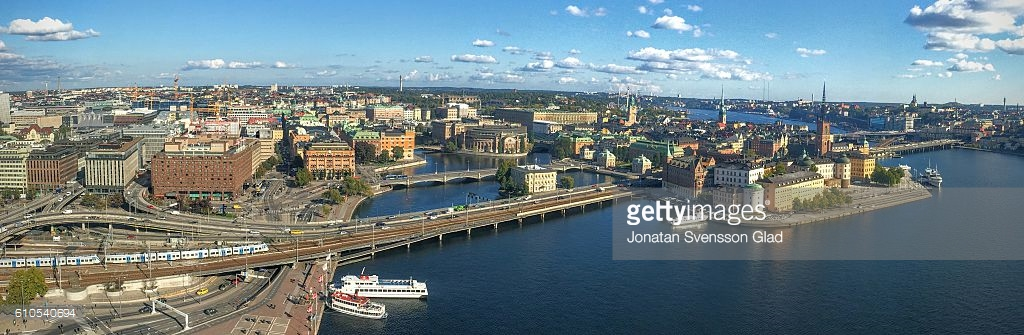
An image formerly available at Getty Images, displaying a watermark with "Getty Images", the author's name, and a file-ID number. This watermark exists on all images on Getty Images when previewing the images, to prevent copyright infringement.

Beginning in 2008, Getty Images has been the subject of controversy for its methods of pursuing copyright enforcement on behalf of its photographers. Rather than pursue a policy of sending "cease and desist" notices, Getty typically mails a demand letter that claims substantial monetary damages from owners of websites it believes infringed on their photographers' copyrights. Getty commonly tries to intimidate website owners by sending collection agents, even though a demand letter does not create a debt.

One photographer noted, "Courts don't like to be used as a means of extortion." In one case, Getty sent a church in Lichfield, Staffordshire, a £6,000 bill for photographs it used on its website, apparently placed there by a church volunteer. In this case, the church offered to pay Getty what it thought was a reasonable amount. The diocese's communications director said:

Getty was not playing ball or following the normal litigation or dispute resolution procedures and [I advised the church] to ignore them. We don't deal with bullies; we deal with legal threats appropriately. I told [Getty] by letter that's what [the church was] doing, that we were not going to play, and didn't hear any more.

The Guardian described other instances in which Getty or other stock photo businesses dropped a claim when a website owner refused to pay and hired a lawyer. A law firm was quoted as saying, "Once we get involved generally Getty does back off."

In 2009, Oscar Michelen, a New York attorney who focuses on such damage claims, said, "The damages they're requesting aren't equal to the copyright infringement," and "there's no law that says definitively what images are worth in the digital age." He called Getty's effort to assess four-figure fines "a legalized form of extortion".

In an effort to combat online copyright infringement, in March 2014 Getty Images made over 35 million images available free for non-commercial online use via embedding with attribution and a link back to the Getty Images website. According to Getty Images executive Craig Peters, "The principle is to turn what's infringing use with good intentions, turning that into something that's valid licensed use with some benefits going back to the photographer".

On 15 February 2018, Google Images' interface was modified to meet the terms of a settlement and licensing partnership with Getty. The "View image" button (a deep link to the image itself on its source server) was removed from image thumbnails. This change is intended to discourage users from directly viewing the full-sized image (though users can still do so using a browser's context menu on the embedded thumbnail) and encourage them to view the image in its appropriate context (which may also include attribution and copyright information) on its respective web page. The "Search by image" button has also been downplayed, as reverse image search can be used to find higher-resolution copies of copyrighted images. Google also agreed to make the copyright disclaimer within the interface more prominent.

=== Copyright infringement lawsuits ===
In 2009, Car-Freshner Corp., makers of Little Trees, filed a lawsuit against Getty Images in U.S. Federal Court, Northern District of New York (Case 7:09-cv-01252-GTS -GHL). Car-Freshner claimed that Getty Images had in its catalog photos that included the famous "tree-shaped" trademarked car fresheners. In 2011, Getty Images attempted to have the case dismissed, but its motion was denied. In 2012, Getty Images agreed to settle by paying $100,000 to Car-Freshener Corp., but admitted no wrongdoing.

In September 2013, Avril Nolan brought a $450,000 suit against Getty Images. Nolan claimed that Getty Images improperly used her image in advertisements portraying her as HIV-positive. She claimed the ad's depiction of her as HIV-positive (she is not) hurt her personal and professional relationships and caused her emotional distress. In March 2014 a judge ruled the lawsuit will be taken to court rather than dismissed. Getty Images settled with Nolan in January 2015.

In November 2013, Getty and Agence France-Presse were ordered to pay $1.2 million in compensation to freelance photojournalist Daniel Morel for using his images posted on Twitter related to the 2010 Haiti earthquake without his permission, in violation of copyright and Twitter's terms of service.

In July 2016, Getty was sued, unsuccessfully, for over $1 billion by Carol Highsmith, an American photographer notable for donating her 100,000+ image collection, royalty-free, to the Library of Congress, when Highsmith found that Getty had been selling unauthorized licenses of her work (an instance of copyfraud). Highsmith found out about this when she received a letter from a law firm representing Getty, demanding $120 for displaying her pictures on a personal website of hers.

In August 2016, Zuma Press, an independent press agency, filed suit against Getty for alleged copyright violations and unauthorized licensing of more than 47,000 images.

=== Claiming copyright over public domain content ===
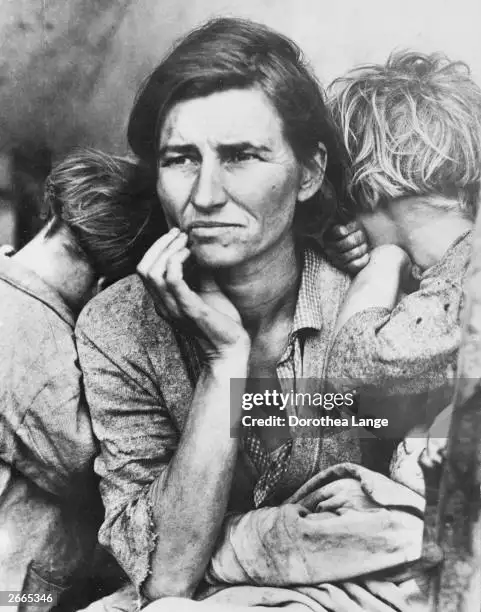
The Migrant Mother image by Dorothea Lange with a Getty Images watermark.

Getty Images has continued the practice that Corbis (whose license it acquired in 2016) has been criticized for of claiming copyright on, watermarking, and selling images that are in the public domain, including images related to the Holocaust like the Warsaw Ghetto boy photo, the Polish cavalry in Sochaczew photograph, or images created by NASA. Getty has also tried to collect fees from photographers for use of their own images that they had previously put in the public domain.

Public-domain photos from historical photographers such as Dorothea Lange and Walker Evans have long been available for unrestricted downloading from the United States Library of Congress. The exact same images are also available from Getty Images, subject to a licensing fee of up to $5,000 for a six-month term. According to Jason Mazzone, a lawyer for the Authors Alliance, these practices demonstrate an example of copyfraud.

=== Controversy over AI-generated art ===
On January 17, 2023, Getty Images said it was suing Stability AI over the use of Getty's images to train the AI art generator Stable Diffusion and for imitating the Getty Images' trademark. Getty released its own AI image generator trained on its library of licensed stock images in September 2023.

== See also ==
- Getty Designs
- Image hosting service
- Image sharing
- List of image-sharing websites
- List of online image archives
- Stock photography
