= Stock footage =

Film or video footage that can be reused

Stock footage, also known as archive footage, library pictures, and file footage, is film or video footage that can be reused in film, television and other audiovisual productions. Stock footage benefits filmmakers by saving them from shooting new material. A single piece of stock footage is called a "stock shot" or a "library shot". Stock footage may have appeared in previous productions but may also be outtakes, footage shot for previous productions and not used, or shot in order to be sold. Examples of stock footage that might be utilized are moving images of cities and landmarks, wildlife in their natural environments, and historical footage. Suppliers of stock footage may be either rights managed or royalty-free. Many websites offer direct downloads of clips in various formats.

== History ==
Film studios have maintained collections of reusable footage since at least the 1920s. The idea gained favor with the rise of B-movies and second features in the 1930s. During the 1980s, professional video formats such as Betacam SP supplemented traditional film-based collections. The industry subsequently underwent consolidation, with larger companies such as Getty Images acquiring specialist footage libraries during the 1990s.

== Films and television ==
The varying reasons for the use of stock footage often fall into the following categories:

=== 1) Historical scenes ===
One of the most common uses of stock footage is in documentaries. Use of stock footage allows the filmmaker to tell the story of historical events, such as Why We Fight, a documentary series about World War II, to document modern underwater archaeology activities, or to supplement content in natural history documentaries. Budgets may not be sufficient to keep a production crew on site for long-term projects, and stock footage lets the producer choose the moments most important to the story or provide context for historical events.

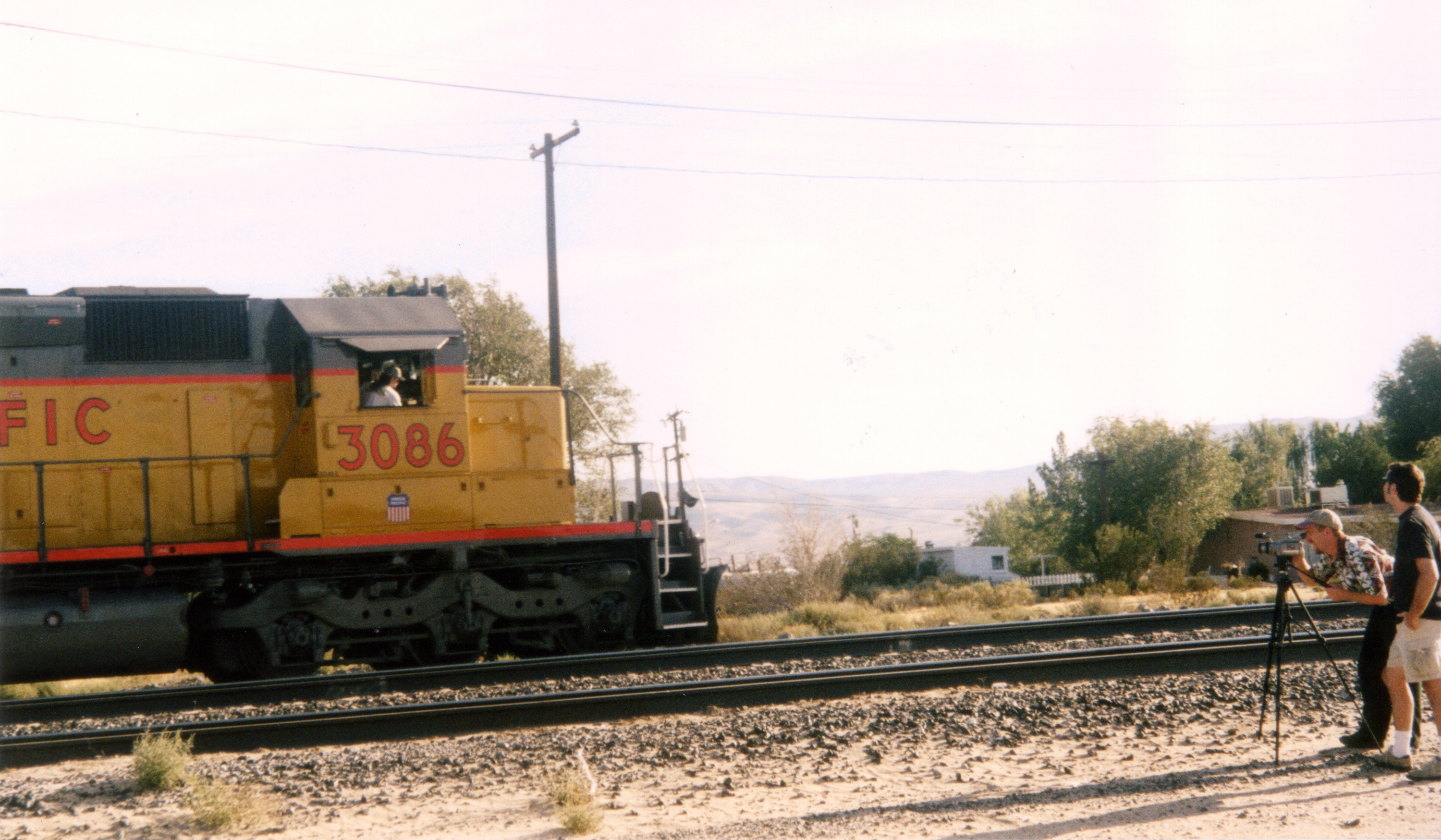
A videographer captures stock footage of a passing train outside Las Vegas

News programs use film footage from their libraries when more recent images are not available. News programs often label such usage on-screen to indicate that the footage is file footage.

Stock footage can be used to incorporate historical events and notable figures into films. For example, the Academy Award-winning film Forrest Gump used stock footage extensively, modified with computer-generated imagery to portray the lead character meeting historical figures such as John F. Kennedy, Richard Nixon, and John Lennon.

Stock footage is also incorporated into some animated television series, where previously filmed live-action sequences may be intercut with animation or used to depict characters' imagined experiences. For example, the original 1984 Muppet Babies incorporated existing footage from films and television programmes, including Star Wars, Raiders of the Lost Ark and Star Trek, into sequences depicting the characters' imaginations.

=== 2) Scene Setting ===
Many broadcast shows use stock-footage clips as establishing shots of a particular city to suggest they are filmed on location when, in fact, they may be filmed on a studio backlot. One or two establishing shots of an exotic location such as the Great Wall of China, Easter Island, or French Polynesia will save production companies the major costs of transporting crew and equipment to those actual locations.

=== 3) Previous installments ===
Television and film series often recycle footage from previous installments. For example, the Star Trek franchise reused special-effects footage depicting starships, planets, backgrounds and explosions across multiple television series and films. Reusing these sequences reduced the need to produce new shots involving expensive models, miniature sets and visual effects.

Some children's television series, such as Teletubbies, reuse footage across multiple episodes, providing familiar structural elements for young viewers and increasing their familiarity with the program. The program also deliberately repeated short documentary sequences within individual episodes to help children notice additional details and absorb the material.

=== 4) Playback ===
Stock footage displayed on television screens or monitors within films and television programs is sometimes referred to as "playback". The San Diego stock-footage company New & Unique Videos supplied archival footage for productions including Disney's Smart House, incorporating hurricane footage from the company's collection.

=== 5) Budgetary and Logistical Constraints ===
Stock footage is often used in commercials to reduce production costs or accommodate time constraints. Sometimes it can be used to composite moving images that create the illusion of having on-camera performers appear to be on location. The term B-roll may refer to stock footage or newly shot scenes.

During the COVID-19 pandemic, some television productions reused previously recorded footage of studio audiences to compensate for restrictions on live audiences. In 2020, the American edition of The Masked Singer incorporated audience-reaction footage from earlier seasons, alongside computer-generated imagery, to simulate a live audience. Similarly, the 72nd Primetime Emmy Awards used previously recorded audience footage and applause during its opening sequence.

=== Criticism ===
The extensive reuse of footage from earlier productions has attracted criticism in some films. Japanese kaiju films, especially entries in Toho's Godzilla franchise, have been criticized for their extensive use of stock footage, particularly to extend battle sequences, sometimes as flashbacks and other times incorporated into the films' ongoing action. In the case of Noriaki Yuasa’s Gamera vs. Viras (1968), the inserted footage amounted to approximately 15 minutes of largely unedited stock footage.

A noted criticism of Silent Night, Deadly Night 2 was that 40 minutes of its 85-minute runtime was archive footage taken from the original film, especially when used as flashbacks to explain a character's trauma, even though the character was not present during those events. In the 1987 film Jaws: The Revenge, which incorporated archive footage from the original 1975 film Jaws featuring Roy Scheider as Martin Brody, the reused material appears in flashbacks during Sean Brody's funeral and the film's climax, prompting criticism of the narrative logic of Ellen Brody recalling events she had not witnessed.

=== Examples ===
Notable examples of films incorporating stock footage, including material reused from earlier productions and archival footage assembled into new works, include:

Examples of films using stock footage
Title	Year	Description	Ref
All Monsters Attack	1969	Reuses monster battles from earlier Godzilla films, particularly Ebirah, Horror of the Deep and Son of Godzilla.	
Anchorman: The Legend of Ron Burgundy	2004	Archival footage was incorporated as television-screen "playback" material within the film.	
Bill & Ted's Excellent Adventure	1989	Archive footage incorporated into its historical or time-travel sequences, including footage from War and Peace depicting Napoleon's military campaign in Austria.	
Blade Runner	1982	Archive footage of mountainous, forested landscapes from The Shining.	
They Shall Not Grow Old	2018	Peter Jackson digitally restored, colourised and modified First World War archival footage to create a feature-length documentary.	
The Coolbaroo Club	1996	Combines historical footage, interviews and dramatisations to document the history of the Coolbaroo League, a Noongar-run dance club in Perth.	
For Love or Money	1983	An archival compilation documentary drawing on more than 200 Australian films made between 1906 and 1983, including newsreels, home movies and documentaries.	
Forrest Gump	1994	Stock footage extensively modified with computer-generated imagery to portray the lead character meeting historical figures such as John F. Kennedy, Richard Nixon, and John Lennon.	
Godzilla vs. Gigan	1972	Reuses monster-combat footage and special-effects sequences from earlier productions, including Destroy All Monsters and Ghidorah, the Three-Headed Monster.	
Godzilla vs. Megalon	1973	Reuses special-effects footage from earlier Godzilla productions, including military attacks, explosions, destruction, and monster-action sequences, as part of the film's ongoing action, rather than flashbacks or memories.	
Halloween II	1981	Reused footage from the climax of Halloween (1978) to establish continuity between the two films.	
Harry Potter and the Order of the Phoenix	2007	Montages of reused footage recalling earlier events in the film series.	
Harry Potter and the Deathly Hallows - Part 1 and Part 2	2010–2011	Reused footage recalling earlier installments in the Harry Potter series, including Harry Potter's memories of his connection to Voldemort in part 1 and Severus Snape's memories in part 2.	
Hitman	2007	Footage from another production (Dark Angel), rather than from an earlier installment in its own franchise.	
Jaws: The Revenge	1987	Reused footage from the original film in the series, Jaws, principally featuring Roy Scheider as Police Chief Martin Brody.	
Silent Night, Deadly Night 2	1987	Reused footage from the initial 1984 film, Silent Night, Deadly Night, as flashback memories of the protagonist.	
Smart House	1999	"Playback" footage was supplied for screens in the film, incorporating archive shots of news items such as hurricane footage.	
Star Wars: Episode II – Attack of the Clones	2002	Reused footage from the prior 1999 film in this series, Star Wars: Episode I – The Phantom Menace, including scenes depicting the Jedi Council chamber.	
Transformers: Dark of the Moon	2011	Reused and digitally modified footage from the highway chase sequence in director Michael Bay's earlier 2005 film, The Island.	
Winhanganha	2023	A film constructed around archival footage, sound, poetry and original composition, exploring the relationship between Australia's First Nations people and audiovisual collections.	

Notable examples of television programs that have reused film footage from previous productions include:

Examples of television programs using stock footage
Title	Year	Description	Ref
I'm a Celebrity	2002-present	Usage of footage from its own earlier broadcasts or previously recorded television appearances for recap purposes.	
Muppet Babies	1984–1991	External archive footage was incorporated into sequences depicting the characters' imaginations from sources such as Star Wars, Raiders of the Lost Ark and Star Trek.	
Star Trek	1966–present	In the original series, footage from the show pilot, The Cage, was extensively reused in a later episode, The Menagerie, so producers could recoup their substantial investment in the rejected pilot and reduce the production time needed to meet the series' broadcast schedule. Later, the sequel series, Next Generation, used digital compositing to reuse the same shot of the Enterprise against different planetary backgrounds.	
Teletubbies	1997 – 2001	Sequences are repeated between programs, especially the more expensive computer-generated animations.	

== Other uses ==
=== Corporate usage ===
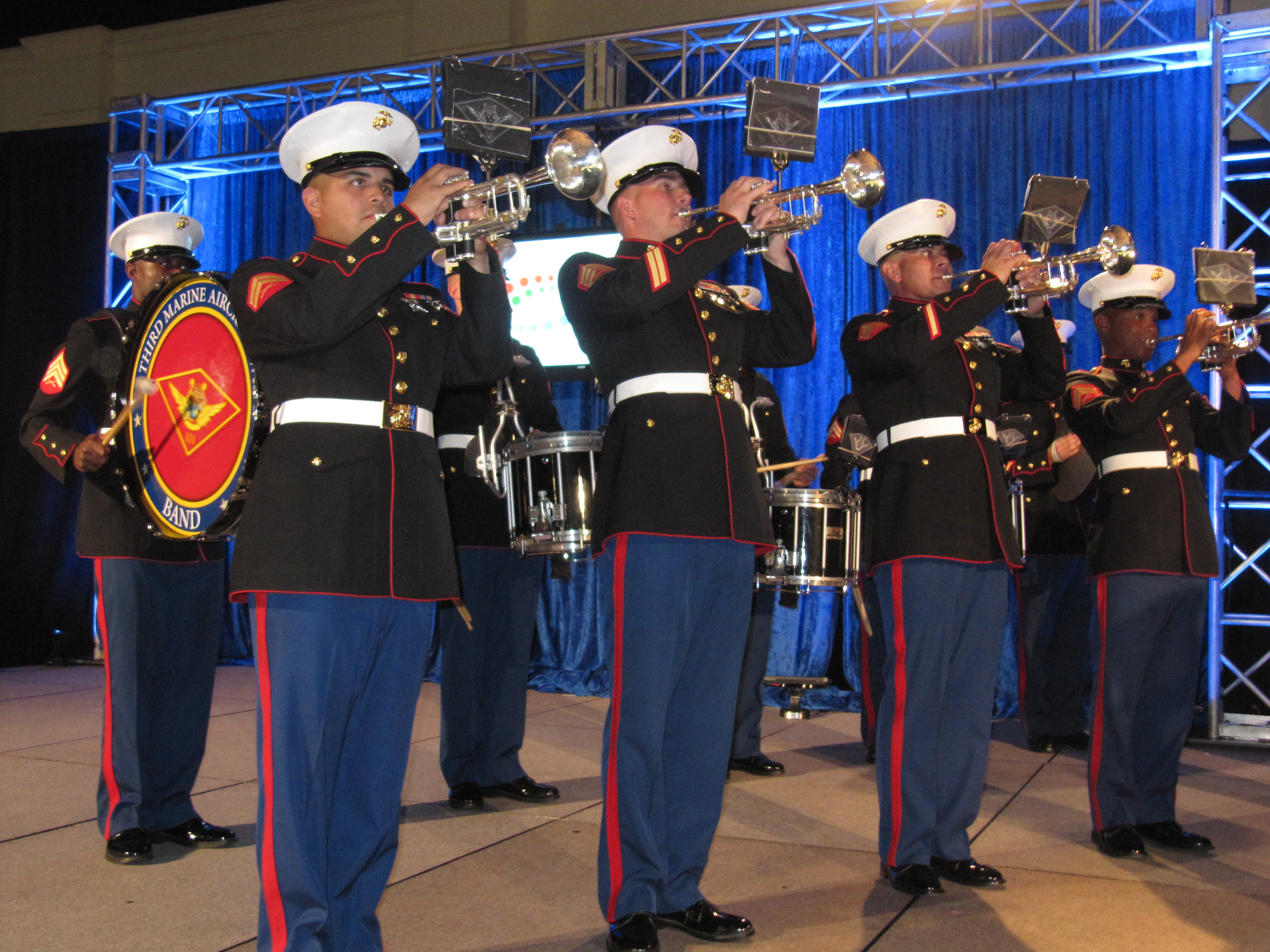
The 3rd Marine Aircraft Wing Band, USMC, performs in San Diego, 2011: still shot from stock footage clip.

Companies worldwide use stock footage in video productions for in-house meetings, annual conventions, seminars, and other events. It has become popular to record interviews with executives and other participants using a green screen backdrop. During post-production, the green is keyed out and stock footage or stock shots are inserted to convey a particular message.

=== Public domain ===
The United States federal government is a significant source of public domain stock footage. Under United States copyright law, audiovisual works created by federal government employees as part of their official duties are generally not subject to copyright protection in the United States, making such footage available for reuse. Government agencies, including the United States military and the National Aeronautics and Space Administration (NASA), produce and distribute extensive collections of audiovisual material. However, not all footage distributed or held by these agencies is unrestricted, as some material may contain third-party copyrighted content or be subject to other legal limitations. In addition to public-domain material, stock footage is obtained from earlier films and television programmes, news organisations, archival collections, and footage produced specifically for licensing. Commercial stock-footage libraries may charge licensing fees and impose conditions on reuse, with arrangements varying according to whether the footage is offered on a rights-managed or royalty-free basis.

== Preservation ==
Several films that would otherwise be completely lost have surviving footage because they were used as stock footage. For example, The Cat Creeps has some scenes preserved in the movie Boo, and scenes from Queen of the Night Clubs are preserved as stock footage in Winner Take All. Without its use as stock footage, these films would be lost entirely.

== Format ==
=== Evolution ===
Comparison of common broadcast resolutions

Advances in display resolution standards have influenced the production, preservation and reuse of stock footage. Footage originally captured on photographic film can often be rescanned at higher resolutions, whereas footage recorded on videotape or in digital formats may be limited by the resolution of the original recording. During the transition from standard-definition (SD) to high-definition (HD) television, stock-footage libraries questioned the continuing commercial value of their existing collections, although older footage remained useful for productions requiring historical or otherwise unavailable material. Stock-footage providers have also expanded their offerings beyond conventional video formats to include virtual reality (VR) and 360-degree video footage.

== Libraries ==
Notable and currently active stock footage libraries and archives include:

Active stock-footage libraries and archives
Library or archive	Country	Established	Ref
123RF	Malaysia / United States	2005	
Adobe Stock	United States	2015	
Al Jazeera Creative Commons	Qatar	2009	
Alamy	United Kingdom	1999	
Associated Press	United States	1846	
BBC Motion Gallery	United Kingdom	2004	
BBC Backstage	United Kingdom	2005	
BFI National Archive	United Kingdom	1935	
British Pathé	United Kingdom	1910	
CNN Collection (formerly CNN ImageSource)	United States	1980	
Branded Entertainment	United States	—	
Dailymotion	France	2005	
Depositphotos	United States	2009	
Film Archives, Inc.	United States	1986	
Flickr	United States	2004	
FootageBank	United States	2002	
Footagevault	United Kingdom	—	
Fotosearch	United States	—	
Framepool	Germany	2001	
Getty Images	United States	1995	
Internet Archive	United States	1996	
iStock	Canada	2000	
ITN Source	United Kingdom	—	
NASA Images	United States	—	
National Film Board of Canada	Canada	1939	
National Film and Sound Archive	Australia	1984 (organisation); 1935 (collection)	
Nautilus Productions	United States	—	
NBC News Archives	United States	—	
NHNZ	New Zealand	1977	
Nimia	United States	—	
Oddball Films	United States	—	
Pexels	Germany	2014	
Pixabay	Germany	2010	
Pond5	United States	2006	
Producers Library Service	United States	—	
Reuters	United Kingdom	1851	
Science Photo Library	United Kingdom	—	
Shutterstock	United States	2003	
Stocksy United	Canada	2012 (incorporated); 2013 (launched)	
StormStock	United States	—	
Vimeo	United States	2004	
Visual China Group	China	2000	

Notable defunct stock footage libraries and archives include:

Defunct stock-footage libraries and archives
Library or archive	Country	Established	Closed	Ref
Can Stock Photo	Canada	2004	2023	

== See also ==
- Archival research
- Clip show
- Free content
- Production music
- Stock photography
- Stock sound effect
