= List of online image archives =

This is an incomplete list of notable online image archives, including both image hosting websites, and archives hosted by libraries and other academic or historical institutions.

== List of archives ==
Site	Type	Number of Images	Video	Sound	Search	Languages
Adobe Stock	Stock Images	366,000,000+ (January 2025)	Yes	No	Yes	English, French
Alamy	Stock Images	428,251,303 (October 2025)	Yes	No	Yes	English (Default)+ German
ArenaPAL Performing Arts Image Library	Performing Arts	5,000,000+	No	No	Yes	English
artresearch.net	Art	2,200,000+	No	No	Yes	English, German, Italian, Dutch
Artstor Digital Library						
Associated Press: AP Images	Rights Managed	12,000,000+	Yes	No	Yes	English
Bridgeman Art Library	Art, History, Culture	5,500,000	Yes	Yes	Yes	English, French, Italian, German
California Digital Library						
California State University, Northridge, Oviatt Library Digital Collections						
Camera Press						
Chicago Daily News (1902–1933), collection of over 55,000 images on glass plate negatives						
Depositphotos	Stock Images	164,000,000+ (June 2020)	Yes	No	Yes	English (Default)+ 21 other languages
ETH Library, Image Archive	Commons	1,000,000+	No	No	Yes	German, English
Europeana						
Flickr	Commons		Yes	No	No	English (Default) + 9 other languages
Frick Digital Image Archive						
Geograph Britain and Ireland	Commons	7,900,000+ (March 2025)	No	No	Yes	English
Getty Images: IStock; Thinkstock						
Harvard Library						
Internet Archive		5.13 million (March 2025)	Yes	Yes	Yes	
Library of Congress	Public domain					
Life (magazine)						
Nationaal Archief (1945–1989) collection of over 400,000 (Dutch) press-images	Commons	approximately 400,000	No	No	Yes	Dutch (Default)+ English
National Geographic Image Collection (1888–present), collection of more than 10 million digital images, transparencies, b&w prints, early auto chromes, and pieces of original artwork						
New York Daily News (1880–2007), online photo archive DailyNewsPix, with photographs dating back to 1880						
New York Public Library	≈ 30% Public domain	922,400+ (May 2024)	No	No	Yes	English
Pexels	Pexels license		Yes	No	Yes	
Pixabay	Pixabay license	950,000+ (May 2017)	Yes	No	Yes	English (Default) + 25 other languages
Pond5	Royalty-free	11,000,000+ (Jan 2017)	Yes	Yes	Yes	English (Default) + 7 other languages
Smithsonian Institution / Smithsonian Open Access		4,400,000+ (Jan 2023)				
Shutterstock	Royalty-free	450,000,000+ (March 2025)	Yes	Yes	Yes	English (Default) + 19 other languages
The New York Times	Rights Managed	5,000,000+	Yes	No	Yes	English
Time	Rights Managed	1,000,000+	Yes	No	Yes	English
United Press International (1907–2007)						
United States National Library of Medicine, images from the history of medicine						
University of Southern California Libraries						
Unsplash	Commons with additional restrictions	1,000,000+ (2020)	No	No	Yes	English
Wikimedia Commons	Commons	116,000,000+ (March 2025)	Yes	Yes	Yes	English (Default) + other languages

== See also ==
- Commons:Free media resources
- Wikipedia:List of online newspaper archives
- List of online magazines
- Wikipedia:List of online video archives
- Newsreel
