= Framepool =

- Industry: media
- Genre: Stock footage
- Predecessor: Framepool Aktiengesellschaft
- Founded: 2001
- Founder: Ulrike Ziegler, Stephan Bleek, Jürgen Wente
- Fate: acquired by Nimia in June 2020
- Headquarters: Seattle, United States
- Number of locations: 6 sales divisions: Seattle; London; New York City; Tokyo; Sydney; Los Angeles
- Area served: Worldwide
- Key people: Zachary McIntosh (CEO)
- Products: video; still images from video; audio
- Services: Rights-managed and royalty-free video; Research; Rights clearance; Digital asset management
- Number of employees: 45
- Parent: Nimia
- Website: www.framepool.com

Framepool is a stock footage agency owned by Nimia as of June 2020, based in Seattle, Washington with representation in the United Kingdom, Spain, Japan, and Australia. It is a supplier of stock video footage for business and consumers with more than 3000 hours of stock film footage available online and even more available offline.

Beside stock footage libraries that only offer royalty-free stock footage Framepool offers direct only licensing and download of rights-managed stock footage, which only few other comparable stock footage libraries offer. Downloading of the stock footage can be customized which also is only offered by few other stock footage libraries.

Additionally to the online research Framepool also offers offline research and scanning of old footage as well as full services for rights-clearance and indemnification. Framepool has over 700 contributors including ORF, AFP, WGBH, WLIW21, NHNZ, Radio Canada/CBC and the National Film Board of Canada.

Framepool also is engaged in scanning and digitalizing footage from the NARA Archive, mainly old Newsreel. Framepool is a technology leader within the stock footage market and the first library implementing a visual search capability for stock footage.

Framepool delivered footage for many notable films and TV commercials for example for Audi. Films Framepool contributed to include for example Iron Man 3 and The Men Who Stare at Goats. It is listed among the "best-known" and "prestigious footage companies" together with Getty Images, FootageBank, CNN ImageSource and Shutterstock and was called one of the leading footage libraries worldwide.
