= Stock photography platform cooperative =

Stock photography cooperative

A stock photography platform cooperative is an alternative for photographers to utilize the internet to sell their photographs and videos, while the cooperative gives them a say in the process. A stock photography platform cooperative, collectively owned and governed by its members (artists, content creators, staff, stakeholders, etc.), offers an advantage over traditional digital platforms because creators are in control and have an active stake in decisions through the cooperative governance structure. Together, this provides members/creators with a mechanism to ensure that all parties have a stake in how their products or services are produced and delivered. The cooperative differentiates itself from other stock photography firms by its stated focus on fair pay and creating sustainable careers for its members.

== Stock photography agencies ==
Stock photography is a library of images available on the global marketplace. The first stock agency was created in 1920 by H. Armstrong Roberts and still operates under RobertStock. Stock agencies, large or small, online or brick and mortar, provide licenses and distribute images and pay creators and generally operate under one of three models:

1. Macrostock Agencies, the traditional way to sell photographs, originating in the early 1900s, sells images exclusively and in limited quantities.
2. Midstock Agencies offer both exclusive and non-exclusive photo sales, pay higher commissions than microstock agencies, and have less expensive images.
3. Microstock Agencies sell a wide range of images online at lower prices, with unlimited quantities, typically royalty-free, with fewer restrictions on users.

Each agency model has its own quality requirements, subject matter, and income distribution. Additionally, the licenses would outline the terms of usage for the purchasers. Examples of stock photography agencies include:

- 123RF
- Adobe Stock
- Alamy
- Depositphotos
- Dreamstime
- Unsplash

== Digitization of stock photography agencies ==
Stock photography digital platforms have emerged as online marketplaces to buy and sell photographies. A digital platform relies on networked technologies to enable access to shared resources and provides people access to things like social media, online banking, search engines, marketplaces, and so much more. These online applications can reduce barriers and offer people flexibility and independence by enabling them to sell their products or services online. Pioneer digital platforms include:

- Tony Stone and Getty Images
- Hulton Picture Collection and Picture Plus
- Bruce Livingstone and iStock
- Jon Oringer and Shutterstock

== Stock photography agencies as platform cooperatives ==
Some online stock photography agencies are established as platform cooperatives.

Cooperatives are for-profit and not-for-profit organizations whose enterprise model is centred on open membership, profit distribution, and democratic control. They have a corporate identity that aligns with internationally accepted. It is the involvement of members and stakeholders that provides the cooperative with a governance framework that establishes the coop's best practices. This hands-on participation in decision-making, particularly in worker and producer cooperatives, helps ensure the co-op stays aligned with the members' needs.

== The case of Stocksy United ==
Stocksy United
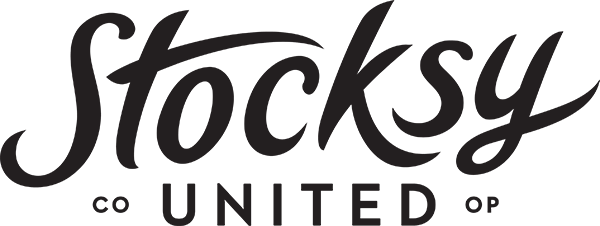
- Type: Platform cooperative
- Genre: Stock photography
- Founded: March 2013
- Founders: Brianna Wettlaufer; Bruce Livingstone; Dan Ross; Tyler Stalman; Nuno Silva; Brent Nelson
- Headquarters: Victoria, British Columbia, Canada
- Key people: Brianna Wettlaufer (Co-founder & CEO)
- Website: www.stocksy.com

Stocksy United is an example of a stock photography platform cooperative. It is incorporated as a multistakeholder cooperative that uses a digital platform to provide members with work, access to marketing, and the ability to distribute their photographs. Stocksy United, also referred to as Stocksy or Stocksy United Photography, is based in Victoria, British Columbia and accepts and provides royalty-free stock photography and stock video. Stocksy uses a curated editing approach to select useful and authentic photos.

Stocksy United was founded on April 20, 2012 and publicly launched on March 25, 2013 by iStockphoto founder Bruce Livingstone and co-founder Brianna Wettlaufer. At the time of launch, Stocksy had about 220 contributing photographers, and by 2023, it had 1800+, living in 80+ countries.

Stocksy is a platform cooperative with three classes of shareholders.

1. Class A: Advisors, including CEO Brianna Wettlaufer.
2. Class B: Staff, and
3. Class C: Artists who contribute content.

Each member co-owns the cooperative and has one vote, and each class has at least two directors on the board. Co-op membership is achieved through a single-step process in which interested artists submit a portfolio via Stocksy's Call to Artists webpage. Accepted members license creative content and receive 50% royalties on standard license sales, 75% on extended license sales, and year-end profit sharing in the form of patronage returns.

== See also ==
- Co-operative Model
- Culture Industry
- Digital Economy
- Digital Photography
- Platform Cooperatives
- Royalty-free
- Sharing Economy
- Worker Co-operative
