= Pond5 =

American stock photo agency

- Type: Subsidiary
- Industry: stock footage, stock music, sound effects, and stock photography
- Founded: 2006
- Founder: Tom Bennett (founder); Marcus Engene (founder)
- Headquarters: New York City, New York, U.S.
- Number of locations: New York, London, Dublin, Prague
- Area served: Global
- Products: Stock Footage; Stock Music; Sound Effects; Stock Images; Pond5 Select; Pond5 Subscriptions
- Services: Licensing of stock media
- Number of employees: 175
- Parent: Shutterstock
- Website: www.pond5.com

Pond5 is a New York–based online marketplace for royalty-free media. The company licenses stock footage, stock music, stock photography, sound effects, Adobe After Effects templates, and 3D models. Pond5 claims to have the world's largest collection of stock footage, and that they host more than 44 million clips as of January 2025.

The company originally focused on selling video clips, but began to expand into other asset types following its 2013 acquisition of Pixmac, a stock photography site based in the Czech Republic. The acquisition added Pixmac’s 6,000+ photographers and support for 17 languages to the Pond5 marketplace.

== History ==
Pond5 was founded in 2006 as a way for video producers to license content to third parties. It subsequently expanded into other media types, including photos, music, sound effects, 3D models, and Adobe After Effects templates. Pond5 does not own the content on its site, but instead aggregates and sells content created and owned by its contributors. These contributors determine the selling price, and earn 50% of revenue.

In July 2014, venture capital firms Accel Partners and Stripes Group invested $61 million in series A financing into Pond5. In May 2022 Pond5 was acquired by Shutterstock for $210 million USD.

== Products and partnerships ==
In January 2014, Pond5 partnered with Adobe to create a plugin for Adobe Premiere Pro integrating the Pond5 video collection with the editing suite.

In early 2015, the company launched the Public Domain Project, a free online repository of nearly 100,000 digitalized media assets.

The original business model focused on licensing individual video clip sales. However, in February 2016, the company unveiled a subscription product.

In late December 2016, the company rolled out extended licenses aimed at attracting large enterprise customers.

In December 2018, the company announced a partnership with the Tribeca Film Institute, launching a program to provide grants of up to $7500 as well as mentorship, content and education to independent filmmakers.

In June 2019, the company launched partnerships with Reuters, Cover Video, and Newsflare to create the world's largest collection of royalty-free editorial video.

== See also ==
- List of stock footage libraries
- Stock photography/Microstock photography
- List of online image archives
