= National Geographic Image Collection =

Stock photography agency

- Company type: Division of the National Geographic Society
- Industry: Stock Images, Image Licensing, Rights Services, Artist Representation and Media Management
- Founded: Washington DC, United States (1888)
- Headquarters: Washington DC, USA
- Key people: Maura Mulvihill (Vice President)

National Geographic Image Collection, a division of the National Geographic Partners, a joint venture between the National Geographic Society and The Walt Disney Company, headquartered in Washington, D.C., United States, was a stock photography agency that managed and licensed one of the world's most comprehensive and unique collections of photographs and original artwork. It maintained a collection of more than 10 million digital images, transparencies, black-and-white prints, early auto chromes, and pieces of original artwork.

In 2002, a portion of the collection was made available online for rights-managed licensing. In 2007, the online presence was reintroduced offering both rights-managed and royalty-free licensing. The site offered over 237,371 still images for licensing (41,559 RF, 195,812 RM).

On 22 December 2020, National Geographic Partners closed National Geographic Image Collection and the websites www.natgeocreative.com, www.nationalgeographicstock.com and natgeoimagecollection.com were terminated.

== Collection overview ==
The National Geographic Image Collection is the photographic and illustrations archive of the National Geographic Society. The Image Collection operates as a full-service stock photography agency as well as providing editing, research, and rights clearance services. Sophisticated systems are utilized to track, file, dupe, label, catalog, and research the images used in NGS products.

The permanent collection consists of over 10 million photographs and works of art. This includes 300,000 published images, 1 million file selects, and 300,000 staff rolls (9 million images). At any given time there are also 50–60,000 non-staff rolls (2 million images) in transit among Film Review, the Image Collection, and return to photographers.

Images become part of the collection if they are

- Published in a Society product
- Chosen as a file select or out-take from a National Geographic assignment
- Submitted to Image Sales as stock photography (stock-only images).

Selected images are available online through their e-commerce site: www.nationalgeographicstock.com

=== Archives on public display ===
On September 17, 2009 the National Geographic Image Collection opened its first exhibition of vintage National Geographic images at the Steven Kasher Gallery in Chelsea, New York. 150 vintage prints, many of which were never published in National Geographic Magazine, from a dozen photographers, were on display. The images, which make up a collective portrait of the Society's early years, are stored in a 2,000-square-foot (190 m^{2}) windowless, climate-controlled, underground archive with roots reaching back more than a century.

The National Geographic Image Collection archive also includes glass-plate negatives and auto chromes, the earliest examples of color photography. In a walk-in refrigerated vault near the main archive room, the Image Collection stores hundreds of thousands of 35mm color transparencies and negatives, and it is now storing hundreds of thousands more digital images on hard drives.

=== National Geographic: The Image Collection Book ===
On October 2, 2009 the National Geographic Image Collection released the largest single volume of world-renowned National Geographic photographs published by the organization. The 500-page National Geographic Image Collection showcases 120 years of world history, natural history and culture chronicled and preserved in the Society's unique archive of more than 11.5 million images. The work of 204 photographers includes approximately 400 color and black-and-white images that are presented and divided into four themes: Exploration, Wildlife, People & Culture, and Science & Climate Change. A behind-the-scenes profile of the entire Image Collection, including auto chromes, glass color transparencies, black-and-white prints, color transparencies and digital media is also covered in the book.

== Agency overview ==
The National Geographic Image Collection represents hundreds of National Geographic photographers, writers, and artists. It acts as the photographers representative to market, license, and promote commercial and editorial assignment work. The National Geographic Image Collection generates ancillary income for the photographers, illustrators, and/or writers and collects a commission on all sales.

The National Geographic Image Collection represents photographers, artists, and writers who have signed a contract allowing the National Geographic Image Collection to act as their agent, or whose material was created while they were on staff at NGS. The National Geographic Society does not solicit images from photographers. Most photographic work is assigned by editors to staff and freelance photographers with years of experience in photojournalism.

Clients include in-house NGS users and outside clients requiring images for a variety of editorial and commercial uses. Sales executives and researchers provide research, dupes or digital files, clear rights, and pay photographers.
