= FreeImages =

Website providing stock images

stock.xchng and Stockxpert
- Industry: Publishing, media, web design
- Genre: Stock photography
- Founder: Péter Görgényi, Péter Hamza and András Pfaff (no longer with the sites)
- Headquarters: Budapest, Hungary
- Products: Digital images
- Services: Royalty-free images
- Parent: HAAP Media/Jupiterimages, a subsidiary of Getty Images
- Website: www.sxc.hu

stock.xchng (also known as SXC) was a website providing free-to use stock photography and illustrations, its name being a reduced version of "stock exchange" (meaning the exchange of stock photography, and a play on the corresponding financial term. The site was launched in February 2001 by Peter Hamza, and allows users to contribute, share and download high-resolution photographs and illustrations free of charge. Contributors are encouraged to submit material to enhance their photography career through wider public exposure. In 2009, the site had over 2,500,000 registered users (1,000,000 in the USA alone) and more than 400,000 photos. Until 2009, it operated parallel to its sister site, Stockxpert.com, until the site's parent company, Jupiterimages, was purchased by Getty Images, and the site is now tied in with the iStock library of paid images.

Since its acquisition by Getty Images in 2014, the site was renamed FreeImages in 2014 and the web address now redirects to a freeimages.com URL. It has retained the older SXC images and the link to the iStock website.

== Features ==
The stock.xchng website in 2009, with iStockphoto results

The stock.xchng site operated as a hybrid of a picture library site and a social networking site; registered users could set up a personal profile, upload their photographic works to share with other users, write a blog and participate in online forums to discuss and critique each other's work.

As a design resource, the site provided a library of high-resolution, royalty-free photographs which may be downloaded free of charge for use in design projects. Although images are free, contributors still retain moral rights and photographs are still subject to usage restrictions.

== Stockxpert ==
The StockXpert website in 2009

Until 2009, stock.xchng operated alongside its sister site, Stockxpert. Stockxpert was designed with a near-identical user interface, but functioned as a commercial microstock photography site, allowing users, through a system of online credits, to purchase and download images for a very low cost, often as low as US$1.

On the free stock.xchng website, results from the search engine would also bring up a sample of five images from Stockxpert to encourage users to purchase images from Stockxpert. Following the acquisition of Jupiterimages by Getty in 2009, stock.xchng presented search results from Getty's own microstock site, iStockphoto.

Stockxpert continued to operate as a separate website until its closure on February 11, 2010.

== Parent companies ==
The site was a subsidiary of HAAP Media, which was the stock photography division of Dream Interactive. In 2008, HAAP was acquired by the stock photo company Jupiterimages. In February 2009, Jupiterimages was purchased by Getty Images, and the stock photo operations of SXC became a joint venture between Getty and Dream Interactive. In December 2009, fhe founders decided to sell their remaining interest in the sites, and later started a similar service, Stockfresh.
