= Mahlagha Jaberi =

Iranian model (born 1989)

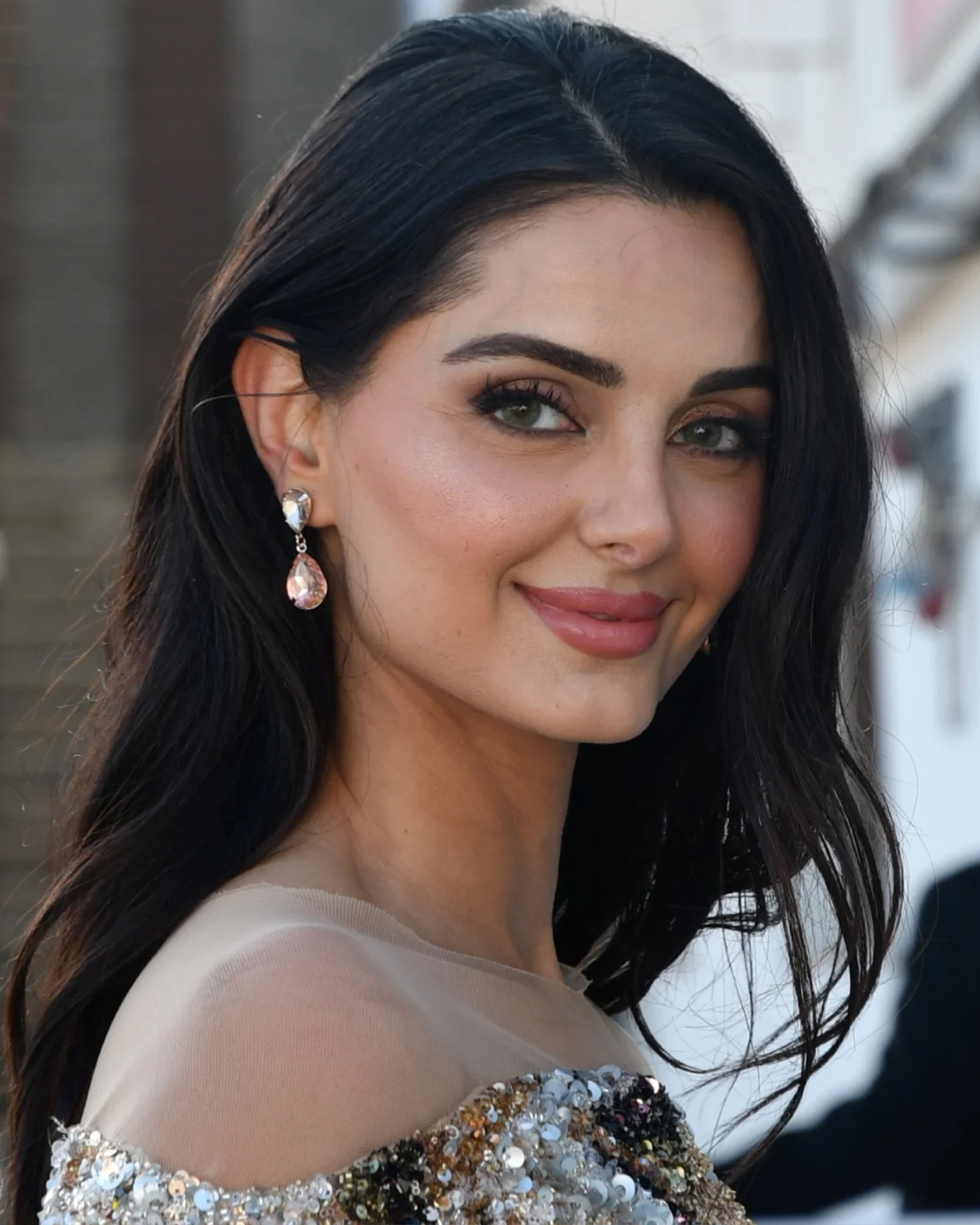
- Jaberi in 2025
- Born: June 17, 1989 (age 37); Isfahan, Iran
- Occupation: Instagram Influencer
- Years active: 2012–present
- Partner: Armin Asadyari (m. 2026)
- Modeling information
- Height: 5 ft 6 in (1.68 m)
- Hair color: Dark Brown
- Eye color: Dark Brown

Mahlagha Jaberi Dashtestani (Persian: مه‌لقا جابری, born 17 June 1989) is an Iranian Instagram influencer. She rose to prominence in the early 2010s among Iranian and Arab users by sharing digitally altered images of herself on social media.

== Early life and career ==
Mahlagha Jaberi was born on June 17, 1989 in Isfahan. She has three older sisters named Khatereh, Raheleh, and Arezou, and is the youngest child in the family. Jaberi spent her youth in Iran until the age of nineteen. In the late 2000s, she and her sister Arezou worked as models for local beauty salons and bridal boutiques. After their older sister Raheleh began working as a photographer for the stock photography website Dreamstime in 2007, Mahlagha and Arezou became the primary subjects of her artistic photography and modeling.

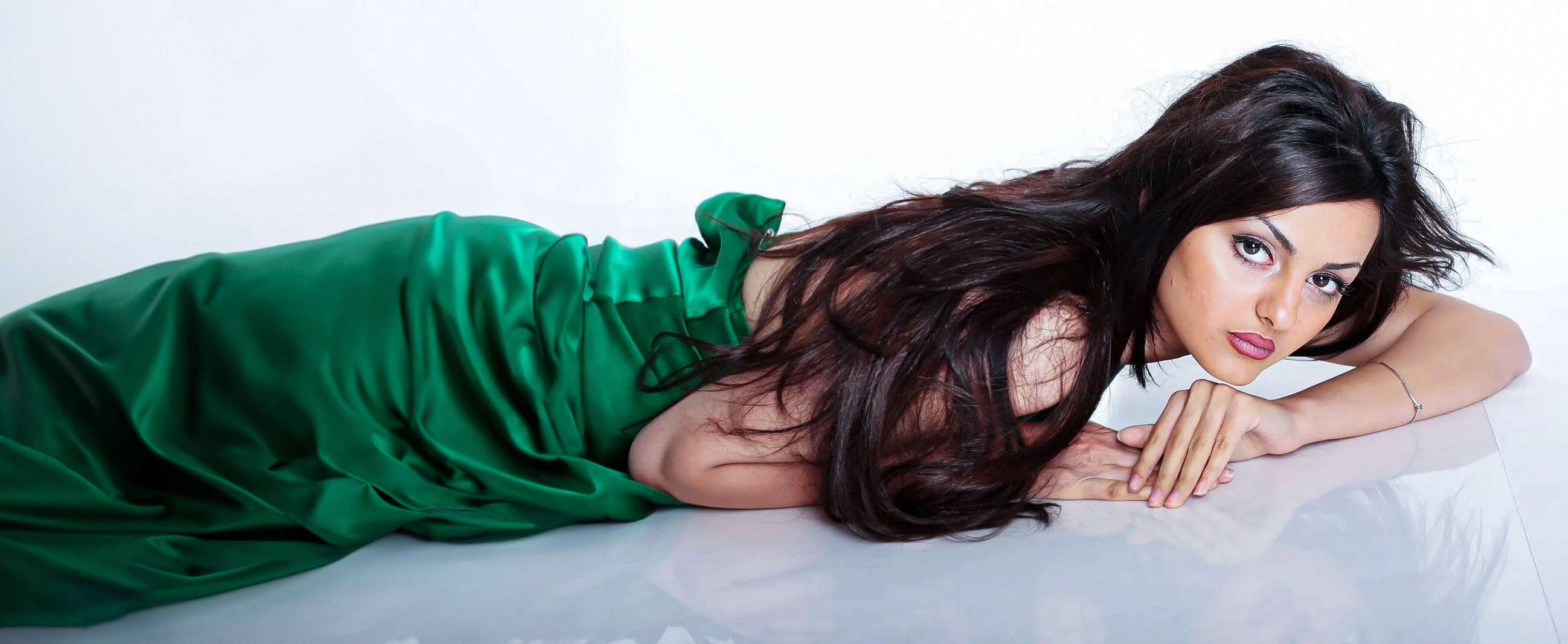
Jaberi for Dreamstime in 2009 (unretouched)

Raheleh then used Photoshop and beauty retouching to edit Mahlagha's photos to resemble traditional Persian miniature paintings. The publication of these images on Dreamstime and Raheleh's personal Flickr page played a significant role in introducing Mahlagha Jaberi. The photos quickly attracted the attention of many Iranian and Arab users and went viral on the internet.

Following this online fame among Iranian and Arab users, and relying on this strategy, Jaberi expanded her activity on the social media platforms Myspace and Facebook. She initially began her activity on Myspace under the pseudonym 'Aisha Unique', a name inspired by the Bollywood actress and beauty queen Aishwarya Rai. Sometime later, she continued her activities on these networks under her real name, 'Mahlagha Jaberi'.

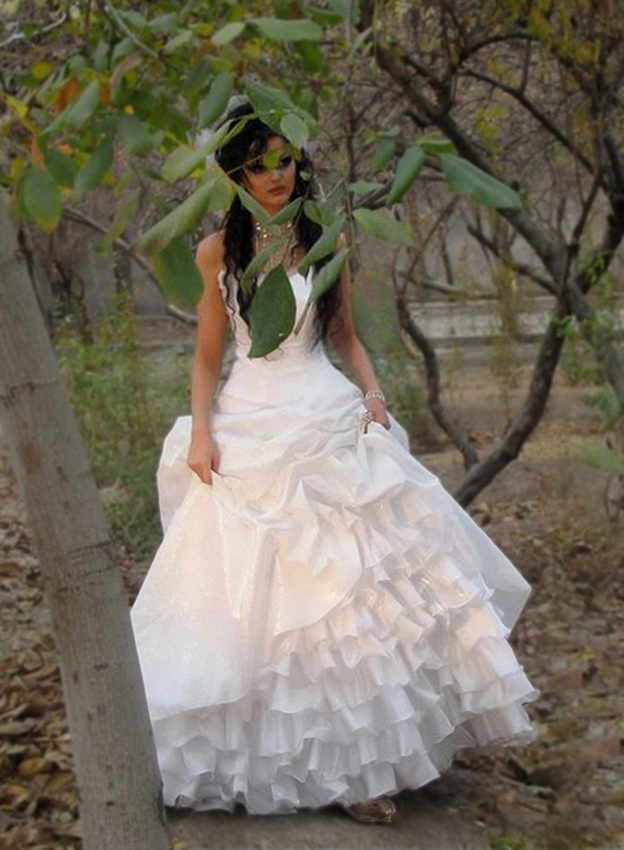
Jaberi's bridal shoot in 2007

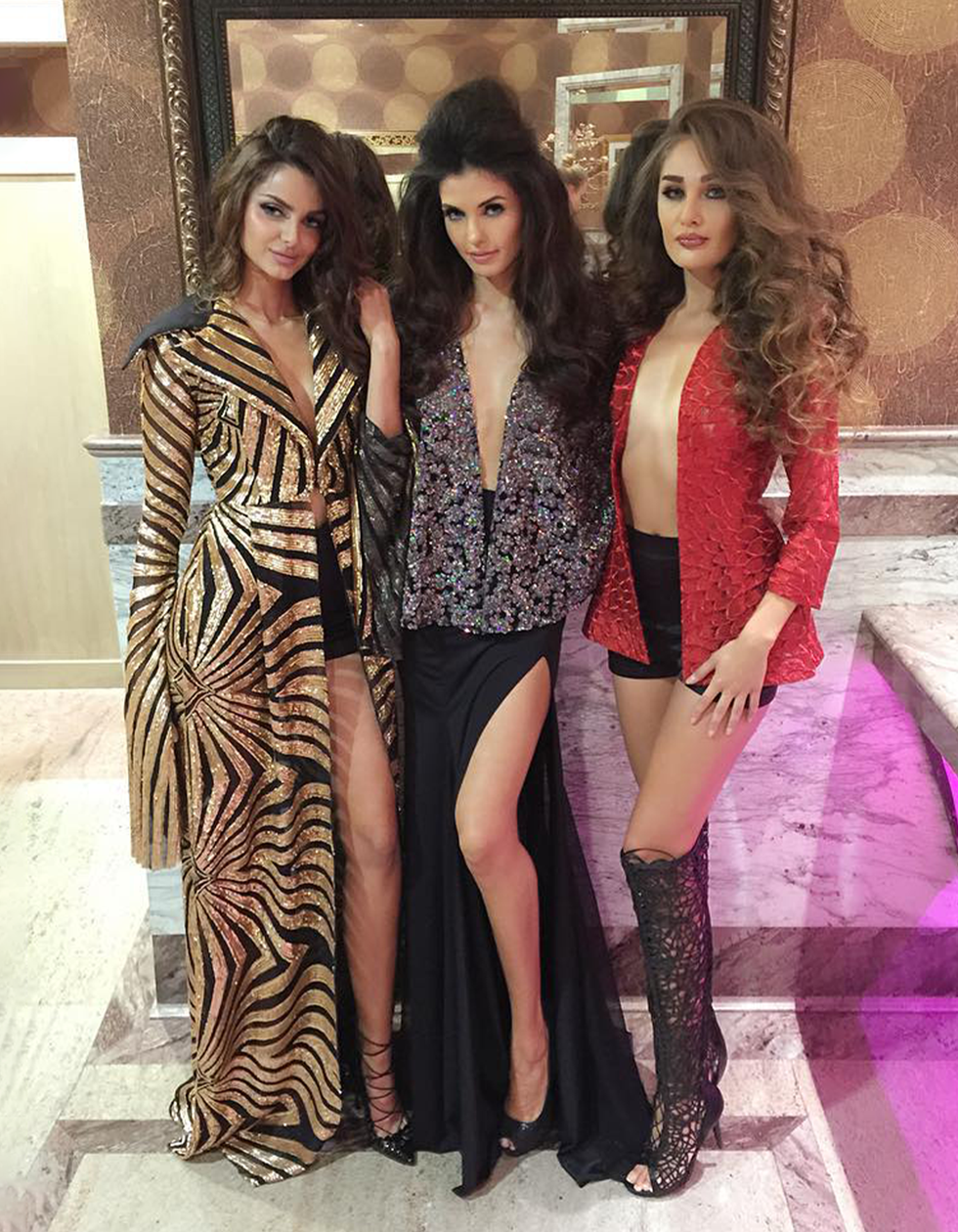
Jaberi, Osuna and Golzar at the Stello show in 2015

In 2009 at the age of 19, she immigrated from Iran to the United States with her mother Mehri and her sisters Raheleh and Arezou, settling in California. Jaberi later joined Instagram and at the age of 23 made her first runway appearance as a bridal model at the Negah Bridal Magazine fashion show held in San Diego in October 2012.

Jaberi then pursued her modeling career more seriously. In 2013 she began collaborating with Iranian fashion designer Pedram Pasha Taheri and in the same year worked with Los Angeles-based brands such as Stello and Walter Mendez. Between 2014 and 2015 she represented these brands on the runway at Los Angeles Fashion Week.

Continuing her modeling career, Jaberi began collaborating with the Saudi brand Hania in 2015, appearing as a model in the brand's advertising campaigns for Arabic abayas and kaftans. She subsequently began a long-term Instagram collaboration with Saudi fashion designer Eman Alajlan in 2018. Furthermore, during her appearances at the Cannes Film Festival, Jaberi walked the red carpet wearing designs by Arab fashion houses and designers, including Eman Alajlan, Rami Kadi, and Atelier Zuhra.

In 2023, Jaberi had a one-off advertising collaboration with the Saudi perfume brand Ibrahim Al-Qurashi and appeared in the promotional video for the "Pink Diamond" fragrance. In the same year she undertook another one-off promotional project for the brand Palm Designs appearing in their marketing campaigns showcasing Arabic abayas. Additionally, since 2023 Jaberi has served as the brand ambassador for the Glamour clinic in Riyadh which is managed by dr. Fadi Nasr and she has frequently highlighted her use of the professional services of this center in her social media content.

Alongside her fashion activities, Jaberi appeared in the 2022 music video for Ebi's song 'Horme To'.

Following a three-year period of focusing on modeling between 2013 and 2016, Jaberi shifted her primary focus to Instagram. In recent years, she has operated as an influencer, creating content chiefly centered on travel and lifestyle. Her output includes sharing personal photographs with her husband and publishing sponsored content for clothing brands, dietary and weight-loss products, hair extensions and vitamins, beauty and medical services, as well as hospitality and resort destinations.

== Personal life ==
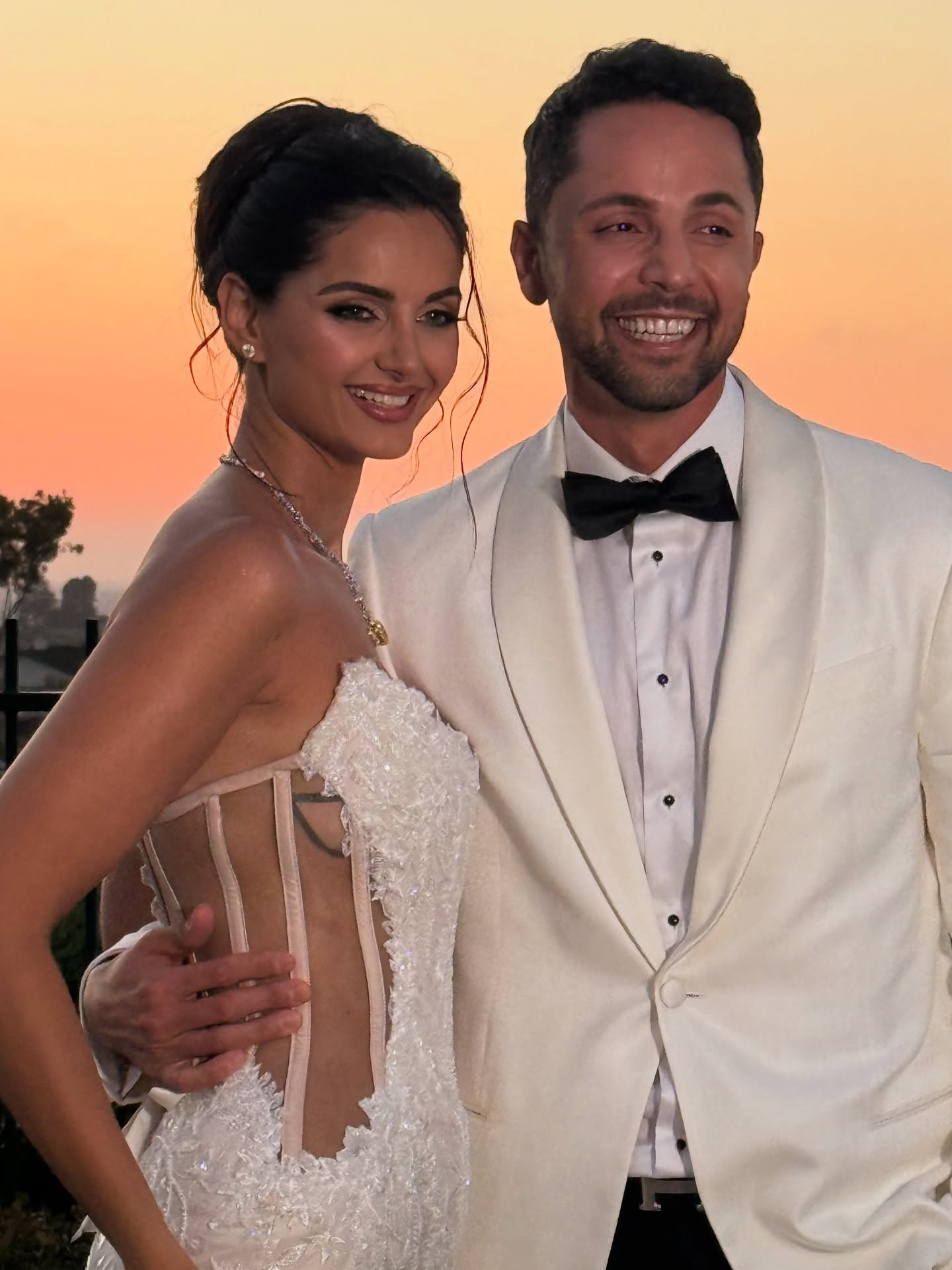
Mahlagha Jaberi and Armin Asadyari at their engagement, June 2025

Following a three-year relationship, Jaberi announced her engagement to Armin Asadyari, an Iranian photographer and videographer, in August 2025 by sharing their proposal video on Instagram.

In June 2026, the couple married at the historic Villa Erba on Lake Como, Italy.

== Political views ==
=== U.S.–Israel war with Iran ===
During the war waged by the United States and Israel against Iran, Jaberi emerged as a vocal supporter of military intervention against Iran, stating she voted for Donald Trump in 2024 election to support regime change. She joined the Iranian diaspora's "Thank You Trump" campaign and thanked Mohammed bin Salman for encouraging U.S. intervention. Through her participation in pro-Reza Pahlavi rallies in Washington, D.C., and Los Angeles, as well as her Instagram activity, she sought to frame U.S. military strikes as "humanitarian aid" intended to liberate the Iranian people.

In an interview with An-Nahar, Jaberi defended the joint U.S.–Israeli airstrikes, maintaining they targeted only strategic military centers without civilian casualties, and expressed gratitude for the sacrifices of U.S. military personnel. However, during an attack on a school in Minab, she shared Instagram contents blaming the Iranian government, which contrasted with international media reports and U.S. official assessments attributing the missile strike to U.S. forces.

Jaberi's endorsement of the military operations and her claims of zero civilian casualties, which she made while vacationing in Switzerland and criticizing opponents of the war, drew significant online backlash and led to a reported loss of over 100,000 Instagram followers. Additionally, during the 2026 Academy Awards, she criticized actor Javier Bardem's anti-war speech ("No to war, Free Palestine"), commenting that actors are paid to deliver such statements. Following the April 2026 ceasefire, and before internet access was fully restored in Iran, Jaberi deleted all her social media posts supporting the military intervention.

==== Support for Pahlavi ====
In March 2024, Jaberi attended a Nowruz celebration hosted by the Pahlavi family at the NUFDI event. Following this, she publicly declared her support for Reza Pahlavi through social media and by participating in rallies advocating for the restoration of the monarchy, shifting the focus of her activities toward supporting the monarchist movement.

==== Cannes Film Festival ====
In 2023, in protest against executions following the 2022–2023 protests in Iran, Jaberi appeared on the red carpet at the 76th Cannes Film Festival for the film The Old Oak wearing an outfit that included a necklace shaped like a noose. According to Jaberi, the phrase "Stop Executions" was written on the back of the garment, but festival security personnel prevented her from displaying it.

== Controversies and criticism ==
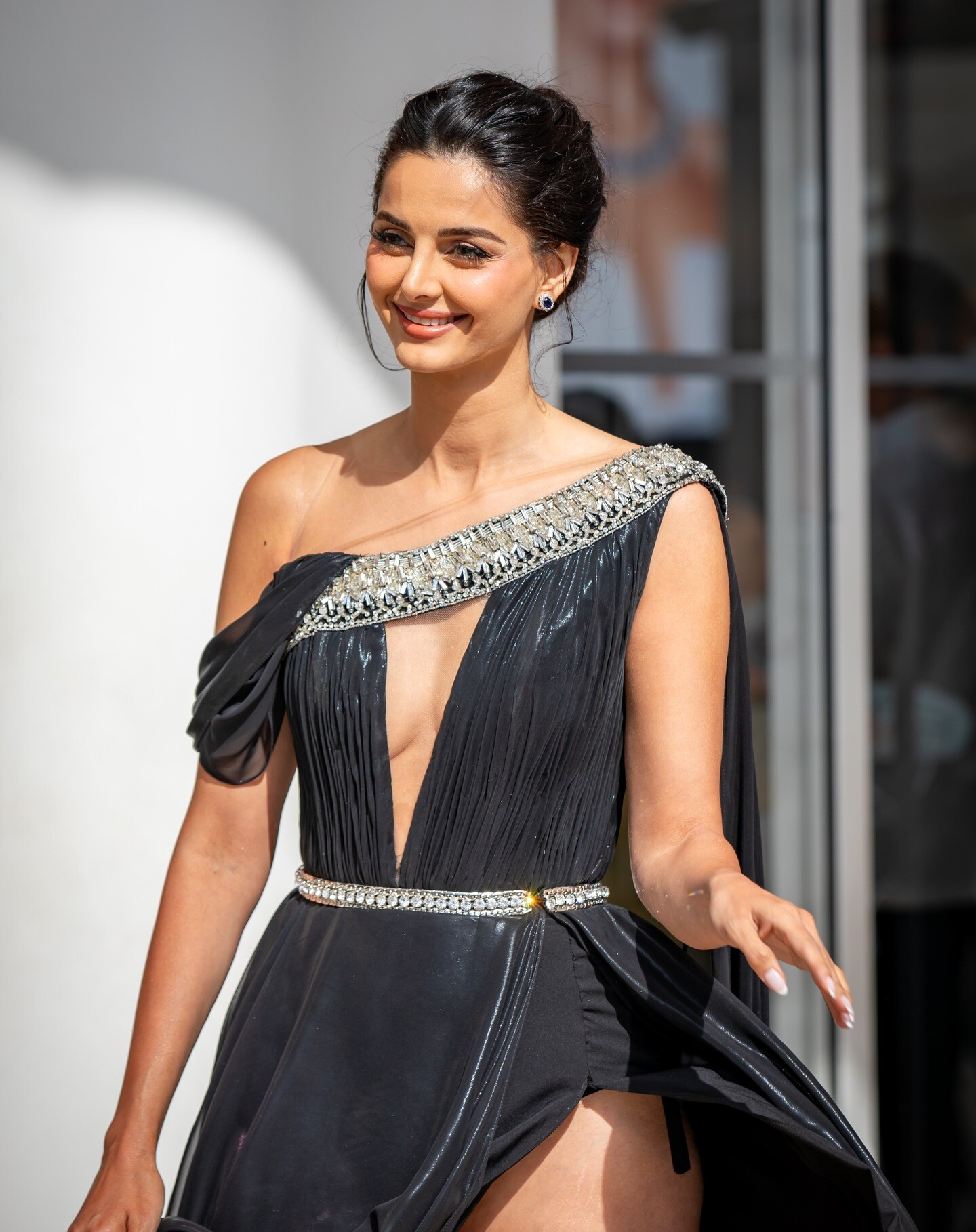
Jaberi at the Cannes 2025

=== Criticism ===
==== Photo retouching and eye color ====
In 2011, Jaberi gained widespread popularity on Facebook and MySpace through her selfies, with her green-gray eyes becoming her most prominent feature. However, in 2021, she revealed her natural eye color is dark brown, explaining she had used colored contact lenses and digital editing.

This reliance on beauty filters and retouching previously drew criticism on Reddit, which intensified after her Cannes Film Festival appearance, where unedited Getty images photos revealed a contrast with her self-published images.

==== Claim of appearing on the cover of Vanity Fair (Emirates edition) ====
In August 2024, Jaberi claimed on Instagram that she was featured on the cover of Vanity Fair Emarat, drawing congratulations from Independent Persian. However, Condé Nast, the official publisher of Vanity Fair, does not produce an edition in the United Arab Emirates or any Arab nation; its international titles are strictly limited to the US, UK, Italy, Spain, France, and Mexico. The website for Vanity Fair Emarat became inaccessible shortly after, which was cited as evidence that the publication was counterfeit and Jaberi's claim was unfounded.

=== Controversies ===
==== Burak Özçivit ====
In 2017, Jaberi drew attention by commenting "Seni Seviyoruz" ('We love you' in Turkish) on a post by prominent Turkish actor Burak Özçivit. While the comment increased her visibility among Turkish audiences and added to her fame, it also attracted negative reactions from both Iranian and Turkish social media users. In a subsequent interview with the Iranian magazine Pol, Jaberi said that Özçivit had blocked her on Instagram and that "people took my comment the wrong way and interpreted it as I was "in love with him;" which was not true".

==== Accusation of photo theft from Kira Lindbohm ====
In 2021, Finnish blogger Kira Lindbohm accused Jaberi of copyright infringement and unethical behavior. Lindbohm stated that Jaberi had digitally superimposed (photoshopped) her own face onto one of Lindbohm's 2019 travel photos from Tulum, Mexico, and published it on her Instagram account as her own.

==== Claim regarding the Assyrian Lamassu as Iranian ====
In July 2021, Jaberi faced backlash from Iraqi social media users after posting a photo of herself next to a Lamassu statue at the Louvre Museum, captioning it "My Iran." Critics pointed out that the ancient Assyrian artifact originated from modern-day Iraq, accusing her of misattributing Iraqi cultural heritage to Iran. Jaberi subsequently deleted the post.

== See also ==
- List of Iranian women

== Other websites ==
- Mahlagha Jaberi on Instagram
