= Fotosearch =

Stock photography company

Fotosearch Stock Photography
- Company type: Private
- Industry: Stock photography
- Founded: 1998
- Headquarters: Waukesha, Wisconsin, USA
- Website: www.fotosearch.com

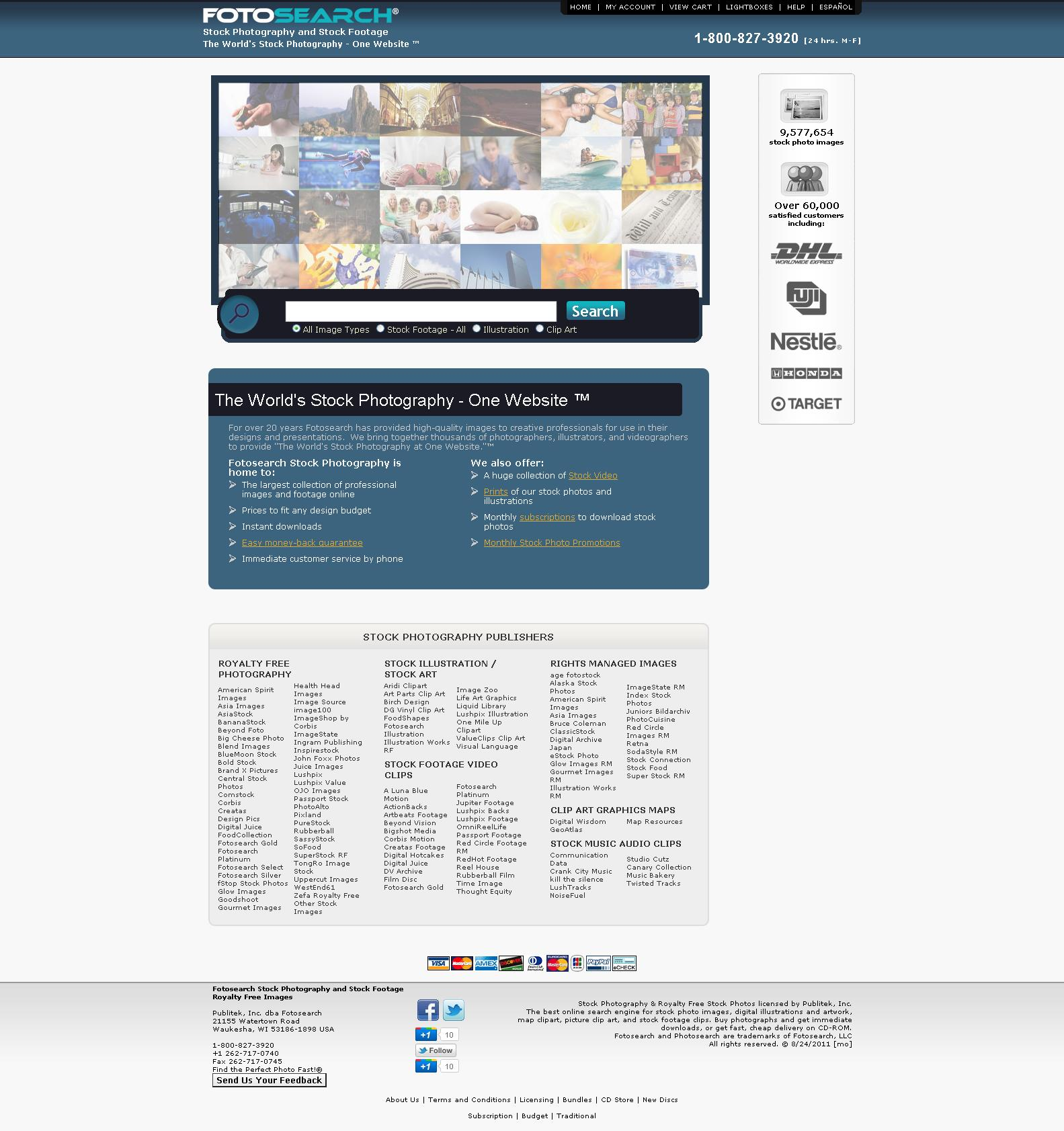
Fotosearch's Homepage

Fotosearch is a stock photography company, founded in 1998. The company sells royalty-free and rights-managed photography, illustrations, video footage, clipart, and audio clips.

The core feature of the site is its search feature which allows users to access its database of over 15 million images. The site is offered in over a dozen languages.

Images distributed by Fotosearch have been featured in People magazine, The New York Times, and on the February 6, 2006, cover of Newsweek. Stock footage from Fotosearch has been used in several movies and was used in the April 19, 2005 PBS episode of NOVA scienceNOW.

The company is located in Waukesha, Wisconsin.

== History ==
Fotosearch grew out of Publishing Perfection, founded in 1987, when electronic publishing was in its infancy. From the beginning the company targeted graphics and multimedia professionals through its monthly catalogue. The company specialized in providing the assistance required for buying graphics tools such as laser printers and image scanners. In addition to hardware and software the company began to offer high quality stock images in the early 1990s.

In 1996, Publishing Perfection launched a website offering an online catalogue, expanded product information and special discounts. In 1998, the company introduced the Fotosearch website where customers could search multiple stock photography publishers at a single site.
