= Dreamstime =

Online royalty-free microstock photography provider

DreamsTime.com
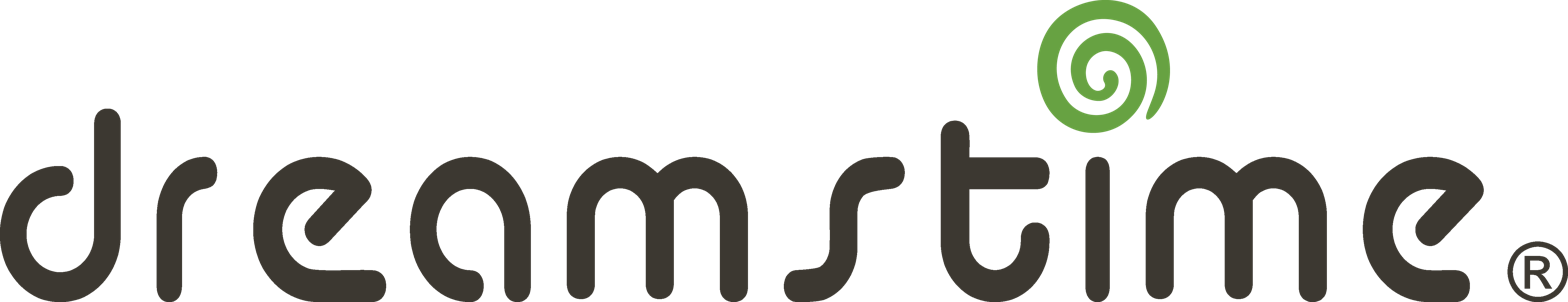
- Company type: Private
- Industry: Stock photography, stock footage, stock music
- Founded: June 11, 2000; 25 years ago
- Headquarters: Brentwood, Tennessee, United States
- Key people: Serban Enache (CEO)
- Products: Stock Photos by DreamsTime, DreamsTime Companion
- Services: Licensing of stock media
- Number of employees: 51-100
- Website: www.dreamstime.com

DreamsTime.com is an online royalty-free microstock provider based in Brentwood, Tennessee.

== History ==
The company started in the year 2000 as a website selling royalty-free images and was redesigned as a “community enabled” microstock provider in 2004, entering the market after its rivals iStock and Shutterstock. According to Nashville Business Journal, the company had sales approaching $10 million on the year 2007 with revenue growing expected to grow to $15 million in 2008. Their image database consisted of 25 million files from 170,000 different contributors from all around the world in the year 2014 and of 49 million files in November 2016.

== Facilities and staff ==
Dreamstime is headquartered in Brentwood, Tennessee, USA. Serban Enache is the CEO, Owner & Co-Founder of Dreamstime, a platform with 198 million stock images, and is currently the world's largest stock community with 46 million users.

== Business model ==
Dreamstime stock photographs are licensed around the world through the website with the individual contributors curating their own image portfolios and providing their own image info and search keywords with the company handling image hosting and providing the search tools to find the images. Like most other microstock companies, DreamsTime accepts anyone as contributor and relies on them to grow their file database. The images are licensed as royalty free, meaning one license has unlimited uses. Prices of the licenses images vary from $0.20 to thousands of dollars, of which the contributor receives a percentage. Besides stock photography and illustrations the company also allows curation of stock footage.

In 2011, DreamsTime reported a record year with more than 4.2 million customers.

As of September 2017, DreamsTime numbers 18,000,000 registered members, more than 300,000 contributing photographers and over 64,000,000 photos, illustrations, cliparts and vectors. With unique visitors exceeding 11,000,000 monthly, the agency occupies the 2nd place in stock photography audience and image licensing worldwide. (December 2007 historical data: 500,000 registered members, 26,000 contributors, 2,000,000 images online and 4,000,000 unique views).

DreamsTime's imagery is targeted for individuals, private sector and Fortune 500 companies.

== See also ==
- Stock photography / microstock photography
- Royalty free
