= FotoLibra =

fotoLibra was an open access picture library / stock agency. It was founded in 2002, produced a beta site in March 2004 and launched commercially in January 2005. It sold rights-managed and royalty-free images, with an approximate 80/20 split in favor of rights-managed. fotoLibra claimed to be the first open access fully digital stock agency. In July 2014 it had over 12,000 member photographers and 5,000 registered buyers in 170 countries. The service ceased in June 2020.

== Concept ==
The idea of fotoLibra came about when founder Gwyn Headley lost 120 years of his family’s photographs in a flood. With a background in book publishing, he felt that publishers would have a need for previously unpublished photographs and for images that could not be taken again. The original intention of the business was to provide a repository of family archives, but the ability to aggregate images uploaded from multiple sources and to make them available for download and purchase anywhere in the world caught the attention of contemporary photographers, and the company now operates largely as a general commercial digital picture library.

== Features ==
fotoLibra provides the facilities of a digital stock agency. In addition, buyers can filter searches with a variety of parameters, including hexadecimal color searches. Members receive a minimum of 50% of the net sales receipts from picture sales and all sales income received is paid into an escrow account to protect their interest. All pictures are vetted to ensure inappropriate content is not uploaded.

== Closure ==
VisConPro Ltd, trading as fotoLibra, closed for business on Monday 1 June 2020.
