= Mediakix =

American influencer marketing agency

Mediakix is an American influencer marketing agency based in Santa Monica, California.

== History ==
Mediakix was founded in 2011 in Venice Beach, Los Angeles, by Evan Asano.

Mediakix is recognized as the first influencer marketing agency and was ranked in 2020 as one of the top 15 influencer marketing companies by Business Insider. The firm brokered brand collaborations with social media creators across platforms such as YouTube, Instagram, and Twitch. Additionally, the agency published industry research and market data, including a widely cited spending estimate forecasting a US$15 billion influencer marketing valuation by 2022 and a 2019 survey regarding marketer challenges in influencer selection.

In 2017, Mediakix conducted an experiment demonstrating how brands could be misled by influencer’s inflated social media metrics. As reported by Mashable and New York Magazine, the agency created two fictitious Instagram accounts: one using images from a paid photoshoot with a model and another using stock photography. By purchasing followers and engagement, the accounts obtained sponsorship offers, illustrating the sophistication of fake-metric services and the challenges brands face in detecting fraud.

In 2019, Mediakix collaborated with the Wall Street Journal to publish an analysis on social media influencers sponsorship rates.

In March 2020, Mediakix was acquired by the holding company Stadiumred Group. Following the acquisition, back-office operations and financial decisions were transferred to the parent company.

Mediakix won two Shorty Awards in 2017 and 2018 and was named to the Inc. 500 list in 2016 and 2017 as one of the fastest-growing companies in the United States.
