= Pexels =

Free online media library

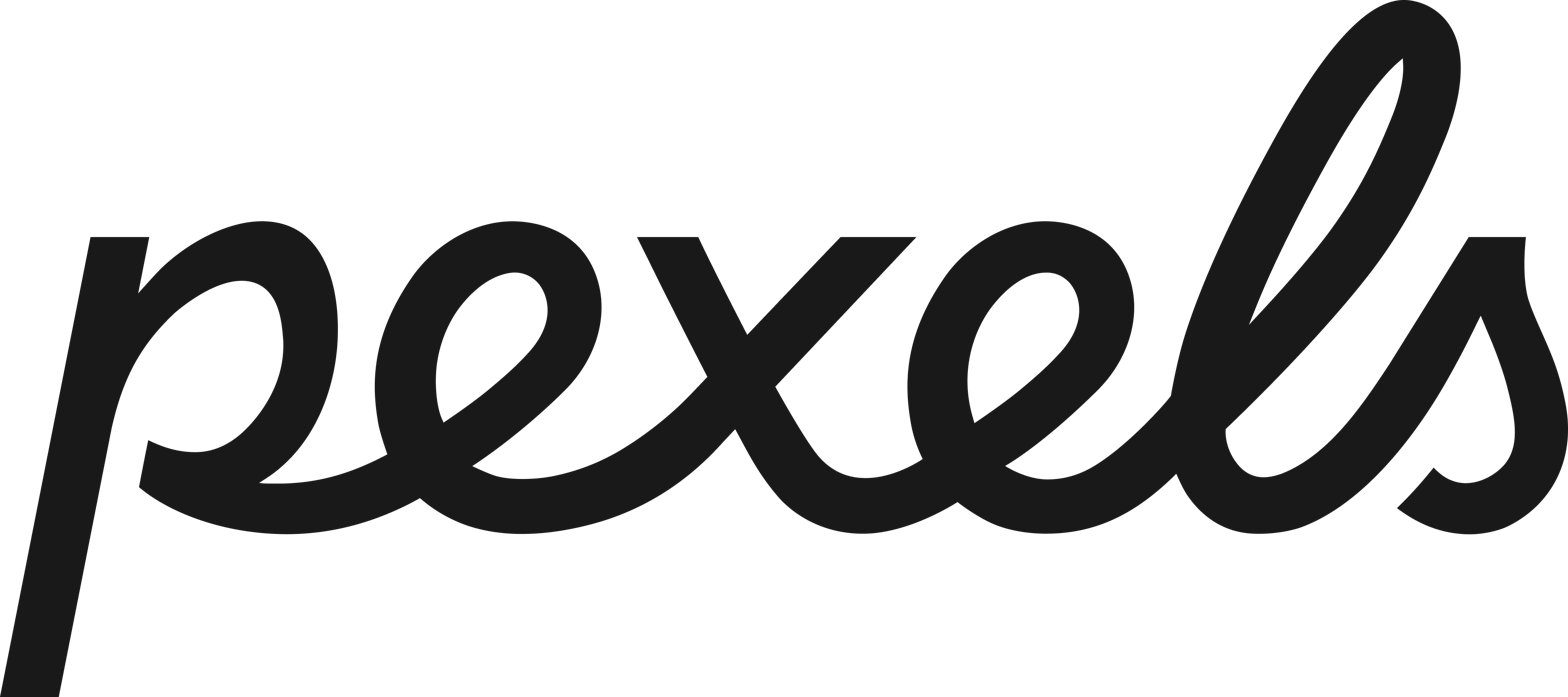
- Company type: Subsidiary
- Available in: 28 languages
- Founded: 2014
- Headquarters: Germany
- Area served: worldwide
- Owner: Canva
- Founders: Bruno Joseph, Ingo Joseph
- CEO: Clifford Obrecht
- Industry: Stock photography, Stock footage
- Employees: 40
- Website: www.pexels.com

Pexels is a provider of stock photography and stock footage. It was founded in Germany in 2014 and maintains a library with over 3.2 million free stock photos and videos.

== History ==
Pexels was founded by twin brothers Ingo and Bruno Joseph in Fuldabrück, Hesse. The brothers started the platform in 2014 with around 800 photos. Daniel Frese joined the team in 2015. The graphic design platform Canva acquired Pexels in 2018 for an undisclosed amount.

== Business model ==
Pexels provides media for online download, maintaining a library that contains over 3.2 million photos and videos, growing each month by roughly 200,000 files. The content is uploaded by the users and reviewed manually. Using and downloading the media is free, the website generates income through advertisements for paid content databases. There is also a donation option for users, and while attribution of the content creator is not required, it is appreciated. Through the merger with Canva, Pexels' database is available in the Canva application.

Pexels is committed to providing a diverse database, for example by including LGBTQ+ stock content, and through a partnership with Nappy, a platform that focuses on POC content.

=== License ===
Pexels originally offered photos under the CC0 Creative Commons license. Instead, it has their own set of rules for the use of their photos and footage. Their license does not permit the user to sell unaltered copies of a photo or video or to resell the content on other stock platforms. It is not allowed to suggest that the people or brands in the images or footage endorse a product or a brand. The photos or videos downloaded from Pexels cannot be used in trademarks, business names, or service marks. Identifiable people from the photos or videos cannot be shown in a negative or offensive way.

== Staff ==
The Pexels staff consists of the three founders, who live in Berlin, Germany, and a team of 40 who are based in Germany, other parts of Europe, and North and South America. The company does not have headquarters; all staff work from their respective homes. Bruno and Ingo Joseph were CEOs until November 2018, when Clifford Obrecht, founder of Canva, became CEO of the company. Bruno Joseph was reinstated as CEO in July 2020, but left the company in 2022.

== See also ==
- List of stock footage libraries
- List of online image archives
