= Can Stock Photo =

Stock photography provider

- Company type: Private
- Industry: Stock Photography
- Genre: Microstock
- Founded: 2004; 22 years ago
- Defunct: October 1, 2023; 2 years ago
- Headquarters: Halifax, Nova Scotia, Canada
- Members: 493,000 (2015)
- Website: www.canstockphoto.com Archived August 3, 2023, at the Wayback Machine

Can Stock Photo was a stock photography provider which licensed royalty-free images, photos, digital illustrations, picture clip art and footage files on behalf of photographers, illustrators, and videographers. Founded in 2004, it was one of the earliest microstock agencies. The Can Stock Photo website ceased to exist on October 1, 2023.

== Purchasing and use ==
The Can Stock Photo website hosted 21 million images provided by 40,000 photographers and artists worldwide. The site supported both subscription and credit licensing models. Can Stock Photo, unlike the majority of agencies in the industry, allowed users to license images individually without a membership.

Licensed images have been notably used by industry blogs such as TechCrunch, social media sites such as BuzzFeed, feature films such as Whiplash, news agencies such as CBS 5, and various YouTube videos, websites, and books.

== Contributors ==
Contributing photographers must apply before they are eligible to upload their images. The applicants must submit three images that are screened for quality and suitability. Once approved, photographers can begin uploading their work through the website. They supply keywords, categorize the images, and submit them for review, where each image is examined to ensure that it meets the standards of quality, usefulness and copyright laws. A model and property release is required when applicable. Contributors earn royalties each time their files are licensed.

Can Stock Photo received 25,000 contributor submissions per day.

== Dissolution ==
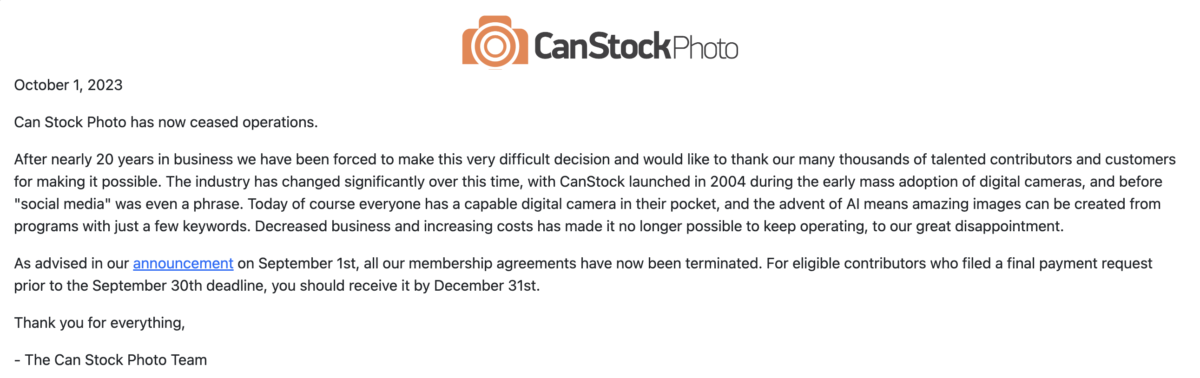
Screenshot of canstockphoto.com, which had ceased operations as of October 1, 2023

On September 1, 2023, Can Stock Photo announced that it would cease all commercial operations on October 1, 2023.

== See also ==
- Stock photography
- Microstock photography
