= Mecklermedia =

Liquidated American media corporation

Mecklermedia Corporation
- Company type: Public
- Industry: recruitment, event promotion
- Predecessor: Jupitermedia
- Founded: Westport, Connecticut (1994)
- Defunct: 2015
- Fate: Liquidated
- Headquarters: Darien, Connecticut, New York, United States
- Key people: Alan M. Meckler, CEO/Director

Mecklermedia (formerly Internet.com LLC, Jupitermedia Inc., Mediabistro Inc. and WebMediaBrands Corporation) was a U.S.-based corporation. The original WebMediaBrands was established in 1994, and headquartered in New York. Founded by Alan M. Meckler and Tristan Louis, the company provided business-to-business (B2B) services for creative, business and information technology professionals, including recruitment and event promotion.

Until 2014, the company also operated a group of websites aimed towards the B2B market—particularly blogs covering various aspects of the media industry. In August 2014, Mediabistro sold its editorial properties to Prometheus Global Media, a subsidiary of Guggenheim Partners, for $8 million.

The company announced it would liquidate itself on December 22, 2015.

The Mediabistro brand and job board, which had been sold separately in 2014, continued to operate independently under subsequent ownership.

== History ==
In 1994, Alan Meckler, then CEO of Mecklermedia, created MecklerWeb as an addendum to his offerings in print (Virtual Reality World, CDrom World, and Internet World) and conferences (Internet World, Virtual Reality World). In 1995, as advertising-supported publishing emerged as a viable business model on the Web, the Website was relaunched by Tristan Louis under the name iWorld and began to publish content for the nascent Internet industry. As the Internet World conference prospered, iWorld set out on a strategy of acquiring successful Websites that were focused on technology content, such as Webopedia, SearchEngineWatch and WebReference. In 1997, the online division was renamed internet.com, after acquiring rights to the domain name from The Internet Company.

In 1998, Mecklermedia Corp. was acquired by Penton Media and the online assets were spun off into a separate company called Internet.com LLC. Internet.com went public on the NASDAQ in the second half of 1999 (trading as INTM). In 1999, internet.com Corp. launched the Search Engine Strategies conference and in 2000, it acquired Earthweb and incorporated it into the JupiterWeb network. In 2002, the company purchased the Jupiter Research business from Jupiter Media Metrix and renamed itself from INT Media to Jupitermedia, with a new stock ticker symbol JUPM.

In 2004, the company started acquiring image assets and developed Jupiterimages as a separate stock photography division, which operated two online image libraries, stock.xchng, a library of free-to-use photographs and illustrations, and StockXpert, a low-cost Microstock photography site.

In 2005, Jupitermedia sold SearchEngineWatch to Incisive Media. In 2006, Jupitermedia sold its JupiterResearch division to MCG Capital Corporation. In 2007, the company operated as two divisions, JupiterImages and Jupiter Online Media. In 2007, mediabistro.com won the Small Business of the Year award from the Manhattan Chamber of Commerce.

In 2008, JupiterResearch was acquired by Forrester Research.

In October 2008, Jupitermedia announced that they would be selling their online images division, Jupiterimages, to the stock photography agency Getty Images for $96 million in cash. The sale went ahead in February 2009; Jupiterimages (including the sites stock.xchng and StockXpert) is now a wholly owned subsidiary of Getty.

Following the sale, JupiterMedia changed its name to WebMediaBrands Inc. In August 2009, Quinstreet Inc. acquired the Internet.com division of WebMediaBrands for $18 million. Among the sites sold as part of Internet.com were InternetNews.com, Webopedia.com, ServerWatch.com, DatabaseJournal.com, Datamation.com, eSecurityPlanet.com, EnterpriseNetworkingPlanet.com, SmallBusinessComputing.com and Developer.com.

WebMediaBrands changed its name to Mediabistro on June 13, 2013.

On May 29, 2014, Mediabistro announced that it would sell its publishing assets to Prometheus Global Media, a subsidiary of Guggenheim Partners, for $8 million. The remainder of the company, including its trade show operations, were retained under the name Mecklermedia.

The Mediabistro brand and job board continued to operate under subsequent ownership.

On September 10, 2015, MecklerMedia announced that, in conjunction with New York-based Sagamore III LLC, that it had purchased 3DPrint.com and related assets from Forum Advertising LLC of Cape Coral, Florida. The purchase included a 25% equity position in 3DPrintBoard.com.

On December 16, 2016, Mediabistro's former book publishing blog, GalleyCat, announced that it was ceasing publication.
