= Gwyn Headley =

British historian and writer (born 1946)

- Born: 1946 (age 79–80)
- Education: Haileybury and Imperial Service College; Westminster City School; Saint Martin's School of Art
- Occupations: historian and writer

Gwyn Headley (born 1946 in Harlech) is a British historian and writer.

== Education and early life ==
As a child Headley lived in Accra, Gold Coast (now Ghana); Krumpendorf, Austria; Berlin, Germany; Warsaw, Poland; Westmalle, Belgium and Paris, France before his family settled in Chelsea in 1959. He was educated at Haileybury and Imperial Service College, Hertford, Westminster City School, London, and at Saint Martin's School of Art, London.

Living in Chelsea in the 1960s, he formed The Sloane Squares, a beat group which played many venues across the capital, supporting John Lee Hooker, Jimi Hendrix, Pink Floyd, the Small Faces, Eric Clapton, Peter Frampton and others. Lead singer Pete Gage later became the front man for Dr. Feelgood.

He now lives in London and Harlech.

== Business ==
He began work in book publishing in 1967 at George Newnes and started his first consultancy Headley Hesketh Associates in 1976. This evolved into HPR, a publishing and theatre marketing consultancy which promoted several West End hits and had nine No. 1 best-sellers, including The Country Diary of an Edwardian Lady. In 1991 with Keith Price he launched Pavilions of Splendour Ltd, the first estate agency to deal exclusively in listed buildings, and which in 1993 became the first UK estate agency to have a website. The agency closed after Keith Price died in 2004.

In 2002 HPR was taken over by fotoLibra. the first open access, entirely digital picture library was created by Headley in 2002 and launched in 2004. A digital publishing company within the group, Heritage Ebooks, was launched in 2011 with forty titles.

== Mah-Jong ==
Headley is President of the British Mah-Jong Association. With Yvonne Seeley he wrote Know The Game: Mah-Jong in 1977. The book has sold over 500,000 copies and is the standard rule book for the game in Britain and the Commonwealth.

== Follies ==
An enthusiast of eccentric architecture since childhood, his first book on follies, written with Dutch art historian Wim Meulenkamp, was published for the National Trust for Places of Historic Interest or Natural Beauty by Jonathan Cape in 1986. The publication of the book led to the foundation of the amenity society and charity The Folly Fellowship, of which Headley was President. He has since written and co-written five further printed books on the subject, and forty ebooks. He describes a folly as 'a misunderstood building', and elaborates on this in an introduction: "Ideally, [a folly] should be a big, Gothick, ostentatious, over-ambitious and useless structure, preferably with a wildly improbable local legend attached – but in real life it must be admitted that follies defy even such broad definitions. That's half the pleasure of the things: if they could be categorised and catalogued and pinned down like specimen butterflies we would lose that frisson of excitement and mystery when another unidentified ghostly grey ruin looms up out of a wet wood. A folly is essentially a misunderstood building, because folly can only lie in the eye of the beholder."

== Typography ==
Headley's first essay on typography, Fabulous Fonts, was published by Pomegranate in 2001. Cassell Illustrated published his Encyclopaedia of Fonts in 2005. The author blurb described him as follows: "Gwyn Headley’s comfortably blurred memories of the 1960s include failing to become a rock star (despite playing with Hendrix, Clapton, Pink Floyd, the Small Faces, John Lee Hooker and others) and instead discovering a passion for typography at St. Martin’s School of Art in London’s Charing Cross Road. He has somehow combined a lifetime in publishing with writing books on architecture, follies, fonts and Mah-Jong; selling listed buildings; and founding fotoLibra.com, the world’s first entirely digital picture library. He has spent six months of his life at the Frankfurt Book Fair and to his eternal regret has never scored a try for Llanelli or Wales."

== Blogs ==
Headley currently writes two blogs, the fotoLibra Pro BlogfotoLibra Pro Blog, which deals with photography, image sales and digital publishing, and fotoLibrarianFrom Harlech to London, his personal blog which concentrates on his interests, hobbies and opinions. The latter is notable for its typically British self-deprecating autobiography: "Gwyn describes himself as enthusiastic, lazy, persistent, creative, fat, well-educated, pedantic, polite, greedy, gentle, prejudiced, kind, unreliable, well-meaning, curious, shy, gregarious, snobbish, confident, cowardly, optimistic, comfortable, irritable, at ease, nervous, thirsty, tired, willing, competent, unselfconscious, spry, hard-working, querulous, prolix and cheerful. His favourite word is Sharawaggi, he would like his double helix to combine musicality and common sense, he has a huge vocabulary in several languages and no grammar in any. He enjoys drinking, eating, women, reading, writing, urban walking, typefaces, architecture, guitars, rugby, cricket, F1, Wales, London, the USA and Europe. He dislikes ‘features’, ‘slebrities’ and ‘communities’. He describes enjoyment as a two-bottle lunch with an old friend. He is married, with a tortoise, two mogs and a Golden Retriever."

== Ffordd Pen Llech ==
In 2019 Headley led the successful campaign to get Ffordd Pen Llech in his hometown of Harlech, North West Wales, recognised by Guinness World Records as the steepest street in the world.

== Personal life ==
He married Yvonne Seeley in 2008 at St John's Chapel in the Tower of London.

== Books ==
- Know The Game: Mah-Jong with Yvonne Seeley (1977) originally published by EP Publishing, Wakefield, now by A & C Black, ISBN 978-0-7136-8951-8.
- Follies: A National Trust Guide with Wim Meulenkamp (1986), Jonathan Cape, ISBN 0-224-02105-2.
- Follies: A Guide to Rogue Architecture with Wim Meulenkamp (1990), Jonathan Cape, ISBN 0-224-02790-5.
- Architectural Follies in America (1996), John Wiley & Sons, ISBN 0-471-14362-6.
- London Sight Unseen with Lord Snowdon (1999), Weidenfeld & Nicolson, ISBN 0-297-82490-2.
- Follies Grottoes and Garden Buildings with Wim Meulenkamp (1999), Aurum Press, ISBN 1-85410-625-2.
- The Encyclopaedia of Fonts(2005), Cassell Illustrated, ISBN 1-84403-206-X.
- Follies: Fabulous, Fanciful and Frivolous Buildings (2012), National Trust, ISBN 978-1-907892-30-1.

== Magazines ==
- Follies: The International Magazine for Follies, Grottoes and Garden Buildings, Editor, 1987–95.
- Executive Excellence Europe, Editor, 1996–99.

== Knowledge Cards ==
- An Architectural Vocabulary, (2000) Pomegranate, ISBN 0-7649-1120-1.
- Fabulous Fonts, (2001) Pomegranate, ISBN 0-7649-1749-8.
- What Happened Here? England, (2002) Pomegranate, ISBN 0-7649-2796-5.
- Cockney Rhyming Slang, (2003) Pomegranate, ISBN 978-0-7649-2138-4.
- What Happened Here? London, (2004) Pomegranate, ISBN 978-0-7649-2381-4.

== Ebooks ==
- ’’Follies of Bath, Bristol & Avon’‘, (2010) Heritage Ebooks, ISBN 978-1-908619-01-3
- ’’Follies of Bedfordshire & Cambridgeshire’‘, (2010) Heritage Ebooks, ISBN 978-1-908619-02-0
- ’’Follies of Berkshire’‘, (2010) Heritage Ebooks, ISBN 978-1-908619-03-7
- ’’Follies of Buckinghamshire’‘, (2010) Heritage Ebooks, ISBN 978-1-908619-04-4
- ’’Follies of Cheshire’‘, (2010) Heritage Ebooks, ISBN 978-1-908619-05-1
- ’’Follies of Cornwall’‘, (2010) Heritage Ebooks, ISBN 978-1-908619-00-6
- ’’Follies of Derbyshire’‘, (2010) Heritage Ebooks, ISBN 978-1-908619-07-5
- ’’Follies of Cumbria’‘, (2010) Heritage Ebooks, ISBN 978-1-908619-06-8
- ’’Follies of Devon’‘, (2010) Heritage Ebooks, ISBN 978-1-908619-08-2
- ’’Follies of Dorset’‘, (2010) Heritage Ebooks, ISBN 978-1-908619-09-9
- ’’Follies of County Durham’‘, (2010) Heritage Ebooks, ISBN 978-1-908619-10-5
- ’’Follies of East Sussex’‘, (2010) Heritage Ebooks, ISBN 978-1-908619-11-2
- ’’Follies of Essex’‘, (2010) Heritage Ebooks, ISBN 978-1-908619-12-9
- ’’Follies of Gloucestershire’‘, (2010) Heritage Ebooks, ISBN 978-1-908619-13-6
- ’’Follies of Hampshire and the Isle of Wight’‘, (2010) Heritage Ebooks, ISBN 978-1-908619-14-3
- ’’Follies of Herefordshire’‘, (2010) Heritage Ebooks, ISBN 978-1-908619-15-0
- ’’Follies of Hertfordshire’‘, (2010) Heritage Ebooks, ISBN 978-1-908619-16-7
- ’’Follies of Kent’‘, (2010) Heritage Ebooks, ISBN 978-1-908619-17-4
- ’’Follies of Lancashire’‘, (2010) Heritage Ebooks, ISBN 978-1-908619-18-1
- ’’Follies of Leicestershire & Rutland’‘, (2010) Heritage Ebooks, ISBN 978-1-908619-19-8
- ’’Follies of Lincolnshire’‘, (2010) Heritage Ebooks, ISBN 978-1-908619-20-4
- ’’Follies of Liverpool and Manchester’‘, (2010) Heritage Ebooks, ISBN 978-1-908619-21-1
- ’’Follies of London’‘, (2010) Heritage Ebooks, ISBN 978-1-908619-22-8
- ’’Follies of Norfolk’‘, (2010) Heritage Ebooks, ISBN 978-1-908619-23-5
- ’’Follies of North & East Yorkshire’‘, (2010) Heritage Ebooks, ISBN 978-1-908619-24-2
- ’’Follies of Northamptonshire’‘, (2010) Heritage Ebooks, ISBN 978-1-908619-25-9
- ’’Follies of Northumberland’‘, (2010) Heritage Ebooks, ISBN 978-1-908619-26-6
- ’’Follies of Nottinghamshire’‘, (2010) Heritage Ebooks, ISBN 978-1-908619-27-3
- ’’Follies of Oxfordshire’‘, (2010) Heritage Ebooks, ISBN 978-1-908619-28-0
- ’’Follies of Shropshire’‘, (2010) Heritage Ebooks, ISBN 978-1-908619-29-7
- ’’Follies of Somerset’‘, (2010) Heritage Ebooks, ISBN 978-1-908619-30-3
- ’’Follies of South Yorkshire’‘, (2010) Heritage Ebooks, ISBN 978-1-908619-31-0
- ’’Follies of Staffordshire’‘, (2010) Heritage Ebooks, ISBN 978-1-908619-32-7
- ’’Follies of Suffolk’‘, (2010) Heritage Ebooks, ISBN 978-1-908619-33-4
- ’’Follies of Surrey’‘, (2010) Heritage Ebooks, ISBN 978-1-908619-34-1
- ’’Follies of Warwickshire’‘, (2010) Heritage Ebooks, ISBN 978-1-908619-35-8
- ’’Follies of West Sussex’‘, (2010) Heritage Ebooks, ISBN 978-1-908619-36-5
- ’’Follies of West Yorkshire’‘, (2010) Heritage Ebooks, ISBN 978-1-908619-37-2
- ’’Follies of Wiltshire’‘, (2010) Heritage Ebooks, ISBN 978-1-908619-38-9
- ’’Follies of Worcestershire’‘, (2010) Heritage Ebooks, ISBN 978-1-908619-39-6

== Apps ==
- Aaron's Time Machine: London, with Neil Smith (2010).
