= Alan Meckler =

American internet pioneer

Alan Marshall Meckler (born 1945) is an American internet pioneer and publishing executive. Meckler started his own publishing business in 1971 which evolved into Mecklermedia Corporation in the 1990s until the company was acquired by Penton Media in November 1998, and founded several print magazines including Virtual Reality World, CD-ROM World, and Internet World. Mediabistro was purchased in 2007 and later sold to Prometheus Global Media in 2014. Currently Meckler is CEO of 3DR Holdings LLC based in New York City which offers news coverage of the additive manufacturing fields and quantum computing through websites and trade shows.

== Early life and education ==
Born in New York City in 1945, Meckler was raised in Great Neck, NY. Meckler attended the Pennington School 1959-1963. He attended Tulane University 1963-1965 and received his BA from Columbia College 1967, a Masters (1968) and Ph.D. (1980) in American history from Columbia University. He is also the brother of director Nancy Meckler.

His doctoral dissertation Scholarly Micropublishing in America was published by Greenwood Press in 1982. He is also editor of The Draft and its Enemie published by the University of Illinois Press (1974). His book The Internet's First Entrepreneur was published in 2021. Meckler served in the New York Air National Guard and the United States Army Reserve (1969-1975).

== WebMediaBrands ==
Meckler is credited with being the first American CEO of a public company to use social media to discuss financial results and other aspects of the performance of a public company. Beginning in 2010 Meckler used Twitter (now X) to provide information about his public company’s quarterly financials ″WebMediaBrands″. The SEC investigated Meckler’s use of Twitter to convey such information and concluded in 2010 that the practice was acceptable.

== Trade shows ==
Meckler is known for creating the trade show Internet World in 1993. The event started with a few hundred people and no exhibits. By 1996 it attracted 75,000 attendees at the Javits Center in New York City and was also produced annually in Los Angeles and Chicago as well as in many international venues. Meckler also created the event Search Engine Strategies trade show in New York City in 1999. Since 2013 Meckler has been producing trade shows for the 3D printing industry. In 2014, with his son John, Meckler created a mutual fund devoted to 3D printing and additive manufacturing. 3D Printing and Technology Fund was the first mutual fund worldwide devoted to this investment coverage.

Meckler also launched a trade show for the virtual currency Bitcoin. The first show was launched in New York City in July 2013. In May 2015, Meckler launched a show "RoboUniverse" in New York City.

Meckler also started Inside Quantum Technology (IQT) trade series in 2019. IQT currently is produced in several Scandinavia countries, New York City and Incheon, South Korea.
