= Pixabay =

Free online media library

Pixabay GmbH
- Website type: Stock photography, stock footage, stock vector graphics, stock music
- Available in: 26 languages
- Owners: Canva, Hans Braxmeier, Simon Steinberger
- Creators: Hans Braxmeier; Simon Steinberger
- Website: pixabay.com
- Launched: 24 November 2010; 15 years ago

Pixabay.com is a free stock photography and royalty-free stock media website. It is used for sharing photos, illustrations, vector graphics, film footage, stock music, sound effects, 3D models and animated GIFs, exclusively under the custom Pixabay Content License, which generally allows the free use of the material with some restrictions. The site's images are allowed to be used for free without attribution, and allowed to be modified and adapted into new works. Pixabay does not allow users to sell or distribute the content as is, use it commercially if it contains recognizable trademarks, or use photos in immoral, illegal, misleading, or deceptive ways.

Photos on the service cover a "wide range of subjects." The total number of assets is over 6.3 million as of September, 2026, with a total download tally of over 6 billion and over 400 thousand creators.

== History ==
The site was founded in November 2010 in Ulm, Germany, by Hans Braxmeier and Simon Steinberger.

Prior to 9 January 2019, Pixabay images were released under the CC0 declaration, which deeds content into the public domain. On that day, it imposed a custom, more restrictive license on all of its content, and changed its license to the "Pixabay License", which prohibits the sale of unaltered copies of the licensed works, or distribution as stock images or wallpapers. As the terms of CC0 explicitly indicate that the surrender into the public domain is "irrevocable" once completed, images that had already been released under CC0 prior to the change in license remain available through various mirrors distributing under the original CC0 declaration.

In November 2018, Pixabay was acquired by the Australian design and publishing platform Canva.

On 17 April 2023, significant changes to Pixabay’s terms of service came into effect. This included the modification of the "Pixabay License" to the "Content License", as well as the reinstatement of the CC0 license, for content uploaded to Pixabay prior to 9 January 2019.
