= FootageBank =

American stock footage company

- Industry: Stock Footage
- Headquarters: Los Angeles, California, United States,
- Website: www.FootageBank.com

FootageBank is a stock footage company based in Los Angeles, California founded by Paula Lumbard. FootageBank is dedicated to shooting and aggregating collections of video clips to serve the demand for large format rights managed content in the film and television marketplace.

The FootageBank library holds over 200 video producers, such as Randall Dark, cinematographers, and production companies from around the globe.

== History ==
FootageBank opened in the spring of 2002 by footage industry veterans Paula Lumbard and Carol Martin. Lumbard and Martin earned their footage chops at Film Bank and Corbis Motion.
