= Representative image =

The search engine DuckDuckGo shows an image of Jimmy Wales when one searches "founder of Wikipedia."

A representative image is an indirect visual depiction that summarizes events, brands, or services. Representative images are intended to quickly convey information through a singular image, allowing for quicker understanding; for example, when that particular event has not been visually captured or is visually available. The accuracy of the representative image in areas such as tourism can significantly affect users using search engines. The degree of representativeness can vary significantly.

== See also ==
- Representation (arts)
