= Oddball Film+Video =

- Industry: Stock footage/media post-production
- Founder: Stephen Parr
- Headquarters: San Francisco, US
- Services: Stock footage licensing and research services
- Website: oddballfilms.com

Oddball Film+Video or Oddball Films is a stock footage company based in San Francisco, California. It was founded in 1984 by Stephen Parr, an archivist, imagemaker and writer. He was the director of Oddball Film+Video until his death in 2017.

== Background ==
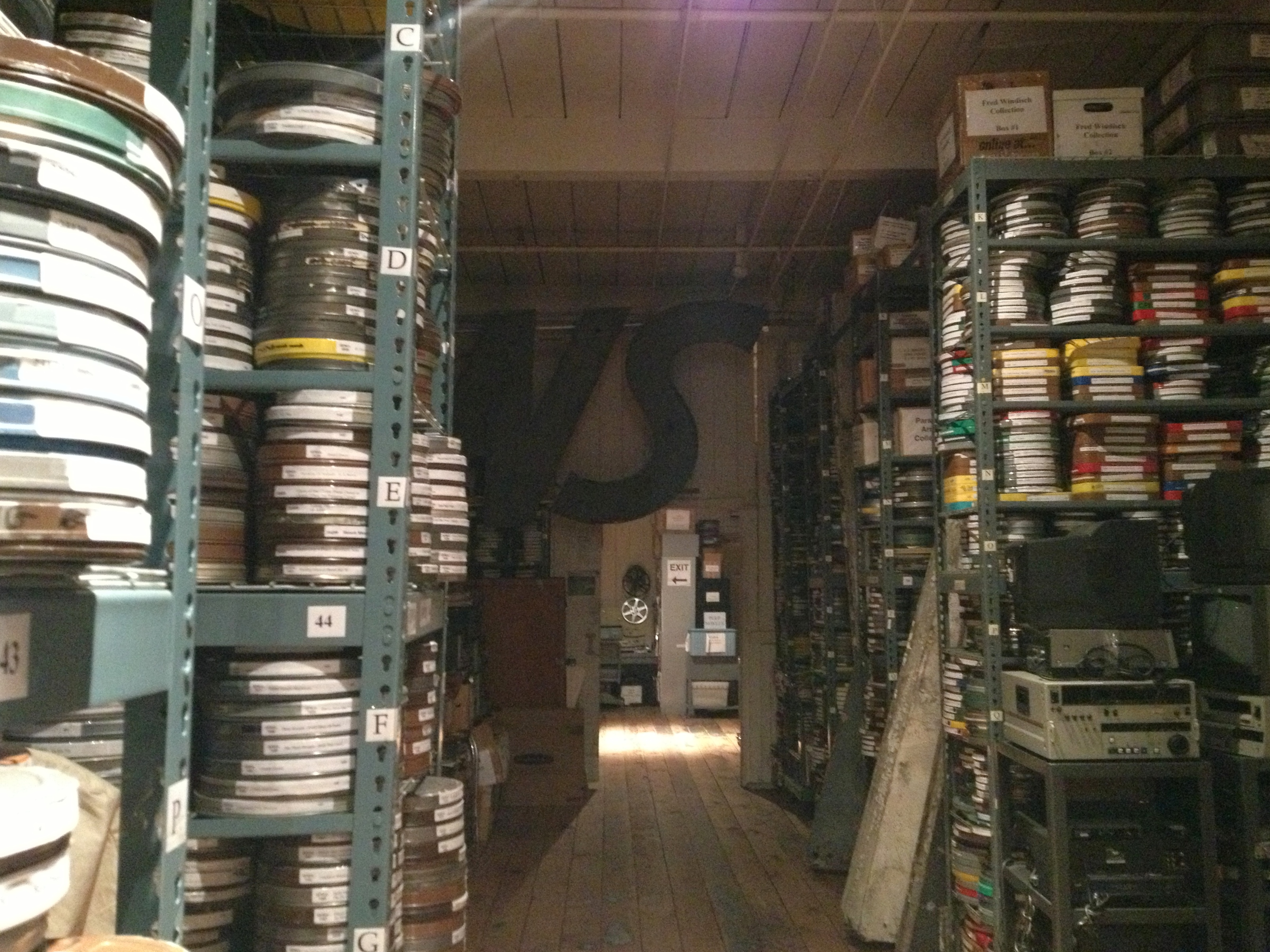
Part of the interior of the archive. The wall displays part of a "17 Reasons Why" sign that used to be on top of a building in the Mission.

Oddball Film+Video has provided stock footage for feature films such as Milk, documentaries like Ballets Russes and The Weather Underground, television programs like MythBusters, websites such as Boing Boing, and web projects around the world. Oddball Film+Video's holdings consist of over 50,000 archival and contemporary 35mm, 16mm and HD media elements, many digitized for immediate online distribution.

For several years, Oddball Films hosted weekly public events where it presented rarely-screened genres of cinema, avant-garde films, and ethno-cultural documentaries.

== Business ==
Oddball's international client list includes ABC News, The American Experience, BBC Television, Canal+, Discovery Channel, MTV, Nokia, NBC Universal, Walt Disney Pictures and Yahoo.
