= Nimia =

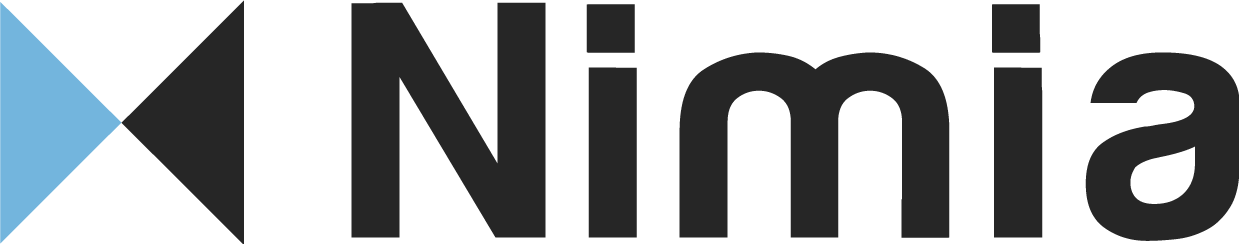
- Industry: Stock footage
- Founded: 2013
- Founder: Zachary McIntosh & Eric Harrison
- Headquarters: Seattle, Washington, United States
- Website: nimia.com

Nimia, founded in 2013 by Zachary McIntosh and Eric Harrison, is an international technology company specializing in video licensing (stock footage), management, and distribution related products and services. These include a stock footage marketplace and digital asset management software. The company is headquartered in the USA.
