= 123RF =

Stock photography agency founded in 2005

- Type: Private
- Industry: Stock photography, stock footage, stock music
- Founded: 3 April 2005; 21 years ago
- Founder: Andy Sitt, Stephanie Sitt
- Fate: Active
- Headquarters: Selangor, Malaysia
- Number of employees: 350 (2015)
- Parent: Inmagine Group
- Website: www.123rf.com

123RF is a company that sells stock photography, stock footage, and stock music. The two co-founders are Andy Sitt and Stephanie Sitt, who is the current CEO.

== History ==
In 2000, 123RF Andy Sitt left his job at a British company that sold stock images in CDs while showing customers printed catalogs. He launched an e-commerce business by setting up Inmagine, selling large-format photo prints.

In 2005, Inmagine set up 123RF, which sells royalty-free stock images, videos, and audio clips. Unlike the previous business model, 123RF allows photographers to sell their work on the platform under a crowdsourcing model.

In 2011, Inmagine established a global presence with 44 regional offices worldwide. Offices were founded in North and Latin America, Europe, Asia, Africa, the Middle East, and Australasia.

In 2019, Inmagine reorganized its business into three main products: 123RF, Pixlr, and Designs.ai. The launching of Pixlr Market (now Stock by Pixlr) and Pixlr Editor commences.

In 2020, the company launched its first artificial intelligence platform, Inmagine Brain. In November 2020, the company confirmed that it had been subject to a data breach, with 8.3 million customer records available for sale on the dark web.

Through 123RF, Inmagine created a visual guide in 2021 to predict image search trends.

In June 2022, the company launched a free images section where audiences can download images with a limited amount of daily downloads.

In April 2026, 123RF launched Sphere, a platform described by the company as a "creative operating system" combining campaign planning, asset production, and publishing for marketing teams and agencies.

== Acquisitions ==
In March 2017, 123RF acquired TheHungryJPEG, a UK-registered font and graphics marketplace and its sister company Craftbundles for an undisclosed sum.

In April 2017, 123RF acquired Pixlr, an online web-based image editor from Autodesk for an undisclosed sum.

In November 2017, 123RF acquired Vectr, a web-based vector editor and Story & Heart, a video education platform.
