= Bruce Livingstone =

Canadian entrepreneur

Bruce Livingstone is a Canadian entrepreneur who founded Calgary-based iStockphoto, an online distributor of stock photography.

Livingstone started iStockphoto in 2000 as a project offering stock photos for free over the internet. In 2002, high monthly bandwidth bills prodded him to implement a payment/credit system. In 2006, Livingstone sold iStockphoto to Getty Images for $50 million, where he continued on as iStockphoto's CEO. Livingstone picked up additional roles at Getty (including SVP Consumer) but left Getty and iStockphoto in 2009.

In 2010, he became CEO of Saatchi Online, an internet-based art community, and later resigned his position in 2012.

In 2013, unhappy with the direction of iStock under Getty (and following the expiration of his non-compete agreement) Livingston founded Stocksy United, a royalty-free stock photo and video agency based in Victoria, BC.
