= Microstock photography =

Part of the stock photography industry

Microstock photography is a part of the stock photography industry. What defines a company as a microstock photography company is that they source their images almost exclusively via the Internet, do so from a wider range of photographers than the traditional stock agencies (including a willingness to accept images from amateur photographers and hobbyists), and sell their images at a very low rate (from $0.20 - $10 USD) for a royalty-free (RF) image.

A number of microstock sites also sell vector art, and some sell audio (music) files, Flash animations and video as well as images.

== History ==
The pioneer of microstock photography was Bruce Livingstone, who created iStockphoto (later renamed iStock), originally a free stock photo site that quickly became an industry phenomenon. Livingstone sold iStockphoto to Getty Images in February 2006 for US$50 million. Many other sites sprang up in the years after iStockphoto's inception.

After a few years of initial growth, the microstock industry began a period of mergers and acquisitions. The acquisition of iStockphoto by Getty Images in 2006 was followed by acquisition of StockXpert by Jupiterimages during 2006. Subsequently, Jupiterimages, a wholly owned subsidiary of Jupitermedia, was bought by Getty Images in 2009 for $96 million in cash and resulted in the closure of StockXpert in 2010 because it was perceived to be non-strategic for Getty Imagesa compared to iStockphoto. After the sale, Jupitermedia changed its name to WebMediaBrands. BigStockPhoto was purchased by Shutterstock in 2009.

Starting from limited RF license, all agencies added various Extended Licenses; sites based on a "pay-per-download" principle introduced subscription and vice versa. Shutterstock, which was the only 100% subscription-based microstock agency, introduced a pay-per-download scheme and later acquired BigStockPhoto to extend their presence in pay-per-download niche. Newcomer Cutcaster.com extended the pricing model by introducing a model where contributors could set their start price or could choose to use a pricing algorithm and they allowed a buyer to pay the price shown or bid on the content and name their price. Microstock prices were significantly adjusted several times by the respective agencies in the last three years across multiple sites. Many microstock agencies started to sell video in addition to static pictures, and some started to sell sound clips.

In 2012, Shutterstock became the first microstock agency to complete an initial public offering. The agency now trades on the New York Stock Exchange under the ticker SSTK.

In December 2014 Adobe acquired Fotolia for US$800 million in cash.

== Practices and controversy ==
Each microstock agency uses a different pricing and payment scheme. In some instances the same photo can have several prices. Photographers can upload the same pictures on multiple sites or, with some agencies, become an exclusive supplier and receive an increased commission and additional benefits.

There is no fee to post photos on a microstock agency website. However, microstock agencies do not accept all submitters or all photographs. Each employs a team of reviewers who check every picture submitted for legal issues and technical quality, as well as artistic and commercial merit. Photographers add keywords that help potential buyers filter and find pictures of interest.

Some professional photographers who do not participate believe that microstock devalues the practice of photography, and that the business model is unsustainable. They see the growth of microstock sites as reducing their own incomes.
