= IStock =

Microstock photography website

iStock by Getty Images
- Formerly: iStockphoto (until 2013)
- Type: Subsidiary
- Genre: Microstock photography
- Founded: May 14, 2000; 26 years ago (as iStockphoto)
- Founder: Bruce Livingstone
- Headquarters: Calgary, Alberta, Canada
- Parent: Getty Images
- Website: www.istockphoto.com

iStock is an online royalty free, international microstock photography provider based in Calgary, Alberta, Canada.

== History ==
The company was founded by Bruce Livingstone in May 2000, as iStockphoto, a free stock imagery website supported by Livingstone's web development firm, Evolvs Media. iStock pioneered the crowd-sourced stock industry and became the original source for user-generated stock photos, vectors and illustrations, and video clips. It began charging money in 2001 and quickly became profitable.

On February 9, 2006, the firm was acquired by Getty Images for US$50 million. Livingstone promised that the site would continue "functioning independently with the benefits of Getty Images, yet, very importantly for them and us, autonomy."

On September 18, 2006, the site experienced the first benefits of the new ownership: a controlled-vocabulary keyword taxonomy borrowed from Getty Images.

iStockpro was a more expensive version of iStockphoto that was never as popular. It closed in 2007, having become redundant after the acquisition by Getty Images.

On April 1, 2008, Getty Images disclosed, as part of its agreement to be sold to a private equity firm, that iStockphoto's revenue in 2007 was US$71.9 million of which US$20.9 million (29%) was paid to contributors.

Founder and CEO Livingstone left iStockphoto in 2009. He went on to co-found competitor Stocksy United in 2013.

In 2013, iStockphoto was rebranded as iStock by Getty Images, removing the word 'photo' to convey that the company offers stock media other than just photography, such as vector illustrations, audio, and video.

In 2020, iStock began offering weekly complimentary stock photos from its exclusive Signature collection, as well as monthly free illustrations and video clips.

In October 2026, parent company Getty Images announced that it would be going private as part of a restructuring deal with Koch, Inc., which will invest $533 million in the company. As part of the deal, Getty Images announced to its intention to file for prepackaged Chapter 11 bankruptcy protection within the coming weeks, which it did on October 21, 2026.

== Contributors ==
iStock works with over 300,000 contributors globally, thousands of which are exclusive and create content solely for the platform. Contributing photographers apply by uploading 3–6 sample images, illustrations, or videos to the Contributor by Getty Images app, which is available on App Store and Google Play. The content is reviewed, and if successful, applicants are invited to become either a Getty Images or iStock contributor.

Contributors receive royalties each time their content is licensed. Royalty rates start at 15% for photos and 20% for illustrations and videos, with exclusive contributors earning between 25% and 45%.

In an address to its community entitled "2008: A Year in Review and a Look Ahead″, the firm's CEO mentioned that the company was paying out 'almost' $1.1 million per week in royalty payments to contributors.

== Ownership of material controversy ==
This background of a movie poster for the 2011 film The Roommate was provided by iStockphoto. The image is that of the Christy Administration building at Southwestern College. The college believes this image was used without their permission.

The 2011 film The Roommate obtained photos from iStockPhoto for its promotional material. One of the photos used as its backdrop was the Christy Administration Building from Southwestern College in Winfield, Kansas. The college administration voiced concern that permission to use the photograph of the building was not properly obtained and is investigating the legality of its use. As of February 8, 2011, no lawsuits have been filed but discussions continue to take place.

== iStockvideo ==
On July 31, 2006, iStockphoto announced the development of a new branch, iStockvideo, to sell stock video clips in a variety of formats from web-size, through NTSC and PAL up to HDV and HD sizes.

== iStockalypse event ==
The iStockalypse was founded in 2005, as an official multi-day iStock photography event offering premium training. It is held several times a year for contributing artists and photographers.

Since the first event in Las Vegas, iStock has visited Seattle, Boston, Ljubljana, Prague, Austin, Barcelona, Marseille, Buenos Aires, Malta, Berlin, Calgary, Istanbul, Cannes, Tokyo, London, Milan, Singapore, São Paulo, Los Angeles and Paris. In March 2015, the event was organized in Dubai to get authentic, local shots of the city and its people.
