= Rights Managed =

Type of copyright license

Rights Managed, or RM, in photography and the stock photo industry, refers to a copyright license which, if purchased by a user, allows the one-time use of the photo as specified by the license. If the user wants to use the photo for other uses an additional license needs to be purchased. RM licences can be given on a non-exclusive or exclusive basis. In stock photography RM is one of the two common license types together with royalty-free, subscription and microstock photography being business models often confused as separate license types (both use the royalty-free license type).
