= Stock photography =

Photographs with a specific use

A stock photo of a businesswoman looking at her watch

Stock photography is the supply of photographs that are often licensed for specific uses. The stock photo industry, which began to gain hold in the 1920s, has established models including traditional macrostock photography, midstock photography, and microstock photography. Conventional stock agencies charge from several hundred to several thousand US dollars per image, while microstock photography may sell for around US$0.25. Professional stock photographers traditionally place their images with one or more stock agencies on a contractual basis, while stock agencies may accept the high-quality photos of amateur photographers through online submission.

Themes for stock photos are diverse, although Megan Garber of The Atlantic wrote in 2012 that "one of the more wacky/wondrous elements of stock photos is the manner in which, as a genre, they've developed a unifying editorial sensibility. To see a stock image is... to know you're seeing a stock image." Historically notable traditional stock photo agencies have included RobertStock, the Bettman Archive in New York, and the Hulton Archive in the United Kingdom, among many others. In the 1990s companies such as Photodisc in Seattle, Washington, began selling CD ROMs with packs of images, pioneering the royalty-free licensing system at a time when Rights Managed licensing was the norm in the stock industry. There was a great amount of consolidation among stock photo agencies between 1990 and the mid-2000s, particularly through Corbis and Getty Images. The early microstock company iStockphoto was founded in May 2000, followed by companies such as Dreamstime, 123RF, Shutterstock, DepositPhotos and Adobe Stock.

== History ==
=== First stock photo companies (1920–1930s) ===
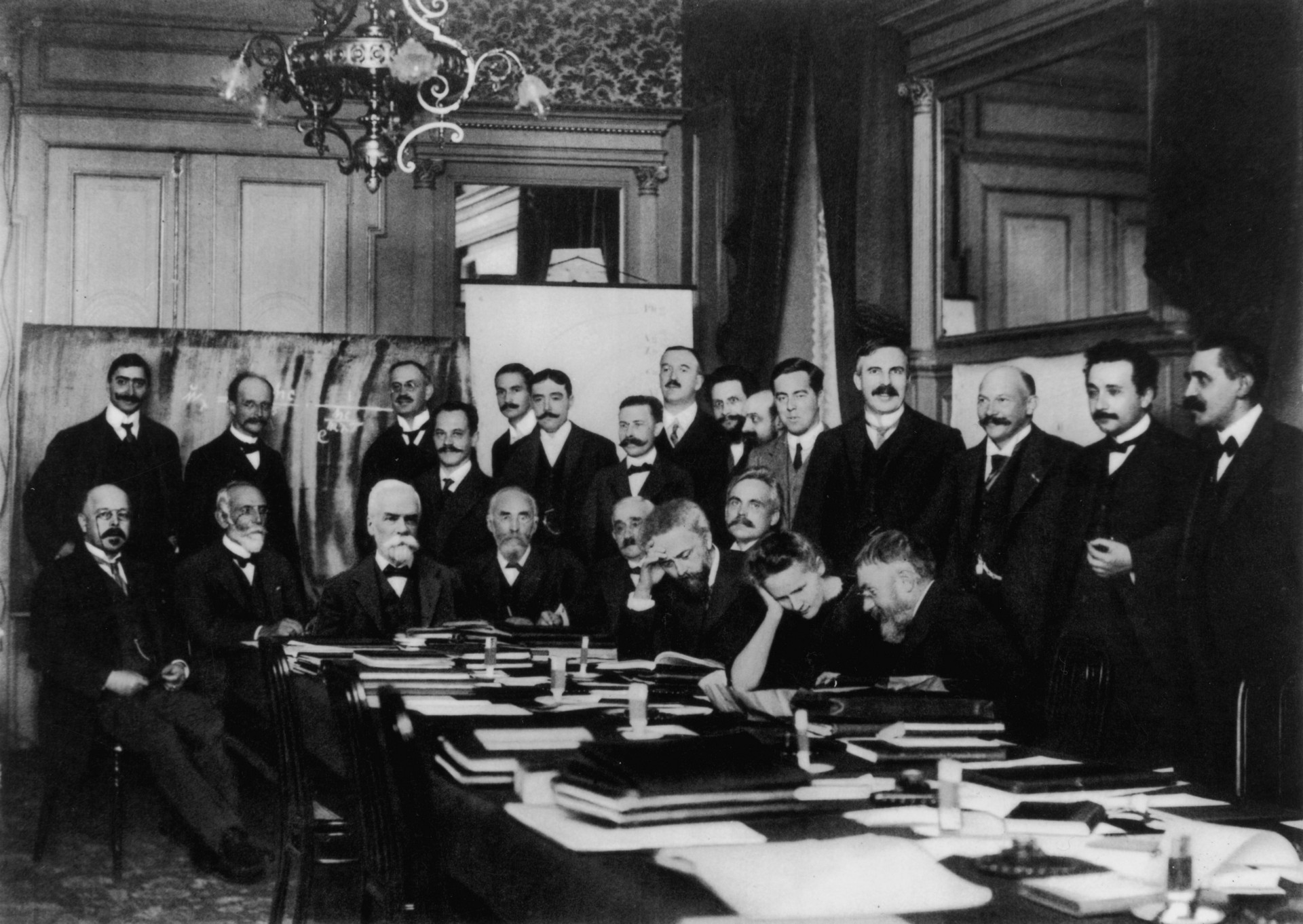
A stock photograph, now in the archive of Getty Images, showing the 1911 Solvay Conference in Belgium. Many stock photos document historical events.

Newspapers and magazines were first able to reproduce photographs instead of line art in the mid-1880s with the invention of the half-tone and its use on a printing press. Initially starting with staff photographers, independent free-lance photographers eventually took over. One of the first examples of a stock photo was circa 1920 when American photographer H. Armstrong Roberts ensured that the people photographed in "Group in Front of Tri-Motor Airplane" all signed model releases. This allowed the photograph and others like it to be commercially viable. In an effort to save the cost of hiring photographers for commission-based photo shoots, publishers and advertisers began to consider stock photos as a less risky alternative. One of the first major stock photography libraries was founded in 1920 by H. Armstrong Roberts.

The Bettmann Archive in New York is an example of an early traditional stock agency, with the company delivering photos upon 24-hour request to magazines such as Look and Life. Founded in 1936 by Otto Bettmann, a German curator who emigrated to the United States in 1935, the Bettman Archive began with Bettmann's personal collection of 15,000 images which he brought with him in suitcases when he escaped from Nazi Germany. He actively expanded his collection by placing ads in magazines for stills and photos. A different early pioneer with the stock industry was photographer Tony Stone, whose portfolio of mountain scenes proved popular with chocolate advertisers. Stone's stock library eventually reached 20,000 images, each selected for its likelihood to sell multiple copies.

=== New indexing systems and growth (1940s–1980s) ===
Known as a stock resource for newspapers and magazines, the Hulton Archive started as the photographic archive of Picture Post. As the archive expanded through World War II, it became clear that its vast collection of photographs and negatives were becoming an important historical documentary resource. In 1945, Sir Edward Hulton set up the Hulton Press Library as a semi-independent operation and commissioned Charles Gibbs-Smith of the Victoria and Albert Museum to catalogue the entire archive using a system of keywords and classifications. The Gibbs-Smith system claims to be the world's first indexing system for pictures, and it was eventually adopted by the British Museum collections.

=== Expansion and transition online (1980s–1990s) ===
By the 1980s, stock photography had become a specialty in its own right, with the stock industry advancing quickly. As photo libraries transitioned from physical archives to servers in the mid-1990s, "stock libraries" were increasingly called "stock agencies". The archives also began to rely increasingly on keywords for sorting and retrieving photographs. In 1991, Photodisc in Seattle, Washington, began selling CD ROMs with packs of images. Unlike their competitors, Photodisc licensed the image packs as Royalty Free. In contrast to the Rights Managed system, royalty free allowed the purchaser of a CD ROM to use the images as many times as they liked without paying further fees.

There was a great amount of consolidation among stock photo agencies between 1990 and the mid-2000s, with Corbis notably acquiring the massive Bettmann Archive in 1995. After Photodisc went online in 1995, in September 1997, PhotoDisc agreed to combine with London-based Getty Communications to form the Seattle-based Getty Images. In 1996, the Hulton Picture Collection was bought by Getty Images for £8.6 million.

Alamy (registered as Alamy Limited) is a privately owned stock photography agency launched in 1999. Alamy maintains an online archive of over one hundred million still images, illustrations and hundreds of thousands of videos contributed by agencies and independent photographers or collected from news archives, museums and national collections. Its suppliers include both professional and amateur photographers, stock agencies, news archives, museums and national collections. Its clients are from the photography, publishing and advertising industries and the general public.

=== Recent developments (2000–present) ===
The early microstock company iStockphoto was founded in May 2000. Originally a free stock imagery website, it transitioned into its current micropayment model in 2001. iStockphoto co-founders Bruce Livingstone and Brianna Wettlaufer then went on to start Stocksy United in 2013. Helping pioneer the subscription-based model of stock photography, Shutterstock was founded in 2003 with a monthly subscription fee. Online since 2000 as a royalty-free stock photography website, in 2004 Dreamstime was founded as new microstock agency. Other stock agencies with new business models around this time included fotoLibra, which opened to the public in 2005, and Can Stock Photo, which debuted in 2004. By 2007 Dreamstime was competing with iStockphoto, Fotolia and Shutterstock, all expanded into major microstock companies. In March 2013 microstock company Depositphotos launched Clashot, a service that allows smartphone users to instantly upload photos to the photobank from their devices, followed by Fotolia, that launched the very similar Fotolia Instant later that year.

Between the 1990s and the mid-2000s, Bill Gates' Corbis Images and Getty Images combined purchased more than 40 stock photo agencies. iStockphoto, or iStock.com, was acquired by Getty in 2006. In February 2009, Jupitermedia Corporation sold their online stock images division, Jupiterimages, to Getty Images for $96 million in cash, including the sites stock.xchng and StockXpert. In 2005, Scoopt started a photo news agency for citizen journalism enabling the public to upload and sell breaking news images taken with cameraphones. In 2007 Scoopt was purchased by Getty Images, which closed it in 2009. In 2012 Shutterstock became the first microstock agency to complete an initial public offering, with the company's shares reaching a $2.5 billion market value by late 2013.

==== Artificial intelligence ====
The rapid commercialization of generative AI beginning in the 2020s has had a significant impact on the stock photography industry. Critics in the photography press argued early on that image synthesis was particularly suited to replacing the generic, broadly-keyworded imagery that dominates stock catalogs, with photographer Grant Scott writing in 2023 that stock photography had been in decline since the late 1990s and that AI could "ring the final toll" for generic stock work, while authorial and commissioned photography requiring "a living breathing photographer" would remain commercially viable. The Wall Street Journal subsequently characterized the period as an existential moment for veteran contributors, as agencies including Getty Images and Shutterstock integrated AI-generated imagery alongside their traditional libraries.

Adobe Stock, which began accepting AI-generated submissions in December 2022, saw the share of AI imagery in its catalog rise from approximately 2.5% in May 2023 to 48% by April 8, 2025—roughly 313 million AI images compared with 342 million conventional photographs—with more than 29 million new AI images uploaded each month during the first quarter of 2025, a pace that prompted Adobe to begin enforcing per-contributor upload limits in May 2025. In November 2024 Adobe rolled out generative editing features such as Generative Edits and Generate Variations, allowing customers to modify licensed assets in real time using Adobe Firefly. Under Adobe's contributor model, photographers are compensated only when a generated output derived from their image is downloaded, or through periodic Firefly training bonuses for content used to train the model—policies that The Phoblographer and other outlets criticized for shifting risk onto human contributors and increasing rejection rates for traditional submissions citing duplicate content.

By 2025, Axios reported that AI tools were also displacing entry-level work such as professional headshots and food imagery—citing claims by services like Profile Bakery that 92% of viewers could not distinguish AI headshots from photographs—while major brands continued to commission established photographers for higher-end campaigns.

== Description ==
Stock photography refers to the supply of photographs, which are often licensed for specific uses such as magazine publishing or pamphlet-making. According to The New York Times, as of 2005 "most" book cover designers prefer stock photography agencies over photographers in efforts to save costs. Publishers can then purchase photographs on an exclusive or non-exclusive basis.

Established models of stock photography include:

1. Macrostock: High-priced and exclusive stock photography, also known as traditional stock photography
2. Midstock: Stock photography priced between micro stock and macro stock, which is often used online
3. Microstock: Low-priced and inclusive stock photography. In competition to traditional agencies, microstock photography is a relatively new model of stock photography which is available through agencies that sell images for lower prices but in greater volume.

According to The New York Times, conventional stock agencies charge from several hundred to several thousand American dollars per image, and "base fees on the published size of an image, circulation and other factors." Microstock photos may sell for as little as US$0.25. Professional stock photographers traditionally place their images with one or more stock agencies on a contractual basis, with a defined commission basis and specified contract term. The industry standard is purportedly 30 to 50 percent to the photographer, although at the start of the stock photography industry, fees were typically cut half and half between the agency and artist. Other stock agencies may accept the high-quality photos of amateur photographers through online submission.

Some online photo websites have created unique software to search for fitting stock photos, for example searching for complicated keyword combinations, color, shapes, and "moods". Other search engines may seek to quantify the best photos by looking for elements as diverse as "bright lights", "evidence of emotional connections between people", and the tilt of faces.

=== Styles and trends ===
Traditional stock photo agencies have large catalogues that may include press archives and works by notable photographers such as Bert Hardy, Bill Brandt, Weegee and Ernst Haas. More recent trends in microstock photography include "lifestyle" photographs of people "at work and play", food, sports, and fashion. Other stock photo themes may include stereotypes, expressing common emotions and gesticulations, pets, and images related to travel and tourism.

In the early 1990s, the stock industry focused on "conceptual images", which could encapsulate themes such as "global communication, success, and teamwork". After the consolidation of many stock photo agencies in the 1990s and early 2000s, new companies began focusing on "niche collections" including "medical, science, minorities, gay and lesbian lifestyles, aviation, maps, panoramas, historical, sports, and celebrity homes". Opined Megan Garber of The Atlantic in 2012, "one of the more wacky/wondrous elements of stock photos is the manner in which, as a genre, they've developed a unifying editorial sensibility. To see a stock image is, Potter Stewart-style, to know you're seeing a stock image. And while stock images' stockiness may be in part due to the common visual tropes that give them their easy, cheesy impact - prettiness, preciousness, pose-iness - there's part of it that's more ephemeral, too. Though they have little in common, shots of a German Shepherd typing on a laptop and a man contemplating the sunset can both be, in their special way, stocky."

== Types of stock photo licenses ==
=== Public domain (PD) ===
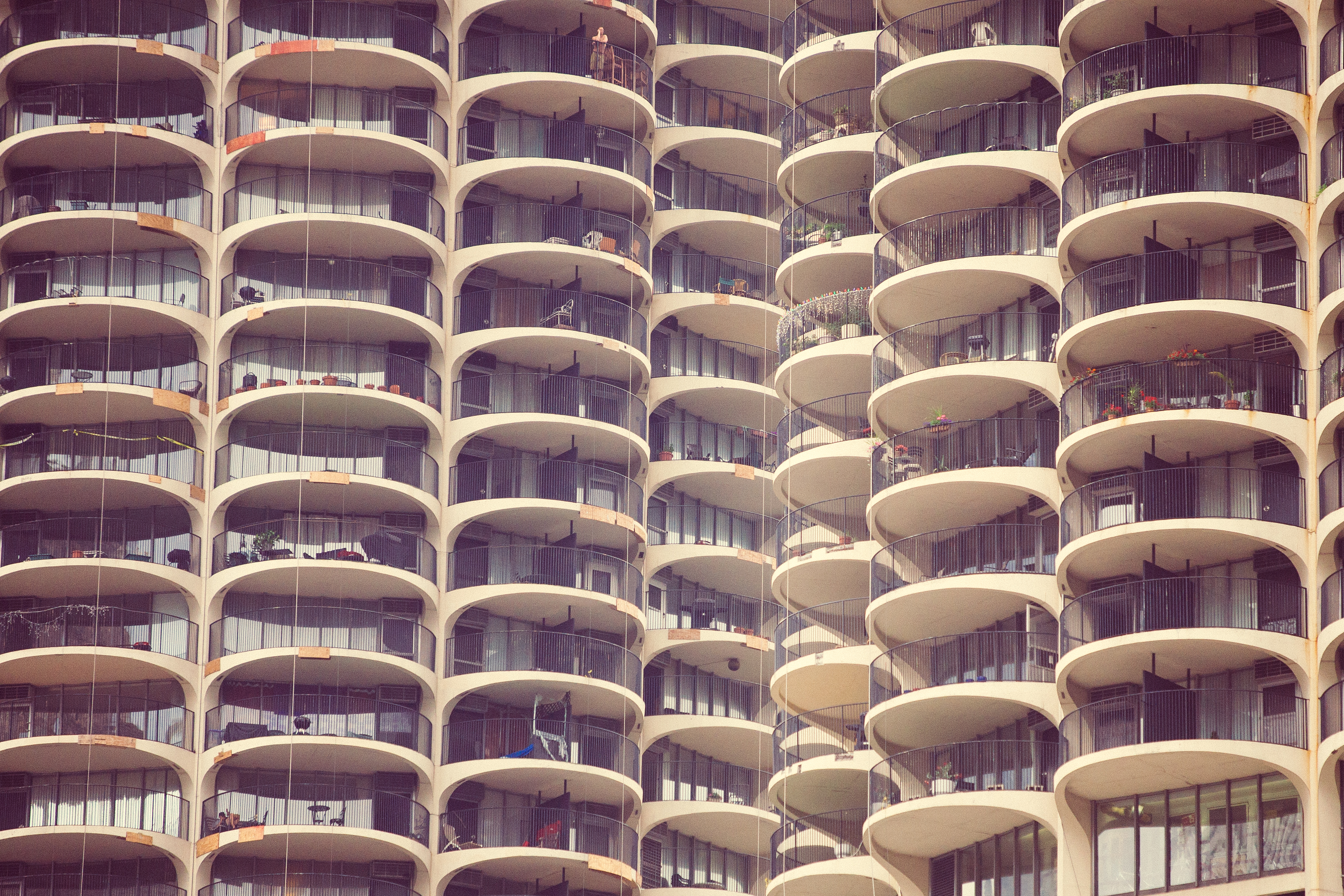
Example of a public domain stock photo, showing the Marina City building complex in Chicago

In relation to photography and graphics, public domain (PD) means the image is free to use without purchasing a license, and can be used for commercial or personal purposes. Works in the public domain are those whose exclusive intellectual property rights have expired, have been forfeited, or are inapplicable.

=== Royalty-free (RF) ===
In photography and the illustration industry, royalty-free (RF) refers to a copyright license where the user has the right to use the picture without many restrictions based on one-time payment to the licensor. The user can, therefore, use the image in several projects without having to purchase any additional licenses. RF licenses cannot be given on an exclusive basis. In stock photography, RF is one of the common licenses sometimes contrasted with Rights Managed licenses and often employed in subscription-based or microstock photography business models.

=== Rights-managed (RM) ===
Rights Managed (RM) in the stock photo industry (sometimes called "licensed images") refers to a copyright license that, if purchased by a user, allows the one-time use of the photo as specified by the license. If the user wants to use the photo for other uses an additional license needs to be purchased. RM licenses can be given on a nonexclusive or exclusive basis. In stock photography RM is one of the two common license types together with royalty-free, subscription, and microstock photography being business models often confused as separate license types (both use the royalty-free license type).

== See also ==
- List of online image archives
- Microstock photography
- Stock footage
- Representative image
