= Royalty-free =

Type of copyright licence with no royalties or per-use fees

Royalty-free (RF) material subject to copyright or other intellectual property rights may be used without the need to pay royalties or license fees for each use, per each copy or volume sold or some time period of use or sales.

== Computer standards ==
Many computer industry standards, especially those developed and submitted by industry consortiums or individual companies, involve royalties for the actual implementation of these standards. These royalties are typically charged on a "per port"/"per device" basis, where the manufacturer of end-user devices has to pay a small fixed fee for each device sold, and also include a substantial annual fixed fee. With millions of devices sold each year, the royalties can amount to several millions of dollars, which is a significant burden for the manufacturer. Examples of such royalties-based standards include IEEE 1394, HDMI, and H.264/MPEG-4 AVC.

Royalty-free standards do not include any "per-port" or "per-volume" charges or annual payments for the actual implementation of the standard, even though the text of the actual specification is typically protected by copyright and needs to be purchased from the standards body. Most open standards are royalty-free, and many proprietary standards are royalty-free as well. Examples of royalty-free standards include DisplayPort, VGA, VP8, and Matroska.

== Photography and illustrations ==
In photography and the illustration industry, it refers to a copyright license where the user has the right to use the picture without many restrictions to the licensor. The user can therefore use the image in several projects without having to purchase any additional licenses. RF licenses can not be given on an exclusive basis. In stock photography, RF is one of the common licenses sometimes contrasted with Rights Managed licenses and often employed in subscription-based or microstock photography business models. When something has a royalty-free descriptor, that does not mean it is free. Copyrighted work is protected from use by others without formal permission and royalty payments. Royalties are a percentage of earnings that are paid to an intellectual property owner/ content creator.

== Licensing of AI-generated images ==
The licensing (and/or copyrighting) of AI-generated images is not legally recognized yet. Most jurisdictions, including Spain and Germany, state that only works created by a human can be protected by copyright. Since generative AI models derive their source material from a countless amount of human-generated content, it is not easy to define who owns what percentage of the rights to the results. However, larger stock agencies which offer AI stock images sell those AI images under royalty-free licenses.

== See also ==
- Open standard
- Royalty-free music
