= Gab (social network) =

American alt-tech social media service

Gab AI, Inc.
- Website type: Microblogging, social networking service
- Available in: English
- Founded: 2016
- Headquarters: 700 North State Street, Clarks Summit, Pennsylvania, U.S.
- Founders: Andrew Torba (CEO); Ekrem Büyükkaya (CTO)
- CEO: Andrew Torba
- Industry: Internet
- Services: Gab, Gab AI, Gab News, Gab TV, Gab Chat, Gab Ads, Gab Trends, GabPro, Dissenter (web browser), Dissenter (browser extension), Arya (chatbot)
- Website: gab.com
- Commercial: Yes
- Registration: Required to post
- Users: 100,000 (estimated active); 5 million (total) as of 2022
- Launched: August 15, 2016; 10 years ago (private beta); May 8, 2017; 9 years ago (open registration); July 4, 2019; 7 years ago (switch to customized Mastodon fork and relaunched)
- Current status: Active

Gab is an American alt-tech microblogging and social networking service. Widely described as a haven for far-right and alt-right users, Gab has attracted users and groups who have been banned from other social media platforms and users seeking alternatives to mainstream social media platforms. Founded in 2016 and launched publicly in May 2017, Gab claims to promote free speech, individual liberty, the "free flow of information online", and Christian values. Researchers and journalists have characterized these assertions as an obfuscation of its extremist ecosystem. Antisemitism is prominent in the site's content and the company itself has engaged in antisemitic commentary. Gab CEO Andrew Torba has promoted the white genocide conspiracy theory. Gab is based in Pennsylvania.

Researchers note that Gab has been linked to radicalization leading to real-world violent events. The site received extensive public scrutiny following the Pittsburgh synagogue shooting in October 2018. The perpetrator of the attack, Robert Gregory Bowers, had a history of making extreme, antisemitic postings on the platform, as well as messages indicating an immediate intent to cause harm before the shooting. After the shooting, Gab briefly went offline when it was dropped by its hosting provider and denied service by several payment processors. In 2021, Gab was among the platforms used to plan the United States Capitol attack on January 6. Also in 2021, Gab suffered from a data breach called "GabLeaks".

Gab's functionality is similar to that of Twitter (later X). Users of Gab can publish posts, initiate private chats, join groups, livestream and buy products. The company also maintains an email service, cloud service, text messaging service, advertisement sales system, server farm, marketplace website, news aggregation website, advertising platform, video-conferencing platform, blog, video hosting, web browser, and browser extension to allow commenting on third-party websites. In July 2019, Gab switched its software infrastructure to a fork of Mastodon, a free and open-source social network platform. Mastodon released a statement in protest, denouncing Gab as trying to "monetize and platform racist content while hiding behind the banner of free speech".

== History ==
=== 2016–2018 ===
Gab was founded in 2016 by chief executive officer (CEO) Andrew Torba and chief technology officer (CTO) Ekrem Büyükkaya, who had previously worked together at advertising technology company Automate Ads (formerly Kuhcoon). Torba started working on the site in May 2016 and on August 15, 2016, Gab launched in private beta, billing itself as a "free speech" alternative to social networking sites Twitter and Facebook. Torba has cited "the entirely left-leaning Big Social monopoly", "social justice bullying", "the rise of online censorship during the 2016 election." and an alleged bias against conservative articles by Facebook as his reasons for creating Gab. Gab AI, Inc. was incorporated on September 9, 2016. Utsav Sanduja later joined Gab as chief operating officer (COO).

Torba said in November 2016 that the site's user base had expanded significantly following censorship controversies involving major social media companies, including the permanent suspensions of several prominent alt-right accounts from Twitter after the 2016 U.S. presidential election. During November 2016, Gab gained 5,000 new users per week. By mid-December 2016, there were 200,000 people on Gab's waiting list. At the time, Torba claimed that Gab had about 130,000 registered users.

On May 8, 2017, Gab exited private beta.

During August and September 2017, immediately following the Unite The Right rally in Charlottesville, Gab experienced another increase in new users, gaining around 3,300 per week.

In early September 2017, Gab faced pressure from its domain registrar Asia Registry to take down a post by The Daily Stormer founder Andrew Anglin, giving Gab 48 hours to do so. Gab later removed the post. Danny O'Brien of the Electronic Frontier Foundation commented that this pressure was part of an increase in politically motivated domain name seizures.

On August 9, 2018, Torba announced that Microsoft Azure, Gab's host, had threatened to suspend the site for "weeks/months" if they failed to remove two antisemitic posts made by Patrick Little, a U.S. Senate candidate who had been ejected from the Republican Party for his antisemitism. According to The Verge, the posts "express intense anti-Semitism and meet any reasonable definition of hate speech". Little said in the posts that Jews should be raised as "livestock" and that he intended to destroy a "holohoax memorial". In response to Azure's threat, Little posted on Gab that "I'll delete the posts, but this is a violation of our rights as Americans". Gab's Twitter account also asserted that Little had self-deleted the posts, but this was contradicted by Torba who said Gab itself had deleted the posts which "unquestionably" broke their "user guidelines". On the same day, Alex Jones interviewed Torba on The Alex Jones Show during his coverage of his own permanent ban from YouTube. Little was suspended indefinitely from Gab in late November 2018 for encouraging harassment of private individuals; Gab claimed that although Little's account had posted hate speech, it was not the cause of the ban.

According to Gab's filings with the SEC, around 635,000 users were registered on Gab by September 10, 2018. On September 12, 2018, Gab purchased the Gab.com domain name from Sedo for $220,000 (~$277,403 in 2025) on Flippa, an online business marketplace; it had previously been using the domain Gab.ai.

During the 2018 Brazilian presidential election from September to October 2018, many right-wing Brazilian political pages were banned from Facebook for breaching the site's hate speech rules. In response, many administrators of these pages began promoting Gab as an alternative platform; subsequently, Brazilians became the second-largest demographic of Gab users. Jair Bolsonaro's party, the Social Liberal Party, had an official Gab account.

In December 2018, Gab sponsored Turning Point USA's 2018 "Student Action Summit" in Palm Beach, Florida. Days before the event, Turning Point USA removed Gab from the list of sponsors without explanation. Gab later posted a press release protesting the unexplained removal.

==== 2018 Pittsburgh synagogue shooting ====
Robert Gregory Bowers, the shooter in the attack against a Pittsburgh synagogue on October 27, 2018, maintained an active, verified Gab account where he displayed the neo-Nazi code-phrase "1488" and a bio that said, "jews are the children of satan". Just prior to the shooting, he used this account to post "HIAS likes to bring invaders in that kill our people. I can't sit by and watch my people get slaughtered. Screw your optics, I'm going in".

After Bowers was arrested, Gab suspended his profile, gathered all user data for the account, and contacted the Federal Bureau of Investigation (FBI). On October 27, 2018, the day of the shooting, PayPal, GoDaddy, and Medium terminated their relationship with Gab, and PayPal released a statement that it had it done so based on its review of accounts that may engage in the "perpetuation of hate, violence or discriminatory intolerance". Later on the same day, Gab announced on Twitter that Joyent, Gab's hosting provider, would terminate their service on October 29 at 9:00 am ET. The tweet said that the site expected to be down for weeks. Stripe and Backblaze also terminated their services with Gab after the shooting. On October 29, Gab claimed in a tweet that they "took the site down early on purpose last night because we knew the media would take the bait and have stories on it for this morning".

Following the shooting, Gab received substantial media attention, having been relatively unknown by the general public prior to the attack. The New Republic noted that prior to the shooting: "Despite some attention in the mainstream tech press, Gab was essentially considered a sideshow, an also-ran in the social media wars, destined to fade away like Yo, Ello, or other mostly forgotten platforms that could never hope to compete with Silicon Valley monopolies".

Gab had defended itself from criticism as a result of the shooting, saying that they: "refuse to be defined by the media's narratives about Gab and our community. Gab's mission is very simple: to defend free expression and individual liberty online for all people. Social media often brings out the best and the worst of humanity". Torba called the shooting "a clear act of terror", adding that he "fundamentally believed in freedom of expression", but did not tolerate threats of violence. Torba also said that "I do think that more speech is always going to be the answer to combat bad speech or hate speech".

Ekrem Büyükkaya, Gab's co-founder and CTO, announced his resignation on October 28, citing "attacks from the American press" that "have taken a toll on me personally".

After the site was taken down, Gab's homepage was changed to a message saying it was down due to being "under attack" and being "systematically no-platformed", adding that Gab would be inaccessible for a "period of time". Also after the site was taken down, Torba accused the media of demonizing Gab while ignoring similar problems on mainstream social networks, such as Facebook and Twitter.

Gab returned online on November 4, 2018, after Epik agreed to register the domain. Rob Monster, the CEO of Epik, had defended Gab's neo-Nazi users and also baselessly claimed that neo-Nazis on Gab are "liberal trolls" looking to "give enemies of freedom an excuse". On Gab, Christopher Cantwell replied to Monster's claims, stating: "We're not liberals, nor are the people trying to get us censored. The people trying to censor Gab are (((communists))), and the Nazis are the only ones willing to take them on ... Eventually, everyone will have to pick a side". The use of triple parentheses, according to the HuffPost, was code to label the people he referred to as Jews. Monster also said of Gab that "I do believe the guys that are on the site are vigilant".

After Gab returned online, the site was immediately flooded with antisemitic posts and comments, including one comment in response to a post from Torba welcoming back users of Gab and asking users to be nice to each other that said "Fuck that, name the Jews who are trying to shut us down". The comment was later deleted. In response to these posts and comments, Torba claimed that "a lot of people are creating brand new accounts and breaking our guidelines on purpose tonight". Torba also called on users of Gab to help police the site for posts that break Gab's user guidelines, including threats of violence.

=== 2019 ===
Gab turned to cryptocurrency payment processing services after being rejected from PayPal and Stripe in the aftermath of the 2018 Pittsburgh synagogue shooting. In January 2019, Coinbase and Square, Inc.'s Cash App closed the accounts held by Gab and Andrew Torba. On January 22, 2019, Gab announced that it had partnered with Second Amendment Processing (SAP), a Michigan-based payment processor. Gab removed SAP's credit card payment functionalities in March 2019, only accepting payment via cryptocurrency or check. The same month, the Southern Poverty Law Center (SPLC) published an investigation that found that SAP's founder had been convicted of financial crimes in 2007. Gab has not said why it removed the payment processor.

On January 24, 2019, the SPLC reported that Gab had been misrepresenting its services and bloating its user count in its filings and promotional materials. The GabTV service advertised on its StartEngine crowdfunding page as of January 2019 was only active very briefly in early 2018, and also as of January 2019, the dedicated page for the service was blank. Unlike other social media companies, Gab did not publish the count of its active users in 2018 and only reported registered accounts. Social media intelligence company Storyful found 19,526 unique usernames had posted content during a seven-day period between January 9 and 16, 2019, far lower than Gab's claimed 850,000 registered users. Users of the site commonly mocked Torba for the site's emptiness, with some accusing him of inflating user numbers. In a December 2018 filing, the company reported that 5,000 users were paying for its subscription services.

Shortly after the SPLC published its January report on Gab's misleading statements and financial struggles, the site made its Twitter account private until January 30, 2019, and switched to an invitation-only mode for new user registrations on January 30. Gab stated that switching to an invitation-only mode was an experiment to improve user experience. Gab previously had intermittent service outages for a week. Gab said that the outages were caused by bot attacks and blamed state actors along with paid "activist bloggers". Torba shared a post from another user that suggested that the "deep state" was responsible. The Daily Beast opined that this was an attempt to further obfuscate its numbers in response to reports that it had inflated its user count.

As of January 2019, Gab paid Sibyl Systems Ltd. $1,175 (~$1,480 in 2025) a month for web hosting. On February 14, 2019, the SPLC reported that a software engineer for Sibyl Systems had rejected Gab's claim of having more than 835,000 users and estimated the count to be in the range of a few thousands to a few tens of thousands. Sibyl Systems called the report "categorically false", saying that the "employee claimed to leak information that she could not have had access to" and that the employee had been dismissed.

On July 4, Gab switched its software infrastructure to run on a forked version of Mastodon, a free and open-source decentralized social network platform. The change attempted to circumvent the rejection of Gab's mobile app from the Google Play Store and the Apple App Store, as Gab users gained access to the social network through third-party Mastodon apps that did not subsequently block Gab. Mastodon released a statement the same day denouncing Gab as "seek[ing] to monetize and platform racist content while hiding behind the banner of free speech" and "attempt[ing] to hijack our infrastructure", and said that they had "already taken steps to isolate Gab and keep hate speech off the fediverse". Mastodon stated that most Mastodon instances had blocked Gab's domains, preventing interactions between these instances and Gab, and that Tusky and Toot!, two popular Mastodon mobile apps, had already blacklisted Gab's domains and banned Gab users from using their app. Mastodon also stated that by paywalling features that are otherwise freely accessible in other instances, Gab "offer[s] users no incentive to choose their platform" and "puts itself at a disadvantage compared to any Mastodon instance".

According to SimilarWeb, Gab's website traffic grew almost 200% between January and July 2019, and unique visitors to the site increased 180%. In August 2019, Vice News reported that traffic to Gab's website and the rate of new users joining Gab had both significantly increased during the first half of 2019. Also in August 2019, Torba claimed that Gab had over 1 million registered users.

In October 2019, Gab launched Gab Trends, a news aggregate website described by KNTV as being similar to the Drudge Report. Gab Trends provides titles and short summaries of news articles and includes a comment section under each article.

In 2019, Gab launched a browser extension called Dissenter, an aggregation and discussion service which allowed Gab users to make non-moderated comments on any webpage including news articles, YouTube videos, and individual social media posts. Comments made using the Dissenter extension were outside of the webpage owner's control, and the extension could be used to comment on websites with no comment feature or where the comment sections were closed. Dissenter was criticized as an extension which "puts a far-right comments section on every site." The Dissenter extension was subsequently banned from the Google and Mozilla add-on stores for violating hate-speech policies. Following this removal, Gab created their own Dissenter browser, based on a fork of the Brave browser, which has since been discontinued.

=== 2020 ===
In early 2020, Gab launched Gab Chat in beta, an encrypted text messaging service described by Mashable as an alternative to Discord. In late June 2020, hackers leaked a May 26 law enforcement bulletin that was distributed by Distributed Denial of Secrets (DDoSecrets), a whistleblower site that publishes leaked documents. The bulletin was created by the Central Florida Intelligence Exchange Fusion Center, who speculated that Gab Chat's encryption and privacy features for private chatting, such as the service automatically deleting text messages after 30 days of them being sent, could entice white supremacists to use the platform instead of Discord, a platform on which white supremacist groups have been frequently infiltrated by anti-fascists. When reached for a comment by Mashable, Torba responded to the bulletin in an email saying "Encryption does not render law enforcement totally blind" and that "Encryption doesn't cause a user to simply disappear. It doesn't prevent a service provider from seeing who is using its service or when that person is using the service". Torba also deflected from the concern of white supremacists using Gab Chat, saying that law enforcement should instead focus on stopping child exploitation on mainstream text messaging services.

In April 2020, Gab said that it had over 1.1 million registered users and that their website was receiving 3.7 million monthly visitors globally.

In July 2020, Slate reported that after Gab was connected to the 2018 Pittsburgh shooting, "Gab never quite recovered". The service's popularity diminished following the attack and the site's subsequent downtime.

In September 2020, Torba wrote that "Gab isn't just building an alternative social network", "We're building an alternative internet".

On October 1, 2020, Reuters broke a story that people associated with the Russian Internet Research Agency, a group known for their interference in the 2016 presidential election, had been operating social media accounts on both mainstream and alt-tech platforms. One of the accounts, which was identified in an FBI probe as a "key asset in an alleged Russian disinformation campaign", had been spreading "familiar—and completely false" information including claims that mail-in voting is prone to fraud, that then-U.S. President Donald Trump was infected with COVID-19 by leftist activists, and that Democratic presidential candidate Joe Biden is a "sexual predator". Axios noted that the account had not found much of an audience on mainstream platforms but had caught on among the alt-tech platforms; the Twitter account had fewer than 200 followers, but the Gab account had 3,000 and the Parler account had 14,000. Facebook, Twitter, and LinkedIn all took actions to suspend the accounts from their platforms. The Washington Post reported on October 7 that Gab had declined to terminate the account after being informed of its connections to the disinformation organization. Torba said to Reuters: "It looks like a blog sharing news stories and opinions. It's irrelevant to us who runs it or why". Speaking to The Washington Post, Torba said: "They can speak freely on Gab just like anyone else".

During the 2020 U.S. presidential election in November, Gab claimed that they experienced record user growth.

In December 2020, Engineering & Technology reported that Gab and other similar platforms could face "huge fines" for spreading misinformation under a new online safety bill in the United Kingdom that was planning on being introduced in 2021.

In late 2020, Torba posted on Gab's blog that the company "Welcomes QAnon Across Its Platforms".

=== 2021 ===
==== Storming of the United States Capitol ====
Although early claims were made that Gab was among the platforms used to plan the storming of the United States Capitol on January 6, 2021, a later investigation by the FBI said it "found scant evidence that the January 6 attack on the U.S. Capitol was the result of an organized plot to overturn the presidential election result".

Posts about which streets to take in order to run from police, which tools to use to pry open doors, and carrying guns into the halls of Congress, were exchanged on Gab in advance of the storming. During the storming, users of Gab recorded entering offices of members of Congress, including the office of U.S. House Speaker Nancy Pelosi. Users of Gab also posted about searching for then-Vice President Mike Pence. Following the storming and then-President Trump's subsequent permanent suspension from Twitter, Torba said that Gab had experienced a 40% increase in traffic and that Gab was also gaining 10,000 new users per hour as of January 9. After Parler, another alt-tech social network, was pulled offline by its host Amazon Web Services on January 11, former users of that site started migrating to Gab. On January 14, Gab claimed on Twitter that the platform had gained 2.3 million new users in the past week. Gab's website experienced an 800% increase in traffic, which forced Torba to order emergency servers to handle the increase in traffic.

On January 12, ABC News reported that experts said that conservative-leaning social networks, including Gab, helped create echo chambers for extremist and violent views, which contributed to the Capitol storming.

After the Capitol storming, on January 13, the Anti-Defamation League (ADL) in an open letter to the United States Department of Justice called for a federal investigation into Gab and Torba to determine if they "intentionally aided" the individuals who were involved in the storming. The ADL cited posts from Torba telling users of Gab "heading to DC" to record "video footage in landscape mode" in anticipation of "communist violence" and also posted on Gab that it "would be a real shame if the people outside stormed the Senate".

In response, Torba denied he and his platform were responsible for the storming, saying that Gab did a "phenomenal job" of mitigating violent content. He also stated that Gab had been removing offending posts and reporting them to federal law enforcement leading up to the storming, saying that "Public safety is our top priority", but declined to say which law enforcement agency they were working with, citing an "ongoing investigation". Torba also deflected attention away from Gab and towards Facebook, saying that the storming was "organized using Facebook's technology, not Gab's". Torba signed off on his response to the ADL by saying that "We will never bend to their demands and we will never censor legal, 1A-protected speech that hurts the ADL's feelings. Ever" and that "Jesus is King."

ADL CEO Jonathan Greenblatt said in response: "It's ironic that, when called out for enabling extremist rhetoric, Gab's response is to craft" a letter "containing thinly veiled antisemitism", adding that "As our open letter makes clear, Gab is not moderating this extremist content, and their CEO seems to be encouraging users to upload it".

==== Subsequent events ====
On January 19, Rachel E. Greenspan from Business Insider observed that Gab had tweeted a direct quote from a post by Q, the anonymous individual or group whose messages form the basis of the far-right QAnon conspiracy theory. The tweet was later deleted. She also noted that Gab's Twitter account had posted multiple tweets referencing Jesus, including one tweet posted on January 18 featuring an image of Jesus walking with Pepe the Frog, a cartoon character used by the alt-right.

On February 9, Matt Field from the Bulletin of the Atomic Scientists reported that RT, a media outlet owned by the Russian government that Field claims helped Trump win the 2016 presidential election, had created an account on Gab right before the start of Trump's second impeachment trial. Field noted that RT had posted several articles on their Gab account, including one article criticizing The Lincoln Project, an organization run by anti-Trump Republicans.

On August 27, the U.S. House of Representatives select committee investigating the storming of the Capitol demanded records from Gab (alongside 14 other social media companies) going back to the spring of 2020. On September 1, Torba responded by refusing to cooperate with the investigation, saying that Gab does not track misinformation or disinformation, has no retention policies, keeps no records of internal discussion about concerns of an insurrection, and has no way of knowing that an account is run by a foreign government. Torba and Gab also refused to hand over private user communications to the select committee (communications that Gab has already shared with law enforcement), arguing that the U.S. Congress would need a subpoena or warrant under the Stored Communications Act (SCA). Also in September 2021, Whitney Kimball of Gizmodo noted that Gab "might not even agree that an insurrection happened at all", noting an email from the company titled "New Video From Jan 6th Destroys 'Insurrection' Hoax".

In late September, the Federal Office of Justice in Bonn, Germany imposed a fine of €30,000 on Gab for not naming a contact person for questions about the deletion of criminal content, despite a provision from the Network Enforcement Act. Gab has objected to the fine. In a blog post, Torba accused the German authorities of having no intention of removing criminal content and did not mention that the fine was imposed for not naming a contact person. Torba also asked for financial support to combat the fine.

Also in late September, Torba announced that the Gab website's online infrastructure would be upgraded to "preserve a parallel Christian society on the internet for generations to come". On September 22, Torba wrote that "Our vision for Gabvertising and the parallel economy we are building is to empower families and freedom-loving business owners to free themselves from the slavery of Woke Capital" and that "The natural evolution of free speech is free markets, and that's what is forming right now on Gab. An actual free market, not one rigged by a handful globalist big bankers and hedge funds".

==== Hacks and data leaks ====
On the evening of February 19, Gab's website briefly went offline, originally without explanation. In response, several Twitter users posted images showing Gab accounts run by right-wing media outlets, such as The Gateway Pundit and National File, asking people to donate funds to a suspicious URL. After the site was restored, Torba responded in a blog post saying that Gab themselves had taken the site offline at around 6:25 pm EST, sixteen minutes after they "became aware of several accounts that were posting bitcoin wallet spam and related content". According to Torba, fewer than 20 accounts were affected, Gab "have no indication that any sensitive account information was breached or accessed by any unauthorized users", and that "Because of our quick action zero bitcoin was sent". Torba did not specify which accounts were affected. Torba also said that Gab had "identified and patched a security vulnerability in our codebase" and that "Our engineering team is conducting a full audit of our logs and infrastructure".

On February 26, around a week after Gab briefly went offline, the company published a blog post denying a data breach had taken place. In the post, they wrote that they had been contacted by unnamed reporters who asked about a data breach that may have exposed an archive of posts, direct messages, profiles, and hashed passwords on Gab. Torba wrote in the blog post that there was no independent confirmation that a breach had taken place, and that Gab collects "very little from our users in terms of personal information". He also accused the reporters of working with a hacker to hurt the company and its users. However, a reporter linked to DDoSecrets tweeted "Yes, we have the data" and promised more information "soon enough".

On February 28, DDoSecrets revealed "GabLeaks", a collection of more than 70 gigabytes of data from Gab, including more than 40 million posts, passwords, private messages, and other leaked information. The data was given to the group by a hacktivist self-identifying as "JaXpArO and My Little Anonymous Revival Project", who retrieved the data from Gab's back-end databases to expose the platform's largely right-wing userbase. DDoSecrets co-founder Emma Best called GabLeaks "another gold mine of research for people looking at militias, neo-Nazis, the far right, QAnon and everything surrounding January 6". DDoSecrets said that they would not release the data publicly due to the data containing a large amount of private and sensitive information and will instead share the data with select journalists, social scientists, and researchers. Andy Greenberg from Wired confirmed that the data "does appear to contain Gab users' individual and group profiles—their descriptions and privacy settings—public and private posts, and passwords".

In response, Torba acknowledged the data breach, said that his Gab account had been "compromised", and that "the entire company is all hands investigating what happened and working to trace and patch the problem". He also used a transphobic slur to insult the hackers "attacking" Gab and referred to them as "demon hackers". On March 1, Torba revealed in a post on Gab's blog that the company had received a ransom demand of $500,000 in Bitcoin for the data, and wrote in response that they would not be paying it. Also on March 1, Torba said in a Gab post that "I want to make clear that we have zero tolerance for any threats of violence including against the wicked people who are attacking Gab. We need to pray for these people. I am."

Dan Goodin reported in Ars Technica on March 2 that Gab's CTO, Fosco Marotto, had in February introduced a SQL vulnerability that may have led to the data breach, and that Gab had subsequently scrubbed the commit from Git history. The company had previously open sourced Gab's source code in a Git repository which included all historical commits; on March 1, they took the repository offline and replaced it with a zipfile that did not include commit history.

On March 8, JaXpArO again compromised verified accounts on Gab, posting a message to their feeds addressed to Torba, which said the service had been "fully compromised" the previous week and accused him of lying to Gab's users. Gab briefly went offline again the same day, and the company wrote on Twitter that they had taken their site offline "to investigate a security breach". Torba posted a statement in response to the attack, claiming that "The attacker who stole data from Gab harvested OAuth2 bearer tokens during their initial attack" and that "Though their ability to harvest new tokens was patched, we did not clear all tokens related to the original attack. By reusing these old tokens, the attacker was able to post 177 statuses in an 8-minute period today".

In May, The Intercept used GabLeaks to solicit donations. Former Intercept reporter Glenn Greenwald criticized the publication for exploiting what he called an invasion of privacy, which he said contrasted with The Intercept's origins during the Snowden leaks. In response, a spokesperson for The Intercept said that "We do not apologize for our interest in reporting on fascist activity."

In early December, Torba claimed that Gab's back-end system was under a cyberattack by "porn bots". Torba called it "the most sophisticated attack we have seen in five years", adding that "the timing of it is incredibly interesting given that Truth Social and Rumble both raised a boatload of cash this week from hedge funds to compete with Gab". On December 4, Torba said that "All new Gab accounts must now be manually approved by our team until further notice". According to The Daily Beast, "It is unclear whether such a cyberattack took place or what specific "bots" the Gab CEO was referring to, but a casual search of the platform did show numerous accounts advertising "escort" services."

=== 2022 ===
On January 24, 2022, Torba announced that Gab would sponsor the America First Political Action Conference (AFPAC) run by white nationalist commentator Nick Fuentes. Torba also criticized the Conservative Political Action Conference and Turning Point USA, saying that "CPAC is sponsored by Facebook and Google among other billionaires" and "TPUSA is sponsored by atheist libertarian billionaires." Torba has also entered into a partnership with Fuentes' livestreaming service. Torba received backlash from Gab users over the sponsorship, with many pointing out that Fuentes had recently made harsh comments about Gab users, including one comment calling users "fucking retarded" and another comment stating: "Average IQ on Gab is like 50". Many of Gab's donors said that they would stop funding Gab. In response to the backlash, Torba said that "Controversy is attention. Attention is influence" and that "The point of marketing is to influence people to get off Big Tech and get on Gab. In order to do that I need their attention." It was later announced that Torba would be a guest speaker at the AFPAC. Torba also created an account on Fuentes' livestreaming service.

In March 2022, Vice News reported that RT had started a channel on Gab's video sharing platform Gab TV, which describes itself as a "free speech broadcasting platform." Vice News also noted Torba's support for Russia's invasion of Ukraine and Torba publicly supporting RT, claiming that they are being subject to the same censorship as American conservatives "by Big Tech and the globalist regime". Torba also falsely claimed that Gab is "the one place on the internet where you can find RT News" when RT also has a presence on video sharing platform Rumble.

In April 2022, Torba offered Elon Musk a board seat along with equity in Gab in exchange for Musk selling his Twitter shares and investing $2 billion into Gab. This came after Musk sent Twitter an offer to buy the entire company for $43 billion. Also in April, Torba made another offer to Musk, saying "What we are missing at the moment is an ISP. I fear that the next big leap of censorship is at the ISP level, with ISP's blocking access to Gab.com. You solve that problem with Starlink. Together we can build infrastructure for a free speech internet."

On May 15, 2022, after the Buffalo shooting that killed seven Black people, Torba told his followers that procreation is the best solution to the great replacement and White genocide conspiracy theories.

In an email to The New York Times regarding a July 2022 article about the rise of white Christian nationalism, Torba wrote, "Jesus Christ is King of Kings and we are going to lawfully, peacefully, and democratically take back this country and our culture in his name" and that "[t]here is absolutely nothing you or any of the other powers and principalities can do to stop us."

In 2022, Gab launched GabPay as an alternative to PayPal. St. Louis Jewish Light noted that "GabPay is more than just an app, though. It's part of a larger project: an attempt to build an entirely parallel Christian economy, Christian internet and, eventually, Christian nationalist country." After PayPal appeared to allow for fining users up to $2500 for posting misinformation, which it later retracted as unintended, Torba thanked it for sending him "tens of thousands" of new GabPay users.

==== Doug Mastriano's payment to Gab ====
In July 2022, Eric Hananoki of Media Matters for America revealed that Doug Mastriano, Republican nominee for the 2022 Pennsylvania gubernatorial election, paid Gab $5,000 for "campaign consulting." on April 28, 2022. As a result of the payments, every new account on Gab automatically followed Mastriano's account. Torba claimed that the money did not go towards consulting, but was instead used to pay for advertisements on Gab. Torba also endorsed Mastriano's campaign for Governor of Pennsylvania, calling him "a strong Christian man to lead PA out of the pit of hell and into the glory of God." Torba defended his views on Christian nationalism, saying that "We must be grounded in Biblical Truth and led by people who call Christ their King". The Republican Jewish Coalition denounced the payment, citing Gab as a hotspot for antisemitism and white supremacy. The head of the coalition, Matt Brooks, asked Mastriano to delete his Gab account and terminate all associations with the platform. Mastriano's connection to Gab was additionally condemned by state representative Dan Frankel, state attorney general Josh Shapiro, and by Democratic Jewish organizations. In August 2022, Mastriano released a statement denouncing antisemitism and distanced himself from Torba, saying that he "doesn't speak for me or my campaign". Mastriano also deleted his Gab account.

== Users and content ==
=== Users ===
The site has attracted far-right or alt-right users who have been banned or suspended from other services. Since its foundation in 2016, high-profile participants have included former Breitbart News writer and polemicist Milo Yiannopoulos; citizen journalist Tim Pool; conservative commentator Dave Rubin; former British National Party leader Nick Griffin; Australian neo-Nazis Blair Cottrell and Neil Erikson and Australian MP George Christensen; Republican Party representatives Marjorie Taylor Greene, Lauren Boebert, and Paul Gosar; former Republican Party of Texas chairman Allen West; former White House chief strategist Steve Bannon; Dutch politician and Leader of the Party for Freedom Geert Wilders; and white supremacists Richard B. Spencer, Tila Tequila, Vox Day, and Christopher Cantwell. Far-right political parties and party candidates, including Britain First, Spanish Vox, and UKIP candidates such as Mark Meechan and Carl Benjamin, have also been participants. Following the Christchurch mosque shootings and a reduced tolerance on other social media for hate speech, several members of United Patriots Front, an Australian far-right extremist organization, urged their supporters to follow them on Gab after being banned from Twitter and Facebook. Disclose.tv, a German disinformation outlet with a following that includes Holocaust deniers and neo-Nazis, maintains an account on Gab.

On January 24, 2021, the Republican Party of Texas made a post on its Twitter account asking their followers to join Gab. In March 2021, the Republican Party of Texas voted to delete their Gab account.

Former Gab users include white nationalist political candidate Paul Nehlen, who was removed from the site for doxing the man behind the "Ricky Vaughn" Twitter account; and hacker, internet troll, and former Daily Stormer writer Andrew "Weev" Auernheimer, who was banned for calling for genocide against Jews and endorsing terrorist Timothy McVeigh. Auernheimer's activity prompted threats from Gab's then webhost Asia Registry to remove the comments or they would refuse to host the site. Christopher Cantwell, a white supremacist and neo-Nazi activist who "once drove a significant amount of interaction on the small site", was banned from the site in March 2019 after using the site to advocate in the wake of the 2019 Christchurch shootings that future mass killers should target and murder left-wing activists, instead of "random people in mosques and synagogues", in order to effectively silence left-wing activism.

Torba has described the average Gab user as "a Conservative Christian with a family and interests in hunting, fishing, cars, camping, news, politics, rural living, homeschooling, privacy, free speech, cryptocurrency, guns, and cooking". Torba stated in 2016 that Gab is "not designed specifically for conservatives" and has stated that "we welcome everyone and always will" and "We want everyone to feel safe on Gab, but we're not going to police what is hate speech and what isn't", although he admitted that Gab was attracting "a lot of people on the right because they are being censored, so it's understandable they are migrating over". In November 2016, Torba told The Washington Post that "I didn't set out to build a 'conservative social network' by any means ... but I felt that it was time for a conservative leader to step up and to provide a forum where anybody can come and speak freely without fear of censorship". In filings made with the SEC in March 2018, Gab stated that its target market is "conservative, libertarian, nationalists, and populist internet users around the world" "who are seeking alternative news media platforms like Breitbart.com, DrudgeReport.com, Infowars.com". In an interview with Vice News in August 2019, Torba acknowledged that Gab was right-leaning, saying that "any online community that is explicitly pro-free speech will inevitably become right-leaning" and claimed that "this is because in the free market of ideas right-leaning ideas win".

In early 2018, a cross-university group released a research study on posts made to the site. According to that study, the site hosted a high volume of racism and hate speech, and primarily "attracts alt-right users, conspiracy theorists, and other trolls". The study listed Carl Benjamin, Ann Coulter, Alex Jones, Stefan Molyneux, Lauren Southern, and Paul Joseph Watson as some of the more popular users of the site. The authors also performed an automated search using Hatebase and found "hate words" in 5.4% of Gab posts, which they stated was 2.4 times higher than their occurrence on Twitter but less than half that found on /pol/, a far-right political discussion board on 4chan. The authors of the study stated in their conclusion that while anyone can join Gab, the site is aligned with the alt-right and its use of free speech rhetoric "merely functions as a shield for its alt-right users to hide behind".

A 2018 paper authored by behavioral researchers that was presented at the 2018 SBP-BRiMS collected and analyzed "several million Gab messages" posted on the Gab website from the platform's launch in August 2016 to February 2018. The researchers then divided the posts into 33 groups, including topics such as pop culture. The researchers found that the largest category of posts on Gab was politics, comprising 56% of all posts collected and analyzed. The researchers also found that the largest subcategory within politics was "Ideology, religion and race", comprising 10.23% of all posts. According to paper co-author William D. Adler, a political science professor at Northeastern Illinois University, the subcategory "Ideology, religion, and race" "includes topics such as changing racial demographics, threats to Christianity, and concerns about Jewish influence", adding "It's a lot of what you might think of as white nationalism". Other subcategories within politics included conversations about "Trump, Clinton and conspiracies", comprising 5.10% of all posts, and "Globalism", a dog whistle for antisemitic conspiracy theories, comprising 1.95% of all posts. The researchers also linked Gab's growth to the far-right. According to Alder, Gab's free speech rhetoric is "part of the game here, of course", adding that "They don't want to say [what they're really doing] out loud, so they say 'free speech, free speech.'" Based on the results of the paper, Noah Berlatsky of The Forward noted: "In contrast, there is little discussion of left topics that might be considered to push the edges of acceptable discourse. There are no Stalinist apologia, for example, nor calls for violent Communist revolution. More, there is not an equivalent on the left for Gab, or for the other right wing social media networks like WrongThink (modeled on Facebook) or GoyFundMe (a right wing Kickstarter, which even has an implicitly anti-Semitic name.) Extremist social media bubbles are not a both sides problem; they are a right-wing phenomenon".

A report issued by the ADL and the Network Contagion Research Institute on March 12, 2019, found that when Twitter bans "extremist voices", Gab's user base grows. Researchers from Northeastern Illinois University publishing in First Monday wrote in August 2019 that many of the sites shared by Gab's users "are associated with state-sponsored propaganda from foreign governments". Researchers publishing in e-Extreme wrote in October 2020 that many of Gab's users are Trump supporters who feel they are being censored on mainstream platforms, and "this sense of persecution is the reason why many join the platform, while an overarching shared sense of victimhood – whether as members of a 'white race', free-speech absolutists, or Trump supporters – unites the broader community". In 2021, a study published by an international team of researchers titled "Understanding the Effect of Deplatforming on Social Networks". found that being banned on Twitter or Reddit led those users who were banned to join alternative platforms such as Gab or Parler, which have more lax content moderation. The study also found that while users who move to these platforms have their audience potentially reduced, the users exhibit increased activity and toxicity than they did previously. Also in 2021, researchers found that Gab users are "united by a shared sense of techno-social persecution at the hands of 'Big Tech', a commitment to the ultra-libertarian values of the platform, and in many cases, a material investment in Gab as an Alt-Tech project."

In June 2021, the Lowy Institute noted of Gab's userbase that "Regardless of which narrative a user in Gab's far-right community ascribes to, a shared sense of techno-social persecution is what draws them in and unites them. These users feel safe in the knowledge that they can "speak freely" on the platform, with little fear of being banned or even critiqued, regardless of how extreme their views are".

On October 11, 2021, researcher Sefa Ozalp published a report for the ADL's Center on Extremism (COE) titled "For Twitter Users, Gab's Toxic Content is Just a Click Away", which analyzed how many links to Gab's website were shared on Twitter between June 7, 2021, and August 22, 2021. The report found that, during this time period, more than 112,000 tweets were posted that linked to Gab's website (shared by more than 32,700 users) with a potential reach of more than 254 million views. The report also found that the fifty most shared links to Gab on Twitter "were rife with conspiratorial content and misinformation, some promoted by Gab itself via its verified Twitter account". Out of these fifty most shared links, sixteen "promoted misinformation and conspiracy theories about Covid-19" and twenty-one "contained conspiratorial content by Japanese-language accounts", including false claims about COVID-19 and COVID-19 vaccines, Microsoft co-founder Bill Gates, and QAnon. Ozalp said that the ADL was not advocating for Twitter to completely ban Gab or links to Gab from its platform, instead advocating in favor of Twitter more effectively enforcing its current policies against misinformation and hate speech. Ozalp also said of Twitter that "Even if they are not acting like a knowing or willing contributor to anti-vax or anti-Semitism stuff, they are still playing a part in [the] dissemination of these conspiracy theories or hate, probably without wanting to do so". Twitter spokesperson Elizabeth Busby responded to the report by claiming that Twitter takes action against links to third-party websites that "would otherwise violate our policies if their content were posted directly on Twitter", including COVID-19 misinformation. Busby also said that "As ADL's report acknowledges, we continue to improve our approach to mis- and disinformation". Later on October 11, Torba criticized the ADL's report in a blog post, claiming that it was created in an attempt to "pressure Twitter to censor us". He also accused the organization of being an "anti-Christ, Anti-American, and Anti-White hate organization". In a statement, the ADL said that Torba's response "is consistent with other statements from Gab" and that they "speak for themselves". According to Ozalp, the report is part of a "longer running research series" by the ADL that will include more studies on other social media platforms.

In December 2021, researchers at the University of Southern California Dornsife College of Letters, Arts and Sciences found that Gab users who shared similar moral values and beliefs with members of their immediate groups were more vulnerable to radicalization, including a higher likelihood of dissemination of hate speech and the use of language intended to dehumanize or threaten violence against users outside of their immediate groups.

A June 2022 report from the Stanford Internet Observatory found that "The deplatforming events following January 6 were a huge boost to Gab, and may have resulted in millions of dollars of income for Gab, potentially keeping it solvent." as well as resulting in "a massive spike in new users" and "thousands of new 'Pro' subscriptions and donations". This helped Gab "fund real-world activities such as the white nationalist AFPAC conference." Gab's growth in users had previously been stagnant with "increasing monetary losses". Secondly, the report found that in 2021 and 2022, Gab "had significant growth in anti-vaccine protest organizing, with 'trucker convoy' groups having tens of thousands of members and high post volume." Thirdly, the report found that "Extreme anti-Semitic, racist and homophobic content is rife [on Gab], with open praise of Nazism, encouragement of violence against minorities, and 'Great Replacement' narratives.", with "such content appear[ing] even in 'mainstream' user groups." Lastly, the report found that "Gab contains much of the same toxic content as "purpose-built" neo-Nazi sites such as Stormfront".

A 2023 study found that there was less polarization of its user base than on Facebook, as well as more open discourse about a variety of topics. The authors of the study believed the major contributor to the lack of polarization was the lack of diversity in the site—essentially being an echo chamber.

=== Donald Trump ===
In early February 2021, multiple media outlets falsely reported that former-President Trump had joined Gab under the handle @realdonaldtrump. The Independent speculated "that confusion arose from the presence of a blue check mark indicating the account was verified" and Vice News speculated that the bio of the account, which read "45th President of the United States of America. Uncensored posts from the @realDonaldTrump Feed", had also caused confusion. The Gab post that was mistaken to be from Trump was actually from Torba and featured a copy of a genuine letter sent by Trump's lawyers to Democratic Representative Jamie Raskin, who had called on Trump to testify at his second impeachment hearing. Thousands of users on Gab were also led to believe after the post was made that Trump had joined the platform under the handle. Torba responded to the false reports in a blog post, saying that "@realdonaldtrump is and always has been a mirror archive of POTUS' tweets and statements that we've run for years. We've always been transparent about this and would obviously let people know if the President starts using it". He also criticized the media outlets that falsely reported that Trump had joined the platform. Also in response to the false reports, the @realdonaldtrump Gab account made a post that was pinned saying that the account is reserved for Trump and urged users of Gab to send messages to Trump asking him to join the platform.

In March 2021, Forbes reported that representatives of former Senior Advisor Jared Kushner in January had asked for equity in Gab in exchange for Kushner's father-in-law Trump joining the platform. Torba declined the offer, saying "No, I'm not entertaining that".

In a June 2021 interview with far-right conspiracy theory website TruNews, Torba claimed that Kushner wanted Gab to remove antisemitic content and users from its platform before Trump could join, saying that "He called them Jew-haters, I called them Jew criticizers" and that "It's a free-speech platform, so as long as you're not saying anything illegal, as long as you're not making threats of violence, you're allowed to speak your mind and have an opinion about things, and I was not going to compromise on that position". No independent confirmation has been made that such a negotiation took place.

In August 2022, Adam Bies, a man in rural Mercer County, Pennsylvania, was charged with making death threats against FBI agents on Gab after the FBI search of Mar-a-Lago. Torba had given data from Bies to the FBI, including an email, IP addresses, and chat logs. In response, Gab users accused Torba of betraying Gab's userbase and commitment to free speech, as well as likening Torba to Judas Iscariot, the disciple who betrayed Jesus. Many users criticized Torba for giving the data to the FBI without a subpoena. In response, Torba did not apologize for cooperating with the FBI, said that "threatening anyone—federal agent or not—is not the right way to do it", and said that Gab is dedicated to upholding "lawful speech and lawful speech only." While some Gab users accepted the response from Torba, others continued to criticize him. In response to the continued criticism, Torba said that "People who threaten to murder people on the internet are not my 'pals.'"

=== COVID-19 vaccine avoidance and disinformation ===
In late July 2021, Torba claimed in a Gab post that he was "getting flooded" with text messages from members of the U.S. military who claimed that they would be court-martialed if they refused a COVID-19 vaccine. The post amassed 10,000 likes and shares. Torba also posted documents on Gab's news site that contain misinformation about the COVID-19 vaccine and claimed in an email in response to The New York Times that "I'm telling the truth" and "Your Facebook-funded 'fact checkers' like Graphika are wrong and are the people peddling disinformation here". Torba also posted a conversation he had with the Times reporter, saying "I am sharing this all with you now to let you know how these wicked people operate and to shine a light on their lies, deception, and anti-Christian attacks. They aren't just attacking me, they are attacking any and all dissent and opposition to their libido dominandi (lust for power)".

In August 2021, Alex Kaplan of Media Matters for America noted that Torba "is trying to use his platform to sabotage coronavirus vaccination efforts".

In October 2021, John Gallagher of LGBTQ Nation wrote that "A visitor to Gab will find misinformation about COVID, calls to arrest NIH [NIAID] head Dr. Anthony Fauci, and lies about the 2020 presidential election. One post, liked by more than 4,000 people, shows a gloating Trump under the line, 'Show me a pic of pregnant Michelle Obama, and I'll concede the 2020 election.'"

On March 14, 2022, Torba shared a baseless QAnon conspiracy theory claiming that Trump was mispronouncing the word "China" on purpose to secretly signal that Ukraine was behind the development of COVID-19.

=== Userbase estimates ===
In November 2021, when asked by The Washington Post about Gab's Brazilian user base, Torba responded in an email on November 8, saying "Ya my comment is 'God bless Jair Bolsonaro and Jesus Christ is King.' No further comment."

As of March 2021, Gab has 4 million registered users. According to Micah Lee writing for The Intercept, the "vast majority" of registered Gab accounts are inactive, and the number of active users on the site is closer to 100,000. In 2021, Torba claimed that Gab has 15 million unique monthly visitors. As of August 2021, Torba has more than 3 million followers on Gab, with all Gab users following him by default.

As of the summer of 2022, Gab had over 5 million registered users.

=== Antisemitic content ===
Rita Katz, a researcher and analyst of terrorism and extremism, wrote in Politico Magazine in October 2018 that Robert Bowers' extreme antisemitic postings were "anything but an anomaly" on the website, and, "[they highlight] concerns about its growing facilitation of white nationalism and other far-right movements". She found that Gab user profiles often contained Nazi symbolism, and Stormfront users had praised the site as a place to post antisemitic content. Katz found that many Gab users were celebrating immediately after Bowers' massacre against the Tree of Life synagogue, and wrote that far-right communities' rise to popularity on Gab is "remarkably similar" to the rise of ISIS on social media. In November 2018, Twitter user Jason Baumgartner, who owns a website dedicated to detecting hate speech on social media, found that using the search term "oven" on Gab brought up the terms "Jews", "Holocaust", and "Hitler" the most among thousands of analyzed comments.

Joshua Fisher-Birch of the Counter Extremism Project said in 2019: "Gab has always been attractive to fascist and neo-Nazi groups that advocate violence". The same month, non-profit left-wing media collective Unicorn Riot discovered that individual Gab users led by alt-right figure Brittany Pettibone organized on the video game chat and VoIP platform Discord and that some of the discussions centered on antisemitism and achieving "ethno-nationalism". The Jewish Chronicle reported in January 2019 that they had found material on the site accusing Jews of responsibility for the September 11 attacks. After setting up a fake account on Gab, the newspaper's journalist Ben Weich was quickly "presented with a steady stream of Holocaust denial, antisemitic tropes and conspiracy theories – as well as those venerating Adolf Hitler". Posts he discovered included at least one user who used a swastika as their profile picture and stated: "The parasitic Jews will fully deserve the genocide that's coming upon them" and "They do not deserve mercy, expulsion will never fix a rat problem, extermination does".

In addition to allowing Holocaust denial and other forms of antisemitism, Gab has been used as a recruitment tool by several neo-Nazi and alt-right groups, including Identity Evropa, Patriot Front, and the Atomwaffen Division, a terrorist organization tied to a number of murders.

Cultural Marxism, a far-right antisemitic conspiracy theory, is a popular topic on Gab.

==== By Gab ====
Gab itself has engaged in antisemitic commentary. Torba has repeatedly praised Holocaust denier Nick Fuentes.

On August 9, 2018, in response to a post from Jewish political activist Brian Krassenstein calling for the shutdown of the site, Gab's Twitter account responded with a post suggesting that it is unsurprising for a person with a Jewish last name to oppose "free speech", followed by a tweet from the platform calling for "open borders for Israel", a quote from former Ku Klux Klan leader David Duke, and posted another tweet the same hour with a citation to a Bible verse (Revelation 3:9) that referred to Jewish non-believers of Jesus as members of the "synagogue of Satan". The company's Twitter account also posted a tweet on August 9 alluding to the antisemitic trope of Jewish global control, saying "At some point you have to ask yourself: just who is pushing for the censorship?". On October 31, 2018, The Washington Post pointed to two messages on Gab's Twitter account and wrote that they "raise questions about whether they cross the line into impropriety". One captioned a photo of two men, one with Jewish sidelocks, with "These two guys show up at your front door. Who do you let in and who do you call the cops on?" before following it up with "I mean I'm calling the cops on both and getting my shotgun ready, just saying", and another argued for opposition to immigration by saying: "Let a bunch of Somalians migrate to your neighborhood and see if you change your mind". Torba initially questioned the authenticity of the posts, suggesting they might be doctored images, later saying the posts were "clearly satire/comedy ... to get people discussing the importance of free expression for satire, comedy, political discourse, and legitimate criticism", and then later saying they were "a few edgy tweets posted by interns". The tweets were later deleted.

On January 14, 2021, Molly Boigon from The Forward noted that Gab's Twitter account had recently posted multiple tweets about Senior Adviser Jared Kushner's supposed influence on then-President Trump, which she described as a nod to the antisemitic trope about global Jewish puppet masters. Gab's Twitter account had also recently posted a tweet questioning the legitimacy of antisemitism falling under hate speech. In February 2021, Gab posted on their Twitter account that going forward, they would only respond to press inquiries from "Christian media compan[ies]", describing other publications as "pagan propogandists [sic]". In March 2021, Ali Breland reported in Mother Jones on private messages leaked in that month's data breach, which showed Torba welcoming Iranian-American alt-right personality Roosh V and praising another Gab user, the antisemitic writer E. Michael Jones. Oren Segal of the ADL said that the messages seemed "to show that Torba has a direct appreciation for individuals that promote antisemitism and hate". In June 2021, Torba criticized Rumble for changing its terms of service to prohibit antisemitic hate speech and questioned why the platform did not also prohibit "Anti-White hatred". Also in June 2021, Tom McKay from Gizmodo wrote that "Torba is perhaps best known for furious diatribes in which he characterizes claims that he or his shitty site is racist or anti-Semitic as left-wing media smears, despite bounteous evidence suggesting that is exactly what they are".

On October 13, 2021, Torba used Gab's Twitter account to praise E. Michael Jones, an antisemitic Catholic writer, calling him a "brilliant and faithful Christian man" who will be "one of the most respected thinkers of our time" when "we win." Jones has claimed that Jews are dedicated to attacking the Catholic Church and western civilization.

On October 17, 2021, Torba used Gab's Twitter account to tweet a screenshot of a post from a Gab user named "Kitler". The post states that "if you're a White person living in America today and you don't know what happened to the kulaks in russia [sic] 100 years ago, you should look it up. Something very similar is happening to you right now, and the same group of people is behind it." The Gab post alludes to the belief that Jews were responsible for the 1917 Russian Revolution and communism while also implying that Jews were responsible for the subsequent efforts by the Bolsheviks to seize land from kulaks (wealthy farmers) and deport kulaks to the remote regions of the Soviet Union. One user replied to Gab's tweet with a screenshot of a page from Adolf Hitler's Mein Kampf.

On October 19, 2021, Torba used the Gab Twitter account to post a series of tweets which The Daily Dot characterized as a "wildly antisemitic tirade" with "several antisemitic canards related to Judeo–Bolshevism". Torba also promoted the creation of a "parallel Christian society." After receiving criticism for these remarks, Torba responded by saying that "Sadly many Christians today are so afraid of being called a silly meaningless name by the world (bigot, antisemite, homophobe) that they refuse to even remotely share or discuss the Gospel in their daily lives, let alone live it" and that "You reveal your anti-Christian hatred when you refer to Biblical Truth as 'antisemitism.'" Shortly after making these comments, Torba shared a comic from far-right illustrator StoneToss which promotes the antisemitic myth that Jews were responsible for crucifying Jesus. Torba also retweeted a meme claiming that the Talmud, the central text of Rabbinic Judaism, instructs Jews to hate Christians. Shortly after posting these tweets, Torba deactivated Gab's Twitter account. Torba has deactivated the account multiple times in the past, which some researchers have said is a strategy to avoid being suspended from Twitter. Gab's Twitter account was reactivated around late November 2021. The ADL "found dozens of examples of antisemitic tweets in the replies to Gab's tweets from" October. "These replies promoted various tropes about Jews, including that Jews are 'degenerate' and the 'synagogue of Satan.'" The ADL also criticized Twitter for continuing "to allow content that violates its own policies via links to Gab's website, where harmful disinformation and offensive content run rampant."

According to the ADL, "Throughout October and early November 2021, Torba used his own platform, Gab, which has considerably fewer content guardrails and restrictions than mainstream sites, to disseminate a plethora of antisemitic content. These posts often include vague references to 'them' or 'the enemy' and are framed by Torba's Christian faith." On November 2, 2021, Torba posted on Gab that "Zionists" created the Federal Reserve for the "subversion of American Christianity." One user responded by claiming that non-Jews became "slaves of the [Jewish] tribe" due to a plot orchestrated by the Jewish Rothschild family. On November 4, 2021, Torba reposted Gab user Jacob Wohl's "suggestion" that all Jews should decorate their home with Christmas decorations during Christmas to assimilate into America's Christian heritage. One user responded by suggesting that Jews control the Federal Reserve and that Jewish banker Jacob Schiff funded and orchestrated the Russian Revolution. Both suggestions are references to antisemitic tropes.

In January 2022, Mira Fox from The Forward noted that Gab "has weaponized antisemitism and Christian extremism to foment insurrection". Fox also noted that "Torba himself has authored numerous articles demonizing Jews for a variety of ills, including a piece on the Ukrainian Holodomor famine that opens by wondering, speciously, why it is not considered a tragedy at the level of the Holocaust, and ends by implying the Holodomor was a Jewish attempt to wipe out Ukrainian Christians – and, in a pointed aside, noting that Biden's cabinet also includes many Jews."

In late July 2022, Media Matters published an article highlighting Torba's reposting of antisemitic statements that doubt the Holocaust, accuse Jews of being too powerful, and blame them for the killing of Jesus.

In August 2022, in response to an interview of ADL CEO Jonathan Greenblatt, Torba said that "We're not bending the knee to the 2 percent anymore", in reference to the percentage of Jewish people in the United States.

As of February 1, 2024, Gab has blocked anyone with an Israeli IP address from using their service or accessing content.

=== Violence and terrorism policy ===
Gab's official policy states that the company has a "zero-tolerance policy towards threats of violence and use of our platform for criminal purposes".

Terrorism researcher and Queen's University in Kingston, professor Amarnath Amarasingam has said that Gab's position as neither extremely mainstream nor obscure service has allowed extremists to permeate the website and access an audience they would not be able to have on a more popular service, where they would be more likely to be banned.

Gab has denied that terror groups flourish on the website, saying in a statement to Motherboard in July 2019: "We don't want them, we strongly discourage them from joining and we ban them when they cross the line, as they often do". However, Ben Makuch of Motherboard wrote that neo-Nazi terrorist groups have "enjoyed months-long, unfettered stints posting their content on Gab to a significant audience". In addition to calls for terrorist attacks, mass killings against minorities, offline armed training recruitments and white supremacist propaganda accumulated on Gab, Makuch pointed to one Gab post, from a user who is a member of a multinational militant network on Gab connected to the Atomwaffen Division, that had explicitly called for its followers to attack electric grids. Other content posted by the network included explicit calls for sympathizers to join local neo-Nazi organizations and commit violence against Muslim and Jewish communities. In June 2019, two British men were arrested on terror offences for posting propaganda on Gab calling for their followers to assassinate Prince Harry.

=== Moderation policy ===
Gab claims that its platform does not restrict content unless the content is not protected by the First Amendment to the United States Constitution. Restrictions on content on Gab include illegal activity, credible threats of violence, promotion of terrorism, obscenity, pornography, spamming, selling weapons or drugs, child exploitation, impersonation, and doxing.

In January 2021, Jazmin Goodwin of CNN described Gab's moderation as "lax" and that this "approach on content has made way for a slew of QAnon conspiracy theories, misinformation and anti-Semitic commentary on the platform, among lots of vile hatred and racist posts – much of wouldn't be allowed on today's well-known social apps". In October 2021, Cristiano Lima of The Washington Post described Gab's moderation as "laissez-faire".

In a 2022 email, Torba said that "We tolerate 'offensive' but legal speech", that "We believe that a moderation policy which adheres to the First Amendment, thereby permitting offensive content to rise to the surface, is a valuable and necessary utility to society.", and that "Supporting the mission of freedom online means having the stomach to accept that people will say 'edgy and offensive' things". In June 2022, Torba told CNN that "Gab permits all lawful political speech that is protected by the First Amendment—including speech about inherently political topics such as the charge and punishment of treason through the US judicial system. When discussion crosses into direct and imminent threats of violence we will take action and work with our partners in law enforcement to mitigate any threats to the public."

In April 2025, Gab restricted access users in the United Kingdom, citing Online Safety Act concerns.

== Hosting and termination of services by web services providers ==
On December 14, 2016, Apple Inc. declined Gab's submission of its app to the Apple App Store, citing pornographic content as the reason. Also on December 14, Twitter cut off Gab's access to the Twitter API after Gab introduced a feature to its social network that allowed users to share their Gab posts directly to Twitter. In response, Torba said in a December 15 Periscope livestream that "This is targeted, and we believe that we're being singled out" and that "This is the nonsense from Silicon Valley. This is the monopoly and level of control that they have". On January 21, 2017, a revised version of the app that blocked pornography by default was also rejected due to "objectionable content" including "references to religion, race, gender, sexual orientation, or other targeted groups that could be offensive to many users". In response, Torba accused Apple of "double standards and extreme scrutiny" "while allowing Big Social apps to display the same and arguably worse content in their own apps". Gab launched its Android app for the Google Play Store in May 2017. Later that year, on August 17, Google removed Gab's app from the Play Store for violating its policy against hate speech, stating that the app did not "demonstrate a sufficient level of moderation, including for content that encourages violence and advocates hate against groups of people". On September 14, 2017, Gab filed an antitrust lawsuit against Google, but dropped the suit on October 22, 2017, in favor of lobbying Congress to take action against "monopolized tech giants". In early October 2018, Gab's Stripe account was suspended due to adult content on Gab. On October 3, Gab tweeted in response: "We've had this content and a NSFW setting for two years with no issues from them until now".

On October 27, 2018, the day of the Pittsburgh synagogue shooting, PayPal, GoDaddy, and Medium terminated their relationship with Gab, and PayPal released a statement that it had done so based on its review of accounts that may engage in the "perpetuation of hate, violence or discriminatory intolerance". Later on the same day, Gab announced on Twitter that Joyent, Gab's hosting provider, would terminate their service on October 29 at 9:00 am ET. Gab also said on Twitter that they expected their site to be down for weeks. Stripe and Backblaze also terminated their services with Gab after the shooting. On October 29, Gab claimed in a tweet that they "took the site down early on purpose last night because we knew the media would take the bait and have stories on it for this morning". After the site was taken down, Gab's homepage was changed to a message saying it was down due to being "under attack" and being "systematically no-platformed", adding that Gab would be inaccessible for a "period of time".

Gab returned online on November 4, 2018, after Epik agreed to register the domain, and Sibyl Systems Ltd. began to provide webhosting. Epik is an American company that provides domain registration and other web services, and is known for providing services to websites that host far-right, neo-Nazi, and other extremist content. Sibyl Systems was founded on October 22, 2018, days before the shooting that resulted in Gab's termination from their previous webhost, and according to the SPLC, was possibly based in Norway or England. Sibyl was later acquired by Epik in the second quarter of 2019.

In August 2019, Amazon Web Services ceased serving Gab's fundraising site due to Gab violating Amazon's policy on hateful content. In response, Torba said he welcomed Amazon's decision, claiming that media coverage of the decision had only brought more attention to Gab and resulted in investment offers.

As of January 2021, Gab was still using Epik as a domain registrar. Instead of hosting its service in the cloud, The Wall Street Journal reported that Gab had been renting hardware in an undisclosed data center. Gab was also using services from Cloudflare.

== Reception ==
Gab has been described as "Twitter for racists" by progressive news outlet Salon, a "hate-filled echo chamber of racism and conspiracy theories" by The Guardian, an "online cesspool of anti-Semitism" by Politico Magazine, a "safe haven for banned Twitter trolls, Gamergaters, Pizzagaters and high-profile white nationalists" by Mic, "the far-right's favorite social network" by The Verge, "the Make America Great Again of social sites" by The New York Times and "an almost anti-Twitter" by NPR. Wired criticized Gab for not explicitly prohibiting hate speech. Scholars have described Gab as "hateful", and named Gab along with 4chan and 8chan as directly radicalizing men who went on to commit violent acts. The SPLC characterized Gab as a site where its users are "radicalized aggressively". Heidi Beirich, a director of the center, stated that the site is "the number one place nowadays where white supremacists gather". The ADL called Gab a "fringe online community" and "a bastion of hatred and bigotry".

Harrison Kaminsky of Digital Trends questioned the site's longevity in September 2016, writing: "While the site's initial popularity is impressive, the potential is most likely short-lived, following the life cycle of social networks like Ello or Peach, which faded over time". Maya Kosoff of Vanity Fair wrote in September 2016: "the point of Gab may not be to grow to be a Twitter competitor ... it's providing a 'safe space' for people who want to express themselves without consequence". Amanda Hess, a critic at The New York Times, opined in November 2016 that the site is: "a throwback to the freewheeling norms of the old internet, before Twitter started cracking down on harassment and Reddit cleaned out its darkest corners. And since its debut in August, it has emerged as a digital safe space for the far right, where white nationalists, conspiracy-theorist YouTubers, and minivan majority moms can gather without liberal interference". BBC News wrote in December 2016 that Gab has "become the go-to social network for an extreme group of activists who have been chucked off of Twitter" and that "Its top hashtags list is a conservative dream. It's peppered with trends like #Trump, #MAGA ("Make America Great Again" - Trump's campaign slogan) along with far-right obsessions like Dump Star Wars and the Pizzagate conspiracy hoax".

Jeremy Carl of conservative magazine National Review opined in August 2017: "Contrast the free hand given to left-wing offensive speech to the strict controls put on right-wing speech. As just one of many examples, Gab— a free-speech social network that has grown rapidly to almost a quarter million users since its public launch just a few months ago, was just yesterday kicked off the Android app store (it has already been repeatedly denied at Apple) for "hate speech". To be clear, not all the voices on Gab are mellifluous, they have accepted a number of folks, often from the far right, who have been banned from other social networks (though this is a small portion of Gab's user base)" and "If Google and Apple are banning Gab, mainstream conservatives are crazy to think they are safe". Cheryl K. Chumley of conservative newspaper The Washington Times opined in October 2018: "with help from like-minded free thinkers, Gab can beat the leftists running these Internet sites at their own game — and in so doing, become the model for "what could one day be" for the conservative world on social media". Joe Setyon reviewed the social network for libertarian magazine Reason in October 2018, writing: "in fighting the alleged left-leaning political bias of the legacy social media platforms, Gab ran into the opposite problem". He suggested that the website was only for those who "subscribe to a certain radical subset of right-wing beliefs or are interested in seeing the feeds of those who do". Nicholas Thompson of Wired questioned the sincerity of the site's claim to be a defender for "free speech" in October 2018, writing: "To many people, Torba's First Amendment absolutism is just a talking point. The site exists less to defend the ideals of Benjamin Franklin than those of Christopher Cantwell. It chose as its logo a creature that looks rather like Pepe, the alt-right attack frog. It courted people on the far right, and it became a haven for them. Free speech can be less a principle than a smokescreen". Thompson noted that Robert Bowers likely expected affirmation from his last message that indicated his intent to carry out the Pittsburgh synagogue massacre, leading Thompson to the conclusion: "if it's a platform where someone can expect affirmation for threatening slaughter, then why should anyone help it exist?"

Kelly Weill of The Daily Beast wrote in January 2019: "Gab has always been a bad website. Nothing loads, the search function is a joke, and its member rolls are riddled with porn bots. And that's even without the neo-Nazis posting racist memes and goading each other to murder". In February 2020, Tanya Basu of MIT Technology Review characterized Gab as being frequented by "fringe far-right hate groups". In January 2021, Travis M. Andrews of The Washington Post said that Gab "has welcomed extremist right-wing figures and believers of QAnon, the loose collection of conspiracy theories that touch on everything from politics to COVID-19". In August 2021, Jacob Silverman of The New Republic wrote that Torba is "Trying to Build a White, Christian, Secessionist Tech Industry" and that Torba "represents the new, even more right-wing alternative to Silicon Valley". In September 2021, Whitney Kimball of Gizmodo wrote that Gab is "currently fashioning itself as an anti-mask LinkedIn with a job board and guidelines for getting vaccine exemptions". In December 2021, David Gilbert of Vice News called Gab "a Christian-focused social network".

In February 2022, the Associated Press wrote that "Offensive content is easy to find on Gab. A search turns up user names featuring racial epithets, as well as antisemitic screeds, neo-Nazi fantasies and homophobic rants." In June 2022, the Stanford Internet Observatory said that "While sites such as Parler and Gettr generally cater to a broader base of right-wing users, the far-right platform Gab hews more toward an openly white Christian nationalist demographic."

A May 2022 Pew Research Center poll found that 11 percent of American adults had heard of Gab, while 1 percent of American adults get their news from Gab regularly. In addition, 79 percent of Gab profiles expressed a value or political orientation, 35 percent of profiles express right-leaning or pro-Trump values, 37 percent express a religious identity and an additional 37 percent express patriotism or pro-American values. A previous September audit of Gab by Pew Research found that Gab is the only platform out of seven alt-tech platforms examined that has not removed posts for misinformation, harassment or offensive content. A previous June 2022 review of Gab content by Pew Research found that of the 200 prominent Gab accounts, 80 percent posted about guns, 74 percent posted about abortion, 73 percent posted about LGBT issues, 70 percent discussed vaccines, and 69 percent had posted about the January 6 Capitol attack.

In October 2022, Mira Fox of the St. Louis Jewish Light wrote that "when I opened up [Gab] to write this piece, one of the first posts I saw, with 1,500 likes, explained that any hatred of Black people and Jews isn't racist because it's based on 'their behavior,' not ethnicity. Many of the replies took issue with this position — because it was not racist enough. As one person succinctly put it in the comments, 'Jews are inbred parasites.'".

Michael Edison Hayden, an open-source intelligence analyst and investigative reporter on extremism and disinformation, opined in a Gizmodo interview in October 2018: "Andrew Torba, the CEO of Gab, will get angry when people ... call his site a white nationalist website or an alt-right website but anyone who spends time on it knows that it's a haven for extremists. ... Violent white supremacist groups like Patriot Front and Atomwaffen Division organize out in the open on Gab. Users frequently call for the murder of women, Jews and other minorities on Gab, and are rewarded with likes and reposts. ... Dylann Roof is treated as a hero by many Gab users". Hayden noted that Gab was "rife with" content similar to that posted by Robert Bowers', with many users posing in his support using the hashtag #HeroRobertBowers. In August 2019, director of the Centre for Analysis of the Radical Right, Matthew Feldman, said of Gab's stance on free speech that "'free speech' in Gab's context has too often meant 'free to engage in hate speech and incitement' with minimal curation by site moderators or, it seems, owners". In March 2021, Nathalie Van Raemdonck, a doctoral researcher at the Vrije Universiteit Brussels who researches platform architecture, said of Gab's launch that "It's not necessarily that Gab rewarded the best content, or punished the worst, but does it reward what the group thinks" and that "Because the people on the platform were already terrible, they needed engaging conversations to stimulate each other, so it became a circlejerk to the bottom". Van Raemdonck also noted of Gab that "The fact that they portrayed themselves as a free-speech platform attracts a certain crowd".

Milo Yiannopoulos, an active user of Gab who joined after being deplatformed from Facebook and Twitter, complained in September 2019 about the low number of users on Gab, Parler, and Telegram. He wrote on Telegram that, after losing his large fanbases on Facebook and Twitter, he was having difficulty sustaining his career due to the relatively small number of users on the alternative social networks. He described Gab as "relentlessly, exhaustingly hostile and jam packed full of teen racists who totally dictate the tone and discussion".

In March 2021, Texas Governor Greg Abbott condemned Gab, stating "anti-Semitic platforms like Gab have no place in Texas".

In October 2021, pro-Trump Republican pundit Bill Mitchell ran a poll on Gab asking if people would attend a Christian church where the pastor uses the word "nigger" in their sermons. More than 2,000 voted and nearly two-thirds answered "Yes", prompting Mitchell to say on Gab that "As you can see from this poll so far, there are A LOT of racists on Gab" and that "It's not just a small noisy group." He also complained of having to block "over 100 accounts a day.", claimed that big accounts on Gab are "flatlining because of all the hate speech", and encouraged people to join Gettr, a conservative social media platform. Mitchell called on Torba to ban racist users on Gab "or Gab will never be taken seriously by the general public." In response, Torba said "Go over to dopey Jason Miller's Chinese billionaire-funded AI-censored hugbox for Israel-first RINO losers if you want a safe space to shout into the wind of bot accounts and Chinese nationals posing as Americans that make up the community over there". Mitchell later announced that he would leave Gab before changing his mind, saying "I think I'll just stay on Gab forever", "But from here on out, no more Mr. Nice Guy."

Gab is one of a number of alternative social network platforms, including Minds, MeWe, Parler, and BitChute, that are popular with people banned from mainstream networks such as Twitter, Facebook, YouTube, Reddit, and Instagram. Deen Freelon and colleagues writing in Science characterized Gab as among alt-tech sites that are "dedicated to right-wing communities", and listed the site along with 4chan, 8chan, BitChute, and Parler. They noted there are also more ideologically neutral alt-tech platforms, such as Discord and Telegram. Joe Mulhall of the UK anti-racism group Hope Not Hate has categorized Gab among the "bespoke platforms" for the far-right, which he defines as platforms which were created by people who themselves have "far-right leanings". He distinguishes these from "co-opted platforms" such as DLive and Telegram, which were adopted by the far-right due to minimal moderation but not specifically created for their use.

=== Chinese government influence operations ===
In September 2023, The Wall Street Journal reported that Gab was targeted by a Chinese government influence operation called Spamouflage, which aimed to spread disinformation and state propaganda.

== Company ==
Gab was founded by CEO Andrew Torba and CTO Ekrem Büyükkaya and the company was incorporated on September 9, 2016.

Torba, who described himself in 2016 as a lifelong "conservative Republican Christian", was previously removed from the Y Combinator alumni network in 2016 because of harassment concerns, starting when he used "build the wall" on Twitter alongside a screenshot of a post by a Latino startup founder that read: "being a black, Muslim or woman in the USA is going to be very scary". He also made a post on Facebook that said "All of you: fuck off. Take your morally superior, elitist, virtue signaling bullshit and shove it" and "I call it like I see it, and I helped meme a President into office, cucks". Until 2016, Torba was registered as a Democrat, although he voted Republican in presidential elections. In 2017, Torba described himself as a "cultural libertarian", a classical liberal, and an "American nationalist patriot". As of 2021, Torba says that he lives in a "forest in Pennsylvania", where he is plotting a "Silent Christian Secession". As of 2021, Torba has a policy of "not communicating with non-Christian and/or communist journos". In April 2021, Torba endorsed accelerationism, a term used by white supremacists to mean intensifying social conflicts and collapse. In 2022, Torba described himself as a Christian nationalist. In November 2022, Torba wrote that "The Jews in positions of power do not care that you have the freedom of speech in this country, they care that people like Ye have the freedom to reach a lot of people and criticize their power and oversized influence in our culture, government, and society." In January 2023, Torba called ChatGPT "satanic" and advocated for Christians to build an artificial intelligence "for the glory of God."

Utsav Sanduja later joined Gab as COO. Sanduja left the company in June 2018. In an interview with ABC News, Sanduja said that his wife, who works at a synagogue, had been doxed and received death threats while he worked at Gab: "apparently some of her personal information was found out and my family and I went through quite a lot of abuse, a systemic targeting from really vicious people, and honestly it just took a toll on us mentally". On October 28, Büyükkaya announced his resignation from Gab the day after the Pittsburgh synagogue shooting, citing "attacks from the American press" that "ha[d] taken a toll on [him] personally". In November 2020, former Facebook software engineer Fosco Marotto joined Gab as CTO.

In December 2016, Gab was headquartered in Austin, Texas. In September 2017, Gab moved its headquarters to Pennsylvania. U.S. Securities and Exchange Commission (SEC) filings, as late as March 2018, stated that Torba operated Gab out of a WeWork coworking space in Philadelphia. A WeWork spokesperson said that Torba had become a member under his own name, not Gab's, and that his time there had been brief. In late October 2018, a Gab spokesperson told The Philadelphia Inquirer that Gab was no longer based in Philadelphia. As of January 2019, Gab is headquartered in Clarks Summit, Pennsylvania.

Gab launched an AI chatbot called Arya in 2025, which has been programmed to act as an "unapologetic right-wing nationalist Christian A.I. model".

== Revenue ==
Gab earns revenue through premium subscriptions, donations, and affiliate partnerships. Gab has been refused service by several payment processors including PayPal and Stripe, causing the site to at various times rely on payments by postal mail, cryptocurrency, and "obscure" payment processors to receive payment for its subscription service. From 2017 to 2018, Gab raised $2 million from the sale of speculative securities through the crowdfunding platform StartEngine. Gab sought approval from the SEC for a Regulation A exempt offering of $10 million in 2017, but it remained pending until March 2019 when Gab withdrew the request. In a 2020 SEC filing, Gab said that "We may not be able to obtain adequate financing to continue our operations" and that Gab has yet "to earn a substantial profit or substantial operating revenue", putting into question the company's "business prospects".

=== 2016–2018 ===
Gab originally did not use advertising, describing itself as an "ad-free social network". The site began offering a subscription service for Gab named "GabPro" in mid March 2017. In November 2017, Gab launched a new tier of subscriptions called "GabPro Premium", which was targeted at content creators who wished to charge a subscription fee for their content and collect tips.

Gab lost more than $350,000 (~$441,324 in 2025) in the period from its foundation through June 30, 2018. The company relied on the online crowdfunding broker StartEngine starting in 2017. In July 2017, Gab started an investment project which met its goal of $1.07 million on August 19, 2017. In February 2018, Gab announced that it had raised $4.8 million and was planning a $10 million initial coin offering (ICO). From 2017 to 2018, Gab raised $2 million through StartEngine.

Gab reported in a December 2018 filing that removal from PayPal and Stripe following the 2018 Pittsburgh Synagogue shooting had caused a 90% drop in its subscription revenue. Following its removal, the site relied on mail and cryptocurrency for subscription payment processing.

=== 2019–present ===
Gab partnered with the "obscure" Second Amendment Processing for credit card payment processing in January 2019, but removed credit card payment options in March of the same year. This removal came after an SPLC investigation published in early March 2019 found that Thomas Michael Troyer, founder of Second Amendment Processing, had been convicted of financial crimes in 2007.

The SPLC reported in January 2019 that the company's Regulation A exempt offering of $10 million had been pending approval by the SEC since 2017. Two analysts contacted by the SPLC commented that this might suggest that "the SEC has concerns about allowing the sale to go forward". Heidi Beirich noted an unusual lack of communication records with the SEC regulators in Gab's financial filings, unlike those of similar companies. In a March 2019 SEC filing, Gab "abruptly" withdrew its request for stock sales, explaining that "[the company] has decided to seek other capital raising alternatives". Torba did not respond to SPLC inquiries regarding the withdrawal.

As of August 2019, purchasing the GabPro subscription gave users the ability to upload videos of larger file sizes, the option to be verified on Gab, and a free email address from Gab's email service. Gab had previously launched affiliate marketing with Virtual Private Network Service Providers and Gab had also previously launched its own merchandise.

In September 2019, Gab began showing "promoted posts" from affiliate partners. Users who purchase the GabPro subscription do not see the promoted posts.

On June 19, 2020, Torba claimed that he, his wife, and Gab had been "blacklisted" by Visa for "promoting hate speech". Gab was also deplatformed from PayPal.

In response to user growth on Gab during the 2020 presidential election in November, Torba claimed in an email to Gab users on November 11 that "Gab isn't growing because of 'celebrity' endorsements, sponsorships, or big paid advertising budgets, but rather from the most powerful form of advertising on the planet: word of mouth".

As of August 2021, Gab accepts donations. As of October 2021, Gab accepts donations in Bitcoin.

As of 2021, purchasing the GabPro subscription gave users "access to additional features such as the ability to apply for verification, schedule posts, get their own Gab TV channel and set posts to automatically delete after a specified period of time."

A report from June 2022 by Stanford Internet Observatory found that the deplatforming of users on social media sites following January 6, 2021 led to a surge of income which helped keep Gab afloat.

== Design ==
In 2016, Gab's color theme was a minimalist combination of black text on white panels with pink hashtags and usernames. Pro users had a contrasted top bar in dark blue. The interface displayed messages in a Twitter-like vertical scroll timeline with an option to upvote or downvote each post. The site also aggregated popular posts and trending topic hashtags. As of 2017, users could sort comments and posts in a subject by time or score. Default biographies for new users displayed a randomly chosen quotation about the importance of free speech. Users also had the option to "mute" other users and terms. As of July 2020, Gab's user interface was similar to that of Twitter, having a dashboard in the middle of the page with trending content on the left and menus on the right. As of 2021, posts on Gab are limited to 5,000 characters.

In early 2017, the option to downvote posts was temporarily removed from Gab, with the company's then-COO Sanduja explaining that they were removed due to them being used to troll and to harass women, and also stated that: "there were a lot of social justice warriors and members of the far left coming into our site essentially trying to start a brouhaha". In July 2017, Gab implemented a system where people who downvoted others (through spamming) would have their accounts downvoted as well and their ability to leave downvotes would be revoked. As of 2019, Gab uses a scoring system, which allows users with more than 250 points to downvote posts, but users must "spend points" in order to do so.

In 2018, the default profile picture for new users to the site featured NPC Wojak, a meme popular on far-right websites.

A frog named "Gabby" was Gab's logo from 2016 to 2018. The logo has been compared to Pepe the Frog, a cartoon character used by the alt-right. Torba denied that the frog logo was a reference to Pepe and stated that the logo was inspired by Bible verses (Exodus 8:1–12 and Psalms 78:45) and various other traditional symbolic meanings. Sanduja said that the frog was meant to symbolize the "revenge against those who went against mainstream conservative voices on the internet". As of September 2018, the frog logo is no longer used.

== See also ==
- List of social networking websites
- 8chan
- DLive
- Frank (social network)
- Minds
- Parler
- Voat
