= Pixartprinting =

Italian online printing company

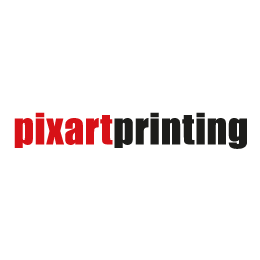
- Industry: E-commerce
- Founded: 1994
- Founder: Matteo Rigamonti
- Headquarters: Quarto d'Altino, Italy
- Key people: Paolo Roatta
- Number of employees: 1,200
- Parent: Cimpress (2014–present)
- Website: www.pixartprinting.it

Pixartprinting is an Italian online printing company based in Quarto d'Altino, in the Metropolitan City of Venice. Founded in 1994 as a conventional printing business, it began accepting orders online in 2000. It has been a subsidiary of Cimpress since 2014.

== History ==
Pixartprinting was founded in 1994 by Matteo Rigamonti in Marghera, near Venice, as a conventional printing business. In 2000, it began taking orders for printed materials through its website.

The Italian private equity fund Alcedo acquired a 75% stake in Pixartprinting in 2011. Pixartprinting subsequently added label and packaging printing to its services.

In 2014, Alcedo sold a 97% in Pixartprinting to Vistaprint, which later became part of Cimpress. By 2016, Paolo Roatta succeeded Alessandro Tenderini as chief executive officer.

The company launched Gifta, a consumer website selling personalised photo products, in 2021. The next year, Pixartprinting adopted hybrid working for its office staff. A supplementary agreement signed with trade unions that October included additional leave for employees with children. Pixartprinting announced its first production facility in the United States in September 2025. Located in Pittsburgh, Pennsylvania, the site had approximately 30 employees at the time. According to the company, the investment exceeded €20 million.

== Operations ==
Pixartprinting prints marketing materials, publications, stickers and labels, packaging, displays and promotional items. Customers choose product specifications and upload print files through the company's website. As of 2020, it sold in twelve European countries: Italy, France, Spain, the United Kingdom, Ireland, Portugal, Germany, Switzerland, Austria, Belgium, the Netherlands and Sweden. By 2025, it also sold in the United States.

Its main European production site is at its headquarters in Quarto d'Altino, with a second Italian plant in Lavis. It also has facilities in France and Tunisia, a software development unit in India, and, since 2025, a production site in Pittsburgh. IIts printing equipment has included digital and offset presses manufactured by HP, Komori, Canon, Durst and Heidelberg. In 2023, Pixartprinting reported revenue of €226 million, an increase of 16% from the previous year, and EBITDA of nearly €37 million. For the financial year ending in June 2024, it reported revenue of €232 million and net profit of €32 million.
