= Webs (web hosting) =

Freemium Web hosting and website building service

- Company type: Subsidiary
- Website type: Web hosting
- Available in: English
- Founded: 2001; 25 years ago
- Dissolved: August 31, 2023
- Successor: Vista x Wix
- Headquarters: Silver Spring, Maryland, USA
- Owner: Cimpress
- Founders: Haroon Mokhtarzada; Zeki Mokhtarzada; Idris Mokhtarzada
- Services: Web hosting service
- Employees: 0
- Parent: Vistaprint
- Divisions: Pagemodo; ContactMe
- Website: www.webs.com (Dead link)
- Launched: 2001; 25 years ago (as Freewebs)
- Current status: Defunct

Webs, formerly Freewebs, was a freemium, primarily static site-only web host founded in 2001 and active until 2023. The service offered free and premium website hosting plans, and its own templated website building service. Webs did not offer any dynamic content support aside from its own dynamic apps, despite offering FTP access and allowing HTML uploads.

== History ==
Webs began in 2001 as Freewebs just after the dot-com bubble. It was a start-up launched by brothers Haroon and Zeki Mokhtarzada during their last year at the University of Maryland, College Park with the help of their younger brother Idris. Their goal was to enable anyone in the world to express themselves through the creation of their own website. Between 2003 and 2007, the company grew 1704%.

By April 2007, the site recorded 18 million unique visitors a month.

On November 14, 2008, Freewebs changed its name to Webs, but users' URLs remained in the freewebs.com domain unless they chose to change over. Now, new websites are given subdomains of webs.com, but the old freewebs.com/sitename format still works, even for new websites. Users can also upgrade to a premium package and receive a custom web address without a Webs subdomain.

On December 28, 2011, the online printing service Vistaprint completed its acquisition of Webs for $117.5 million.

On June 4, 2012, Webs released a new version of their Sitebuilder product, called Sitebuilder3. The new version includes a new drag and drop interface, more customizable themes, and simple social media integration.

In early 2013, Webs underwent a redesign of the internal site, which overhauled the user’s building experience. It involved the removal of ads, the modernization of the user interface, and the addition of a step-by-step “successful website” checklist.

On May 3, 2013, Webs introduced a SEO Booster, a search engine optimization tool that helps users identify the best keyword phrases to build into their website in order to improve its position in search engine results.

In late 2020, the parent company, Vistaprint, announced that on March 31, 2021 all the paying websites hosted by webs.com will be migrated to the Vistaprint domain and all the free websites deleted, with their owners' accounts removed. This change was postponed to June 30, 2021. The last free subdomains were finally shut down on August 31, 2023, with all existing domains transferred to ExactHosting.com.

== Product ==
Webs offered a "drag-and-drop" interface and professional-looking themes for users creating a new website. For pro-level websites, there were additional e-commerce features. including unlimited "webstore" items, and Google and Facebook advertising credits. All users could also link their websites to social media sites such as Twitter and Facebook.

Webs offered its own themes and site builder, as well as a selection of its own dynamic "apps" such as a blog, photo gallery, or webstore.

Free websites were limited in features and also had a Webs banner on the bottom of the screen. The company offered premium plans with more tools and features and also allowed customers to buy custom domain names.

Webs offered 80% uptime guarantee, after many customers had complained about excessive downtime.
