= VistaCreate =

Online graphic design platform

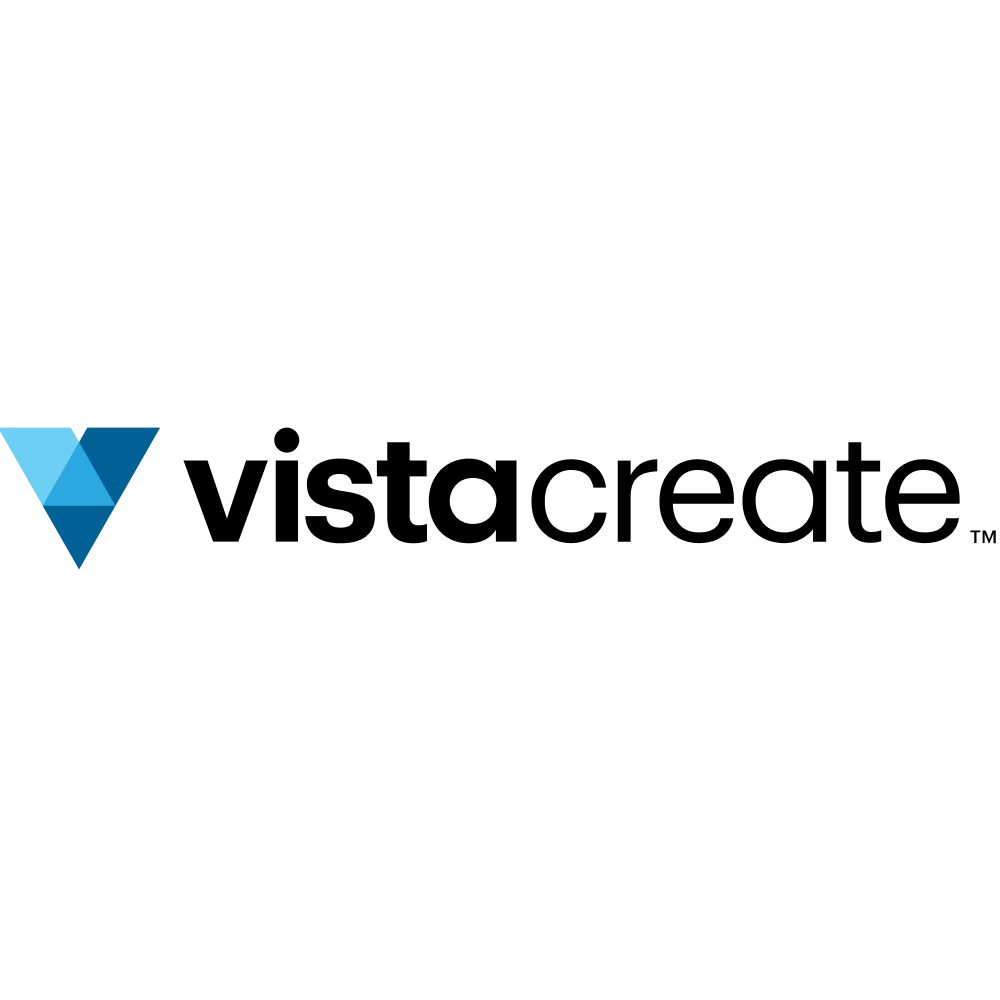
- Website type: Online graphic design platform
- Available in: 17 languages
- Founded: 2016; 10 years ago in Kyiv, Ukraine
- Headquarters: Limassol, Cyprus
- Area served: Worldwide
- Founder: Dmitry Sergeev
- Industry: Graphic design, software, editing
- Parent: VistaPrint
- Subsidiaries: Depositphotos; Lightfield Productions
- Website: create.vista.com
- Commercial: Yes
- Registration: Required
- Current status: Active

VistaCreate (formerly Crello) is a freemium online graphic design platform used by businesses and individual creators to generate static, video, and animated visual content for digital marketing and print media. The service was developed by DepositPhotos and launched as Crello in 2016.

It was rebranded as VistaCreate after VistaPrint acquired DepositPhotos and a related group of companies in 2021.

== Overview ==
VistaCreate was developed by DepositPhotos and launched under the name Crello in 2016 as a browser-based design editor for users without professional design skills. The product offered ready-made templates, design objects, animation tools, and access to stock visual content. In 2019, VistaCreate reported more than one million registered users and launched mobile applications for iOS and Android. In May 2021, Moufflons Basketball collaborated with VistaCreate on a poster design competition focused on gender equality in sports.

In October 2021, Vistaprint acquired Crello and its parent company, Depositphotos, for a total price of $85 million. After the acquisition, Crello was rebranded to VistaCreate. Along with Vistaprint and 99designs, it became part of the new Vista parent brand.

After Russia started a full-scale war on the territory of Ukraine in February 2022, VistaCreate suspended all business in Russia and Belarus. The platform published design templates related to supporting Ukraine, while DepositPhotos made free image collections documenting the war in Ukraine and global rallies in support of Ukrainians available inside the VistaCreate editor. The collections were intended to help media organizations, businesses, and individuals share accurate visual information about the war and counter misinformation.

In 2022, VistaCreate partnered with TrendHunter on a report about social media trends for businesses. The same year, it published The Great Resignation Report, a research project about workers leaving jobs and changing career priorities.

In 2023, VistaCreate and Content Marketing Institute published research on visual marketing and social media content. The same year, VistaCreate collaborated with digital marketer Neil Patel on a contest for small businesses and creators.

In 2025, VistaCreate started adding AI-based tools to its editor, including AI Image Generator, AI Object Remover, and AI Writer.

== Products and services ==
VistaCreate is an online graphic design platform whose main product is a browser-based editor for creating and editing visual content for digital and print use, including social media graphics, videos, logos, advertisements, presentations, animations, and other marketing assets, supported by templates, design objects, stock photos and videos, file-conversion tools, and AI-powered features for image generation, object removal, and text writing. It is offered through a free Starter plan and a paid Pro plan, alongside an API suite that lets businesses integrate its editor, stock content, and AI tools into their own products, and access programs through which eligible nonprofit and educational organizations may apply for the Pro plan.
