= Depositphotos =

American company

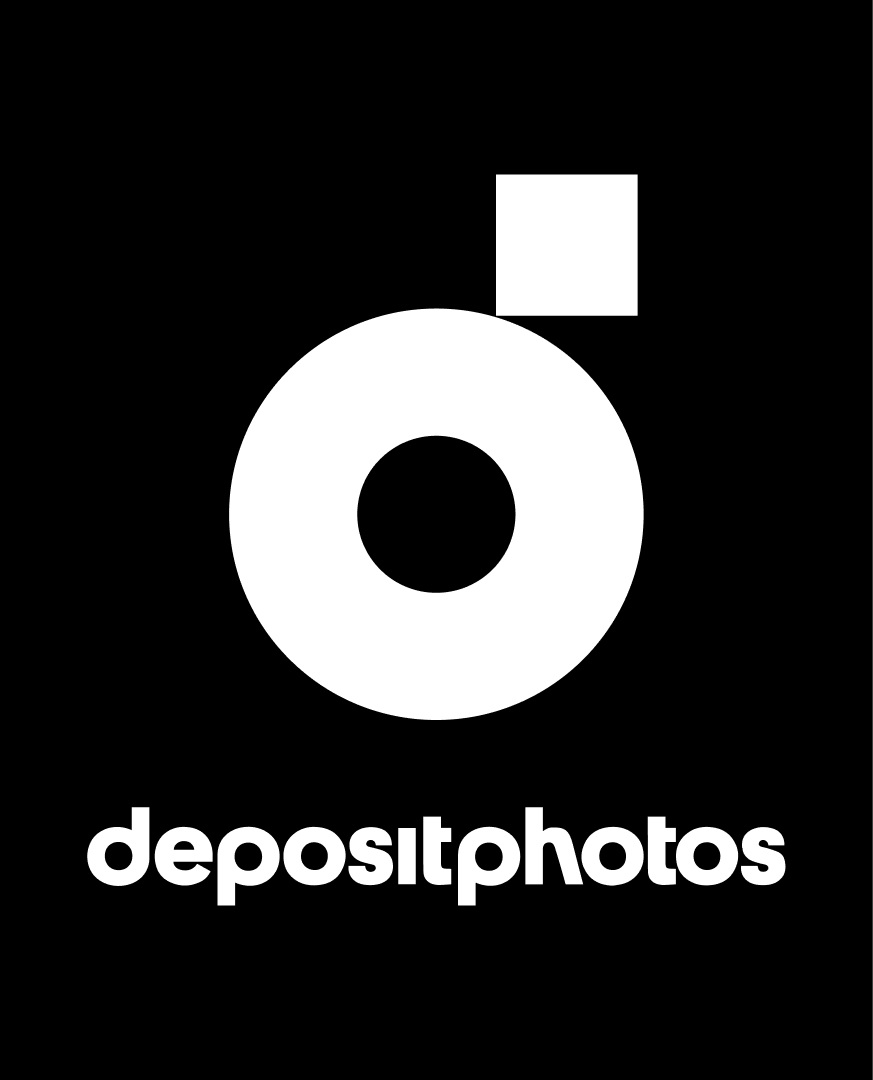
- Company type: Private
- Website type: Licensed content and creative tools platform
- Available in: 29 languages
- Founded: November 4, 2009; 16 years ago in Kyiv, Ukraine
- Headquarters: Waltham, Massachusetts, USA
- Area served: Worldwide
- Founder: Dmitry Sergeev
- Industry: Stock photography; Stock footage; Stock illustration; Stock music; Sound effects; Clip art; PNG; Data set; API
- Parent: Vistaprint (2021—present)
- Subsidiaries: VistaCreate (ex Crello); Lightfield Productions
- Website: depositphotos.com
- Commercial: Yes
- Registration: Required
- Current status: Active

DepositPhotos is a global licensed-content and creative tools platform that provides royalty-free images, videos, and audio files for individual users, brands, agencies, and technology companies. In addition to its stock content marketplace, the company offers enterprise licensing, API solutions, datasets for AI training, and AI-powered tools for generating and editing visuals. The company was founded by Dmitry Sergeev in 2009 in Kyiv, Ukraine and is headquartered in the United States. In 2021, DepositPhotos was acquired by VistaPrint and is part of a creative ecosystem alongside VistaCreate and 99designs by Vista.

The DepositPhotos library exceeded 10 million files in less than four years after the company was founded. As of March 2021, it contained more than 200 million royalty-free photos, vector images, video clips, and editorial files.

As of 2026, the DepositPhotos library includes more than 335 million royalty-free files and works with more than 100,000 contributors.

== History ==
DepositPhotos was founded in November 2009 by Dmitry Sergeev. In 2011, DepositPhotos received $3 million in Series A funding from AIM-listed TMT investments.

In 2012, DepositPhotos began accepting video submissions, added editorial images to its library, and exceeded 10 million files.

In 2013, DepositPhotos library reached 20 million files, and the company registered its one-millionth client. In 2015, DepositPhotos received additional investment from the European Bank for Reconstruction and Development and TMT Investments. In 2016, the company launched Enterprise Solution, a service for corporate clients and team-based content licensing.

In 2017, DepositPhotos launched VistaCreate (ex Crello), an online graphic design tool editor for creating visual materials with ready-made templates. The same year, the company opened Lightfield Productions, the large photography studio in Kyiv, Ukraine.

The DepositPhotos library celebrated 100 million files in 2019. By March 2021, it contained more than 200 million royalty-free photos, vector images, video clips, and editorial files.

In October 2021, VistaPrint acquired DepositPhotos, VistaCreate, Lightfield Productions, and a related group of companies for $85 million. DepositPhotos became part of VistaPrint’s broader creative ecosystem for design, print, and digital services.

In 2022, following international sanctions, DepositPhotos stopped sales and halted services for clients and partners in the Russian Federation and the Republic of Belarus. The same year, the company introduced a Referral Program.

In 2022 and 2023, Creative Trends, DepositPhotos’ annual visual trends project, received a Red Dot Award in the Brands & Communication Design category for the second consecutive year.

In 2024, the DepositPhotos library reached 335 million files. The company introduced a commercially safe AI Image Generator and an API Suite for integrating the VistaCreate design editor, stock content library, and AI-powered tools into third-party products.

In 2025, DepositPhotos expanded into licensed datasets for AI model training, launched AI Editor, and introduced reference-based image generation. The same year, the company updated its brand name and logo, rebranding as DepositPhotos by VistaPrint.

In 2026, DepositPhotos introduced AI Assistant, a tool that combines conversational search, AI image generation, and image editing in one workspace.

== Products and services ==
DepositPhotos provides stock content licensing, enterprise services, AI tools, API solutions, AI training datasets, and a contributor platform. The company licenses royalty-free photographs, illustrations, vectors, PNG files, videos, music, and sound effects through subscriptions, on-demand purchases, business plans, and enterprise agreements. It also offers enterprise licensing services, including team accounts, license management, invoicing, and account support.

The company develops AI-based tools for image generation and editing, including an AI Image Generator, AI Assistant, and editing features such as background removal, object removal, image resizing, background extension, and image upscaling. It also licenses image, video, audio, template, and metadata datasets for artificial intelligence training and research.

DepositPhotos provides an API that enables businesses to integrate its stock content and creative tools into their own applications. The company also operates a contributor program for photographers, illustrators, videographers, and music creators who upload content to the platform under its contributor requirements.

== Brands ==
=== Lightfield Productions ===
In 2017, DepositPhotos opened Lightfield Productions, the largest photography studio in Eastern Europe to help form a community of photographers in Ukraine. The studio is also functioning as an educational center and a platform for events.

=== VistaCreate ===
VistaCreate, formerly Crello, is an online graphic design platform launched by DepositPhotos in 2016.

== Events and projects ==
In 2018 and 2019, DepositPhotos hosted Social Media Week Kyiv as a part of the worldwide Social Media Week network taking place annually in major global cities.

In 2019, DepositPhotos launched Creative Loop, an international event for creators interested in design, advertising, and production.

In 2019, DepositPhotos organized the international festival of creativity OFFF Kyiv and supported the art exhibition Ukraine WOW.

DepositPhotos publishes Creative Trends, an annual report analyzing visual and creative industry trends based on platform data and expert analysis. Its 2022 and 2023 editions received Red Dot Awards in the Brands & Communication Design category, with the 2022 report developed in collaboration with CREVV. The company continued the publication annually, releasing its 2026 edition under the title The Soft Rebellion.

Following the 2022 Russian invasion of Ukraine, DepositPhotos suspended its business operations in Russia and Belarus. The company also launched free-to-use image collections documenting the conflict and international solidarity protests to provide media organizations with verified visual resources. In 2023, DepositPhotos partnered with Ukraine.ua to provide media assets for Country of Freedom, a video project documenting Ukrainian perspectives during the war.

== See also ==
- Stock photography
- Microstock photography
- Royalty-free
