= Automate Ads =

American advertising technology company

- Company type: Advertising
- Founded: 2011
- Headquarters: Palo Alto, California
- Founders: Andrew Torba (former CEO), Charles Szymanski (former CTO)
- Parent: AdHawk
- Website: www.AutomateAds.com at the Wayback Machine (archived March 8, 2016)
- Native clients on: Facebook, Google

Automate Ads (formerly Kuhcoon) was an American advertising technology company that offered products for running and creating advertising campaigns on Google and Facebook. The company was founded in 2011 and was acquired by AdHawk in October 2017.

== History ==
Kuhcoon was co-founded in 2011 by Andrew Torba and Charles Szymanski, who were college roommates at the time, in Scranton, Pennsylvania. In October 2011, Torba became CEO of the company.

In late 2014, Y Combinator invested in Kuhcoon. In February 2015, the company claimed it was working with over 6,000 advertisers in over 90 different countries, said they would soon launch on Google Adwords, and were also planning on launching on Twitter and Pinterest. Kuhcoon also claimed their focus was on serving small and medium-sized advertising businesses rather than serving big businesses. On June 25, 2015, the company renamed itself to Automate Ads. In August 2016, Torba stepped down as CEO of the company. That same month, Torba co-founded Gab, an alt-tech social networking service known for its far-right user base, with Ekrem Büyükkaya.

On October 18, 2017, AdHawk announced that they had acquired Automate Ads for an undisclosed amount. According to a press release from AdHawk, no employees from Automate Ads would join AdHawk in the acquisition, but the "underlying technology" from Automate Ads would still be acquired. AdHawk also agreed to consult CTO Szymanski to help integrate Automate Ads' technology into AdHawk's advertising platform. AdHawk was planning on fully integrating their platform with Automate Ads' platform in the first quarter of 2018. According to The New Republic, prior to the acquisition, Automate Ads "nearly shut down". As of August 2021, AdHawk is part of a network of websites on a "mission to transform the way flooring is bought and sold."
