= Shipyourenemiesglitter.com =

Australian online company

Ship Your Enemies Glitter
- Founded: January 2015
- Country of origin: Australia
- Founder: Mathew Carpenter
- Website: shipyourenemiesglitter.com

shipyourenemiesglitter.com is an online business set up in early January 2015. Business was commenced on 12 January 2015 and offers a glitter bombing service by postal mail. The website was started by Sydney-based Australian entrepreneur Mathew Carpenter. It offers to send an envelope packed with glitter to someone that a customer dislikes. The website received significant media coverage, and was described as having received "over 1.3 million visits", being mentioned on internet social media "about 300,000 times on Facebook and Twitter within its first 24 hours". Carpenter described himself as "somewhat overwhelmed" by the interest and removed ability to order glitter after receiving "thousands" of requests from people wanting to purchase the product.

Later that month the shipyourenemiesglitter.com website was put up for sale on the domain auction website Flippa, Carpenter saying "Please stop buying this horrible glitter product — I'm sick of dealing with it." Writing in response to the sale, Fairfax Media newspaper The Age wondered whether the reference to "tonnes of people wanting to order" meant that no envelopes of glitter had in fact ever been posted, Carpenter commenting in an email interview that "the website is only 48 hours old so we don't have any customers you can speak to".

On 22 January 2015, the company was purchased by Peter Boychuk of Buford, Georgia for US$85,000, and under new ownership the company began mailing letters for the first time. Boychuk died on February 18, 2018.
