= SitePoint =

Publisher of books and online courses

SitePoint Pty. Ltd
- Industry: Publishing
- Founder: Matt Mickiewicz and Mark Harbottle
- Headquarters: Melbourne, Australia
- Area served: Worldwide
- Products: Books, courses, websites
- Subsidiaries: Flippa, Learnable
- Website: www.sitepoint.com

SitePoint is a Melbourne-based website, and publisher of books, courses and articles for web developers.

== History ==
SitePoint was founded by Matt Mickiewicz and Mark Harbottle in 1999. The company had its origins in Webmaster-Resources.com, an internet forum Mickiewicz founded as a resource for beginner web developers.

Originally, the company's business model was based on selling advertising and sponsorship. Following the collapse of the Dot-com bubble in 2000, the company looked towards publishing as an alternative source of income. The company's first book, Build Your Own Database Driven Website Using PHP and MySQL, was published that November, based on a popular online tutorial. Originally made available using print on demand, the book went on to sell 20,000 copies. By 2004, the company had published six books, and began distribution through O'Reilly.

The SitePoint Marketplace, a spinoff from the site's existing forums, was launched in 2005 as a forum in which web designers and developers could outsource projects. In 2007, part of the marketplace was spun off as 99designs, an online marketplace for crowdsourced graphic design. In 2011, 99designs received its first outside investment in the form of $35 million in venture capital funding from Accel Partners.

Another SitePoint spinoff, Flippa, launched in 2009 as a dedicated marketplace for buying and selling websites and domain names.

Following the introduction of its own courses, the company launched Learnable in 2010 as a new online learning platform for web developers. Originally designed as a marketplace, it later became the primary outlet for SitePoint's online book and course products. Learnable was later phased out for the simpler SitePoint website. It allowed some courses to remain as paths, but mostly removed the community aspects of it. SitePoint now partners with major book production companies and has SitePoint Premium, a subscription or one-time purchase to get access to their whole library. The learnable.com website now redirects to SitePoint.
