= Amarnath Amarasingam =

Canadian extremism researcher

- Education: Wilfrid Laurier University
- Known for: Diaspora, media studies, radicalization and deradicalization, religion, social movements, societal response, Sri Lanka, Tamils
- Scientific career
- Fields: Extremism
- Workplaces: Wilfrid Laurier University; University of Waterloo; Dalhousie University; Institute for Strategic Dialogue; George Washington University
- Thesis: Pain, Pride, and Politics: Social Movement Activism and the Sri Lankan Tamil Diaspora in Canada (2013)
- Doctoral advisor: Lorne L. Dawson
- Website: https://cchs.gwu.edu/amarnath-amarasingam

Amarnath Amarasingam is a Canadian extremism researcher.

== Career ==
Amarasingam studied religion and culture at Wilfrid Laurier University from 2007 to 2011. Since September 2011 he teaches as a lecturer at Wilfrid Laurier University, since January 2012 additionally at the University of Waterloo. 2013 he was awarded a PhD with a thesis on social movement activism, his doctoral advisor was Lorne L. Dawson. From May 2014 to May 2016, he conducted research with a grant from the Social Sciences and Humanities Research Council as a postdoctoral fellow at Dalhousie University. He is a senior research fellow at the London Institute for Strategic Dialogue, a fellow in the George Washington University Center for Cyber and Homeland Security extremism program and since January 2017 directs a study on Western Foreign Fighters at the University of Waterloo.

Amarasingam has written for The New York Times, Politico, The Atlantic, Vice News, The Daily Beast, Foreign Affairs, The Huffington Post, Al Jazeera and War on the Rocks. 2016 he participated in the TV-documentation ISIS: Rise of Terror.

== Books ==
- Pain, Pride, and Politics: Social Movement Activism and the Sri Lankan Tamil Diaspora in Canada. (Thesis) University of Georgia Press 2015 ISBN 978-0-820-34812-4
- Sri Lanka: The Struggle for Peace in the Aftermath of War. C. Hurst & Co. 2017 ISBN 978-1-849-04573-5
- The Stewart/Colbert Effect: Essays on the Real Impacts of Fake News. McFarland & Company 2011 ISBN 978-0-786-45886-8
- Religion and the New Atheism: A Critical Appraisal. Brill Publishers 2010 ISBN 978-90-04-18557-9; Haymarket Books 2012 ISBN 978-1-608-46203-2
