= Andrew Torba =

American entrepreneur, and founder and CEO of Gab.com

- Citizenship: United States
- Education: University of Scranton
- Occupations: Former CEO, Automate Ads; CEO, Gab
- Years active: 2011–present
- Spouse: Emily Torba

Andrew Torba is an American businessman and self-described conservative Christian. He is best known for being the founder and CEO of Gab, a social media platform established as an alternative to mainstream sites and that became a haven for users banned from other platforms. Torba is also an author who has written multiple children's books and co-authored the book Christian Nationalism: A Biblical Guide to Taking Dominion and Discipling Nations.

== Early life ==
Andrew Torba grew up in northeastern Pennsylvania, the son of a FedEx courier. He attended the University of Scranton, where he studied philosophy and entrepreneurship. He wrote for the college newspaper where he criticized then-President Barack Obama.

== Career ==
Along with Charles Szymanski, Torba co-founded his first startup, Kuhcoon (aka Automate Ads), in 2011 out of his home in Scranton, Pennsylvania. The company helped run ads on Facebook. In 2014, they won a competition which resulted in the company being accepted into Y Combinator, a Silicon Valley incubator. Torba and Szymanski moved to Palo Alto in Northern California expecting access to upwards of $100,000 in capital and connections to potential investors.

According to the Washington Post, anonymous associates from his time at Y Combinator described Torba and his friend as "mild-mannered and largely unremarkable". They also reported that Torba believed he did not fit in with the culture of Silicon Valley due to his politics and his vocal support of Donald Trump. He was quoted as saying, "I became incredibly disillusioned after only one year living and working with some of the 'top names' and companies," and added, "These are not good people." Kuhcoon was renamed Automate Ads, and failed by mid-2016.

Torba left California and moved to Austin, Texas, stating he no longer felt safe being a conservative in Silicon Valley and that he had been facing backlash for months over posts made on Twitter.

=== Gab ===
In August 2016, at the age of 25, Torba founded Gab. The timing corresponded with the 2016 presidential candidacy of Donald Trump. Torba told The Washington Post he was motivated to create a forum that wasn't controlled by the "progressive leaders" in Silicon Valley. Unlike the majority of platforms at the time, Gab allowed users to mute or block accounts rather than having moderators remove the content, regardless of whether it contained harassment or misinformation.

In November 2016, Andrew Torba was expelled from Y Combinator for violating its policy on harassment. According to Torba, it was because he was a conservative and a Trump supporter. The Washington Post reported that his removal followed clashes with other Y Combinator alumni on Facebook and Twitter, where he had called other community members "cucks" among other posts that were considered offensive. He had shared an image of a fellow alum's tweet citing concern for the safety of minorities in the wake of Trump's first election, in which Torba replied, "Build a wall." In a statement made to BuzzFeed News, a Y Combinator partner confirmed he was removed "for speaking in a threatening, harassing way toward other YC founders."

Within a year of the launch of Gab, Torba was meeting with right-wing figures such as Milo Yiannopoulous of Breitbart and Andrew Anglin of the Daily Stormer. He had appeared on Infowars and Tucker Carlson's show on Fox News. By October 2017, Gab had signed an estimated 290,000 users. Bloomberg reported that Torba initially disagreed with the press calling the platform alt-right and made an effort to publicly distanced himself from its most extreme content. He refused to ban users that called right-wing author and user Theodore Beale a pedophile after Beale emailed in a request, but later defended banning Andrew Auernheimer (aka Weev) for what was determined to violate the site's term against terrorist threats. Some users criticized the ban citing that it went against the platform's premise of "free speech".

By late 2018, Gab had reached approximately 465,000 users and had gained the reputation of a social media site for those banned from Twitter and Facebook. In August of that year, Torba posted "Free speech means you can offend, criticize, and make memes about any race, religion, ethnicity, or sexual orientation. Sick and tired of the double standards for 'acceptable speech' and 'protected classes' on both the left and the right." Gab was reported to have attracted white supremacists and neo-Nazis because their hate speech was allowed to stay on the platform, unlike on other sites. The site was also reported to have attracted prominent extremist figures like Richard Spencer, Christopher Cantwell, and Jared Taylor, as well as organizations such as Patriot Front and Identity Evropa. Politico compared the growth of far-right communities on Gab to the growth of ISIS on social media. The site attracted widespread media attention when one of its users, Robert Bowers, posted on the site shortly before murdering 11 people at the Tree of Life Synagogue in Pittsburgh.

After the shooting, Gab was banned from its hosting sites, payment processors, and app stores. Torba defended the site's policies stating Bowers's post didn't read like a threat, but also condemned the shooting. Staff, including the head engineer, left the company. Coinbase, an American cryptocurrency exchange, banned Torba's personal account in January 2019. Square's Cash App followed suit shortly after. CNN reported Torba to have stated, "It disgusted me," and he was "horrified to find out that this alleged terrorist was on our site." In an interview with NPR, Torba defended the site's policies and stated, "We're not going anywhere."

In 2021, during the COVID-19 pandemic, Torba had positioned Gab to be an alt-tech alternative to Facebook and Twitter, telling readers, "It's time to build our own economy." The New York Times credited Torba with spreading a rumor regarding the court-martialing of active duty service members if they refused the vaccine. According to the New York Times, his post was followed by documents Torba shared containing false claims about how to request vaccine exemption.

On August 19, 2022, the House Oversight Committee sent a letter addressed to Torba regarding threats directed at federal law enforcement that had been posted on Gab following the FBI search of Donald Trump's Mar-a-Lago property. The letter stated, "The Committee is seeking to understand how your company responds when users post threats against law enforcement, how your company plans to prevent your platform from being used to incite violence against law enforcement personnel, and whether legislative reform is necessary to protect law enforcement personnel and increase coordination with federal authorities." Similar letters were sent to executives of other social media platforms, including Meta, Twitter, and Truth Social. Researchers cited by Business Insider found mentions of "civil war" and violent rhetoric to have increased by 106%. Torba's response to inquiries from the Washington Post directed them to a blog post where he pointed out past cooperation with law enforcement and that the platform was considering its response to the committee.

=== Christian nationalism ===
Torba has described the time immediately following the Pittsburgh shooting as when he became more deeply involved with Christianity because he struggled in the aftermath due to the perpetrator's use of his platform. In September 2021, Torba announced an update to Gab's infrastructure with the stated intention of creating a "parallel Christian Society" online. By this time he'd returned to Pennsylvania.

In September 2022, Torba and Andrew Isker co-authored a book titled Christian Nationalism: A Biblical Guide for Taking Dominion and Discipling Nations. The book had reached 12th on Amazon's best seller list the week following its release. Within a month, it had a 4.7 rating with over 700 reviews. Business Insider reported that, in the book, Torba and Isker criticize American society's acceptance of the LGBTQ and legal abortions. It also gives readers instructions on how to convince others to join the religion. It states that the ideal Christian nation would be led by Christians and governed based on Christian principles, and that their world view is "a threat to all other false worldviews."

=== Antisemitism ===
Torba has denied being an antisemite, according to the Anti-Defamation League, who has reported instances where Torba has shared antisemitic material through both his personal and Gab's verified Twitter account. The posts reportedly included language used by Nazi's in the 1930's blaming Jews for the Russian Revolution, as well as others referencing the Crucifixion and the Talmud. According to the Combat Antisemitism Movement, Torba is a "vocal proponent of the Great Replacement Theory." The Times of Israel quoted Torba as having said "You represent 2% of the country, ok? We're not bending the knee to the 2% anymore." on Gab TV.

The AZ Mirror described Torba as a "prominent anti-semite" following his endorsement of conservative candidates in the 2022 election. Two of the candidates said they were "honored" to receive his endorsement. Gubernatorial candidate Kari Lake's campaign rejected it.

== Personal life ==
Andrew Torba is married to Emily Torba. They have two children.

== Books ==
- Christian Nationalism: A Biblical Guide for Taking Dominion and Discipling Nations – Co-Authored with Andrew Isker – Published Sep 9, 2022 – ISBN 979-8353628224
- Reclaiming Reality: Restoring Humanity in the Age of AI – Published Feb 13, 2025 – ISBN 979-8310248731
- Ginger the Giraffe: (Who Wanted to Be a Horse) – Published September 20, 2024 – ISBN 979-8339858959
- Button: A Christmas Story – Published Dec 1, 2024 – ISBN 979-8301901393
- The Paper Crown – Published Oct 22, 2024 – ISBN 979-8343245653
