= Flippa =

Marketplace for purchasing online businesses

Flippa.com Pty Ltd
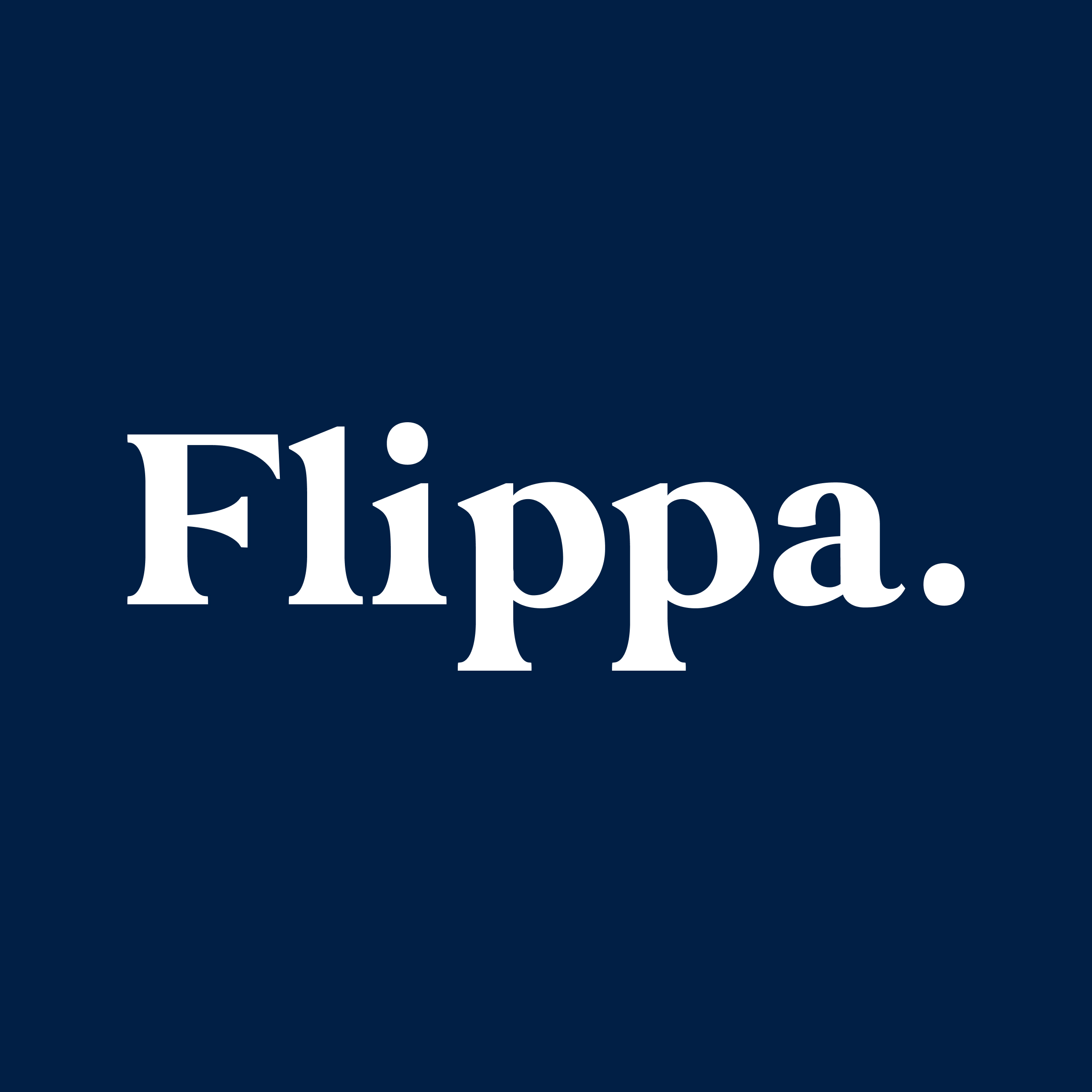
- Website type: Private
- Founded: 2009; 17 years ago
- Headquarters: Melbourne, Australia, and Austin, Texas, U.S.
- No. of locations: Austin, Portland, Barcelona, São Paulo, Copenhagen, Moscow, Hamburg, Berlin, Milan, Toronto
- Founders: Mark Harbottle; Matt Mickiewicz
- Key people: Matt Mickiewicz, Founder; Mark Harbottle, Founder; Blake Hutchison, CEO
- Industry: Internet
- Services: Marketplace for buying and selling online businesses
- Website: Flippa.com
- Native clients on: iOS, Android, Windows

Flippa is an online marketplace for buying and selling digital assets and businesses, including Software as a Service (SaaS), eCommerce stores, and mobile applications, based in Melbourne, Australia, and Austin, Texas, United States, Amsterdam, Netherlands, and Singapore, Singapore. Flippa offers support from over 50 business brokers around the world. The platform serves over 1.6 million registered users and facilitates transactions ranging from $10,000 to $30,000,000. It was founded in June 2009 by Mark Harbottle and Matt Mickiewicz.

== History ==
Flippa was founded by Mark Harbottle and Matt Mickiewicz as the SitePoint Marketplace, and was spun off as a separate website in June 2009. By 2015, it had traded more than $140 million in websites, domains, SaaS businesses, content sites mobile apps, and other digital assets.

In 2026, Flippa has reported trading hundreds-of-millions in digital assets.

The majority of Flippa's revenue comes from selling online businesses including content sites, SaaS businesses, ecommerce businesses, apps, digital services, marketplaces and more.

The most expensive sale to date was a portfolio of Singapore-based apps, which sold for US$35,000,000. The most expensive domain name sold was planetrx.com, selling for US$1,200,000.

== Notable transactions ==
The majority of Flippa's revenue is derived from the sale of online businesses. Flippa's largest sale to date, was a portfolio of Singapore-based apps for US$35,000,000.

Other notable websites and domains sold through Flippa have included Mark Zuckerberg's former website Facemash, overnight success story shipyourenemiesglitter.com, Retweet.com, and AllAboutCookies.org.

During the 2012 US presidential election, the domain name RomneyRyan.com was listed on Flippa. It reached US$8,050 in bids, but did not sell. It dropped in price the next year and was eventually sold through GoDaddy for US$235.00.

In May 2015, Flippa bought Domain Holdings, a domain name brokerage firm based in Florida.

On August 27, 2015, Potato Parcel was sold on Flippa for US$42,000. A few months earlier, the viral website shipyourenemiesglitter.com from creator Matthew Carpentor sold for US$85,000.

== Fundraising ==
On September 20, 2021, Flippa announced a US$11,000,000 Series A capital raise led by Sydney-based venture capital firm OneVentures.

On March 16, 2022, after acquiring Richard Patey's Alts Cafe, Flippa announced the launch of ALTS by Flippa, an alternative asset investing newsletter and Discord community. Written by Richard Patey, the newsletter shines light on "alternative investing opportunities, from online business to crypto & NFTs". As of November 2022, its Discord community boasts over 2000 members.

On December 19, 2023, Flippa acquired BitsForDigits.com, a Berlin-based competitor founded by Laurits Just and Jan-Philipp Peters. With the acquisition, Flippa announced that it would enable them to continue expanding their scope upwards for M&A deals in the 8-figure range, particularly in the SaaS category and European region. BitsForDigits' co-founder and CEO, Laurits Just, joined the company as an Entrepreneur-In-Residence to develop new business, including Flippa Invest.

== Technology and services ==
In 2025, Flippa transitioned toward an AI-first infrastructure with the launch of BrokerAI, first launching with an off-market deal sourcing engine and AI Translations. This suite of tools automates various phases of the M&A lifecycle, including:

- Deal Intelligence: AI-powered buyer matching, demand forecasting, and automated buyer scoring.
- Documentation: Automated P&L builders, Information Memorandum (IM) generation, and data room management.
- Operations: Integrated verification, onboarding, and off-market deal sourcing.

The platform operates as a hybrid marketplace, combining self-service listing tools with a curated network of expert brokers who specialize in high-value digital assets, located.

=== Historically Significant Sales ===
- Facemash: Mark Zuckerberg’s former website.
- Planetrx.com: Sold for $1.2 million.
- ShipYourEnemiesGlitter.com: A viral website sold for $85,000 in 2015.
- Potato Parcel: Sold for $42,000 following its appearance on Shark Tank.

Other notable sales include: Retweet.com, and AllAboutCookies.org.

=== Recent High-Value Deals (2024–2026) ===
Recent data indicates a shift toward high-margin SaaS and diversified digital assets:

- B2B Education Community: Sold for $4.2 million (2025).
- Premium Baby Fashion Brand: Sold for $3.32 million (2025).
- Automotive eCommerce Store: Sold for $2.2 million (2025).
- Google Ads Intelligence SaaS: Sold for $1.3 million (2024).
- Android Gallery App: Seven-figure exit ($1.25 million).
- AI EdTech App: Sold for $575,000 with over 2.5 million users (2025).

== Business model ==
Flippa targets the "99% of businesses" often ignored by traditional investment banks and M&A firms, focusing on the $10K to $10M range. The ecosystem includes integrated legal services, insurance, and financing to support both first-time buyers and institutional investors. As of 2025, the platform reports approximately 400,000 weekly active buyers.
