= Potato Parcel =

American company

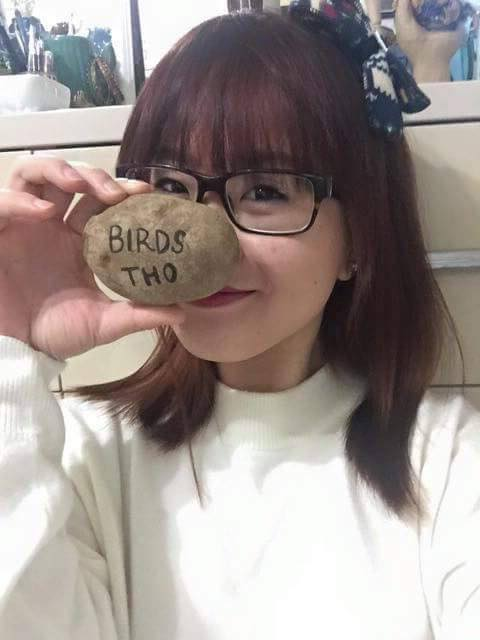
A selfie with a Potato Parcel message reading "Birds Tho".

Potato Parcel (or PotatoParcel.com) is an American company that delivers potatoes with personalized messages of up to 140 characters or one picture.

== History ==
In May 2015, Potato Parcel was founded by mobile app developer Alex Craig, a 24-year-old University of North Texas alumnus, and was later promoted on Reddit. Originally, Potato Parcel was based in Dallas, Texas. Craig said he would buy the potatoes from the local neighborhood Walmart. Reportedly, profits per month ranged between $10,000 and $13,000. Potato Parcel proved popular on websites like Twitter. In an email interview with MarketWatch's Kathleen Burke, Craig said "I wanted to create a brand new way of sending a message outside of apps and technology by allowing anyone to send an anonymous message…on a potato."

In October 2015, Potato Parcel was sold to Bay Area entrepreneur Riad Bekhit for $40,000 and moved to San Bruno, California. Bekhit says he uses a Pilot G2 gel roller pens to write messages. Since the move, new products include Lump of Coal Potato (a potato that is spray-painted black), Potato Pal (a potato with a picture of someone's face), Potato Postcard (a postcard pasted onto a potato), and Spooky Tater (a potato painted to look like a pumpkin). A burlap sack is also available for shipping. In April 2016, Bekhit said profits per month ranged between $20,000 and $25,000. Potato Parcel has expanded shipping to Australia, Canada, Europe, and the United Kingdom.

Potato Parcel also inspired a number of other delivery companies. Another company of the same name based in Australia delivers at the cost of $10 a message of 15 words or fewer. Potato Parcel also inspired Brick or Potato, which allows the customer to choose between a brick or potato with a personalized message at the cost of £6.99. Potato Messenger, started by two art students Will Richards and Daniel Butson, mailed 1,000 potatoes to Parliament House, Canberra painted and arranged as the rainbow flag to protest for marriage equality in Australia. It also inspired Bananas Gone Wild, founded by electrocardiogram technician Davonte Wilson of Plano, Texas, and Nannergram, founded by Konnor Willison and based in Lehi, Utah, which delivers bananas with personalized messages. There is also Eggplant Mail, which delivers eggplants.

== Reception ==
Cosmopolitan's Tess Koman reviewed Potato Parcel with "It's the new glitter-bombing, but way more depressing." Tech Cocktail's Elliot Volkman said "these are the perfect way to tell people exactly how you feel."

== See also ==
- List of Internet phenomena
