= Cimpress =

Irish Company

Cimpress plc
- Formerly: Bonne Impression; (1995–1999); Vistaprint; (1999–2014)
- Type: Public
- Traded as: Nasdaq: CMPR; Russell 2000 Component
- Industry: Mass customization
- Founded: 1995; 31 years ago
- Headquarters: Dundalk, Ireland,
- Key people: Robert S. Keane (chairman & CEO); Sean E. Quinn (CFO)
- Brands: Vistaprint, National Pen, Pixart Printing, WmD, ExaPrint
- Revenue: ▲US$ 3.40 billion; (FY JUN 30 2025)
- Operating income: ▲US$ 226.3 million; (FY JUN 30 2025)
- Net income: ▼US$ 12.9 million; (FY JUN 30 2025)
- Total assets: ▲US$ 1.97 billion; (FY JUN 30 2025)
- Total equity: ▼US$ -583.5 million; (FY JUN 30 2025)
- Number of employees: ~15,000 (full-time); ~900 (temporary); (FY JUN 30 2025)
- Website: cimpress.com

Cimpress plc is an Irish multinational technology company that invests in and operates a wide variety of businesses that use mass customization to configure and produce small quantities of individually customized goods. Those products are sold to small businesses, graphic designers and consumers through a number of customer-facing brands that Cimpress operates.

== Business operations ==
Cimpress is a conglomerate that specializes in mass customization, based in Dundalk, Ireland employing more than 10,000 people globally across manufacturing, marketing, technology, software development, sales and support functions. It has offices and manufacturing facilities throughout Europe, North and South America, India, Australia, Philippines, China and Japan.

Cimpress aggregates, via the Internet, large volumes of small, individually customized orders for a broad spectrum of print, signage, apparel and similar products.

== History ==
The company was founded under the name Bonne Impression in 1995 in Paris, France by current President and CEO Robert Keane. It was a direct marketer of desktop publishing software and pre-printed laser-printer-compatible specialty papers for printing brochures, stationery and business cards from the desktops – focused on small business customers. In 1999, the company moved its business to the internet and changed its name to Vistaprint.

This was followed by its initial public offering in 2005 when it began trading on the Nasdaq under VPRT.

In November 2014, the company changed its name from Vistaprint N.V. to Cimpress N.V. to clarify the distinction between the corporate entity and the company's portfolio of customer-facing brands.

=== Acquisitions ===
Cimpress has acquired several companies that specialize in online printing and mass customization.

In November 2011, Cimpress acquired Albumprinter which it later divested in 2017, a company based in Amsterdam, the Netherlands that produces photobooks and Webs, a company based in Silver Spring, Maryland, that enables users to create free websites.

At the start of 2014, Cimpress announced it had acquired People & Print Group (renamed Printdeal as of January 1, 2015), an online printing company based in Deventer, Netherlands. In April of the same year, the company acquired Pixartprinting, an online printing company based in Quarto d'Altino, Italy. Later that year in October 2014, Vistaprint acquired a $25 million minority position in Brazilian web-printing startup Printi. In 2020, the company acquired a majority stake.

In December 2016, Cimpress acquired National Pen, a marketer and manufacturer of custom writing instruments.

Four years later, in 2018, Cimpress acquired BuildASign, an online printing company based in Austin, Texas for $280 million. BuildASign kept its company name as well as its website. That same year, the company also purchased a majority stake in VIDA & Co., a San Francisco-based company that provides on-demand apparel, accessories, and home decor products.

== Manufacturing ==
Cimpress businesses have manufacturing facilities in North America, South America, Asia, Europe and Australia. In 2016, the company opened its first US manufacturing plant in Reno, Nevada.
