= 99designs =

Australian company

- Website type: Freelance marketplace
- Founded: 2008
- Headquarters: Melbourne, Australia
- Area served: Worldwide
- Owner: 99designs Pty Ltd
- Founders: Matt Mickiewicz, Mark Harbottle
- Key people: Patrick Llewellyn, (CEO)
- Industry: Internet
- Website: 99designs.com
- Current status: Active

99designs is a Melbourne, Australia, based company that operates a freelancer platform for connecting graphic designers and clients. The company was founded in 2008, and has a United States office in Oakland, California.

== History ==
99designs was founded by Matt Mickiewicz and Mark Harbottle as a spin-off of SitePoint, a website started in 1998 as a forum for web developers and designers. Designers on its forums began organizing contests based on fictional client briefs. The founders decided to test charging a fee to post briefs for real projects, eventually creating 99designs as a separate company for the contests.

In 2008, the company opened a San Francisco office because the majority of the platform's initial clients and designers were in the United States. It later moved its U.S. headquarters to Oakland, California. By 2012, the site had 175,000 designers in 192 countries. By 2016, it had about one million registered designers. The platform was later redesigned to allow customers to directly search for and hire designers, outside of design competitions.

In 2012, the company acquired a European competitor called 12designer, based in Germany. Its office became the European headquarters of 99designs. In 2013, the company acquired LogoChef, a Brazilian competitor. In 2017, the company relocated back to Melbourne.

The company was acquired in October 2020 by the American-Irish company Cimpress.

== Financials ==
In 2011, the company received US$35 million in financing from Accel Partners and other investors. It subsequently raised another $10 million in 2015.

The company became profitable in 2017, and in February 2018, it reported $60 million a year in revenue.
