= Lorne L. Dawson =

Canadian sociologist of religion

Lorne L. Dawson is a Canadian scholar of the sociology of religion who has written about new religious movements, the brainwashing controversy, and religion and the Internet. His work is now focused on religious terrorism and the process of radicalization, especially with regard to domestic terrorists.

== Academic career ==
Dawson, who has an Hons. B.A. from Queen's University, and an M.A. and Ph.D. from McMaster University, is a Professor of Sociology and Religious Studies at the University of Waterloo. He was Chair of the Department of Religious Studies at the university (2000-2006) and co-founder and second Director of the Lauier-Waterloo PhD in Religious Studies (2006-2009). From 2011-2015 he was Chair of the Department of Sociology & Legal Studies at the University of Waterloo. He has served on the editorial boards of Method and Theory in the Study of Religion, Sociology of Religion: A Quarterly Review, the journal of the Association for the Sociology of Religion. and "Nova Religio" and "Fieldwork in the Study of Religion."

Dawson has published a large number of scholarly articles on new religious movements, along with books such as Cults in Context (editor, 1998), Comprehending Cults (1998; 2nd ed. 2006), Cults and New Religious Movements: A Reader (2003, editor) and others (e.g., Religion Online, edited with Douglas Cowan, 2004). Dawson expressed the view in 1998 that "In the late 1980s the activity of NRMs tapered off, and membership in the relatively well-established groups like Scientology, Krishna Consciousness, and the Unification Church has stabilized well below levels achieved in the early to mid-seventies", arguing that "fewer new religions are being formed now, and they are attracting fewer followers" – a view that has been contested by other more recent authors perceiving ongoing proliferation of such groups, although they acknowledge that these communities take different forms now to those that were common in the 1970s and 1980s.

Dawson's research has also focused on the significance of new religious movements in modern culture and the role the Internet, with sites such as YouTube, plays in contemporary religion, including religious conflict and hate propaganda: "The antireligion perspective has been around on the Internet since its beginning, though using YouTube to express such thoughts is new. To my mind, it is a very unique scheme. In a sense, it is a new twist on a long habit of trolling, baiting and flaming people online and purposely seeking to attract attention and stir up trouble. It is in line with the culture of the Internet and the bad-boy element of the Internet." Dawson has commented that the semi-anonymous nature of the Internet makes it a medium to voice feelings that would otherwise go unexpressed: "Suppressed, maybe even truly repressed, feelings may be expressed – from anger to love. People simply will say things they would not say otherwise. Rather virulent expressions of ridicule or hatred, for example, are commonly encountered on the Internet. So are statements that would probably be too embarrassing for most of us to say in other kinds of public forums. Ironically, under conditions of technical anonymity, the sociality of the Internet offers an unparalleled opportunity for greater self-disclosure and exploration."

His research and publications have also focused on the nature of charismatic authority and its role in fomenting violence behaviour in some new religious movements, and how groups respond to the failure of prophecy.

His research on why some new religious movements become violent led to work on the process of radicalization in cases of homegrown terrorism (e.g., "The Study of New Religious Movements and the Radicalization of Home-Grown Terrorists: Opening a Dialogue," Terrorism and Political Violence 22, 2010: 1-21). He has done many presentations on religious terrorism and radicalization for groups like the RCMP, CSIS, Public Safety Canada, Defence Research and Development Canada, The Conference Board of Canada, Global Futures Forum, and Homeland Security. He is the Co-Founder and Co-Director of the Canadian Network for Research on Terrorism, Security and Society (www.tsas.ca), which was established in 2012. Since 2010 his research has focused primarily on the study of foreign terrorist fighters, the role of religion in motivating religious terrorism, the social ecology of radicalization, and methodological issues in the study of religious terrorism (see the publications listed below).

== Personal life ==
In a 2007 New York Times article, Dawson self-identified as "an agnostic with a 'Buddhist world view'."

== Books ==
- Terrorism and Counter-Terrorism in Canada, University of Toronto Press 2020, ISBN 978-1-4875-2170-7 (Editor with Jez Littlewood & Sara K. Thompson)
- Religious Radicalization and Securitization in Canada and Beyond, University of Toronto Press 2014, ISBN 978-1-4426-4631-5 (Editor with Paul Bramadat)
- The Sociology of Religion: A Canadian Perspective, (with Joel Thiessen), Oxford University Press 2014, ISBN 978-0-19-542557-4
- Cults and New Religious Movements: A Reader, Wiley-Blackwell 2009, ISBN 978-1-4051-0181-3
- Comprehending Cults: The Sociology of New Religious Movements, Oxford University Press 2006, ISBN 978-0-19-542009-8
- Religion Online: Finding Faith on the Internet, Routledge 2004, ISBN 978-0-415-97022-8 (with Douglas E. Cowan)
- Cults in Context: Readings in the Study of New Religious Movements, Transaction Publishers 1998, ISBN 978-0-7658-0478-5
- Reason, Freedom, and Religion: Closing the Gap between the Humanistic and Scientific Study of Religion, Volume 6 of Toronto Studies in Religion, P. Lang 1988, ISBN 9780820406008
