= Vistaprint =

Online printing and marketing services company

VistaPrint
- Formerly: Bonne Impression
- Type: Subsidiary
- Industry: E-commerce; commercial printing
- Founded: 1995
- Founder: Robert Keane
- Headquarters: Venlo, Netherlands
- Key people: Florian Baumgartner (CEO)
- Products: Custom printing; Marketing materials; Stationery; Signage; Packaging; Promotional merchandise; Photo gifts
- Revenue: 1,820,000,000 United States dollar (2025)
- Parent: Cimpress plc
- Website: https://www.vistaprint.com

VistaPrint is a multinational e-commerce company specializing in customized printing, marketing materials, and digital design services for small businesses. Its products include stationery, signage, packaging, promotional merchandise, and photo products. VistaPrint is a business of Cimpress plc, which reports it as a segment that also includes VistaCreate and 99designs by Vista.

Founded by Robert Keane in Paris in 1995 as Bonne Impression, the business adopted the VistaPrint name and an internet-based printing model in 1999. It subsequently expanded internationally; in 2014, its parent company was renamed Cimpress, with VistaPrint continuing as the operating brand.

VistaPrint operates in several international markets, including North America, Western Europe, and Australia. Its manufacturing operations use automated printing and mass-customization processes to fulfill individually configured orders. In the late 2000s, the company faced consumer complaints and lawsuits over membership rewards programs; the lawsuits were dismissed, and VistaPrint discontinued the programs in 2009.

== History ==
Robert Keane founded a company in Paris in 1995 called Bonne Impression, a direct marketer of desktop publishing software and pre-printed laser-printer-compatible specialty papers for printing brochures, stationery, and business cards, particularly for small businesses. In 1999, the company adopted an internet-based business model and changed its name to Vistaprint.

VistaPrint completed its initial public offering in September 2005 and began trading on the Nasdaq. In September 2006, VistaPrint opened a European marketing office in Barcelona, Spain. In 2009, the company transferred its corporate domicile to the Netherlands, where it had already established manufacturing operations.

In November 2014, VistaPrint announced a corporate reorganization under which its parent company adopted the name Cimpress, while VistaPrint remained the primary operating brand. The company's Nasdaq ticker symbol subsequently changed from VPRT to CMPR.

In November 2016, Cimpress announced that it would be opening a manufacturing facility in Reno, Nevada, to expand its North American production operations.

In August 2018, VistaPrint announced plans to build a manufacturing facility in Dallas, Texas.

In October 2021, Vista's parent company, Cimpress, acquired Depositphotos Inc., including the digital design platform Crello, for approximately US$85 million. Crello was subsequently renamed VistaCreate.

In January 2023, VistaPrint announced that Florian Baumgartner would succeed Robert Keane as chief executive of the business, then operating as Vista, as of February 1, 2023; Keane continued as chief executive of Cimpress.

== Operations ==
VistaPrint operates in North America, Western Europe, Australia, New Zealand, India, and Singapore. Its operations encompass online customization, printing, digital design services, and order fulfillment.

In the fiscal year ending June 30, 2026, Cimpress's VistaPrint business segment reported revenue of approximately US$1.93 billion. The segment includes VistaCreate, 99designs by Vista, a website-building collaboration with Wix, and VistaPrint Corporate Solutions.

=== Products and services ===
VistaPrint initially specialized in business cards before expanding into other customized printed products, including stationery, brochures, flyers, signs, packaging, promotional merchandise, clothing, and photo products. Customers can customize many of these products using online design templates or uploaded artwork.

The company also provides digital design services through VistaCreate and 99designs by Vista, alongside website services provided through collaboration with Wix. Its digital design products include an AI-powered logo maker.

=== Printing and manufacturing ===
VistaPrint has used mass-customization techniques to produce printed materials in relatively small quantities. Customers configure products through online design and ordering systems, after which orders are processed through manufacturing and fulfillment operations.

Trade-press coverage in the 2000s described a production model that incorporated automated workflows and combined similar printing jobs to improve manufacturing efficiency. By 2008, VistaPrint operated production facilities in Windsor, Ontario, and Venlo, Netherlands.

== Patent litigation ==
During the 2000s, VistaPrint was involved in several patent infringement disputes concerning online printing and design technologies.

In 2006, VistaPrint initiated patent infringement proceedings against print24 GmbH and unitedprint.com AG in Germany. A German district court ruled in VistaPrint's favor in 2007. In November 2008, the German Federal Patent Court revoked the patent at issue, issuing its written decision in March 2009. VistaPrint subsequently appealed the ruling to the German Federal Supreme Court. The court upheld the revocation in March 2012.

In May 2007, VistaPrint Technologies Limited filed a patent infringement lawsuit against Taylor Corporation subsidiaries 123Print and Drawing Board, involving patents related to online product design. The proceedings were subsequently stayed pending reexamination of the patents.

== Partnerships ==
In 2007, VistaPrint entered into a partnership with OfficeMax to provide customized printing services through the retailer. The following year, the company announced an arrangement with Intuit to integrate printing services with Intuit's QuickBooks accounting software.

The company subsequently entered into commercial arrangements with FedEx Office in 2009 and Staples in 2011.

VistaPrint served as the Boston Celtics' jersey-patch sponsor from 2020 until 2024.

In 2022, VistaPrint became a sleeve sponsor of Wrexham A.F.C., subsequently expanding the arrangement to include back-of-shirt sponsorship in 2023. In February 2022, Vista announced a partnership with Liverpool F.C. as the club's official small-business design and marketing partner.

In January 2025, VistaPrint entered into a sponsorship agreement with the women's basketball league Unrivaled, becoming a jersey-patch sponsor for Mist Basketball Club and an official printing and design partner of the league.

In 2026, VistaPrint collaborated with Enterprise Nation on a UK small-business grant initiative that awarded six independent retailers £5,000 each.

== Controversies ==
=== Membership rewards programs ===
During the late 2000s, VistaPrint faced consumer complaints and legal proceedings concerning membership rewards programs operated in association with Vertrue and related companies. In the United States, customers complained about recurring membership charges that they alleged had not been adequately authorized. In the United Kingdom, complaints also concerned customers being enrolled in paid membership programs without sufficient notice or understanding of the recurring fees.

In August 2008, four class-action lawsuits were filed alleging that customers had been enrolled in and charged for the membership programs without proper authorization. A federal district court in Texas dismissed the litigation in August 2009, and in 2010 the Fifth Circuit Court of Appeals affirmed the dismissal, finding that VistaPrint's website disclosures were not deceptive.

In November 2009, VistaPrint announced that it would terminate its agreement with a Vertrue affiliate and discontinue membership rewards and similar programs, effective December 20, 2009.

=== Advertising standards rulings ===
Between 2012 and 2017, the United Kingdom’s Advertising Standards Authority upheld complaints about several VistaPrint advertisements that quoted prices excluding VAT, postage, or other non-optional charges, including offers for calendars and postcards (2012), business cards (2013), and flyers (2017).

=== Printing and fulfillment incidents ===
In January 2018, a same-sex couple reported receiving anti-gay religious pamphlets instead of wedding programs they had ordered from VistaPrint. The company attributed the incident to an incorrect shipping label applied by a third-party production partner. The couple subsequently withdrew their lawsuit following an agreement that included an apology and donations to LGBTQ organizations.

In June 2020, customers ordering Black Lives Matter posters reported receiving additional All Lives Matter posters. VistaPrint stated that an investigation identified an automated packaging error that had combined separate customer orders. The customers questioned the explanation.

=== Data exposure ===
In November 2019, security researcher Oliver Hough identified an internet-accessible database containing VistaPrint customer communications. Following inquiries from TechCrunch, the company took the database offline. VistaPrint stated that the exposure affected customers in the United States, the United Kingdom, and Ireland.

== See also ==
- Web-to-print
- Print on demand
