= Looper (soundtrack) =

Looper (Original Motion Picture Soundtrack)

Film score by Nathan Johnson
- Released: October 2, 2012
- Recorded: 2011–2012
- Genres: Experimental; ambient; industrial
- Length: 48:27
- Labels: Cut Narrative; La-La Land
- Producer: Nathan Johnson

Nathan Johnson chronology
| The Day I Saw Your Heart (2011) | Looper (2012) | Don Jon (2013) |

Looper (Original Motion Picture Soundtrack) is the soundtrack accompanying the 2012 film Looper directed by Rian Johnson and starring Joseph Gordon-Levitt, Bruce Willis and Emily Blunt. Rian's cousin brother Nathan Johnson composed the film's score, after doing so for his previous films. The soundtrack was released through Cut Narrative Records on October 2, 2012.

== Development ==
Rian sent the finished script to Nathan after he finished it, though the latter was aware of the film's story when it was originally conceived as a short film and was surprised as it was "so much leaner than other things he's written, with less dialogue". Nathan's musical sensibilities were derived from a melodic and thematic writing perspective. However, both of them wanted the music to be distinctive in comparison with that of their previous films. Despite being a science fiction film, Rian wanted to evoke the elements of an epic score without traditional approach and his excitement on field recordings eventually led Nathan to go to New Orleans where the film was shot and visited the sets to describe the ideas for the score. Eventually, he recorded several sounds from specific objects and sampled together to curate a dystopian feel that the film evokes. He added:

"The thing that's so fun about building samples [...] and it's really the core of what I love about music anyway, is the idea of imperfection. So when you sample something with a field recorder, whether it's a Marxophone or a slamming door or a treadmill, they're all these little imperfections that get built into the sound."

Nathan's friend and fellow musician Ryan Lott was involved in the project to build custom software instruments, and eventually experimented with the sounds he field-recorded. He recalled on recording the sound of an old industrial fan from different angles and turned it into a "melodic fluttering instrument" which he pitched it across the keyboard to provide the film's defining sound; he described it as "very rugged and mechanical, but it also feels strangely emotional and organic". Nathan associated with his core team for the rhythms and orchestrations. Some of the non-traditional instrumentation occurred during the atmospheric and action sequences, while the traditional instrumentation is played during the emotional sequences.

At the tenth anniversary of the film, Nathan was interviewed by Toussaint Egan from Polygon, who cited two of his tracks from the score as his favorite: "A Day in the Life" and "Everything Comes Around". The former accompanied the montage of the young Joe (Gordon-Levitt) going through his day-to-day routine as Looper. Nathan worked with Noah Segan (who played Kid Blue, Joe's rival) to record the hammer, cocking and opening mechanism of his "gat", the specialized prop-revolver the character used, that stood out to him as "a really fun, rhythmic, percussive one." The latter was played during the climactic sequence where Sara (Blunt) is reunited with her son Cid. He described it as "the summary of the score as a whole, with the main theme coming back there played on the celeste".

== Release ==
Looper's original soundtrack was released through Nathan's own record label, Cut Narrative on October 2, 2012. It featured 19 tracks in the version that released for digital download and streaming in iTunes and other MP3 formats, and seven additional tracks that featured in the CD version released through La-La Land Records on 3,000 units. The Texas-based screen-printed poster company Mondo issued the vinyl edition of the soundtrack in double LP on September 23, 2014; the 19-track album being pressed in a 180-gram black colored disc with the package cover designed by Jay Shaw. The cover art consisted of a gold-embossed burlap sack filled with holes blown out of the middle that consisted of the gold bars inside.

== Reception ==
Allison Loring of Film School Rejects summarized "Looper teaches us that the future is based on the past and Johnson has created a score that is not simply devoid of the musical elements we have come to expect, but combines them with new sounds and ideas that draw on those of the past." Rashid Irani of Hindustan Times wrote "the plaintive background music score by the director's brother, Nathan Johnson, contribute to the overall impact." W. Andrew Powell of The Gate wrote "The score by composer Nathan Johnson is profoundly ambient and atmospheric, and thanks to the 'found sound' style of audio that was used, the compositions sound almost like nothing I have heard before."

Ranking the album at fifth on the best film scores of 2012, Ivan Radford of Den of Geek summarized "The fact that it inspires genuine emotion as well as thrilling action is even more brain-spinning than hitting your head on a car door 1,000 times." Soundworks Collection described the score as "the best film score of 2012" in the website's year-ender review.

== Accolades ==
In February 2013, he was awarded as the Breakthrough Composer of the Year by the International Film Music Critics Association for his work in the film.

== Track listing ==
Looper (Original Motion Picture Soundtrack) digital track listing
| No. | Title | Length |
|---|---|---|
| 1. | "A Body That Technically Does Not Exist" | 1:21 |
| 2. | "A Day in the Life" | 1:10 |
| 3. | "Closing Your Loop" | 2:56 |
| 4. | "Seth's Tale" | 2:54 |
| 5. | "Run" | 2:49 |
| 6. | "A Life in the Day" | 2:22 |
| 7. | "Time Machine" | 2:40 |
| 8. | "Hunting The Past" | 2:55 |
| 9. | "Following the Loop" | 1:42 |
| 10. | "Mining for Memories" | 1:54 |
| 11. | "A New Scar" | 2:34 |
| 12. | "Her Face" | 2:37 |
| 13. | "City Sweep" | 0:46 |
| 14. | "Revelations" | 5:12 |
| 15. | "The Rainmaker" | 4:26 |
| 16. | "La Belle Aurora" | 1:01 |
| 17. | "Showdown" | 1:36 |
| 18. | "The Path Was a Circle" | 4:51 |
| 19. | "Everything Comes Around" | 2:41 |
| Total length: | | 48:27 |

CD version extra tracks
| No. | Title | Length |
|---|---|---|
| 20. | "Withdrawals" | 0:32 |
| 21. | "Closing Your Loop" (film mix) | 2:32 |
| 22. | "Hobo Attack" | 1:36 |
| 23. | "Thirty-Two" | 1:24 |
| 24. | "Run" (film mix) | 3:04 |
| 25. | "Comundications/City Sweep" (film mix) | 1:23 |
| 26. | "Theme From Looper" (solo piano version) | 5:28 |
| Total length: | | 64:26 |

== Personnel ==
Credits adapted from liner notes.

- Music composer and producer – Nathan Johnson
- Sound design, arrangements and programming – Nathan Johnson, Son Lux
- Orchestra conductor – Minna Choi
- Consulting engineer – Eric Dawson Tate
- Assistant engineer – Jorge Velasco
- Field recording – Nathan Johnson
- Instruments and orchestra recording – Yossi Shakked, Adam Munoz, Alberto Hernandez, Eric Dawson Tate
- Mixing – Frank Wolf, Nathan Johnson, Son Lux
- Mastering – Alan Douches
- Music editor – Drew DeAscentis
- Music supervision – John Houlihan
- Music services – Cutting Edge
- Copyist – Minna Choi
- Celesta – Judson Crane
- Drums and percussions – Chris Mears
- Piano – Ryan Lott
- Strings and horns – The Magik*Magik Orchestra
- Violin – Eric Gorfain
