= Knives Out =

2019 film by Rian Johnson

- Theatrical release poster
- Directed by: Rian Johnson
- Written by: Rian Johnson
- Produced by: Ram Bergman; Rian Johnson
- Starring: Daniel Craig; Chris Evans; Ana de Armas; Jamie Lee Curtis; Michael Shannon; Don Johnson; Toni Collette; LaKeith Stanfield; Katherine Langford; Jaeden Martell; Christopher Plummer
- Cinematography: Steve Yedlin
- Edited by: Bob Ducsay
- Music by: Nathan Johnson
- Production companies: MRC; T-Street; Ram Bergman Productions
- Distributed by: Lionsgate
- Release dates: September 7, 2019 (TIFF); November 27, 2019 (United States)
- Running time: 130 minutes
- Country: United States
- Language: English
- Budget: $40 million
- Box office: $312.9 million

Knives Out is a 2019 American mystery film written and directed by Rian Johnson. The film's eleven-actor ensemble cast is led by Daniel Craig as Benoit Blanc, a famed private detective who is summoned to investigate the death of a bestselling author (Christopher Plummer). Police think his death is a suicide but Blanc suspects foul play and investigates to ascertain the true cause of it. Johnson produced Knives Out with his longtime collaborator Ram Bergman. Funding came from MRC and tax subsidies from the Massachusetts state government.

Johnson conceived Knives Out in the mid-2000s. Wanting to create work reminiscent of whodunnit films of the mid-20th century, the director was influenced by his interest in film adaptations of Agatha Christie's stories. Development of Knives Out continued after Johnson finished filming Star Wars: The Last Jedi (2017). He wrote the screenplay in six to seven months. Principal photography on Knives Out began in October 2018 on a $40 million budget and ended that December. Location filming took place in suburban Boston. Nathan Johnson composed the film's classical score, which was inspired by his and Rian's favorite symphonic film scores. Knives Out has been read as a work that investigates class warfare, wealth inequality, immigration, and race in contemporary American society.

Knives Out premiered at the 44th Toronto International Film Festival on September 7, 2019, and was distributed by Lionsgate to American theaters on November 27. It was a critical and commercial success; the National Board of Review and the American Film Institute chose it as one of the year's top films, and it grossed $312 million. Knives Out received positive reviews from critics, who praised the plot and actors but occasionally criticized aspects of the writing and performances. It was nominated for multiple awards, including three Golden Globes, a British Academy Film Award, and an Academy Award for Best Original Screenplay. Knives Out is the first entry of a series of films that also includes Glass Onion (2022) and Wake Up Dead Man (2025).

== Plot ==
The family of wealthy mystery novelist Harlan Thrombey attends his birthday party at his estate. The next morning, Harlan's housekeeper Fran discovers him dead with a slit throat. Police detectives Lieutenant Elliot and Trooper Wagner believe Harlan died by suicide, but private detective Benoit Blanc is anonymously hired to investigate Harlan's death. Blanc learns Harlan had strained relationships with his family members, giving several of them plausible motives for murder.

Unbeknownst to Blanc, Harlan's nurse Marta Cabrera believes she injected Harlan with a lethal dose of morphine after mixing up his bedtime medications the night of the party. To protect Marta from being blamed for his death, Harlan instructed Marta to create a false alibi before he slit his own throat: she was to be seen leaving the house, sneak back in through a window, and disguise herself as Harlan in order to make it appear that he was alive after she left for the night. Marta cannot lie without vomiting, so she gives accurate but incomplete answers when questioned. She agrees to assist Blanc's investigation and conceals evidence incriminating her. At the reading of Harlan's will, Marta is bequeathed his entire fortune and property, stunning the Thrombeys. Harlan's grandson Ransom Drysdale helps Marta flee but manipulates her into confessing to him. Ransom offers further assistance in exchange for a portion of Marta's inheritance. Meanwhile, the other Thrombeys unsuccessfully attempt to influence Marta to renounce the inheritance, even threatening to have her undocumented mother deported.

Marta receives a blackmail note containing a partial photocopy of Harlan's toxicology report. She and Ransom drive to the medical examiner's office, only to find it burned down. Marta receives an email proposing a meeting with the blackmailer; Blanc and the police spot them, leading to Ransom being arrested. At the meeting, Marta finds that Fran, the blackmailer, has been drugged; she performs CPR on Fran and calls an ambulance. Marta confesses to Blanc, but discovers Ransom has already implicated her. Out of moral obligation, Marta believes she must confess to the Thrombeys, which would invalidate the bequest under the slayer rule.

At the mansion, Marta finds Fran's copy of the full toxicology report, which shows Harlan had only trace amounts of morphine in his blood. Blanc reveals his deductions to the police, Marta, and Ransom. Blanc deduces Harlan told Ransom about his will, prompting Ransom to swap Harlan's medicines to cause Marta to kill him unknowingly. However, Marta actually gave Harlan the correct medication, recognizing it by viscosity without reading the label due to her experience as a nurse; she only believed she had poisoned Harlan after reading the label on the bottle with the switched content. When the death was reported as a suicide, Ransom anonymously hired Blanc to entrap Marta. Fran saw Ransom tampering with the crime scene to remove the switched medications, and sent him the blackmail note. After Ransom realized that Marta was not responsible for Harlan's death but believed she was, he forwarded the blackmail letter to Marta and burned down the medical examiner's office to destroy evidence of her innocence. Ransom then overdosed Fran with morphine, intending for Marta to be caught with Fran's corpse.

Marta receives a call from the hospital informing her that Fran has died from her overdose. Since there is no evidence of Ransom committing a murder, Marta lies to the group that Fran is alive while suppressing her urge to vomit. This tricks Ransom into confirming his involvement with Fran's overdose, inadvertently confessing to murder. Realizing his loss, Ransom attacks Marta with a knife from Harlan's collection but the knife is a harmless retractable stage knife. The police promptly arrest him.

Blanc tells Marta he suspected early on that she played a part in Harlan's death, noting a drop of blood on her shoe. He tells Marta her innocence prevailed because she made ethical choices that obstructed Ransom's attempts to incriminate her. As Ransom is taken into custody and the rest of the family is gathered outside in defeat, Marta watches from the balcony of what is now her mansion, sipping from Harlan's coffee mug that reads "My House, My Rules, My Coffee!!".

== Cast ==
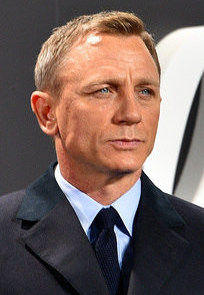
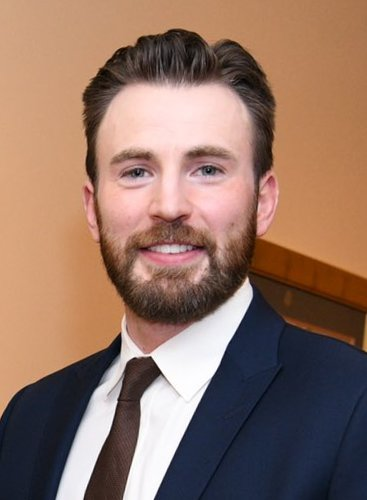
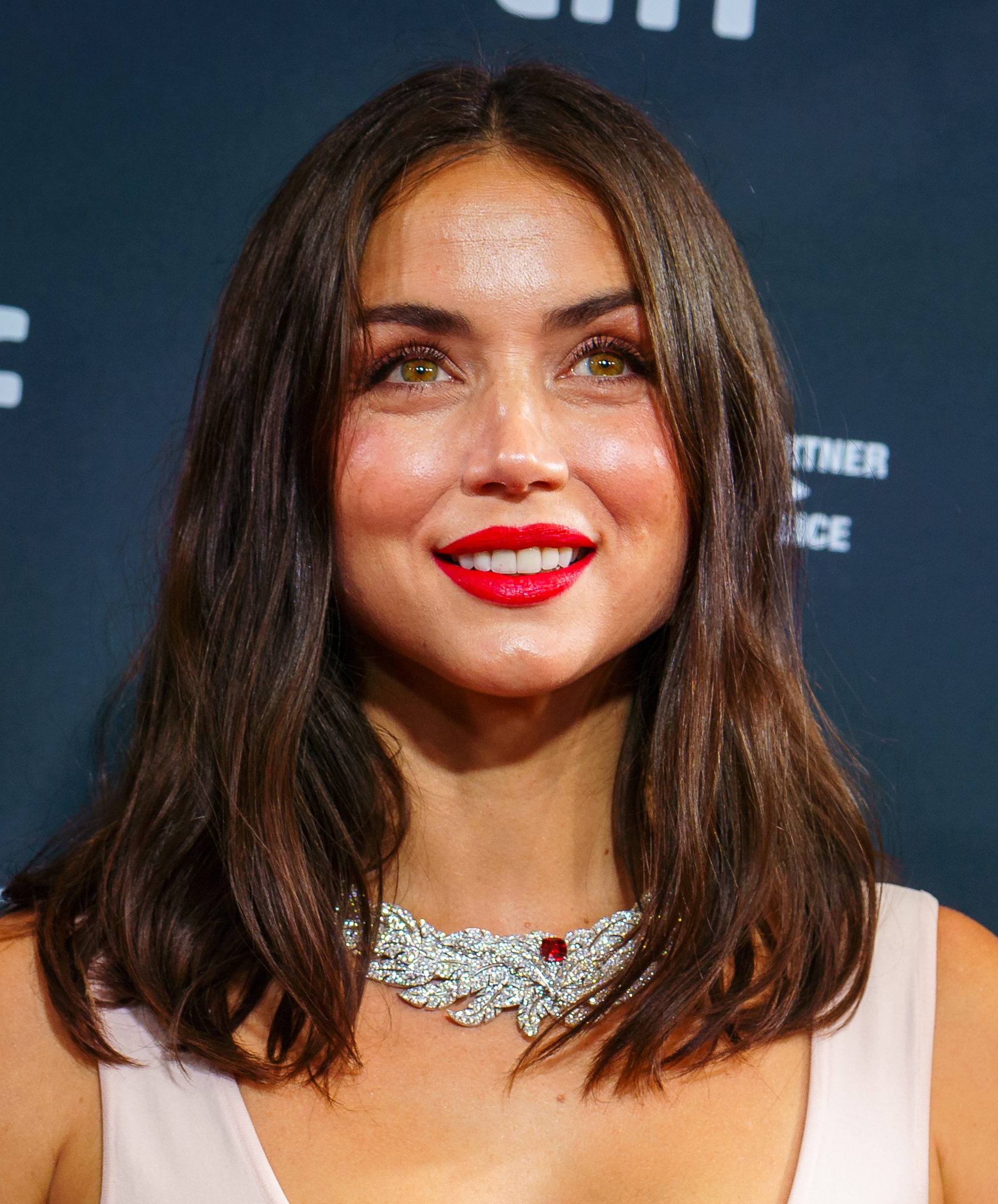
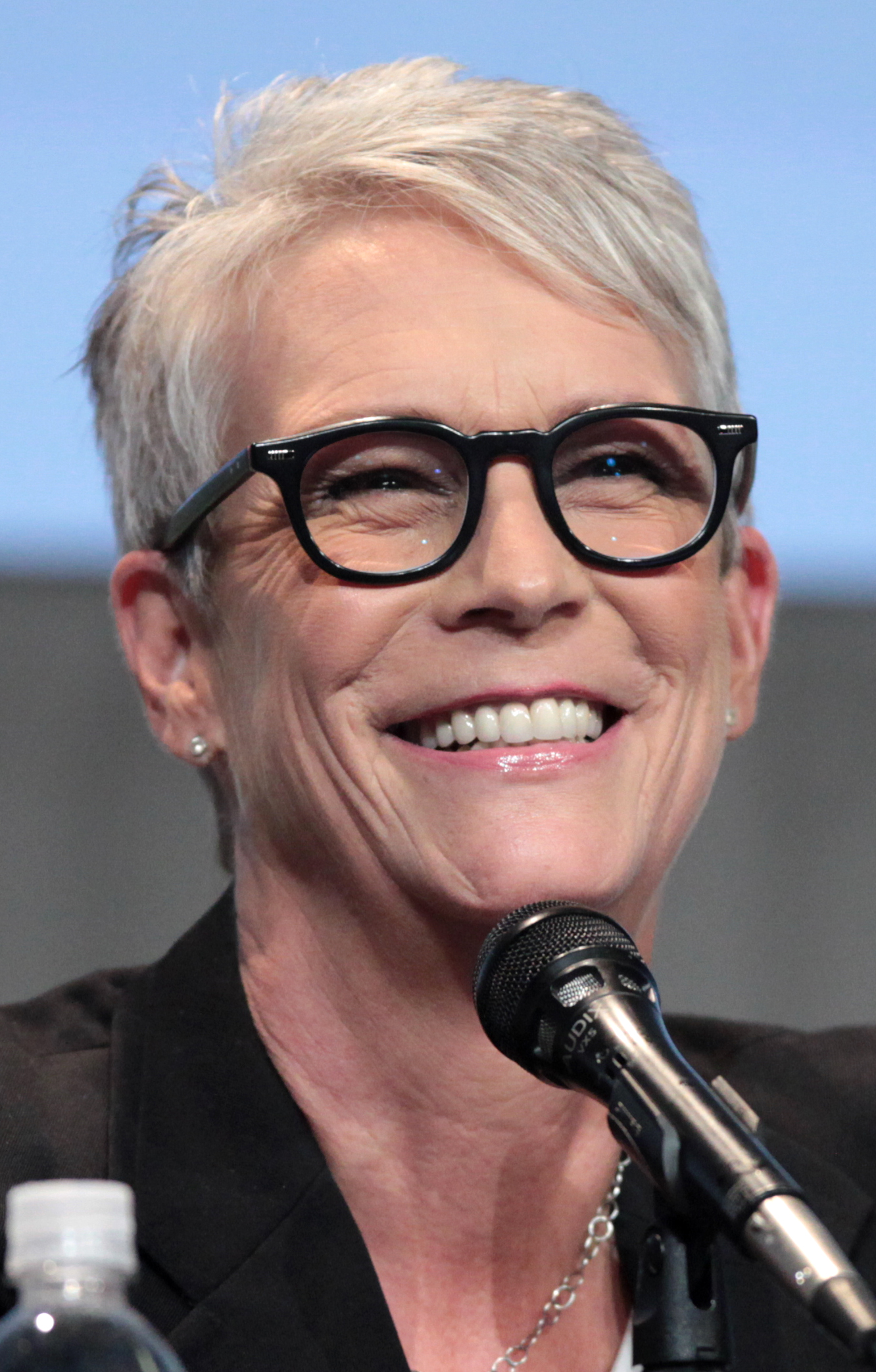
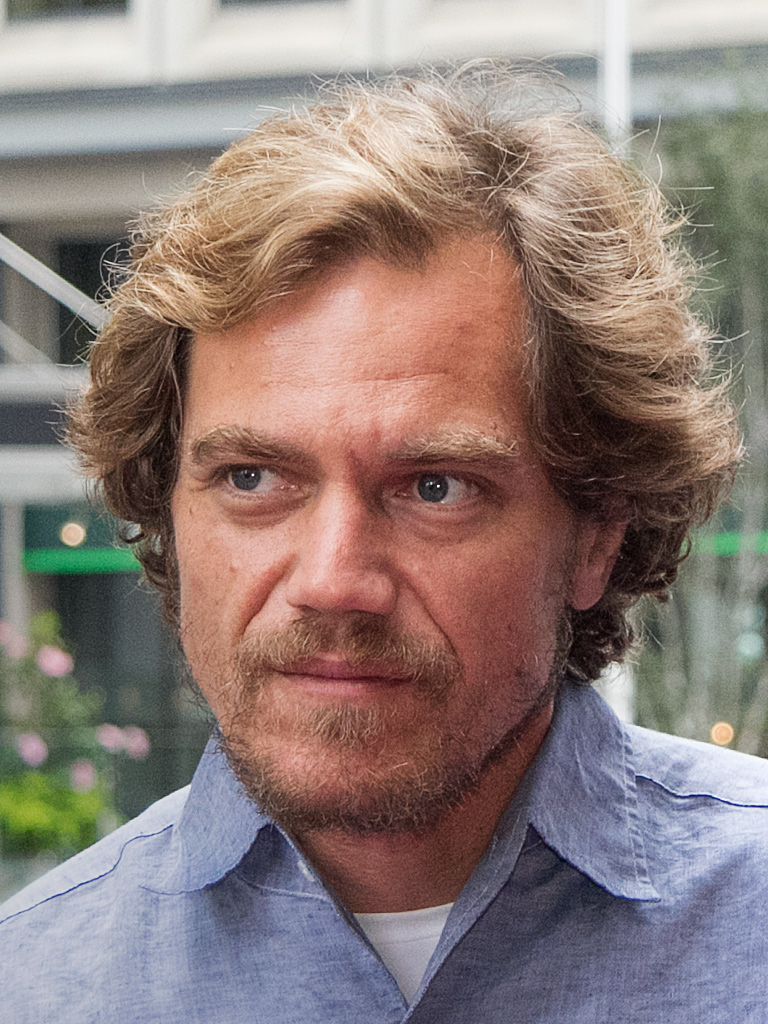
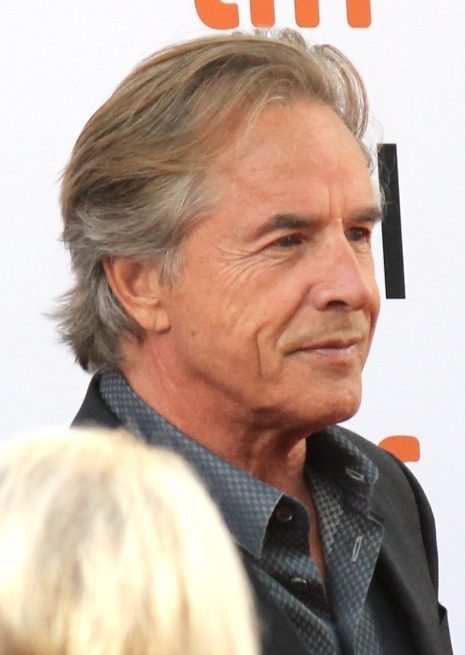
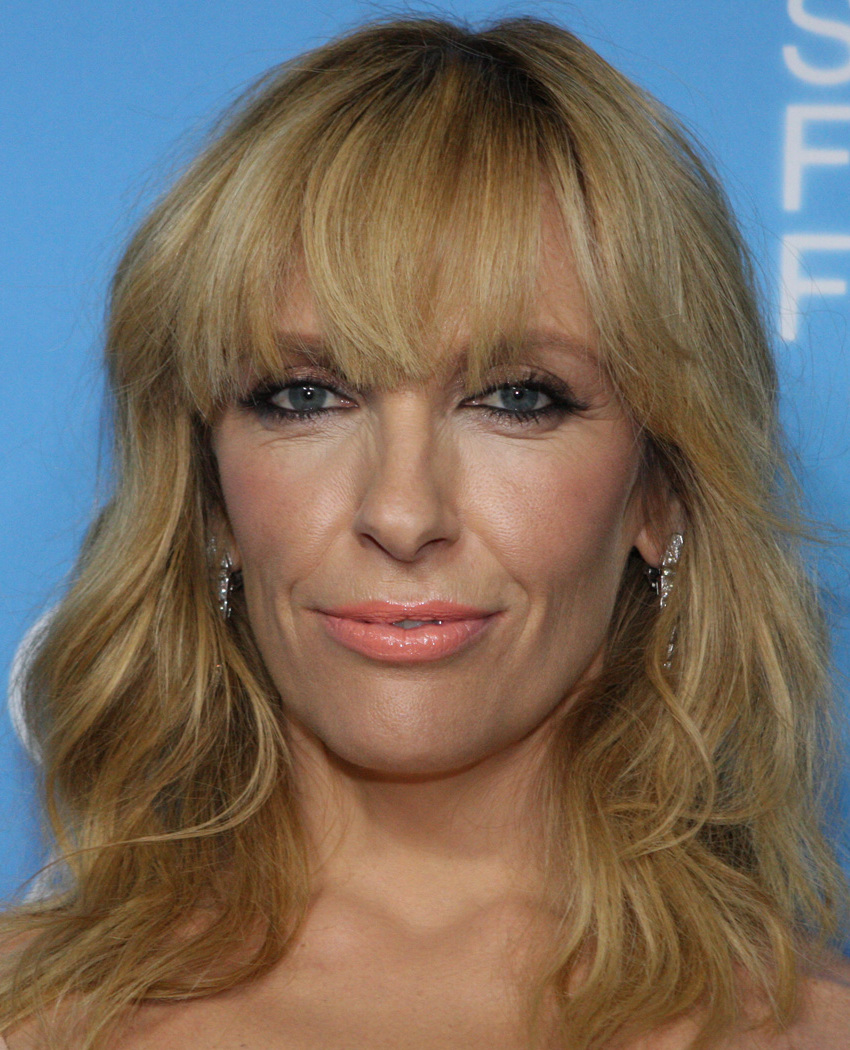
Daniel Craig (in 2015), Chris Evans (in 2020), Ana de Armas (in 2024), Jamie Lee Curtis (in 2015), Michael Shannon (in 2015), Don Johnson (in 2019), and Toni Collette (in 2013)
- Daniel Craig as Benoit Blanc, a private detective
- Chris Evans as Hugh Ransom Drysdale, Linda and Richard's son
- Ana de Armas as Marta Cabrera, Harlan's nurse
- Jamie Lee Curtis as Linda Drysdale, Harlan's daughter
- Michael Shannon as Walt Thrombey, Harlan's youngest son
- Don Johnson as Richard Drysdale, Linda's husband
- Toni Collette as Joni Thrombey, the widow of Harlan's deceased son Neil
- LaKeith Stanfield as Detective Lieutenant Elliott
- Katherine Langford as Meg Thrombey, Joni's daughter
- Jaeden Martell as Jacob Thrombey, Walt's son
- Christopher Plummer as Harlan Thrombey, an 85-year-old best-selling crime novelist
- Frank Oz as Alan Stevens, Harlan's counsel
- Riki Lindhome as Donna Thrombey, Walt's wife
- Edi Patterson as Fran, Harlan's housekeeper
- K Callan as Wanetta "Great Nana" Thrombey, Harlan's mother
- Noah Segan as Trooper Wagner, a police officer
- M. Emmet Walsh as Mr. Proofroc, a security guard
- Marlene Forte as Mrs. Cabrera, Marta and Alice's mother
- Shyrley Rodriguez as Alicia "Alice" Cabrera, Marta's younger sister
- Kerry Frances as Sally, Alan's assistant
- Joseph Gordon-Levitt as Detective Hardrock (voice cameo)

== Production ==
=== Development ===
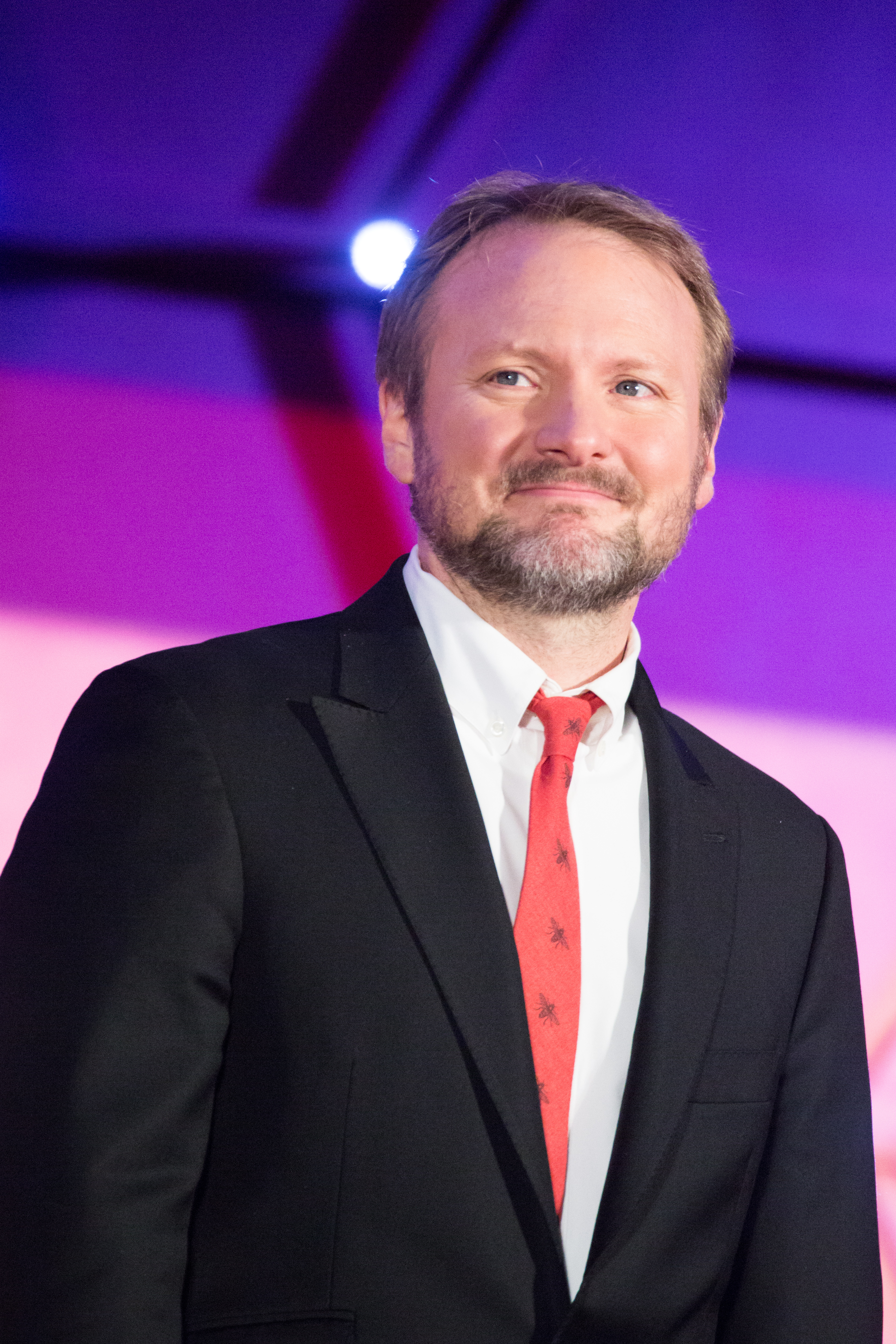
Director Rian Johnson at the Star Wars: The Last Jedi Tokyo premiere in 2017

Director Rian Johnson first conceived of Knives Out after the completion of the low-budget thriller Brick (2005), his first feature film. His idea was influenced by film adaptations of books by detective fiction writer Agatha Christie that he enjoyed as a child. Johnson referred to Alfred Hitchcock's advice on plot development for guidance, which said conventional whodunits too often relied on formulaic suspense, especially a climactic plot twist, to culminate the story. Once he had determined the story's goal, Johnson began conceiving ideas for the plot structure, mainly a framework of tonal shifts he devised to incite tension in the story. The director said his greatest challenge was modernizing a genre studios deemed too antiquated for release.

Johnson planned to draft Knives Out after the release of his science fiction thriller Looper (2012), but he suspended the project when Lucasfilm hired him to direct Star Wars: The Last Jedi (2017). His experience witnessing the intense culture war backlash to The Last Jedi became another source of inspiration for the Knives Out story. Johnson began scriptwriting by January 2018, immediately after finishing his press tour for The Last Jedi, in a process lasting between six and seven months, depending on the source. When Johnson showed a finished draft to friends, he recalled the response was cynical because the director's motivations were poorly understood. Johnson took the film's name from the Radiohead song of the same name, saying it was a good title for a murder mystery. He took the name Harlan Thrombey from a 1981 Choose Your Own Adventure whodunit, Who Killed Harlowe Thrombey?

Media coverage of Knives Out gives conflicting accounts of the film's funding. One report circulated by Deadline said MRC secured the script in an auction hosted by Creative Artists Agency and FilmNation to investors at the 43rd Toronto International Film Festival. Johnson's longtime collaborator Ram Bergman disputed this account; according to him, no auction was held and MRC was always the intended financier because of its sustained success with mass-market films by auteurs—directors who wield significant autonomy over the artistic vision of their projects. MRC financed the film's $40 million budget and generous back-end compensation for Bergman, Johnson, and Daniel Craig, per the condition of their agreement. For Knives Out's commercial distribution, MRC partnered with Lionsgate, which was trying to recover from a year of mediocre box office showings and purchased a partial share of the distribution rights.

=== Casting ===
Employing an ensemble cast of established stars was one of Johnson's initial demands. He drew upon the Agatha Christie films—chiefly Peter Ustinov-starred projects à la Death on the Nile (1978) and Evil Under the Sun (1982)—for his casting choices because he felt they have a sense of spectacle that was worth replicating. The filmmakers focused on actors who were available in the six week period before filming for Knives Out began. Actors were chosen for their ability to stand out in bit speaking parts and master an exaggerated, but not caricatured, comic performance. According to Johnson, the film's rapid progress readily facilitated his casting ambitions. Most of the Knives Out ensemble were signed in October and November 2018. (Note: Attributed to multiple sources:) Johnson named each of the characters after musicians whose works he enjoyed because it was a simple practice to remember—for example, Joni Mitchell, Richard Thompson, and Steely Dan's Donald Fagen.

Daniel Craig came to Johnson's attention for his stage work and non-James Bond film roles. Johnson regarded Craig as a versatile actor who wanted to challenge his abilities in a playful comedy role. Craig declined the offer due to his contractual obligations as James Bond to No Time to Die (2021), which was preparing to film around the same time, but logistical and creative disputes postponed the film's production by three months, giving Craig enough time to accept Johnson's offer. Once Craig read his copy of the script, he agreed to join because the writing's tone and humor captivated him. The treatment of Blanc was initially a fruitless task for Johnson; his first concept had been a Hercule Poirot clone "that was just a bunch of crazy quirks". To distinguish the character, Johnson outlined Blanc as a slightly pompous man with a flamboyant Southern accent, turning to Craig's ongoing feedback for a unique characterization. Craig undertook speech training with a dialect coach for two to three hours per day, studying playwright Tennessee Williams and author Shelby Foote via interview footage from C-SPAN and the Ken Burns-helmed docuseries The Civil War (1990) to model Blanc's voice.

Casting director Mary Vernieu was responsible for casting Marta Cabrera. Vernieu and the filmmakers did not favor a particular person for the part, unlike the other Knives Out characters, and based their search on Johnson's preference for a relatively unknown actor that could exhibit an underdog-like quality. They considered several candidates, including Ana de Armas, whose work piqued Vernieu's interest enough to be suggested in casting discussions. Johnson was not familiar with de Armas' repertoire save for her starring role in Blade Runner 2049 (2017). Johnson liked de Armas' acting but believed she was too beautiful to convincingly portray Cabrera. When Johnson met de Armas for her audition, he noticed her ability to emote, saying, "She's got that Audrey Hepburn-type thing, where her eyes just bring you in, and you're instantly on her side, and that's what we needed for the character". De Armas nearly rejected the role because she found Cabrera's original character description clichéd; she was persuaded to accept after reading the complete script, which she found emphasized resilience as a fundamental attribute of Cabrera. Cabrera's immigrant backstory also resonated with de Armas.

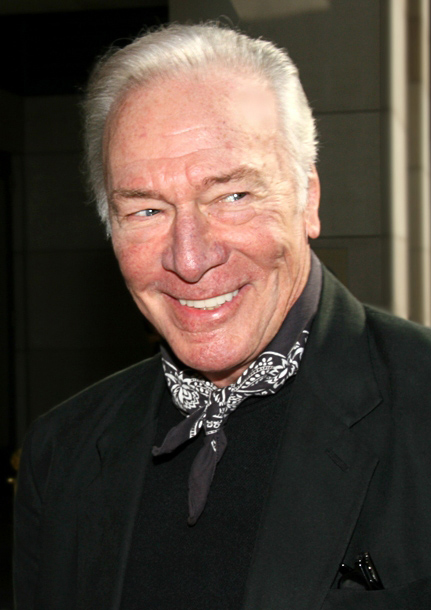
Christopher Plummer in 2007

For the self-indulgent Ransom Drysdale, Johnson envisioned Chris Evans after seeing him in the 2018 Broadway revival of Kenneth Lonergan's Lobby Hero, having been impressed with his performance as a contemptible villain. Evans was mainly known for his live-action role as Steve Rogers / Captain America in the Marvel Cinematic Universe (MCU) and Johnson aimed to use Evans' everyman persona to create tension between moviegoers and Drysdale, saying: "You've got to see it not as baggage, but as ammunition. If there was someone in that part who the audience inherently wanted to like, that would help the arc overall". Although Evans was preparing to take a hiatus after finishing his work on Avengers: Endgame (2019), he reconsidered when the producers told him they would be filming near his home in Massachusetts.

Toni Collette said her biggest purpose for playing Joni was to find humor in her character. Christopher Plummer, in one of his final film appearances before his death in 2021, described Harlan as a "stern, bright and rough-hewn" father with a crass sense of humor. Michael Shannon did not audition for the role of Walt and was contracted following an arranged lunch with Johnson. For the part of Linda, Jamie Lee Curtis sympathized with her backstory as a woman who is fiercely scrutinized for her privilege. She stated:

I've been an actress for a long time, and I am also the daughter of someone famous, and people have a funny way of taking away anything you do creatively and reduce it to your privilege. Linda is very defensive about the assumption that she was given anything, and I've had the same defense.

To prepare for her performance, Curtis immersed herself in activities she thought befitted her character's position as a matriarch, such as cooking meals.

=== Filming ===
Bergman was assembling the filmmaking crew while Johnson revised the script in early 2018. Johnson instructed the filmmakers to find an estate that exuded Harlan's mystery writing sensibilities, citing the thriller Sleuth (1972) as a reference for recognizable visual elements. Bergman scouted several homes with his team before centering the film's production on two sprawling mansions in suburban Boston: a privately owned nineteenth-century Gothic Revival manor that was used for exterior shots, and Ames Mansion, a 20-room historic landmark in Borderland State Park in Easton.

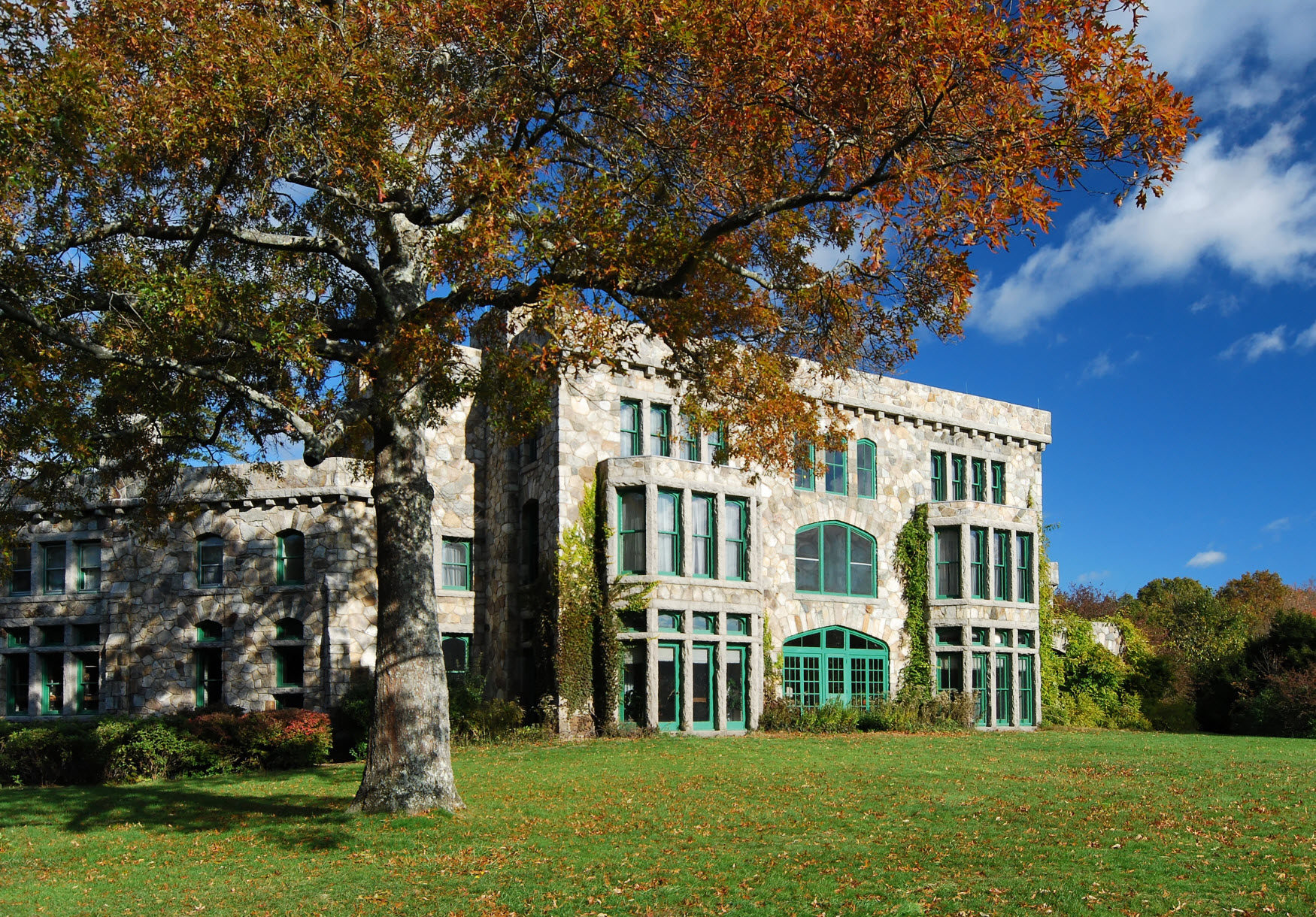
Estate of the Ames Mansion (pictured in 2010), which doubled for the Thrombey residence in interior scenes.

Most of the interior shots, including intense, confrontational scenes with Harlan and his relatives and conversational scenes of Blanc's investigation, took place in Ames Mansion. The production was challenged by the logistics of the mansions, neither of which had sufficient space in the upper floors to realize Harlan's office or corresponding scenes. The production designer David Crank constructed the office set, which included an adjacent hallway, on soundstages, working closely with Johnson to coordinate the movement of characters with the configuration of the homes and artificial sets.

Principal photography began on October 30, 2018, under the working title Morning Bell, in Maynard, Massachusetts. The filmmakers converted vacant retail space into a laundromat in preparation for the first shoot. Elsewhere in Greater Boston, scenes were filmed near an MBTA passenger rail station in downtown Natick; a private, mid-century modern estate in Lincoln, Canton, Wellesley, Waltham, Medfield; and an unoccupied, state-owned facility in Marlborough (once the town's RMV Service Center) that was chosen for its round shape. (Note: Attributed to multiple sources:) The Marlborough location was used for exterior scenes at the burned-down medical examiner's office; the scene involved pyrotechnics and a group of local firefighters were used as extras portraying a firefighting operation. Filming for the project took approximately 38 days and ended on December 20, 2018. Knives Out qualified for a $10 million transferable tax credit on in-state costs from the Government of Massachusetts.

=== Cinematography ===
Knives Out was director of photography Steve Yedlin's fifth project with Rian Johnson. Yedlin and Johnson storyboarded their visual composition ideas before principal photography, which did not describe the onscreen universe in depth. A double-camera setup was used with two operators, one a longstanding collaborator of Yedlin. Yedlin described the on-set environment as experimental and visually creative. He filmed Knives Out in standard 1.85:1 aspect ratio using Alexa Mini cameras that were equipped with Zeiss Master Prime lenses. The Zeiss Prime's scaling capability supported the film's use of wide-angle shots. The filmmakers believed wider camera lenses emphasized the worldbuilding by showing characters in their surroundings. They also used Panavision's PCZ Primo 19–90 and PZW 15–40 zoom lenses because zooming is customary in Johnson's oeuvre. Yedlin and production members used action-building techniques that centered on Robert Altman's cinematic style, through a complex system of whip pans, zooming, and camera dolly movements. Panavision's Hollywood office loaned the production camera equipment.

Part of Knives Out's production was devoted to realizing a specialized process of color grading for the film's visual effects, based on qualitative data collected from Yedlin's field research. Yedlin's usual strategy prioritized a lookup table (LUT) to augment a film's visual palette, and he observed photochemistry to create his color-grading formula. Yedlin worked with FotoKem to expand properties of halation, gate weave, and film grain. To illuminate interior mansion scenes, Yedlin fitted the sets with overhead lighting equipment designed by Arri SkyPanels and custom RGBWW LED strip fixtures—a class of modulated multicolor strip lights that were bundled in foam sheets for light diffusion. Yedlin also used computer software and a spectrometer to gauge the sunlight's chromaticity, its specified color quality, and requisite tones to generate textural variations.

=== Set design ===
The script contained few details about the design of the Thrombey residence, so the clearest vision of the estate emerged from conversations about aesthetics between Johnson, Crank, and the set decorator David Schlesinger. The design team were drawn to Ames Mansion because the original architectural elements had been preserved, endowing the sets with an aged quality. Crank and Schlesinger handled the sourcing and arrangement of props for the interior mansion sets. They located the film's decorative items from a range of businesses, souvenir collectors, and ordinary people in Boston and New York City. The script only specified details for a few objects; for the rest, Schlesinger used Harlan's imaginary oeuvre of mysteries as inspiration for his souvenirs and knick-knacks.

A collection of automata, doll-like mechanical devices that imitate human mannerisms, was chief among the artifacts. The automata were costly, fragile and rare to obtain, requiring thorough scouting from the producers, and additional caveats—transportation, storage, rental fees—complicated the expense. Schlesinger inquired at museums and private collectors before contacting the Morris Museum's Murtogh D. Guinness Collection in Morristown, New Jersey, one of the world's largest automata exhibits, but the museum prohibited all non-exhibition uses of its pieces. They instead directed Schlesinger and his prop-makers to a local restorer who owned a private collection to negotiate. Upon approval, the producers hired another local collector to transport the automata and install them on the set. The background props also included large dollhouses, crime scene dioramas, Harlan's library of books, and a stash clock.

Creation of Knives Out's most significant prop, the "Wheel of Knives"—a throne chair positioned in front of a ringed display of knives—daunted the art department. The chair was conceived of as a library piece but the script did not explain any correlation to the story; Crank said developing an established cause was "a long process". The art department abandoned early concepts until they imagined a design with an armature and a chain from which to hang the display.

=== Music ===
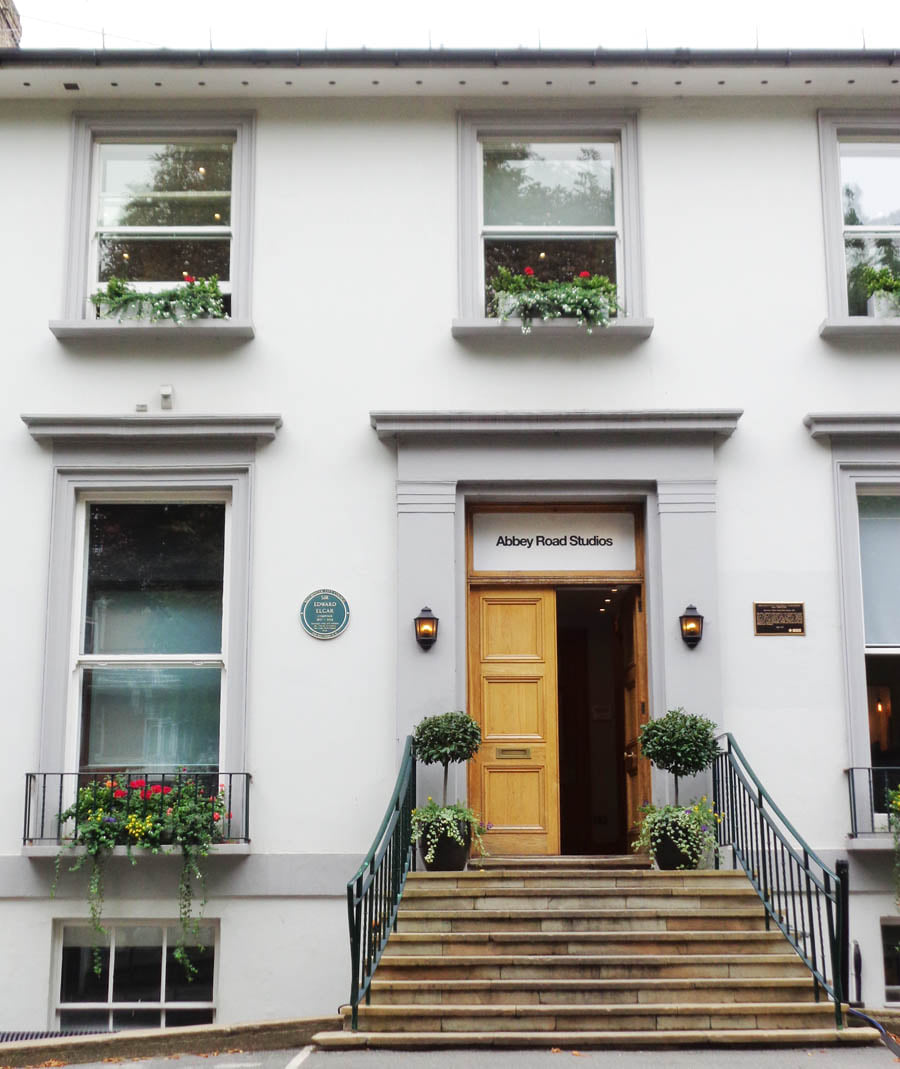
Nathan Johnson recorded the Knives Out score at Abbey Road Studios in London (pictured in 2021).

Rian Johnson pitched Knives Out to composer Nathan Johnson—cousin and another frequent associate—as early as 2009. Their first conversation concerned the context of music in the opening scenes, and they sought a score that reflected the film's key events and drama with an abrasive classical sound. Nathan recorded the Knives Out score with an orchestra at Abbey Road Studios in London, UK. To prepare, Nathan Johnson engaged the production while principal photography was ongoing; he visited the set to gain a premise for melodic cues and motifs. This was an uncommon experience as the standard industry practice for composers is to work in post-production after filming has finished. "Knives Out! (String Quartet in G Minor)", the opening string-quartet theme and Nathan's earliest contribution, provided the impetus for the album.

Nathan and Rian were inspired for Knives Out's musical direction by their favorite symphonic film scores, such as Death on the Nile (1978), Lawrence of Arabia (1962), and the compositions of Bernard Herrmann. The use of an orchestra distinguishes Knives Out from other films directed by Rian Johnson, which experimented with cheaper, unconventional instruments. It was Nathan's first large-scale orchestral score, him being solely experienced with small ensembles. Cut Narrative Records released the soundtrack on November 27, 2019, in tandem with the film's theatrical launch.

== Themes ==
Knives Out has been read as work that investigates class warfare, wealth inequality, immigration, and race in contemporary American society. In interviews organized for the press junket, Bergman, Johnson, and some of the actors expressed candid views of the central themes in Knives Out, allowing multiple interpretations of the film. Johnson stated the central story neither condemns nor subscribes to a single ideology; rather, it was designed to provoke all moviegoers to contemplate. Johnson regarded whodunits as well suited to scrutinization of institutional power, a belief influenced by Christie's writings, work he considers indicative of an apolitical woman who was attuned to British society throughout her life.

=== Class warfare ===
Knives Out ranks with other turn-of-the-2020s-decade films, such as Ready or Not, Parasite, Hustlers, and Joker (all 2019), in which class warfare is the unifying theme. Knives Out makes literal class struggle by framing Harlan's death as an explicit tale of good versus evil, and Cabrera emerges as the hero because of her humanity. Whereas Cabrera is distraught from the moment Harlan dies, the surviving Thrombeys are fractured by greed that is fueled by their stakes in Harlan's publishing fortune. They are ruthless and oblivious to Harlan's death in a quest for wealth they feel entitled to control and seize by any means. In this sense, the Thrombeys, not the elusive suspect per se, represent the true villains. In spite of the family's contempt for her and the working class, Cabrera resists their coercion using her wit and moral convictions. Much emphasis is placed on the alternating points of view of Marta's ordeal to reinforce divisions between the classes. According to Fast Company's Joe Berkowitz, this device forms the film's class consciousness. Professor Eugene Nulman interprets the characters' adversarial relationships as expressions of an allegorical critique of capitalism.

=== Race ===
Race was also examined in thematic studies of the film. Knives Out concentrates on a critique of white supremacy and liberal paternalism, comically depicting the Thrombey–Cabrera relationship through condescending affection and running gags about Cabrera's country of origin. In his essay for White Supremacy and the American Media, Michael Blouin contests the film's analysis of white nationalism. According to Blouin, Knives Out resigns itself to Jeffersonian democratic ideals of liberal universalism, pragmatic reasoning, and an a priori sense of justice that support a set of racialized assumptions. In doing so, all expressed antagonism is neutralized, therefore "depoliticizing a crisis that has so far proven to be resistant to the ideal prescribed by many white liberals".

=== Narrative structure ===
In Knives Out, Johnson experiments with narrative structure to generate suspense. It begins in a traditional whodunit format that is subverted by two tonal shifts. The first shift arranges the plot as a thriller by establishing Cabrera's reckoning with the manner of Harlan's death, her own implication in it, and her quest to evade the investigation's purview as causes of conflict, thus framing Blanc as the antagonist. In the second shift, through plausible deniability, Cabrera's innocence is unequivocal. This posed a significant writing challenge; Johnson intended Cabrera to be a sympathetic character whose behavior was to be perceived as justified. He also wanted to portray the extremes to which an innocent person might go when threatened with incarceration.

== Release ==
=== Marketing ===
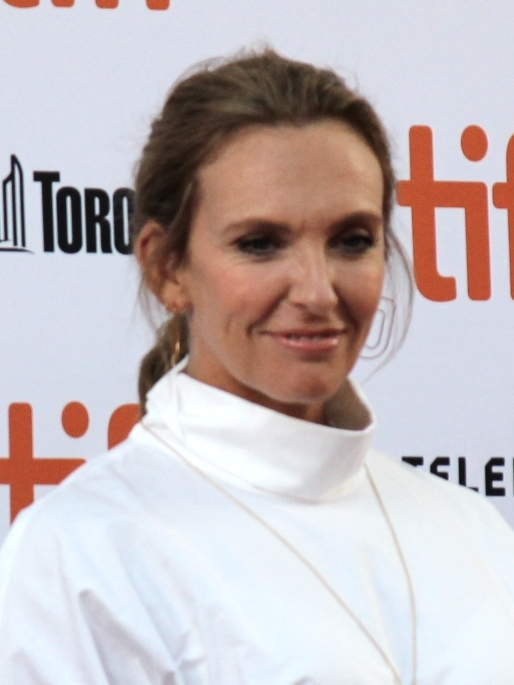
Toni Collette at Knives Out's Toronto International Film Festival premiere

Knives Out premiered at the 44th Toronto International Film Festival on September 7, 2019, as part of the festival's special presentations line-up. It headlined the 14th Fantastic Fest in Austin, Texas as the closing film, then concluded its North American festival itinerary at the Chicago International Film Festival's Centerpiece showcase. In Europe, Knives Out debuted at the 63rd BFI London Film Festival, which was held from October 2 to 13, 2019, as one of the event's gala entries.

Lionsgate supervised the film's advertising campaign; it opened the promotional cycle in April 2019 with a showcasing preview at CinemaCon, where the film's first teaser trailer of the film was revealed. This was followed by another trade-show exhibit at CineEurope that June. Aggressive social media engagement was a critical part of the marketing campaign. Early tactics focused on feel-good messaging, the film's campy humor, and Thrombey family enterprises—the latter-most featuring Shannon, Collette, and Curtis in character—through video parodies and mock advertisements that were developed using website-building platforms. The campaign resumed in the weeks following Knives Out's late November release, when Ransom's off-white, knitted Aran sweater went viral, prompting a brief renaming of the film's official Twitter account to "Chris Evans' Sweater Stan Account"; there was also a merchandise giveaway to maximize publicity. Advertisements for the film mostly intrigued men but showed strong appeal from women of all ages. For licensed artwork, in September 2019, Johnson unveiled a set of colorful, brooding character posters, each with the tagline: "Nothing brings a family together like murder". Johnson also recorded an interactive audio commentary to entice repeated business.

Knives Out opened in theaters in North America and the United Kingdom on November 27, 2019. The global release expanded to China, France, Australia, Russia, and 49 other territories in the second week. Its final release was in Japan on January 31, 2020. Industry professionals saw Knives Out as a potential hit based on sustained interest from enthusiastic pre-release reviews, the unique self-referentiality, and the ensemble's star power, especially that of Evans, Craig, and Curtis. The success was considered contingent on the film's ability to attract a broad audience rather than a niche demographic of adults.

=== Home media ===
Lionsgate released Knives Out on digital formats on February 7, 2020, and on DVD, Blu-ray, and 4K on February 25. Physical copies include deleted scenes; a behind-the-scenes featurette; audio commentary from Johnson, Yedlin, and Noah Segan; an eight-part documentary; advertisements; and previously unaired press interviews. It was the second-best-selling DVD and Blu-ray release in its first week of US sales, selling 248,286 copies and earning $4.6 million. By January 2023, the film had sold 1.47 million copies. Knives Out is also available to authenticated Amazon subscribers via the company's Prime Video streaming service.

== Reception ==
=== Box office ===
Knives Out endured at the box office as an adult-targeted film in a theatrical season dominated by family blockbusters such as Frozen 2. Knives Out earned $165.4 million in the United States and Canada (52.8% of its earnings), and $147.5 million overseas (47.2%) for a worldwide total of $312.9 million, making it the 29th-highest-grossing film of 2019. Of this amount, $82 million was estimated to have been yielded by the MRC–Lionsgate partnership in net profit, factoring in marketing, equipment, royalties, interest, and miscellaneous costs. China was the most lucrative overseas market, and positive press improved the film's performance in that country. The United Kingdom, Germany, Australia, and France provided some of the film's largest takings.

In the US, after securing $2 million from advanced screenings, Knives Out received a wide release in 3,391 theaters. It benefited from a five-day tracking period due to the US Thanksgiving holiday Thursday. This increased the first week sum to $41.7 million, ahead of the three-week old Ford v Ferrari and second to Frozen II, which was in its second weekend. Knives Out's opening gross nearly doubled the prognosticators' pre-release estimates of $22–25 million. CinemaScore polls that were conducted during the opening night found moviegoers gave the film an average grade of A− on a scale of A+ to F. Screenings attracted mostly men, and approximately 73% were over 25 years of age, 46% were over 35, and 63% were white. On the second weekend, Knives Out took $14.2 million from 3,461 theaters, remaining the number two film, and earnings dropped by about 35% the following week. In the fourth weekend, the film slipped to number five with a gross of $6.5 million, its theater count reduced to slightly above 2,500, though box office figures grew by 50% for the Christmas holiday week (seventh, with $9.7 million). Knives Out remained one of the top ten highest-grossing films for ten weeks, and the theater count stayed above 2,000 at the end of the year. By February 2020, the film's domestic gross exceeded $159 million.

Overseas, Knives Out's overall November 27 week rank was second to that of Frozen II at $28.3 million. China had the largest portion of the earnings with $13.5 million, which was followed by the UK at $3.8 million from 632 theaters, Russia at $2 million from 1,451 theaters, Australia at $1.9 million from 282 theaters, and France at $1.5 million from 437 theaters. Knives Out sustained its box office momentum in China and the UK into the second weekend, resulting in a 20% drop in revenue in the latter. After four weeks, it had earned $27.9 million in China and $13.7 million in the UK. The overseas releases continued into mid-December; key releases were in South Korea (fourth) at $1.7 million from 686 cinemas, Italy (third) at $1.2 million from 362 cinemas, and Mexico (second) at $1.1 million from 871 cinemas. The Christmas period saw reinvigorated ticket sales in France, Australia, and the UK, and in Russia, the New Year holiday increased the film's box office take by 152% over the previous week. In Brazil, Knives Out debuted as the top-grossing movie when it premiered on the weekend of December 12, earning $1.1 million. On its inaugural weekend elsewhere, the film took $2.7 million in Germany and $665,000 in Austria. Within a month, Knives Out's international gross exceeded $100 million.

=== Critical response ===
Knives Out opened to widely positive reviews; by the end of 2019, it was considered one of the year's best films by the American Film Institute, National Board of Review, and the mainstream press in ranked lists. A routinely discussed aspect in the media was the scriptwriting. Knives Out received notice for its unusual plot structure; reviewers said the film defied expectations by using numerous narrative twists and by satirizing murder-mystery tropes. (Note: Attributed to multiple sources:) Film critics had high regard for director Johnson's comic treatment of a traditional detective story; (Note: Attributed to multiple sources:) it was described as "enjoyably, wackily serpentine", noted by The New Yorker for its sardonic humor and "sheen of smugness". Although comparisons to source material based on tenor, humor, craftmanship, and faithfulness varied among professional opinions, (Note: Attributed to multiple sources:) the story's play on perspective among the characters produced favorable responses. (Note: Attributed to multiple sources:) According to Stephanie Zacharek for Time, the squabbling between characters who were avaricious, untrustworthy, and ostensibly driven by the same interest provides the film's most entertaining moments. The writing's political consciousness was cited as among the strengths of Knives Out, although the handling of ideas received occasional disapproval from others, such as The New York Times' Manohla Dargis, and Uproxx, for being perceived as too vapid to resonate. The least enthusiastic reviews accused the film of being convoluted, self-indulgent, and too reliant on exposition-dense dialogue to advance the story. In December 2021, Knives Out's screenplay was ranked at number forty-nine on the Writers Guild of America's list of "101 Greatest Screenplays of the 21st Century (So Far)". In 2025, the film ranked number 91 on the "Readers' Choice" edition of The New York Times' list of "The 100 Best Movies of the 21st Century."

The actors' performances was another major subject of critiques. The Knives Out ensemble was warmly received, their work was praised as "outstanding" and "wildly charismatic", with a rapport Vanity Fair ascribed to a shared conviction of the material. Media somewhat focused on Daniel Craig and Ana de Armas, but also gave individual notices to Jamie Lee Curtis, Toni Collette, Chris Evans, Don Johnson, Michael Shannon, Christopher Plummer, and Noah Segan for their acting. (Note: Attributed to multiple sources:) Critics delighted in Craig's portrayal of an eccentric sleuth in expression and appearance, (Note: Attributed to multiple sources:) the actor noted for emanating "infectious enjoyment" onscreen. De Armas, whose portrayal was described as "superb" and "wonderful", drew similarly strong assessments of her character work from the likes of San Francisco Chronicle's Mick LaSalle and The Atlantic, among others, in what was considered a breakout performance. Though the two actors were singled out for further praise because of their onscreen chemistry in conversational scenes, neither they nor their costars were free of criticism. Dissenting opinions judged Craig's Southern accent harshly, and Uproxx said de Armas's acting skill was at odds with the dramatic depth of her role. A few actors were regarded as underused because of the ensemble's large size, which Uproxx said reduced their interactions to a "constant, white noise-esque drone of overacting".

On the review aggregation website Rotten Tomatoes, Knives Out holds an approval rating of 97% based on 472 reviews. The website's critics' consensus reads: "Knives Out sharpens old murder-mystery tropes with a keenly assembled suspense outing that makes brilliant use of writer-director Rian Johnson's stellar ensemble." Metacritic, which uses a weighted average, assigned the film a score of 82 out of 100 based on reviews from 52 critics, indicating "universal acclaim".

=== Accolades ===
Accolades received by Knives Out
Award	Date of ceremony	Category	Recipient(s)	Result	Ref.
AACTA International Awards	January 3, 2020	Best International Supporting Actress	Toni Collette	Nominated	
Academy Awards	February 9, 2020	Best Original Screenplay	Rian Johnson	Nominated	
Actors and Actresses Union Awards	March 9, 2020	Best Actress in an International Production	Ana de Armas	Won	
Alliance of Women Film Journalists Awards	January 10, 2020	Best Screenplay, Original	Rian Johnson	Nominated	
American Cinema Editors Awards	January 17, 2020	Best Edited Feature Film – Comedy or Musical	Bob Ducsay	Nominated	
American Film Institute Awards	January 3, 2020	Top Ten Films of the Year	Knives Out	Won (Note: This award does not have a single winner, but recognizes multiple films.)	
Art Directors Guild Awards	February 1, 2020	Best Contemporary Film	David Crank	Nominated	
Artios Awards	January 30, 2020	Feature Big Budget – Comedy	Mary Vernieu, Angela Peri, and Brett Howe	Won	
Austin Film Critics Association Awards	January 7, 2020	Best Original Screenplay	Rian Johnson	Nominated	
Austin Film Critics Association Awards	January 7, 2020	Best Ensemble	Knives Out	Won	
British Academy Film Awards	February 2, 2020	Best Original Screenplay	Rian Johnson	Nominated	
Chicago Film Critics Association Awards	December 14, 2019	Best Original Screenplay	Rian Johnson	Nominated	
Chicago Film Critics Association Awards	December 14, 2019	Best Art Direction	Knives Out	Nominated	
Costume Designers Guild Awards	January 28, 2020	Excellence in Contemporary Film	Jenny Eagan	Won	
Critics' Choice Movie Awards	January 12, 2020	Best Acting Ensemble	Knives Out	Nominated	
Critics' Choice Movie Awards	January 12, 2020	Best Original Screenplay	Rian Johnson	Nominated	
Critics' Choice Movie Awards	January 12, 2020	Best Comedy	Knives Out	Nominated	
Detroit Film Critics Society Awards	December 9, 2019	Best Breakthrough Performance	Ana de Armas	Nominated	
Dorian Awards	January 8, 2020	Screenplay of the Year	Rian Johnson	Nominated	
Dorian Awards	January 8, 2020	Campy Film of the Year	Knives Out	Nominated	
Georgia Film Critics Association Awards	January 10, 2020	Best Original Screenplay	Rian Johnson	Nominated	
Golden Globe Awards	January 5, 2020	Best Motion Picture – Musical or Comedy	Knives Out	Nominated	
Golden Globe Awards	January 5, 2020	Best Actor – Musical or Comedy	Daniel Craig	Nominated	
Golden Globe Awards	January 5, 2020	Best Actress – Musical or Comedy	Ana de Armas	Nominated	
Golden Trailer Awards	July 22, 2021	Most Original TV Spot (for a Feature Film)	"Knives Out Knives" (Viacom Velocity)	Nominated	
Golden Trailer Awards	July 22, 2021	Best Viral Campaign for a Feature Film	"Knives Out Knives" (Viacom Velocity)	Nominated	
Golden Trailer Awards	July 22, 2021	Best Viral Campaign for a Feature Film	"Sweater" (ZEALOT)	Nominated	
Hollywood Critics Association Awards	January 9, 2020	Best Cast	Knives Out	Won	
Hollywood Critics Association Awards	January 9, 2020	Best Original Screenplay	Rian Johnson	Nominated	
Houston Film Critics Society Awards	January 2, 2020	Best Picture	Knives Out	Nominated	
Houston Film Critics Society Awards	January 2, 2020	Best Screenplay	Rian Johnson	Won	
Imagen Awards	September 24, 2020	Best Actress – Feature Film	Ana de Armas	Nominated	
Kansas City Film Critics Circle Awards	December 15, 2019	Best Original Screenplay	Rian Johnson	Won	
London Film Critics' Circle Awards	January 30, 2020	Film of the Year	Knives Out	Nominated	
National Board of Review Awards	January 8, 2020	Top Ten Films	Knives Out	Won	
National Board of Review Awards	January 8, 2020	Best Ensemble	Knives Out	Won	
New York Film Critics Online Awards	December 7, 2019	Best Ensemble Cast	Mary Vernieu	Won	
Online Film Critics Society Awards	January 6, 2020	Best Picture	Knives Out	Nominated	
Online Film Critics Society Awards	January 6, 2020	Best Original Screenplay	Rian Johnson	Nominated	
Online Film Critics Society Awards	January 6, 2020	Best Acting Ensemble	Knives Out	Won	
Producers Guild of America Awards	January 18, 2020	Best Theatrical Motion Picture	Rian Johnson and Ram Bergman	Nominated	
San Francisco Bay Area Film Critics Circle Awards	December 16, 2019	Best Original Screenplay	Rian Johnson	Nominated	
Satellite Awards	December 19, 2019	Best Motion Picture – Musical or Comedy	Knives Out	Nominated	
Satellite Awards	December 19, 2019	Best Actor – Motion Picture Musical or Comedy	Daniel Craig	Nominated	
Satellite Awards	December 19, 2019	Best Actress – Motion Picture Musical or Comedy	Ana de Armas	Nominated	
Satellite Awards	December 19, 2019	Best Cast – Motion Picture	Knives Out	Won	
Saturn Awards	October 26, 2021	Best Thriller Film	Knives Out	Won	
Saturn Awards	October 26, 2021	Best Actor	Daniel Craig	Nominated	
Saturn Awards	October 26, 2021	Best Supporting Actor	Chris Evans	Nominated	
Saturn Awards	October 26, 2021	Best Supporting Actress	Ana de Armas	Won	
Saturn Awards	October 26, 2021	Best Supporting Actress	Jamie Lee Curtis	Nominated	
Saturn Awards	October 26, 2021	Best Editing	Bob Ducsay	Won	
Saturn Awards	October 26, 2021	Best Music	Nathan Johnson	Nominated	
Seattle Film Critics Society Awards	December 16, 2019	Best Ensemble Cast	Knives Out	Nominated	
Seattle Film Critics Society Awards	December 16, 2019	Best Screenplay	Rian Johnson	Nominated	
St. Louis Film Critics Association Awards	December 15, 2019	Best Comedy	Knives Out	Nominated	
Writers Guild of America Awards	February 1, 2020	Best Original Screenplay	Rian Johnson	Nominated	
Washington D.C. Area Film Critics Association Awards	December 8, 2019	Best Original Screenplay	Rian Johnson	Nominated	
Washington D.C. Area Film Critics Association Awards	December 8, 2019	Best Ensemble	Knives Out	Won	

== Sequels ==
Johnson was considering a sequel to Knives Out while the original film was still in theaters in 2019. Lionsgate announced plans to develop the sequel in February 2020, but in March 2021, Netflix acquired the rights for two sequels for $469 million. Although the terms of Lionsgate's distribution agreement gave the company bargaining leverage, Johnson and Bergman owned the film's intellectual property and pursued a new distribution deal following the COVID-19 pandemic, which severely hampered the immediate profitmaking viability of theaters. Knives Out was followed by Glass Onion: A Knives Out Mystery, which was released on Netflix on December 23, 2022, after a controversial one week platform theatrical rollout the previous November. In Glass Onion: A Knives Out Mystery, Blanc journeys to tech magnate Miles Bron's (Edward Norton) murder-mystery-themed retreat to mingle with his circle of friends but the event goes awry when two partygoers die in suspicious circumstances. Glass Onion fared well in media reviews.

A third film, Wake Up Dead Man, began development in 2023, which was briefly postponed as a result of that year's industry-wide labor strike by the Writers Guild of America. The film depicts Blanc uncovering a conspiracy behind the murder of an Upstate New York monsignor (Josh Brolin), whose death is erroneously blamed on a new priest in his parish (Josh O'Connor). After its November 2025 release in select theaters, Wake Up Dead Man premiered on Netflix on December 12. Further sequel development is pending as of 2025.
