= Brick (soundtrack) =

Soundtrack album by Various Artists
- Released: March 21, 2006
- Length: 1:12:07
- Label: Lakeshore Records

Brick: Original Motion Picture Soundtrack is the soundtrack to the 2005 film of the same name. It was released on March 21, 2006, by Lakeshore Records. The soundtrack features the original score for the film composed by Nathan Johnson, lead of The Cinematic Underground as well as music by The Velvet Underground, Bunny Berigan, Anton Karas and Kay Armen and a song from the Gilbert and Sullivan operetta The Mikado recited by Nora Zehetner that was featured in the film.

== Scoring process ==
This innovative score was composed by Nathan Johnson with additional support and music from The Cinematic Underground. The score harks back to the style, feel and overall texture of noir films. It features traditional instruments such as the piano, trumpet, and violin, but it also contains unique and invented instrument such as the wine-o-phone, metallophone, tack pianos, filing cabinets, and kitchen utensils, all recorded with one microphone on a battered PowerBook.

According to the audio commentary of the Brick DVD, the score was composed almost entirely over iChat, with Rian Johnson playing clips of the movie to Nathan Johnson, who would then score them.

== Track listing ==
1. "Emily's Theme" – Nathan Johnson
2. "Sister Ray" – The Velvet Underground
3. "The Sun Whose Rays Are All Ablaze" – Nora Zehetner
4. "Frankie and Johnny" – Bunny Berigan
5. "I'm in the Middle of a Riddle" – Anton Karas, Kay Armen
6. "Pale Blue Arrow" – Nathan Johnson
7. "Locker 269" – Nathan Johnson
8. "Kara's Theme (The Drama Vamp)" - China Kent
9. "Laura's Theme" – Nathan Johnson & China Kent
10. "The Pin in the Night" – Nathan Johnson, Chris Mears & China Kent
11. "Pie House Rats" – Seth Kent
12. "Emily's Theme 2 (The White Rabbit)" – Nathan Johnson
13. "Emily's Theme 3 (Lunch is Difficult)" – Nathan Johnson & China Kent
14. "The Dream and the Tunnel" – Nathan Johnson & Chris Mears
15. "Emily's Theme 6 (Reprise)" – Nathan Johnson
16. "A Show of Hands" – Nathan Johnson
17. "Minneapolis" – Nathan Johnson
18. "Front Page News" – Nathan Johnson
19. "Knives in My Eyes" – Nathan Johnson
20. "The Pin's Lair" – Nathan Johnson
21. "Laura's Theme 5 (You Trust Me Now)" – Nathan Johnson & China Kent
22. "Ultimate-Tims" – Nathan Johnson & China Kent
23. "Turning In" – Nathan Johnson
24. "The Pinivan" – Nathan Johnson & China Kent
25. "Dode's Threat/South of T-Street" – Nathan Johnson, Chris Mears, Steve Cowley & China Kent
26. "The Brick of Brock" – Nathan Johnson & China Kent
27. "Four O'Clock (Part 1)" – Nathan Johnson & Chris Mears
28. "The Field" – Nathan Johnson & China Kent
29. "The Tunnel" – Nathan Johnson & Chris Mears
30. "Tug's Tale (Part 2)" – Nathan Johnson & Chris Mears
31. "Kabuki Confrontation" – Nathan Johnson, Chris Mears & China Kent
32. "Showing Kara's Ace" – Nathan Johnson, Chris Mears & China Kent
33. "Four O'Clock (Part 2)" – Nathan Johnson & Chris Mears
34. "I'm Sorry Brendan" – Nathan Johnson
35. "The Physical Proxy" – Nathan Johnson & China Kent
36. "Pale Blue Arrow (Part 2)" – Nathan Johnson & China Kent
37. "Building to War" – Nathan Johnson & Chris Mears
38. "War" – Nathan Johnson & Chris Mears
39. "Laura's Theme (Reprise)" – Nathan Johnson & China Kent
40. "The Tale" – Nathan Johnson, China Kent, Chris Mears & Steve Cowley

== Credits ==
- Original Music Produced and Composed by: Nathan Johnson with The Cinematic Underground
- Music Editor: Drew Deascentis
- Music Supervisor: Joe Rudge
- Music Mixer: Aaron Johnson
- Executive Soundtrack Album Producers for Lakeshore Records: Skip Williamson and Brian McNelis
- Art Director: Stephanie Mente
- Layout by: Joe Chavez

== Reviews ==
Professional ratings
Review scores
Source	Rating
Soundtrack.net	4/5 stars

Jonathan Jarry from Soundtrack.net gave the score four stars saying, "This is a score that proudly stands on the fringe of what is called film music by most people. It will be hailed by its fans; it will be booed by the more conservative people among us. When all is said and done, however, how often are these polarizing scores composed and released? I say revel in Brick's insistent crave for originality before Hollywood hits us with yet another serving of reheated piano-and-strings crap."
