= The Cinematic Underground =

American alternative rock band

The Cinematic Underground are an alternative rock group, with members from the UK and the U.S. (Colorado). Their debut album, Annasthesia, is a "concept narrative" about risk and escape which follows two main characters through two days in an unnamed city. Fronted by Nathan Johnson, the group is more of an artistic collective than a band, with revolving members of family and friends from both sides of the Atlantic. In 2004 various members contributed to the junkyard score Brick for the film of the same name. In 2009 various members contributed to the score for the film The Brothers Bloom. In the autumn of 2005, the group relocated to Boston, Massachusetts in order to mount a year-long live touring production of the Annasthesia show. The show mixes projected images from Zachary Johnson's Annasthesia graphic novella with film, samples and a live concert.

One of their tracks from Brick, "Kara's Theme (The Drama Vamp)," is used regularly in the radio program This American Life.

== Members ==
- Nathan Johnson: writer, director, lead vocals, rhythm guitar
- Zachary Johnson: drums, illustration
- Bethany Johnson: harmony vocals
- Marke Johnson: guitar, graphic design, stage design, architecture
- Kimberly Johnson: director of materials & business management
- China Kent: keyboards, pianos, talk box
- Seth Kent: technical management, instrument repair and creation
- Chris Mears: guitar, metallophone, samples
- Chris Pedley: bass guitar
- Kate Scott: photographer
- Chris Jacobs: manager
- Joe Lanman: web designer, visuals
