= Nathan Johnson (musician) =

American film composer (born 1976)

- Born: August 4, 1976 (age 50); Washington, D.C., U.S.
- Occupations: Film composer, director
- Website: nathanj.com
- Relatives: Rian Johnson (cousin); Karina Longworth (cousin-in-law)

Nathan Tyler Johnson (born August 4, 1976) is an American film composer, director, and producer. He is best known for his collaborations with his cousin, director Rian Johnson, scoring all but one of his films.

== Early life ==
Johnson was born in Washington, D.C., and grew up in Colorado. After living in England in the mid-2000s, Johnson relocated to the East Coast of the U.S., where he launched a live touring project with his band, The Cinematic Underground. His work with the band opened up doors into film composing, and his first musical score was for the award-winning film Brick.

== Career ==
=== Composing ===
In 2005, Johnson composed the score to the neo-noir film Brick, which was written and directed by his paternal cousin Rian Johnson. The score features traditional instruments such as the piano, trumpet and violin, and also contains unique and invented instruments such as the wine-o-phone, metallophone, treated pianos, filing cabinets, and kitchen utensils. The entire score was recorded in Littlehampton at a residential studio, hosted by Paul Burton (who went on to create Chapel Studios in Chichester), using a single microphone and a PowerBook computer. The score was hailed by The Chicago Tribune as "perhaps the most arresting soundtrack of the year to date" and Johnson was nominated for the Satellite award for Best Original Score from the International Press Academy.

Johnson finished the score for Rian Johnson's second film, The Brothers Bloom (2008), expanding the palette used in Brick to include strings and woodwinds for the sound of a "back porch orchestra".

Members of The Cinematic Underground have been involved with all of Johnson's scores. As well as producing the music for Brick and The Brothers Bloom, Johnson has produced albums for The Cinematic Underground, Faux Fix, Magik*Magik, and New Volunteer.

In 2012, Johnson composed the score for Rian Johnson's critically acclaimed third film, Looper. Much of the score was created using found-sounds and field recordings, which Johnson recorded while on location in New Orleans as the film was being shot. He and his team incorporated treadmills, industrial fans, and slamming car doors, along with a more traditional orchestral ensemble, and he received the IFMCA Breakthrough Composer award for his genre-bending work on the film.

Through his collaborations with Rian Johnson, he then teamed up with Joseph Gordon-Levitt (who starred in Brick and Looper) to score Gordon-Levitt's directorial debut Don Jon (2013). He since composed the music for Rian Johnson's Knives Out (2019) and Glass Onion (2022).

In 2014, Johnson composed the score for Jake Paltrow's science fiction action film Young Ones and also served as an executive producer on the film.

Johnson also contributed to the soundtrack for the PlayStation 4-exclusive video game Infamous Second Son (received the nomination Original Dramatic Score, Franchise at the 2014 NAVGTR Awards, shared with Bryan Mantia and Marc Canham) and a stand-alone DLC to the game titled Infamous First Light.

=== Directing ===
Along with composing for film, Johnson has directed a number of music videos. In 2015, he created the much-lauded video for Son Lux's "Change Is Everything", which won the award for Best Alternative Video - Budget at the UK Music Video Awards, and was an official selection at numerous festivals, including SXSW. The stop-motion video was created using 200 push pins and 500 feet of rubberized thread. It took a month to make, and combines stop-motion techniques with projected rotoscopes. NPR premiered the clip, calling it "mind blowing", The A.V. Club called it "powerfully hypnotic", and it was subsequently featured at the 2016 TED conference. NPR also released a making-of video that details the arduous process.

Later that year, he directed Tatiana Maslany and Noah Segan in the official video for You Don't Know Me. The video explores themes of ritual as seen in domestic relationships and religion. As The A.V. Club noted, it "finds Maslany trapped in the numbing routines of a modern relationship with a partner (Noah Segan) oblivious to her empty feeling. Soon, we’re cutting to a mysterious facility where Maslany holds sway over obedient followers—but, oddly, these rituals soon start to look just as hollow and meaningless as the ones she’s stuck with at home."

In 2016, Johnson worked with Jess Wolfe and Holly Laessig of the popular indie pop band Lucius to direct their music video for "Gone Insane". This video was created using an intervalometer and over 3,000 still photographs. Johnson enlisted special effects makeup artist Jim Ojala to create a series of prosthetics which would be used to create the effect of Wolfe's face stretching like silly putty. The video received notable mainstream recognition, with Rolling Stone describing the effects as "strange [and] striking" and the Village Voice calling them "exceptional".

For the release of Son Lux's Brighter Wounds album, Johnson re-teamed with Tatiana Maslany and Tom Cullen to direct a 10 minute short film that uses the ancient story of Abraham and Isaac as an unsettling exploration into dogma and doubt. The video features cinematography by Steve Yedlin and was nominated for Best Music Video and Best Cinematography in a Music Video at the prestigious Camerimage festival.

=== Graphic design and photography ===
Johnson is also a member of a small design workshop called The Made Shop. He created the album cover for How to Save a Life by The Fray as well as their follow up album artwork which was a collaboration with brother and founder of The Made Shop, Marke Johnson. Together, they have created the artwork for numerous albums, including We Are Rising, Bones, and Brighter Wounds by Son Lux.

== Bands ==
Johnson is the founder of The Cinematic Underground, an art-pop collective that combines storytelling and graphic novel-style artwork with live performance. After relocating from England in 2005, Johnson brought together many of the original players to create a live touring production. In the Spring of 2006, The Cinematic Underground toured thirty-five cities in the U.S. with its stage production, Anesthesia.

He is also in the band Faux Fix along with singer Katie Chastain, and has produced albums for New Volunteer, Zut Alors, and The Magik*Magik Orchestra, among others.

== Other projects ==
Johnson is a founding member of The Echo Society, a Los Angeles-based collective of composers, visual designers and engineers. The group has put on multiple events in various locations throughout Los Angeles featuring large orchestral ensembles mixed with electronic music. The group features founding composers Rob Simonsen, Joseph Trapanese, Jeremy Zuckerman, Benjamin Wynn, Eskmo, and Judson Crane, as well as sound engineer Satoshi Noguchi and visual artist Effixx.

== Filmography ==
=== As a composer ===
Year	Film	Notes
2005	Brick	First collaboration with Rian Johnson
2008	The Brothers Bloom	
2011	The Day I Saw Your Heart	
2012	Looper	
2013	Don Jon	First collaboration with Joseph Gordon-Levitt
2014	Young Ones	Also executive producer
2014	Kill the Messenger	
2019	Knives Out	
2021	Mr. Corman	8 episodes
2021	Nightmare Alley	Replaced Alexandre Desplat
2022	Glass Onion	
2025	Wake Up Dead Man	

=== As a director ===
Year	Film	Director	Writer	Editor	Notes
2008	"Snowshow"	Yes	Yes	Yes	Music video for Katie Chastain
2014	"Change Is Everything"	Yes	Yes	Yes	Music video for Son Lux
2014	"You Don't Know Me"	Yes	Yes	Yes	Music video for Son Lux
2015	"Gone Insane"	Yes	Yes	Yes	Music video for Lucius
2016	"Weep"	Yes	Yes	Yes	Music video for Magik*Magik
2018	All Directions	Yes	Yes	Yes	Short for Son Lux
2018	"Caught in the Chamber"	Yes	Yes	Yes	Music video for yMusic
