= Looper (film) =

2012 film by Rian Johnson

- Theatrical release poster
- Directed by: Rian Johnson
- Written by: Rian Johnson
- Produced by: Ram Bergman; James D. Stern
- Starring: Bruce Willis; Joseph Gordon-Levitt; Emily Blunt; Paul Dano; Noah Segan; Piper Perabo; Jeff Daniels
- Cinematography: Steve Yedlin
- Edited by: Bob Ducsay
- Music by: Nathan Johnson
- Production companies: Endgame Entertainment; DMG Entertainment; Ram Bergman Productions
- Distributed by: TriStar Pictures (Note: Distributed through Sony Pictures Releasing in partnership with FilmDistrict.) (United States); FilmNation Entertainment (International)
- Release dates: September 6, 2012 (TIFF); September 28, 2012 (United States)
- Running time: 118 minutes
- Country: United States
- Language: English
- Budget: $30 million
- Box office: $176.5 million

Looper is a 2012 American science fiction thriller film written and directed by Rian Johnson, and produced by Ram Bergman and James D. Stern. It stars Bruce Willis, Joseph Gordon-Levitt, and Emily Blunt. It revolves around "present-day" contract killers called "loopers" whose targets are sent back through time by criminal syndicates from the future.

Looper was selected as the opening film of the 2012 Toronto International Film Festival and was released in the United States on September 28, 2012, by a partnership between TriStar Pictures and FilmDistrict. The film received critical acclaim and was a box office success, grossing $176 million worldwide on a $30 million budget.

== Plot ==
In 2044, 25-year-old Joe works for a Kansas City crime syndicate as an assassin or "looper". Since tracking systems in the future of 2074 have made it nearly impossible to dispose of bodies undetected, the syndicate sends its enemies back in time to be executed. Managed by a man from the future named Abe, loopers kill and dispose of victims whose faces are concealed, recovering silver bars attached to their targets as payment. To hide connections to the syndicate, any loopers who survive until 2074 are sent back and killed by their own younger selves, referred to as "closing the loop". These targets are identified by gold bars instead of silver, marking the end of the looper's contract.

Joe's friend Seth comes to see him after Seth fails to kill his future self. Old Seth escaped after warning Seth that a jawless telekinetic called "The Rainmaker" would overthrow the five major bosses and close all loops. Joe reluctantly hides Seth in his apartment's floor safe, but later reveals Seth's location after Abe threatens to confiscate half of Joe's saved silver. Abe's elite "Gat Men" capture Seth, carve an address into his arm, and begin severing his body parts surgically. These effects appear on Old Seth's body. He then goes to the address on his arm and is killed by Kid Blue, one of the Gat Men.

When Joe's next target arrives, it is his older self, but with his face uncovered and hands unbound. Old Joe knocks him out and escapes. Returning to his apartment and finding it ransacked by the Gat Men, Joe fights with Kid Blue, falls off a fire escape, and blacks out.

In another timeline, Joe does kill his older self. He moves to Shanghai, but burns through his funds in 6 years, due to his drug addiction and wild party life. Broke, he becomes a hitman. Seventeen years later, he marries and breaks the addiction with his wife's help. Three years after that, his wife is killed when Joe is taken to close the loop. Overpowering his captors, Old Joe sends himself back to 2044, altering his history by evading Joe and escaping.

Old Joe experiences vague memories of Joe's actions in the present and meets his younger self at a diner. He wants to save his wife by killing The Rainmaker as a child. He acquires a map from a local library using numbers written on his hand that supposedly pertain to the Rainmaker's identity. Kid Blue and the Gat Men appear, and a gunfight ensues. Both Joes escape with pieces of the map.

Joe follows the map to a farm where a woman named Sara lives with her young son Cid. Sara recognizes the numbers on the map as Cid's birthday and the location of the hospital where he was born. Joe deduces that Old Joe plans to kill all three children who were born at that hospital on the same day, not knowing which one will become the Rainmaker.

Jesse, a Gat Man, comes to the farm, but Cid helps Joe hide. Later that night, Sara and Joe have sex, and Sara reveals that while she has above-average telekinetic powers, Cid's abilities are far stronger. In the morning, Joe wakes to find Jesse holding Sara at gunpoint. Cid kills Jesse using telekinesis. Joe realizes that Cid will become The Rainmaker and that Old Joe will now know this.

Kid Blue captures Old Joe and takes him to Abe. Old Joe breaks free, killing Abe and his henchmen, and goes to Sara's farm, followed by Kid Blue. While Joe kills Kid Blue, Old Joe pursues Sara and Cid. When Cid's face is grazed by a bullet, Sara calms him before he can react and kill anyone. She sends Cid into a sugarcane field and positions herself to block Old Joe's line of fire. Joe realizes that if Old Joe kills Sara, an orphaned, traumatized Cid with lethal powers will grow up to become The Rainmaker. So, Joe kills himself, erasing Old Joe's existence, saving Sara and preventing Cid from becoming The Rainmaker.

== Cast ==
- Bruce Willis as Old Joe
- Joseph Gordon-Levitt as Joe
- Emily Blunt as Sara
- Paul Dano as Seth
- Noah Segan as Kid Blue
- Piper Perabo as Suzie
- Summer Qing as Old Joe's wife
- Jeff Daniels as Abe
- Pierce Gagnon as Cid
- Garret Dillahunt as Jesse

== Production ==
=== Development and casting ===
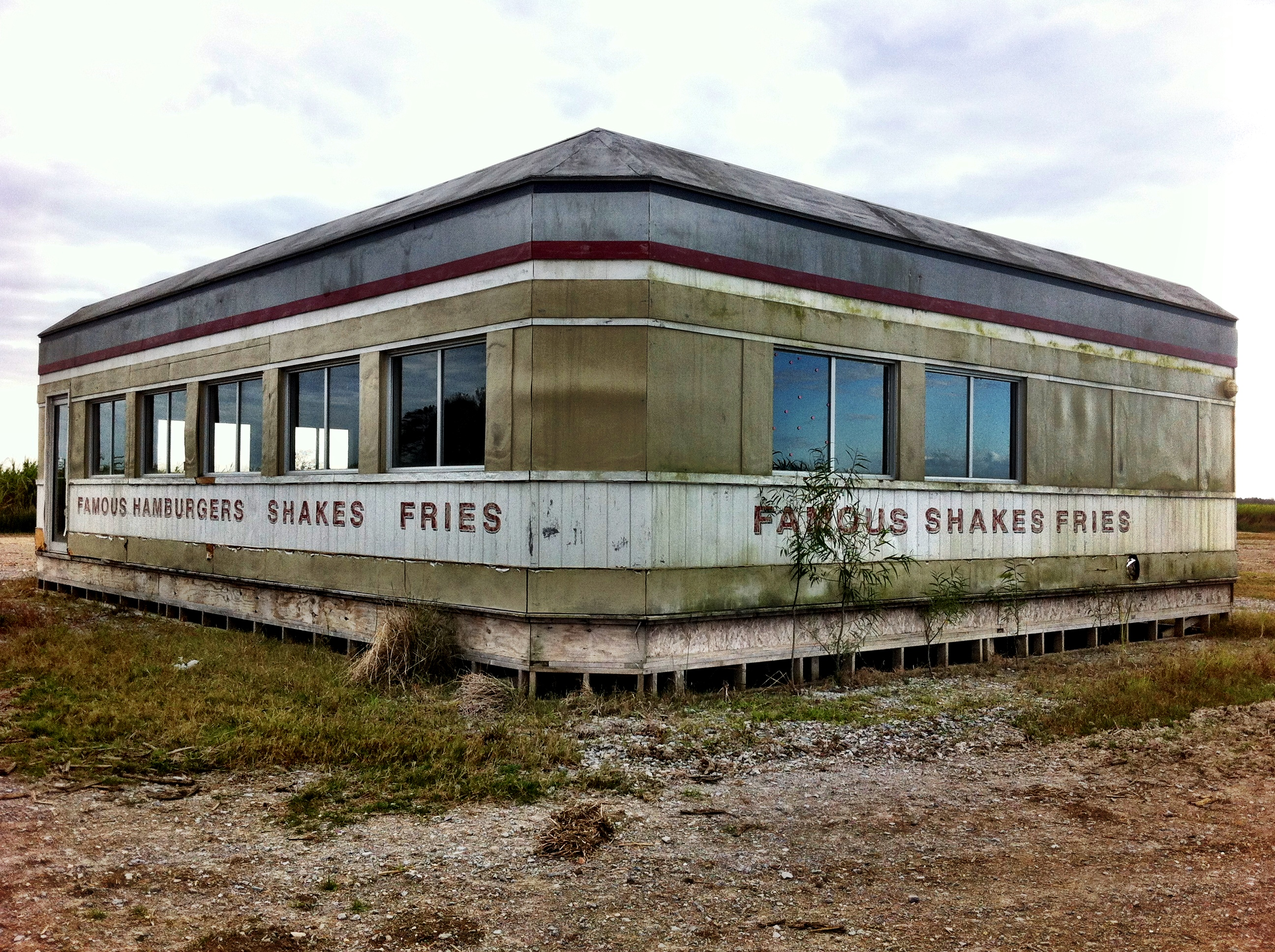
Film set diner constructed for the film in Assumption Parish, Louisiana

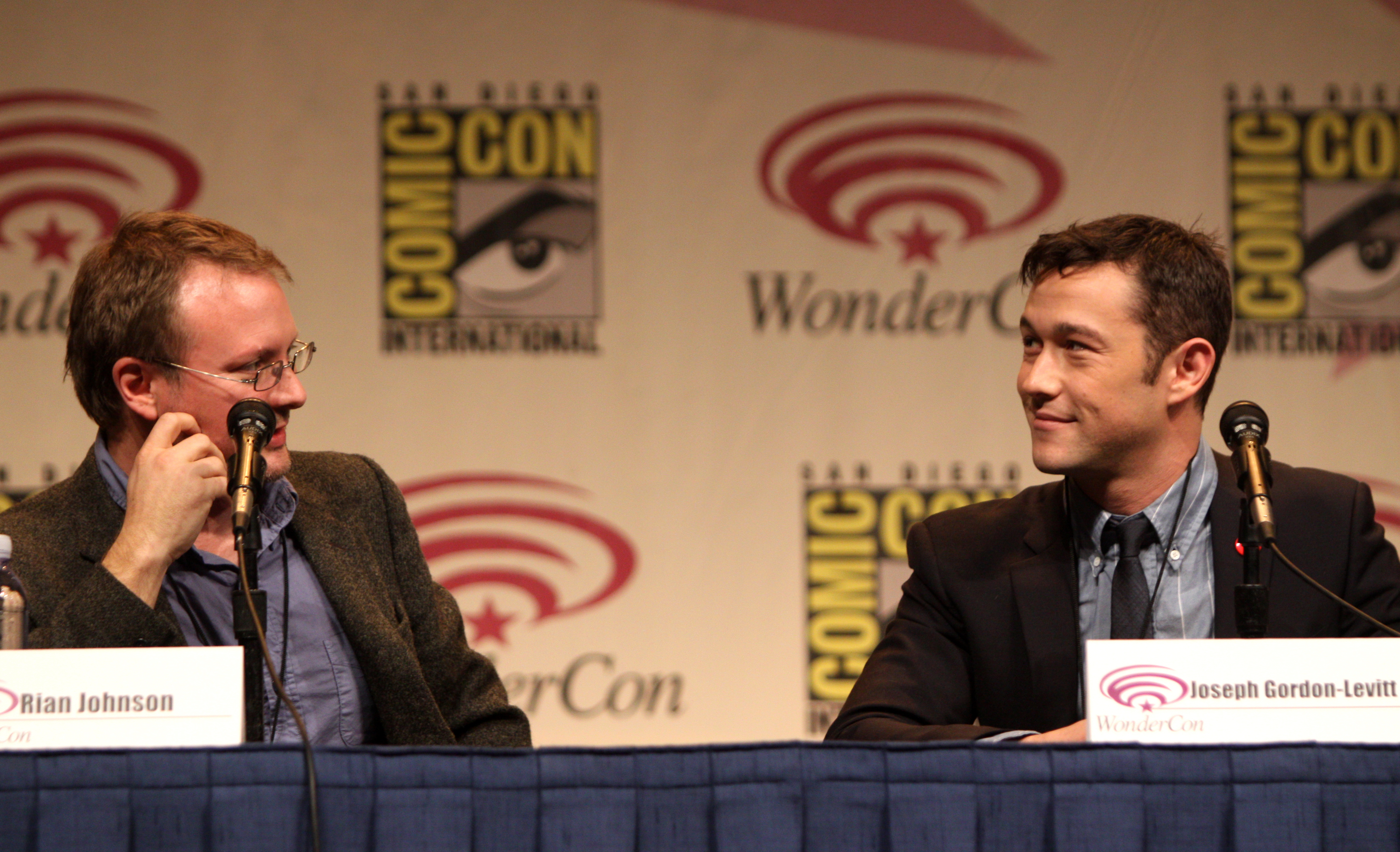
Rian Johnson and Joseph Gordon-Levitt speaking at WonderCon 2012 in promotion of Looper

Looper was written and directed by Rian Johnson, originally conceived as a short film starring Joseph Gordon-Levitt, shortly after making Brick, Johnson's first feature. After Johnson released The Brothers Bloom in 2008, he re-teamed with producer Ram Bergman, who produced Johnson's previous two films, with the goal of starting production of Looper in 2009. In May 2010, Gordon-Levitt was cast in one of the lead roles, which he would play after completing Premium Rush. Later in the month, Bruce Willis was also cast. In the following October, Emily Blunt joined Gordon-Levitt and Willis. Noah Segan, Jeff Daniels and Piper Perabo were cast in January 2011.

=== Filming ===
Filming began in Louisiana on January 24, 2011.

Makeup artist Kazuhiro Tsuji created the prosthetics that Gordon-Levitt wore in the film so that he would physically resemble Willis.

=== Post-production ===
Talking about Looper and time travel in film, Rian Johnson said:

Even though it's a time-travel movie, the pleasure of it doesn't come from the mass of time travel. It's not a film like Primer, for instance, where the big part of the enjoyment is kind of working out all the intricacies of it. For Looper, I very much wanted it to be a more character-based movie that is more about how these characters dealt with the situation time travel has brought about. So the biggest challenge was figuring out how to not spend the whole movie explaining the rules and figure out how to put it out there in a way that made sense on some intuitive level for the audience; then get past it and deal with the real meat of the story.

Other influences cited by Rian Johnson include The Terminator, Witness, Akira, Domu: A Child's Dream, 12 Monkeys, Timecrimes, and Hard-Boiled Wonderland and the End of the World.

== Music ==
=== About the Composer ===
The film's score was composed by Nathan Johnson, Rian Johnson's cousin.

=== Recorded-Object Technique ===
Johnson utilized random-objects for a significant portion of his soundtrack. He wanted drums to be the central instrument of the movies soundtrack, but did not feel that normal drum kits had chemistry with the vibe of the movie. He created custom drum kits with random objects. Starting with prop pistols, Johnson recorded "all the little sounds that a gun makes" and turned each one into a different drum in the set. With the help of percussionist Chris Mears, he recorded in a parking garage to make a kettle drum with slamming car doors as the sound, saying the garage provided the perfect reverb.

== Release ==
=== Theatrical ===
Looper premiered on September 6, 2012, at the opening night of the Toronto International Film Festival. The film was then released theatrically in the United States on September 28, 2012, by FilmDistrict, who obtained the domestic rights from production company Endgame Entertainment at the 2011 Cannes Film Festival. In turn, FilmDistrict chose to release the film with Sony Pictures, over their genre label TriStar Pictures.

The Chinese release of the film reintegrates a substantial number of scenes set in Shanghai. The move was requested by Chinese production company DMG Entertainment in order to further appeal to Chinese audiences. Several of these scenes were shortened or cut for the American release.

Johnson released a free audio commentary on SoundCloud (which was heavily requested after making one for The Brothers Bloom) to be downloaded and listened to in the theater while watching the film. The commentary was not targeted at new viewers, and Johnson's message accompanying the track warned "Needless to say, this is NOT to be listened to on a first viewing, or before you've seen the film."

=== Home media ===
The film was released on Blu-ray and DVD in North America on December 31, 2012. The film was also released on January 28, 2013, in online UK stores, with a general release on February 4, 2013. The film made $20,583,583 in domestic DVD sales and $11,468,974 from domestic Blu-ray sales for a total of $32,052,557. The film was remastered for an Ultra HD Blu-ray release in 2021.

== Reception ==
=== Box office ===
Looper opened on September 28, 2012, in 2,992 theaters in North America and grossed $20,801,522 in its opening weekend averaging $6,952 per theater and ranking #2 at the box office. The widest release of the film in the U.S was 2,993 theaters and it ended up earning $66.5 million domestically and $110 million internationally for a total of $176.5 million, against its $30 million production budget.

=== Critical response ===
On the review aggregator website Rotten Tomatoes, 93% of 275 critics' reviews are positive, with an average rating of 8.1/10. The website's consensus reads: "As thought-provoking as it is thrilling, Looper delivers an uncommonly smart, bravely original blend of futuristic sci-fi and good old-fashioned action." On Metacritic the film has a weighted average score of 84 out of 100, based on 44 critics, indicating "universal acclaim". Audiences polled by CinemaScore gave the film an average grade of "B" on an A+ to F scale.

James Mottram of Total Film gave Looper 5 stars out of 5, concluding that it was "the best sci-fi movie since Moon. The best time-travel yarn since 12 Monkeys. And one of the best films of 2012."

Todd McCarthy of The Hollywood Reporter gave the film a positive review, calling it "an engaging, neatly worked-out time-travel sci-fi thriller", but also criticizing the effects involved in making Gordon-Levitt resemble Willis: "At first, the effect is a bit odd, and you can't quite put your finger on what's off; then it feels downright weird to be looking at a version of Gordon-Levitt who is no longer the actor you've known for a few years now."

Peter Debruge of Variety also gave the film a positive review, writing that writer-director Johnson's "grandly conceived, impressively mounted third feature shows a giddy, geeky interest in science-fiction, then forces it into the back seat and lets the multidimensional characters drive. In a genre infamous for loose ends, this thinking man's thriller marshals action, romance and a dose of very dark comedy toward a stunning payoff."

Kim Newman of Empire magazine gave Looper 5 stars out of 5, writing, "Intelligent science-fiction sometimes seems an endangered species—too much physics and there's a risk of creating something cold and remote, too many explosions and get lost in the multiplex. Looper isn't perfect, but it pulls off the full Wizard Of Oz: it has a brain, courage and a heart." Noel Murray of The A.V. Club gave the film an A− grade, writing, "Looper is a remarkable feat of imagination and execution, entertaining from start to finish, even as it asks the audience to contemplate how and why humanity keeps making the same rotten mistakes." Kenneth Turan of the Los Angeles Times gave the film a positive review, writing, "Looper is way inventive but it wears its creativity lightly, like it's no big deal. This is a highflying, super-stylish science-fiction thriller that brings a fresh approach to mind-bending genre material. We're not always sure where this time-travel film is going, but we wouldn't dream of abandoning the ride."

Claudia Puig of USA Today gave the film 3.5 stars out of 4, writing, "Looper's heady blend of time travel, gritty action and a jot of romance is such a thrilling and cerebral mind-bender that it will likely have moviegoers gathering outside the theater afterward to hash out details of its intricately constructed universe. Not that that's a bad thing." Peter Travers of Rolling Stone also gave the film 3.5 stars out of 4, praising the performances of Willis and Gordon-Levitt and concluding, "Lacing tremendously exciting action with touching gravity, Looper hits you like a shot in the heart." Roger Ebert of the Chicago Sun-Times also gave the film 3.5 stars out of 4, praising its screenplay, stating "Looper, a smart and tricky sci-fi story, sidesteps the paradoxes of time travel by embracing them. Most time travel movies run into trouble in the final scenes, when impossibilities pile up one upon another. This film leads to a startling conclusion that wipes out the story's paradoxes so neatly it's as if it never happened."

Lisa Schwarzbaum of Entertainment Weekly gave the film a B+ grade, writing, "The time swivels in Looper evoke some of Inception's fancy temporal tricks (some of which, of course, also involved Gordon-Levitt straddling multiple time zones at once). But it's the glimpses of Children of Men-like societal dystopia that give the movie its real weight". Keith Staskiewicz, also writing for Entertainment Weekly (reviewing the DVD) and also giving a "B+", said, "The film's premise is markedly inventive, and [writer-director Rian] Johnson spends a lot of time making his universe seem lived-in and believable, but he's not just concerned with whiz-bang what-ifs. The showdown of selves illuminates just how little Gordon-Levitt's character has changed over the intervening years, stuck as he is in a feedback loop of drug use and violence despite his pipe dream of moving to Europe. The retro trench coats and firearms also suggest a sort of eternal recurrence, and as Looper's plot gets more complex, its central question simplifies: If we can't fix our mistakes, can we at least make sure we don't repeat the same ones over and over again?"

Richard Corliss of Time magazine gave the film a positive review, calling Looper a "hybrid, mashing Quentin Tarantino and Philip K. Dick into a species of pulp science fiction" and also writing, "A fanciful film with the patina of hyper-realism, Looper is well served by actors who behave not as if they were dropped carelessly into the future but spent their whole desperate lives there." Dana Stevens of Slate gave the film a mixed review, writing, "Looper felt to me like a maddening near-miss: It posits an impossible but fascinating-to-imagine relationship – a face-to-face encounter between one's present and future self, in which each self must account for its betrayal of the other – and then throws away nearly all the dramatic potential that relationship offers."

=== Accolades ===
Award	Nominees	Result
National Board of Review Award for Best Original Screenplay	Rian Johnson	Won
Washington D.C. Area Film Critics Association Award for Best Original Screenplay	Rian Johnson	Won
Critics' Choice Movie Award for Best Original Screenplay	Rian Johnson	Nominated
Critics' Choice Movie Award for Best Sci-Fi/Horror Movie	Looper	Won
Chicago Film Critics Association Award for Best Original Screenplay	Rian Johnson	Nominated
Houston Film Critics Society Original Screenplay	Rian Johnson	Nominated
Austin Film Critics Association Original Screenplay	Rian Johnson	Won
Florida Film Critics Circle Original Screenplay	Rian Johnson	Won
Online Film Critics Society Original Screenplay	Rian Johnson	Nominated
Hugo Award for Best Dramatic Presentation, Long Form	Rian Johnson	Nominated
Young Artist Award for Best Performance in a Feature Film - Supporting Young Actor Ten and Under	Pierce Gagnon	Nominated

=== Top ten lists ===
The film was included in the following top ten lists for the best films of 2012:

Publication	Rank
ReelViews	1
MTV	3
The Skinny	4
Total Film	9
The Huffington Post	10
The Atlantic Wire	N/A
Christianity Today	8
