= Ram Bergman =

Israeli film producer

- רם ברגמן
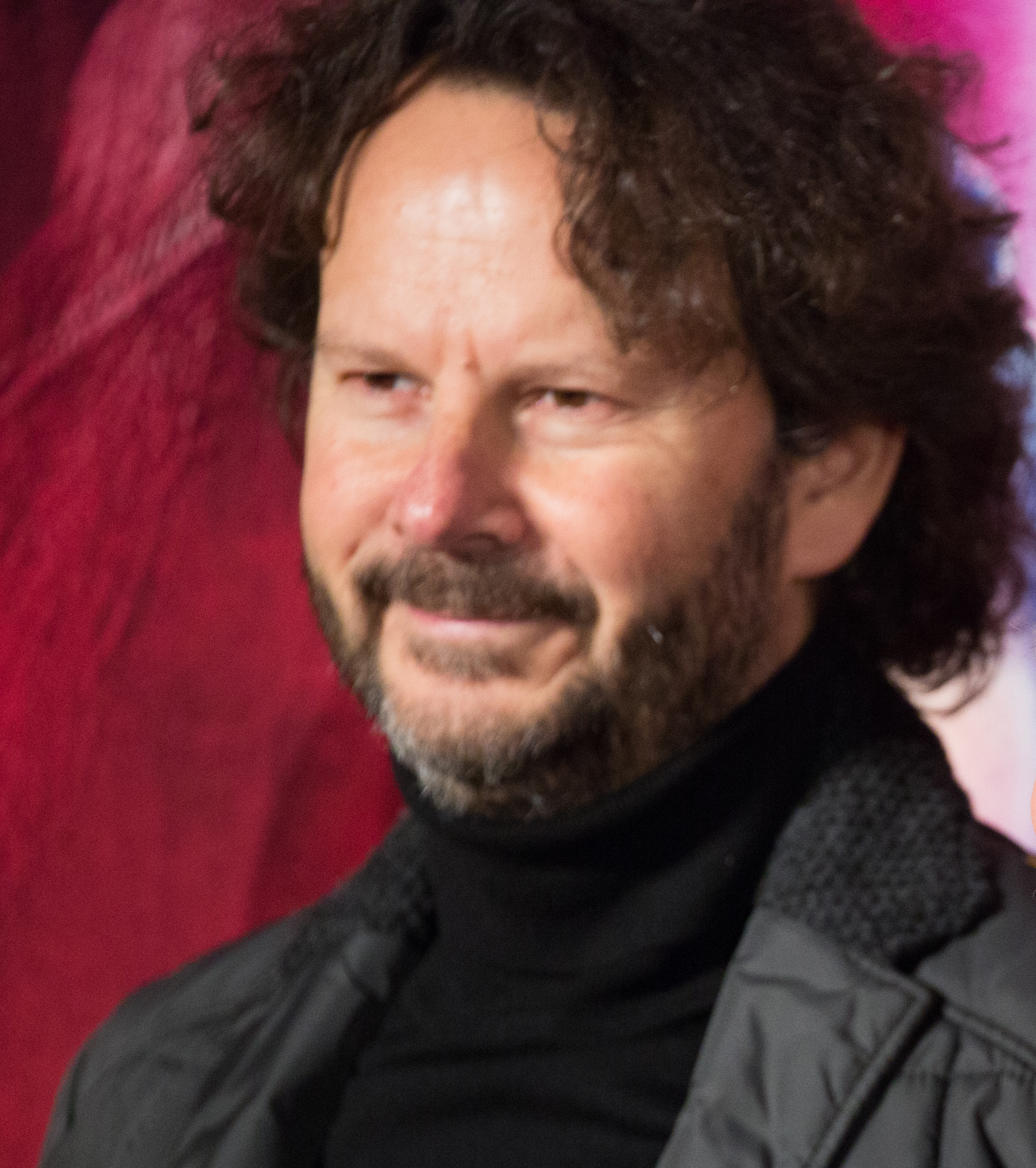
- Bergman in 2017
- Born: Rishon LeZion, Israel
- Occupation: Film producer
- Years active: 1994–present

Ram Bergman (Hebrew: רם ברגמן) is an Israeli film producer. He is known for producing Brick (2005), The Brothers Bloom (2008), Looper (2012), Star Wars: The Last Jedi (2017), and Knives Out (2019), all of which were written and directed by Rian Johnson.

Bergman received an Achievement in Film Award at the 2018 Israel Film Festival and was nominated for Outstanding Producer of Theatrical Motion Pictures for Knives Out at the 2020 Producers Guild of America Awards.

== Early life ==
Bergman was born and raised in Rishon LeZion, Israel.

== Career ==
Bergman first began producing films during his early 20s, having moved from his native Rishon LeZion in Israel to initially New York and then Los Angeles, in 1991. He had no formal training, just a passion for the film industry and a willingness to keep at it. He worked as a valet, while also “trying to figure out how to make movies” and within the year he was producing his first film, learning his trade while on the job.

Bergman met writer-director Rian Johnson while Johnson was attempting to make Brick. Bergman recalls: "Rian had been trying to make this movie for seven years after he got out of school and when I read the script, I realized I'd never seen anything like this." With Bergman's help, Johnson was able to get the movie made for significantly less money. Describing their relationship, Bergman says "You don’t think when you start out what it could lead to. You just focus on making the movie, but today we are partners and I think I'll be the luckiest man if I can continue making movies with him for the rest of my life."

Bergman produced The Last Jedi (2017), the second film in the Star Wars sequel trilogy. This again reunited him with Rian Johnson.

In September 2019, Johnson and Bergman launched the production company T-Street Productions that will generate original content for film and TV shows. The venture is fully capitalized by global media company Valence Media. T-Street launched with a first look deal with Valence Media's Media Rights Capital for film and television projects. Valence Media holds a substantial minority equity stake in the company. Johnson and Bergman intend to make their own original creations through the company, and produce others.

== Filmography ==
Producer

- Rave Review (1994)
- Power 98 (1996)
- Wedding Bell Blues (1996)
- Black and White (1999)
- Partners in Crime (2000)
- Stranger than Fiction (2000)
- Dancing at the Blue Iguana (2000)
- Zoe (2001)
- Kill Me Later (2001)
- Heartbreak Hospital (2002)
- Tough Luck (2003)
- In the Land of Widows (2004)
- Brick (2005)
- The Circle (2005)
- Nomad (2005)
- Conversations with Other Women (2005)
- Her Name Is Carla (2005)
- Relative Strangers (2006)
- The Brothers Bloom (2008)
- The Chameleon (2010)
- Bunraku (2010)
- Seeking Justice (2011)
- Looper (2012)
- Don Jon (2013)
- A Tale of Love and Darkness (2015)
- Self/less (2015)
- Papillon (2017)
- Star Wars: The Last Jedi (2017)
- Knives Out (2019)
- Glass Onion (2022)
- Wake Up Dead Man (2025)
- 2034 (TBA)

Executive producer

- For Hire (1998) (Co-executive producer)
- Long Time Since (1998)
- Under the Same Moon (2007)
- Cat Run (2011)
- A Good Old Fashioned Orgy (2011)
- Fair Play (2023)
- American Fiction (2023)
