= Steve Yedlin =

American cinematographer (born 1975)

- Born: Steven Mark Yedlin; September 29, 1975 (age 50); Los Angeles, California, U.S.
- Education: USC School of Cinematic Arts
- Years active: 1995–present
- Organization: American Society of Cinematographers
- Website: yedlin.net

Steven Mark Yedlin, ASC (born September 29, 1975) is an American cinematographer, best known for his collaboration with director Rian Johnson.

Yedlin is a member of the American Society of Cinematographers since 2015.

== Filmography ==
=== Film ===
Year	Title	Director	Notes
2002	May	Lucky McKee	
2004	Toolbox Murders	Tobe Hooper	
2004	Dead Birds	Alex Turner	
2005	Brick	Rian Johnson	
2005	Conversations with Other Women	Hans Canosa	
2006	Unknown	Simón Brand	
2006	Altered	Eduardo Sánchez	
2007	El Muerto	Brian Cox	
2007	Lovely by Surprise	Kirt Gunn	
2008	American Violet	Tim Disney	
2008	The Brothers Bloom	Rian Johnson	
2009	The Other Woman	Don Roos	
2009	Tenure	Mike Million	
2010	Father of Invention	Trent Cooper	
2012	Looper	Rian Johnson	
2012	Girl Most Likely	Shari Springer Berman; Robert Pulcini	
2013	Carrie	Kimberly Peirce	
2015	Danny Collins	Dan Fogelman	
2015	San Andreas	Brad Peyton	
2017	Star Wars: The Last Jedi	Rian Johnson	
2019	Knives Out	Rian Johnson	
2022	Glass Onion	Rian Johnson	
2024	Winner	Susanna Fogel	
2025	Wake Up Dead Man	Rian Johnson	
2026	You Deserve Each Other	Abby Kohn; Marc Silverstein	
2027	Beach Read †	Yulin Kuang	Filming

=== Television ===
Year	Title	Director	Notes
2023	Poker Face	Rian Johnson	Episodes "Dead Man's Hand" and "Escape from Shit Mountain"
