= The Brothers Bloom =

2008 caper comedy-drama film by Rian Johnson

- Theatrical release poster
- Directed by: Rian Johnson
- Written by: Rian Johnson
- Produced by: Ram Bergman; Wendy Japhet; James D. Stern
- Starring: Rachel Weisz; Adrien Brody; Mark Ruffalo; Rinko Kikuchi; Maximilian Schell; Robbie Coltrane
- Cinematography: Steve Yedlin
- Edited by: Gabriel Wrye
- Music by: Nathan Johnson
- Production company: Endgame Entertainment
- Distributed by: Summit Entertainment (United States and Canada); The Weinstein Company (International)
- Release dates: September 9, 2008 (TIFF); May 15, 2009 (United States)
- Running time: 114 minutes
- Country: United States
- Language: English
- Budget: $20 million
- Box office: $5.5 million

The Brothers Bloom is a 2008 American caper comedy-drama film written and directed by Rian Johnson. The film stars Rachel Weisz, Adrien Brody, Mark Ruffalo, Rinko Kikuchi, Maximilian Schell, and Robbie Coltrane. The film went into wide release in May 2009.

== Plot ==
The Brothers Bloom, orphaned at a young age, grow up in a series of foster homes. Thirteen-year-old Stephen dreams up an elaborate scenario to encourage his younger brother, Bloom, to talk to a girl, and the plan becomes their first confidence trick.

Twenty-five years later, the brothers are successful con men, and celebrate the end of a job in Berlin with their accomplice and explosives expert, Bang Bang. Bloom longs for an "unwritten life" beyond Stephen's schemes, and the brothers go their separate ways. Three months later, Stephen finds Bloom in Montenegro and convinces him to execute one final con: their target is Penelope Stamp, a wealthy heiress living alone in her New Jersey mansion.

Bloom inserts himself into Penelope's isolated life by running into her sports car on a bicycle, and they bond over her eccentric array of hobbies, including various musical instruments, chainsaw juggling, and pinhole photography. Exploiting Penelope's loneliness and craving for adventure, Bloom masquerades as an antiques dealer leaving for Europe, and Penelope arrives at the harbor to sail with the brothers and Bang Bang to Greece.

As part of the con, Melville, a Belgian black marketeer hired by Stephen, tells Penelope that the brothers are smugglers and offers them an illicit job: in exchange for $1 million, he will procure a rare book in Prague for them to sell for $2.5 million. Penelope is thrilled and "convinces" the brothers to accept, and Bloom and Penelope struggle with their mutual attraction, but Stephen warns that the con will fail if Bloom actually falls for Penelope.

In Prague, Bloom is approached by the brothers' mentor-turned-enemy, Diamond Dog, but Stephen attacks Diamond Dog with a broken bottle, warning him to stay away. Melville disappears with Penelope's $1 million, according to plan, but she is determined to complete the job. The brothers arrange for her to steal the fake book from Prague Castle, where a mixup with Bang Bang's explosives leads to Penelope being caught, but she talks her way out of police custody.

They go to Mexico to complete the "sale", but Bloom has fallen in love with Penelope and reveals her adventure has been a sham. Preparing to flee together, they are confronted by Stephen; the brothers fight and a gun accidentally discharges, mortally wounding Stephen. Realizing the blood is fake and this was yet another ruse, Penelope leaves broken-hearted. Bloom punches Stephen and leaves for Montenegro once again.

Three months later, Penelope reunites with Bloom, who is unable to deny his love for her but unwilling to let her become a con artist herself. He meets with Stephen and Bang Bang, preparing to finish the con and fake their own deaths. They go to St. Petersburg, where Stephen has arranged to "sell" the book to Diamond Dog, who will pose as a Russian mobster, but they are ambushed by Diamond Dog's men. Stephen is kidnapped and Bang Bang's car explodes, leaving Penelope and Bloom uncertain whether she has faked her death.

A $1.75 million ransom demand leads Bloom to suspect this is another of Stephen's tricks, but Penelope wires the money. Arriving at an abandoned theater, Bloom finds Stephen badly beaten and held at gunpoint, and a phone call from Diamond Dog confirms that he has double-crossed the brothers. Bloom shoots first, forcing the gunman to flee, but Stephen takes a bullet for Bloom and collapses. Bloom asks whether this was real, and Stephen leaps to his feet, assuring his brother that he is fine, and tells him to go on the run with Penelope and that they will meet again.

Driving away with Penelope, Bloom discovers that the bloodstains on his shirt have oxidized, revealing that his brother's blood was real. Stephen dies peacefully, having pulled off "the perfect con", as Bloom and Penelope embark on a new life together.

== Cast ==
- Mark Ruffalo as Stephen Bloom: When Johnson first sat down with Ruffalo it was for the part of Bloom, but his actual personality was so similar to Stephen, Johnson chose to switch.
  - Max Records as young Stephen
- Rachel Weisz as Penelope Stamp: Weisz was being offered mostly drama roles but was interested in doing a comedy. She was drawn to the script because it is well written but still unusual. After Weisz decided on it she told her agent, "this is the one, this is the one." While working on the film she developed a rapport with her costar Adrien Brody.
- Adrien Brody as Bloom Bloom: When Brody first got the script he was working on The Darjeeling Limited and "was impressed by its originality and subtlety." While working on the film Brody considered a "bromance" to have formed between himself and Ruffalo which led to more genuine rapport between them.
  - Zachary Gordon as young Bloom
- Rinko Kikuchi as Bang Bang: Johnson did not write the part for Kikuchi but was nervous when casting her; he was not sure she would want another mute part after being mute in her last American film, Babel.
- Maximilian Schell as Diamond Dog. This is the actor's final English language film role.
- Robbie Coltrane as Maximillen "The Curator" Melvile
- Ricky Jay as the narrator
- Andy Nyman as Charleston
- Nora Zehetner as Rose
- Noah Segan as The Duke
- Stefan Kapičić as German bar owner
- Joseph Gordon-Levitt and Lukas Haas (uncredited cameo) as Bar patrons

== Production ==
The original script was titled Penelope after Rachel Weisz's character. Shooting began in Ulcinj, Montenegro, on March 19, 2007.

=== Script and development ===
"Paper Moon is probably the closest to a direct influence. I love The Sting and House of Games, but Paper Moon was really the first thing I watched that took more of a fairy-tale approach and was more relationship based. Other than that, God, take your pick."

—Rian Johnson, director/writer

Rian Johnson first had the idea for The Brothers Bloom a few years before Brick. Originally the film was going to be more serious and had a mentor relationship instead of brothers. He started writing the script after taking Brick to the Sundance Film Festival over the next six months. The script was challenging for Johnson to write because he wanted to create a character-based con man film with an "emotional payoff", while including all the storytelling aspects of the genre. Johnson felt by sticking to a standard form of a con man film (two guys with one girl and one of them falls in love with the girl), he could deviate from the classical ending with a big plot twist. When writing the script, Johnson watched The Man Who Would Be King, but his main influence came from Paper Moon. While filming the movie, he watched The Conformist and 8½ for visual style.

=== Filming locations ===
Penelope's castle is the Peleș Castle in Sinaia, Romania. Other locations include Belgrade (Serbia), the Constanța Casino, the Port of Constanța (Romania) and various locations in Greece and Montenegro. The exterior scenes involving the theft of the book were shot in Prague, both in and around Prague Castle and on the Charles Bridge. The ship board scenes were filmed on the steamship (yacht) SS Delphine.

=== Penelope's skills ===
During the two-week rehearsal period, Weisz had to learn to look like she could do all the skills that her character Penelope knew. This included banjo, violin, guitar, piano, juggling, break dancing, skateboarding, giraffe unicycle, and card tricks, among others. Brody helped Weisz learn to skateboard; she said, "Brody is a good skateboarder, so we were in the parking lot outside the place we were filming." Adrien Brody also helped her to learn to rap; when she first tried "he was so ashamed." The card trick was the most difficult for Weisz and took her a month of practicing every day to learn. The shot itself took 11 or so takes, but the one continuous shot in the film is not enhanced in any way.

== Soundtrack ==
The Brothers Bloom: Original Motion Picture Soundtrack

Soundtrack album by Nathan Johnson
- Released: May 19, 2009
- Length: 48:12
- Label: Cut Narrative Records

The Brothers Bloom: Original Motion Picture Soundtrack was released on May 19, 2009, by Cut Narrative Records. Director Rian Johnson's cousin, musician Nathan Johnson, composed the score for the film as he did on Johnson's directorial debut, Brick.

Three songs in the film are not available on the soundtrack: "Tonight I'll Be Staying Here with You" by Bob Dylan, "Miles from Nowhere" by Cat Stevens, and "Sleeping" by The Band, which was performed karaoke-style by Rinko Kikuchi. Rian Johnson listened to The Band while writing the script, and their music was a major influence on the score.

In a digitally-released soundtrack companion booklet, Nathan Johnson said that since the film was about storytelling, it made sense to use lyric-based songs as an inspiration. He also credited Italian composer Nino Rota as an influence.

== Release ==
The Brothers Bloom had its world premiere at the Toronto International Film Festival on September 9, 2008. The film was then screened as the opening night feature at the Boston Independent Film Festival on April 22, 2009. At the Newport Beach Film Fest Johnson won a festival honors award in the category of Outstanding Achievement in Directing. The first seven minutes of the film were posted to the online streaming video site, Hulu, on April 23, 2009.

=== Box office ===
The Brothers Bloom was originally to be released in the fall of 2009 but Summit pushed it forward to May. The film opened in four theaters in the U.S. in its first week, earning $90,400. During the Memorial Day weekend from May 23–25, 2009, the first weekend after its initial limited release, The Brothers Bloom grossed $495,527, from 52 theaters, ranking it #15. During its wide release weekend starting May 29, 2009, in 148 theaters the film grossed $627,971, ranking it #11.

The film finished its theatrical run after 12 weeks reaching at most 209 theaters during its sixth week. The film has grossed $3,531,756 domestically and $1,997,708 abroad for a total of $5,529,464. This placed it at number 167 for all films released in 2009. The film was released in the UK on 4 June 2010.

=== Critical reception ===
As of December 2020, review aggregate website Rotten Tomatoes reports a 68% approval rating, based on 156 reviews with an average rating of 6.20/10. The site's consensus stated that "Despite strong performances The Brothers Bloom ultimately does not fulfill its lofty ambitions." On Metacritic, the film was assigned a weighted average score of 55 out of 100 based on 26 reviews from mainstream critics, indicating "mixed or average reviews".

Claudia Puig writing for USA Today stated that the film "has it all" with an "offbeat perspective" and "magical realism style that works exquisitely". She gave The Brothers Bloom a 3.5 out of 4 and wrote that it "is an often rapturous trot around the globe" but noted that the film "loses some steam in the final half hour." Robert Wilonsky thought that Johnson had "infused The Brothers Bloom with so much heart and beauty that one can and should easily overlook its discomfiting moments." Wilonsky suggested a second viewing of the film is "even more profound and touching".

Roger Ebert commented how the film's "acting is a delight", but criticized it for being "too smug and pleased with itself". He continued by complaining that the film had "too many encores and curtain calls", ultimately giving it a score of two and a half stars out of four. Robert Abele's review of The Brothers Bloom for the Los Angeles Times criticized Brody for over-moping and considered Ruffalo as "out of sorts" but thought Weisz's performance as "the best thing in the movie". Abele also thought Johnson used too many filmmaking quirks and when Johnson was not distracting the audience he had his actors doing it.

=== Home media ===
The DVD and Blu-ray became available to rent on September 29, 2009 and to own on January 12, 2010.
