= The Day I Saw Your Heart =

- Film poster
- French: Et soudain tout le monde me manque
- Directed by: Jennifer Devoldère
- Written by: Jennifer Devoldère; Romain Lévy; Cécile Sellam
- Produced by: Aïssa Djabri; Farid Lahouassa
- Starring: Mélanie Laurent
- Cinematography: Laurent Tangy
- Edited by: Stéphane Pereira
- Music by: Nathan Johnson
- Production companies: Vertigo Productions; TF1 Droits Audiovisuels
- Distributed by: UGC
- Release date: 20 April 2011
- Country: France
- Language: French
- Budget: $6 million
- Box office: $2 million

The Day I Saw Your Heart (French: Et soudain, tout le monde me manque; lit. 'And suddenly I miss everyone') is a 2011 French comedy-drama film directed by Jennifer Devoldère and starring Mélanie Laurent, Michel Blanc, Florence Loiret Caille, Guillaume Gouix, Kev Adams, Camille Chamoux and Malik Bentalha.

== Plot ==
An unexpected pregnancy threatens to tear a family apart, but just might bring them closer together than ever before in this emotional family drama.

== Cast ==
- Mélanie Laurent as Justine Dhrey
- Michel Blanc as Eli Dhrey
- Florence Loiret Caille as Dom Dhrey
- Claude Perron as Suzanne Dhrey
- Guillaume Gouix as Sami
- Sébastien Castro as Bertrand
- Géraldine Nakache as Cécilia
- Manu Payet as Atom
- Karina Beuthe as Kirsten
