= Brick (film) =

2005 film directed by Rian Johnson

- Sundance release poster
- Directed by: Rian Johnson
- Written by: Rian Johnson
- Produced by: Ram Bergman; Mark G. Mathis
- Starring: Joseph Gordon-Levitt; Nora Zehetner; Noah Fleiss; Matt O'Leary; Noah Segan; Meagan Good; Emilie de Ravin; Richard Roundtree; Lukas Haas
- Cinematography: Steve Yedlin
- Edited by: Rian Johnson
- Music by: Nathan Johnson
- Production company: Bergman Lustig Productions
- Distributed by: Focus Features
- Release dates: January 21, 2005 (Sundance); April 7, 2006 (United States)
- Running time: 110 minutes
- Country: United States
- Language: English
- Budget: $450,000
- Box office: $3.9 million

Brick is a 2005 American neo-noir mystery thriller film written, edited, and directed by Rian Johnson in his directorial debut, starring Joseph Gordon-Levitt. Brick was distributed by Focus Features, and opened in New York and Los Angeles on April 7, 2006. The film's narrative centers on a hardboiled detective story set in a California suburb. Most of the main characters are high school students. The film draws heavily in plot, characterization, and dialogue from hardboiled classics, especially those by Dashiell Hammett. The title refers to a block of heroin, compressed roughly to the size and shape of a brick.

The film won the Special Jury Prize for Originality of Vision at the 2005 Sundance Film Festival, and received positive reviews from critics. It has come to be regarded as a cult classic.

== Plot ==
High school student Brendan Frye discovers a note directing him to a pay phone, where he receives a call from his ex-girlfriend Emily Kostich, begging him for help. She mentions a "bad brick", "the Pin", and "Tug" before abruptly hanging up, apparently afraid of a passing black Ford Mustang, from which a distinctively-branded cigarette is thrown. Unable to locate Emily, Brendan enlists his friend Brain for help. An encounter with another ex-girlfriend, Kara, leads him to a party held by flirtatious upper-class girl Laura Dannon and her boyfriend, Brad Bramish. Laura points Brendan to Dode, Emily's drug-addicted new boyfriend, who arranges a meeting with Emily.

Emily dismisses the phone call as a mistake and tells Brendan to let her go. Brendan steals her notepad and finds a note that leads him to her dead body in a tunnel the following morning where he is beaten by an unidentified assailant. Brendan decides to investigate her murder, hiding the body deeper within the tunnel to avoid police involvement. With help from Brain, Brendan realizes that "the Pin" refers to a local kingpin. Brendan picks a fight with Brad, hoping to attract the Pin's attention. Later, a man wearing a beanie attacks Brendan.

Later Brendan sees the black Mustang in a parking lot and is attacked by the beanie-wearing thug as he demands to meet the Pin instead of fighting back. The man, revealed as Tug, the Pin's main enforcer, takes Brendan to the Pin's house. Laura reveals that she was at the Pin's house as well and drives Brendan back to school. She explains that Emily stole a "brick" of heroin after being rejected by the Pin's operation. Laura offers to help Brendan, but he distrusts her.

The next day, the Pin hires Brendan. Dode calls Brendan and says he saw Brendan hide Emily's body and believes Brendan killed Emily. Brendan meets the Pin, who suspects that Tug is planning to betray him. At the Pin's house, Tug tells Brendan that the Pin had bought ten bricks of heroin and eight were sold off wholesale, the ninth was stolen and returned contaminated, and the final brick remains to be sold. The Pin reveals that Tug was also romantically involved with Emily.

Brendan intercepts Dode on the way to the meeting and discovers Emily was pregnant when she died; Dode believes the baby was his. Brendan arrives at the meeting to find Dode demanding money to reveal who killed Emily. Tug goes berserk and shoots Dode in the head, then threatens the Pin, who walks away as Brendan faints. Brendan awakens in Tug's bedroom, and Tug tells him they are at war with the Pin.

Brendan arranges a meeting between the two and waits in Tug's bedroom. Laura comforts him as he grieves for Emily, and he recognizes her cigarette as the same brand that was dropped from the Mustang during the call with Emily. At the meeting, chaos erupts when it is discovered that the tenth brick is missing. Tug beats the Pin to death while Brendan flees, escaping just as police arrive. As he goes, he passes the open trunk of Tug's car, where he has placed Emily's body to ensure that police blame her murder on Tug.

The next day, Brendan meets Laura at the school. She reveals that Tug died after a shootout with the police. Brendan explains that he knows Laura set Emily up to take the fall for Laura's theft of the ninth brick, then manipulated Emily into meeting Tug, who panicked and killed her after she told him he was the father of her unborn child. Brendan has written a note to the school administration stating that the tenth brick is in Laura's locker. Laura vindictively tells Brendan that Emily did not want to keep the baby because she did not love the father, and that Emily was three months pregnant when she died, meaning the unborn child was his. The movie ends with Brendan and Brain on the football field watching Laura walk away.

== Cast ==
- Joseph Gordon-Levitt as Brendan Frye
- Nora Zehetner as Laura Dannon
- Lukas Haas as "The Pin"
- Noah Fleiss as "Tug"
- Matt O'Leary as "The Brain"
- Emilie de Ravin as Emily Kostich
- Noah Segan as Dode
- Richard Roundtree as Assistant Vice Principal Trueman
- Meagan Good as Kara
- Brian White as Brad Bramish

== Production ==
=== Development ===
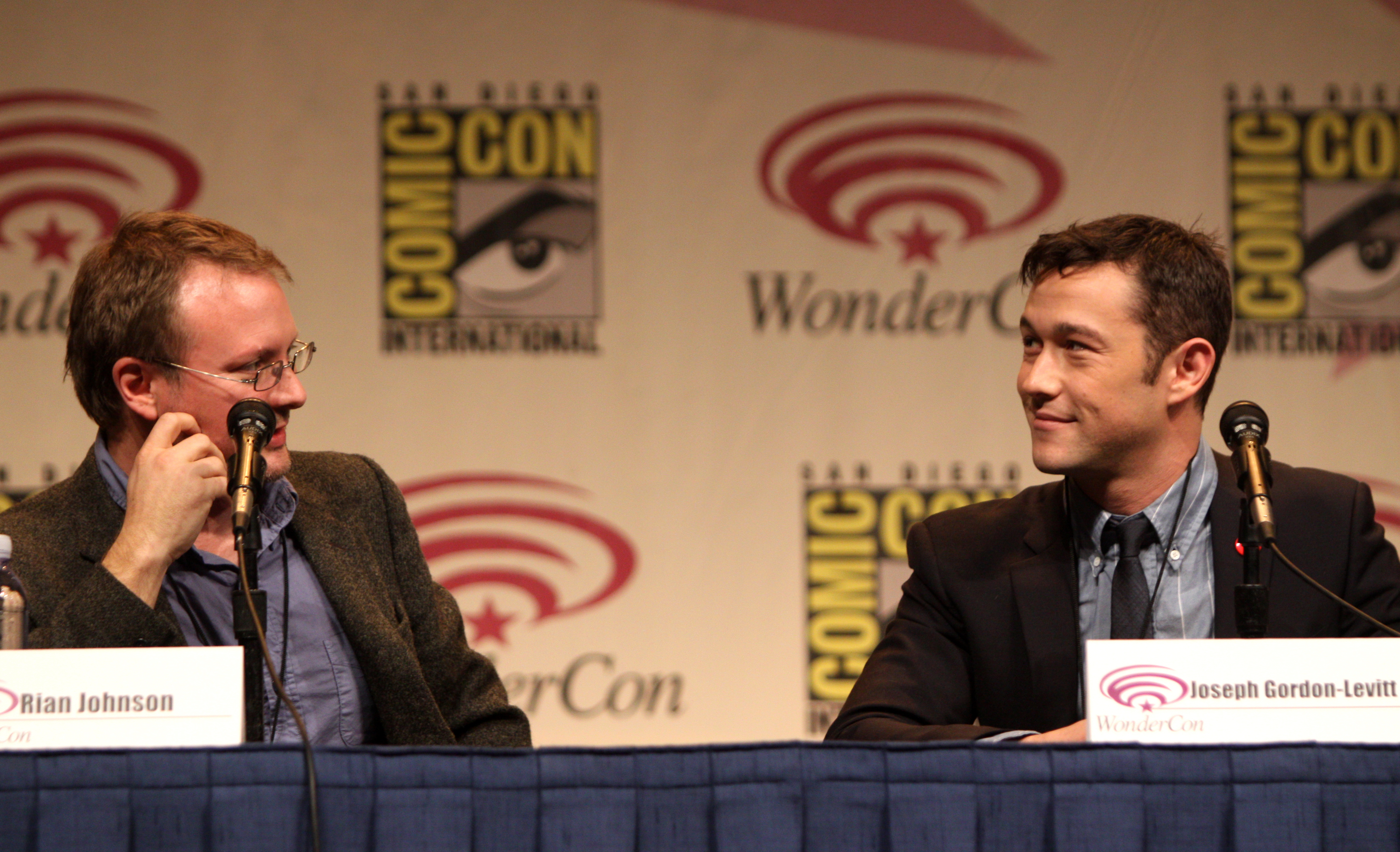
Rian Johnson with Joseph Gordon-Levitt in March 2012

The origins of Brick were Rian Johnson's obsessions with Dashiell Hammett's novels. Hammett was known for hardboiled detective novels and Johnson wanted to make a straightforward American detective story. He had discovered Hammett's work through an interview of the Coen brothers about their 1990 gangster film, Miller's Crossing. He read Red Harvest (1929) and then moved on to The Maltese Falcon (1930) and The Glass Key (1931), the latter of which had been the main influence for the Coens' film. Johnson had grown up watching detective films and film noir. Reading Hammett's novels inspired him to make his own contribution. He realized that this would result in a mere imitation and set his piece in high school to keep things fresh. Of the initial writing process he remarked "it was really amazing how all the archetypes from that detective world slid perfectly over the high school types". He also wanted to disrupt the visual traditions that came from the genre. Once he started making Brick, he found it "very much about the experience of being a teenager to me". Johnson maintained that the film was not autobiographical.

Johnson wrote the first draft in 1997 after graduating from USC School of Cinematic Arts a year earlier. He spent the next seven years pitching his script, but no one was interested, because the material was too unusual to make with a first-time director. Johnson estimated the minimal amount of money for which he could make the film, and asked friends and family for backing. His family were in the construction industry and contributed enough to encourage others to contribute. After Johnson had acquired about $450,000 for the film's budget, Brick began production in 2003.

=== Filming ===
Although the film was shot in 20 days, Johnson spent a great deal of time beforehand refining the script and three months rehearsing with the cast. He had seen Joseph Gordon-Levitt in Manic (2001), met with him, and knew that he wanted to cast the young actor. He encouraged the cast to read Hammett but not to watch any noir films, because he did not want them influencing their performances. Instead, he had them watch Billy Wilder comedies like The Apartment (1960) and His Girl Friday (1940). He was initially nervous working with a professional cast and crew for the first time but as soon as he started filming, this feeling went away and he had a good experience.

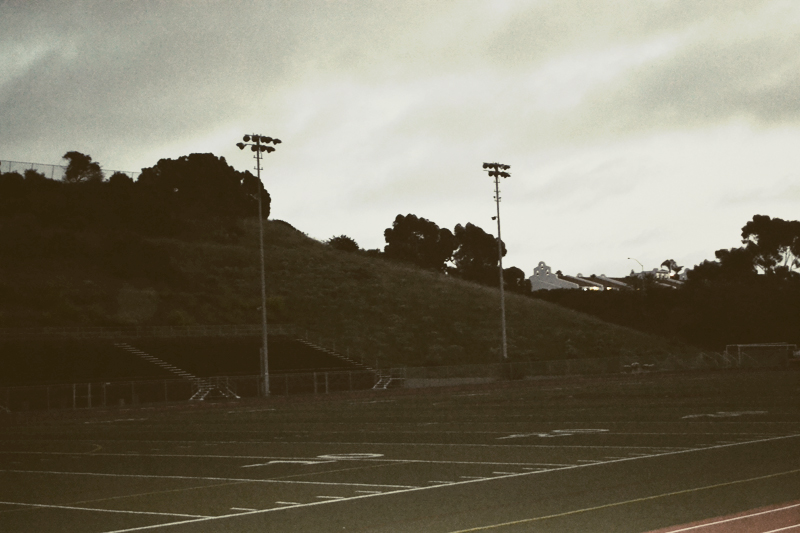
San Clemente High School Football Field

Johnson shot the film in his hometown of San Clemente, California, on 35 mm film stock. Much of the film takes place at San Clemente High School, which he attended. He enlisted current students to work on the film, shooting on weekends. The cinematographer was Steve Yedlin, a film school friend who had been involved with the project since the script was written.

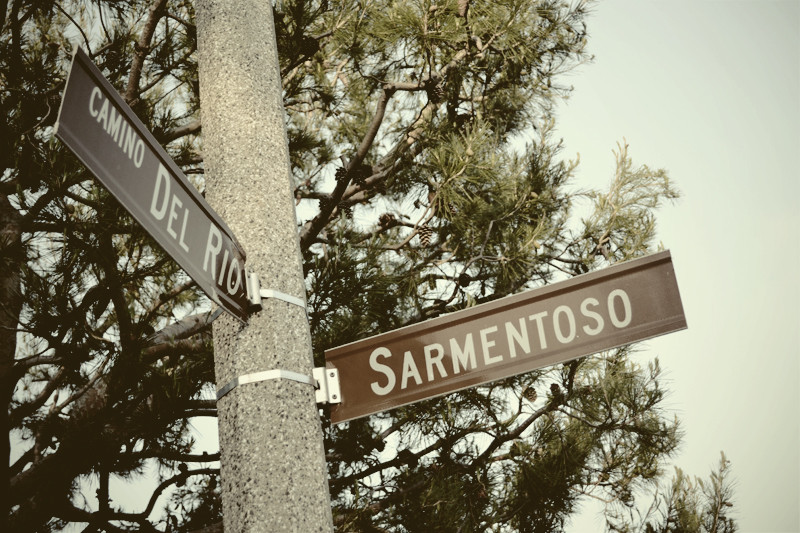
Street sign for Del Rio and Sarmentoso

For the telephone booth scenes, Johnson and crew filmed deep in the San Clemente suburbia. The same sign for the cross streets of Sarmentoso and Camino del Rio still stands. However, the phone booth itself was a prop.

Coffee and Pie Oh My! was a Carrows restaurant, but it has since been abandoned.

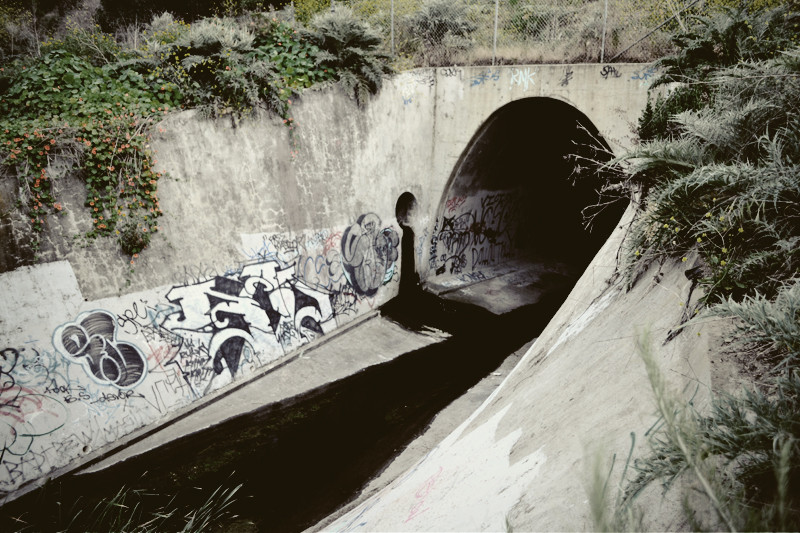
Drain tunnel under the Pico exit ramp

The drain tunnel from the film is located just down the street from the San Clemente High School football field and goes under the freeway by the Pico exit off-ramp.

Johnson had difficulty finding a run-down house for the Pin's base of operations. The production found an appropriate house, but only had a week until it was demolished to rebuild on its lot. The basement was a set that they built, but the Pin's kitchen and living room still exists at the Blarney Castle bed and breakfast. Johnson also had difficulty finding a mansion for the party scene until, with one day left to find the location, a former Telecom executive and eccentric millionaire allowed them to shoot in his place which was still under construction. The big mansion was packed from floor to ceiling with pay phones dating back to the 1950s.

Johnson cited Sergio Leone Spaghetti Westerns and Shinichiro Watanabe's Cowboy Bebop (1998) as influences on his visualization of the film. He used shoes as a design element for his characters and saw them as an "instant snapshot of the essence" of the characters. He has also stated that many of the film's visual cues were taken from the neo-noir Chinatown (1974) with its wide-open flat spaces.

=== Special effects ===
The majority of the film's special effects were cheaply and efficiently produced using practical and in-camera effects. Early in the film, for example, de Ravin walks toward the camera out of a tunnel as a garbage bag floats downstream and engulfs the camera, transitioning to Joseph Gordon-Levitt back in his character's bedroom. To achieve this, the desired effect was filmed in reverse order. The garbage bag began over the camera and was pulled away during filming, as de Ravin walked backwards into the tunnel. This footage was then cut into a scene in which a garbage bag was simply pulled over Gordon-Levitt's head.

Filming a car driving slowly in reverse, then playing the footage backwards at a higher speed gives the illusion of a car quickly approaching as the camera darts in front of it stylishly. Clever fades give the impression of time changes while smash cuts add tension to a scene in which the protagonist wakes up after passing out. Certain edits were also introduced to the film to time footage to different dialogue, adding certain information and leaving other information out. These edits are noticeable, as the actors' mouths are not always moving in sync with their dialogue. One particular scene, in which de Ravin's character floated toward the camera, used a green screen, but it was edited out of the film before its completion.

=== Editing ===
The original cut of the film ran over two hours, although it was edited down to 117 minutes for the Sundance Film Festival. An additional 7 minutes were cut before the theatrical release, including a shot of Zehetner's naked back as she put her shirt back on after she and Gordon-Levitt's character had sex. According to a post by Johnson on his own forums, he felt that the nudity felt wrong in the context of the film, and that he preferred to leave the degree of intimacy ambiguous, although he occasionally found himself second-guessing that decision.

=== Music ===
The score to Brick was composed by Johnson's cousin, Nathan Johnson, with additional support and music from The Cinematic Underground. The score harkens back to the style, feel and overall texture of noir films. It features traditional instruments such as the piano, trumpet and violin, and also contains unique and invented instruments such as the wine-o-phone, metallophone, tack pianos, filing cabinets, and kitchen utensils, all recorded with one microphone on an Apple PowerBook. Since Nathan Johnson was in England during most of the production process, the score was composed almost entirely over Apple iChat, with Rian playing clips of the movie for Nathan, who would then score them. The two met in New York City to mix the soundtrack. The soundtrack CD of the movie was released on March 12, 2006, by Lakeshore Records. In addition to Johnson's score, it contains songs by The Velvet Underground, Anton Karas and Kay Armen as well as the big band version of "Frankie and Johnny" performed by Bunny Berigan and a full unedited performance of "The sun whose rays are all ablaze" by Nora Zehetner. Johnson has confirmed that various elements in the film were influenced by Twin Peaks creator David Lynch.

== Home media ==
The Region 1 DVD release of Brick was released on August 8, 2006, as part of the Focus Features Spotlight Series. Special features include: selection of deleted and extended scenes with introductions by Johnson; audition footage featuring Nora Zehetner and Noah Segan; and feature audio commentary with Rian Johnson, Nora Zehetner, Noah Segan, producer Ram Bergman, production designer Jodie Tillen, and costume designer Michele Posch.

The Region 2 DVD was released on September 18, 2006.

The Blu-ray for Brick was released on January 7, 2020, by Kino Lorber, which was supervised by Johnson and Yedlin. It was previously scheduled to be released on May 7, 2019.

== Reception ==
=== Box office ===
Brick premiered in the United States on April 7, 2006, in two theaters. It opened to United Kingdom audiences on May 12, 2006, on a limited number of screens. According to the DVD commentary track, the film was made for $450,000. The film grossed US$2.07 million in North America and a total of $3.9 million worldwide.

=== Critical response ===
Brick has an approval rating of 80% on Rotten Tomatoes based on 143 reviews and an average score of 7.10/10. The consensus states: "This entertaining homage to noirs past has been slickly and compellingly updated to a contemporary high school setting." and ranked #35 on Entertainment Weekly's list of the "50 Best High School Movies". Based on 34 critic reviews, Metacritic gave it an average score of 72 out of 100, indicating "generally favorable" reviews.

Roger Ebert of the Chicago Sun-Times gave the film three out of four stars, stating "[It works] in the sense that the classic Hollywood noirs worked: The story is never clear while it unfolds, but it provides a rich source of dialogue, behavior and incidents." The film's only serious flaw, thought Ebert, was that the characters were not entirely believable and thus it was difficult to care about the outcome of events for the characters. Peter Travers of Rolling Stone also gave the film a positive review, explaining "A spoof would have been easy. Instead, Johnson plunges off the deep end, risking ridicule by shaping this spellbinder with grit and gravitas."

Stephen Holden of The New York Times commented, "Mr. Haas and Mr. Gordon-Levitt at least succeed in evoking the outlines of their characters. But the film's ham-handed reliance on period argot not only wears thin; it keeps the characters, such as they are, at a chilly distance."

Brick ranks 489th on Empire magazine's 2008 list of the 500 greatest movies of all time.

=== Accolades ===
Year	Award	Category	Recipient	Result
2005	Sundance Film Festival	Special Jury Prize: Dramatic, for Originality of Vision	Brick	Won
2005	Sundance Film Festival	Grand Jury Prize: Dramatic	Brick	Nominated
2005	Deauville Film Festival	Grand Special Prize	Brick	Won
2006	Chicago Film Critics Association Awards	Most Promising Director	Rian Johnson	Won
2006	Independent Spirit Awards	John Cassavetes Award	Brick	Nominated
2006	San Francisco Film Critics Circle Awards	Best Screenplay – Original	Rian Johnson	Nominated
2006	Satellite Awards	Best Original Score	Nathan Johnson	Nominated
2006	Sitges Film Festival	Citizen Kane Award for Best Directorial Revelation	Rian Johnson	Won
2007	Central Ohio Film Critics Association Awards	Best Overlooked Film	Brick	Won
2007	Central Ohio Film Critics Association Awards	Best Screenplay – Original	Rian Johnson	Won
2007	Online Film Critics Society Awards	Best Breakthrough Filmmaker	Rian Johnson	Nominated
2007	Empire Awards	Best Male Newcomer	Rian Johnson	Nominated

== See also ==
- List of cult films
