= Michaella =

Michaella is a feminine given name. Notable people with the name include:

- Michaella McCollum (fl. 2013–present), Northern Irish drug trafficker
- Michaella Rugwizangoga, Rwandan engineer
- Michaella Russell, South African actress

== See also ==
- Michaëlla Krajicek (born 1989), Dutch tennis player
- Michaela, feminine given name
