= List of accolades received by Glass Onion: A Knives Out Mystery =

Glass Onion: A Knives Out Mystery accolades
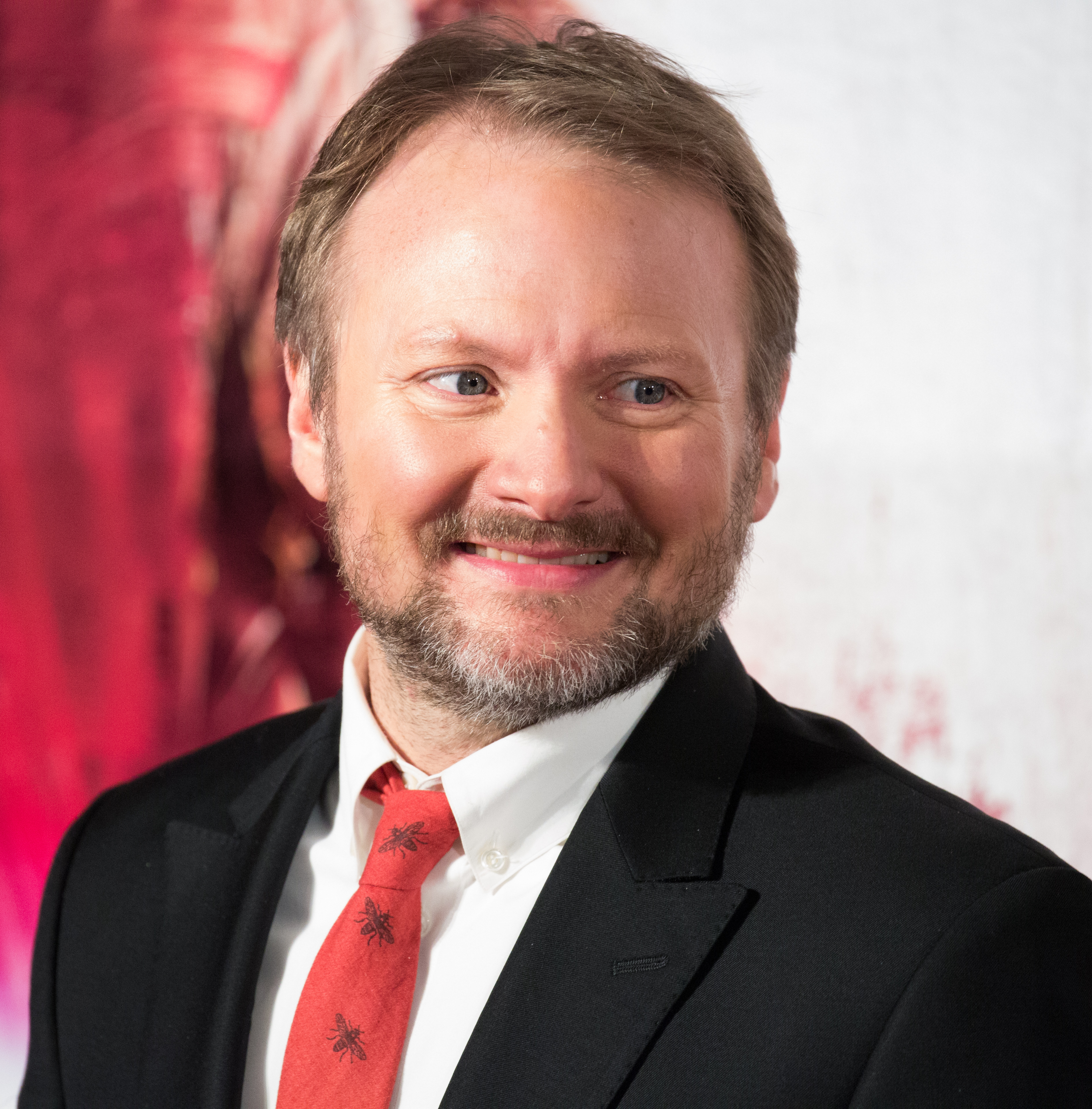
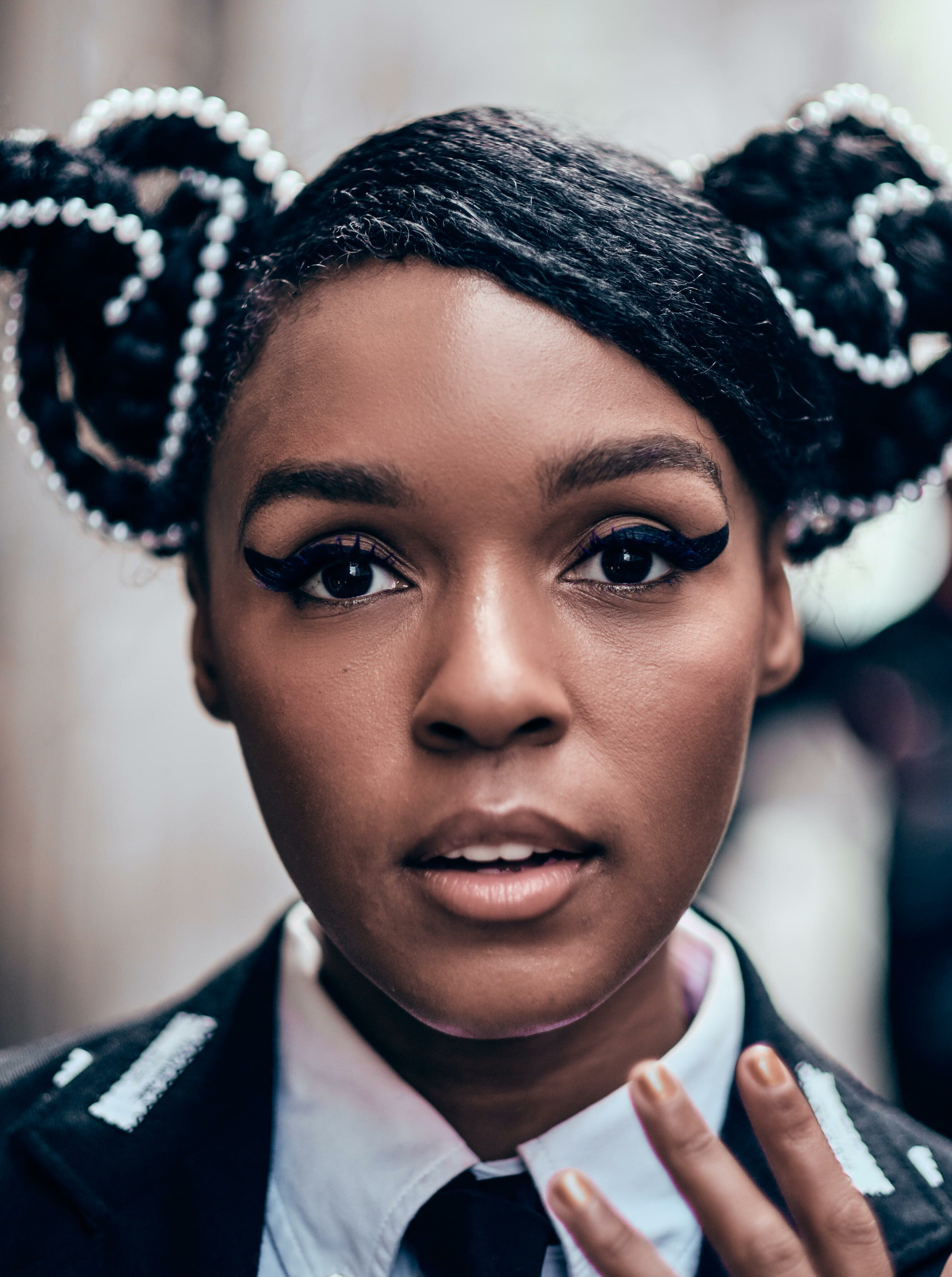
- Director Rian Johnson and actress Janelle Monáe received multiple awards and nominations for their respective work in the film.
Awards and nominations
Award	Wins	Nominations
AACTA International Awards	0	1
Academy Awards	0	1
African-American Film Critics Association Awards	3	3
Alliance of Women Film Journalists Awards	0	2
American Cinema Editors Awards	0	1
Art Directors Guild Awards	1	1
Artios Awards	0	1
ASCAP Awards	0	1
Austin Film Critics Association Awards	1	4
Black Reel Awards	0	1
Capri Hollywood International Film Festival Awards	2	2
Chicago Film Critics Association Awards	0	3
Costume Designers Guild Awards	1	1
Critics' Choice Movie Awards	2	6
Dallas-Fort Worth Film Critics Association Awards	1	1
Dorian Awards	0	2
Dublin Film Critics' Circle Awards	1	1
Florida Film Critics Circle Awards	0	1
Georgia Film Critics Association Awards	3	4
Golden Globe Awards	0	2
Golden Trailer Awards	3	7
Guild of Music Supervisors Awards	0	2
Hollywood Critics Association Awards	1	3
Hollywood Critics Association Creative Arts Awards	1	2
Houston Film Critics Society Awards	0	2
ICG Publicists Awards	0	1
International Film Music Critics Association Awards	1	1
Location Managers Guild Awards	0	1
Make-Up Artists and Hair Stylists Guild Awards	0	1
Miami International Film Festival	1	1
NAACP Image Awards	0	1
National Board of Review Awards	2	2
New York Film Critics Online Awards	1	1
Online Film Critics Society Awards	1	1
Producers Guild of America Awards	0	1
San Diego Film Critics Society Awards	1	4
San Francisco Bay Area Film Critics Circle Awards	0	2
Satellite Awards	1	5
Saturn Awards	0	1
Seattle Film Critics Society Awards	1	4
Set Decorators Society of America Awards	0	1
St. Louis Film Critics Association Awards	4	6
Toronto International Film Festival	1	1
Vancouver Film Critics Circle Awards	0	1
Washington D.C. Area Film Critics Association Awards	2	4
Writers Guild of America Awards	0	1

Totals (Note: Certain award groups do not simply award one winner. They acknowledge several different recipients, have runners-up, and have third place. Since this is a specific recognition and is different from losing an award, runner-up mentions are considered wins in this award tally. For simplification and to avoid errors, each award in this list has been presumed to have had a prior nomination.)
- Wins: 36
- Nominations: 96

Glass Onion: A Knives Out Mystery (titled onscreen as simply Glass Onion) is a 2022 American mystery film written and directed by Rian Johnson and produced by Johnson and Ram Bergman. It is a standalone sequel to the 2019 film Knives Out, with Daniel Craig reprising his role as master detective Benoit Blanc as he takes on a new case revolving around tech billionaire Miles Bron (played by Edward Norton) and his closest friends. The ensemble cast also includes Janelle Monáe, Kathryn Hahn, Leslie Odom Jr., Jessica Henwick, Madelyn Cline, Kate Hudson, and Dave Bautista.

Glass Onion: A Knives Out Mystery premiered at the Toronto International Film Festival on September 10, 2022, and began streaming on Netflix on December 23, after a one-week limited theatrical release on November 23. Produced on a budget of $40 million, Glass Onion grossed $15 million. On the review aggregator website Rotten Tomatoes, the film holds an approval rating of 92% based on 389 reviews.

Glass Onion: A Knives Out Mystery garnered awards and nominations in various categories with particular recognition for Johnson's direction, as well as its acting (mainly that of Monáe) and writing. It received a Best Adapted Screenplay nomination at the 95th Academy Awards. The film received five nominations at the 28th Critics' Choice Awards and won Best Comedy and Best Acting Ensemble. Glass Onion was nominated for Best Motion Picture – Musical or Comedy and Best Actor in a Motion Picture – Musical or Comedy (Craig) at the 80th Golden Globe Awards. In addition, the National Board of Review named Glass Onion one of the top-ten films of 2022.

== Accolades ==
Accolades received by Glass Onion: A Knives Out Mystery
Award	Date of ceremony	Category	Recipient(s)	Result	Ref.
AACTA International Awards	February 24, 2023	Best Screenplay	Rian Johnson	Nominated	
Academy Awards	March 12, 2023	Best Adapted Screenplay	Rian Johnson	Nominated	
African-American Film Critics Association Awards	March 1, 2023	Top 10 Films of the Year	Glass Onion: A Knives Out Mystery	5th place (Note: Tied with Emancipation (2022))	
African-American Film Critics Association Awards	March 1, 2023	Best Writing	Rian Johnson	Won	
African-American Film Critics Association Awards	March 1, 2023	Best Ensemble	Glass Onion: A Knives Out Mystery	Won	
Alliance of Women Film Journalists Awards	January 5, 2023	Best Actress in a Supporting Role	Janelle Monáe	Nominated	
Alliance of Women Film Journalists Awards	January 5, 2023	Best Screenplay, Adapted	Rian Johnson	Nominated	
American Cinema Editors Awards	March 5, 2023	Best Edited Feature Film – Comedy	Bob Ducsay	Nominated	
Art Directors Guild Awards	February 18, 2023	Excellence in Production Design for a Contemporary Film	Rick Heinrichs	Won	
Artios Awards	March 9, 2023	Big Budget – Comedy	Mary Vernieu and Bret Howe	Nominated	
ASCAP Awards	May 15, 2023	Film Score of the Year	Nathan Johnson	Nominated	
Austin Film Critics Association Awards	January 10, 2023	Best Supporting Actress	Janelle Monáe	Nominated	
Austin Film Critics Association Awards	January 10, 2023	Best Adapted Screenplay	Rian Johnson	Won	
Austin Film Critics Association Awards	January 10, 2023	Best Film Editing	Bob Ducsay	Nominated	
Austin Film Critics Association Awards	January 10, 2023	Best Ensemble	Glass Onion: A Knives Out Mystery	Nominated	
Black Reel Awards	February 6, 2023	Outstanding Supporting Actress	Janelle Monáe	Nominated	
Capri Hollywood International Film Festival Awards	January 4, 2023	Best Adapted Screenplay	Rian Johnson	Won	
Capri Hollywood International Film Festival Awards	January 4, 2023	Best Ensemble Cast	Glass Onion: A Knives Out Mystery	Won	
Chicago Film Critics Association Awards	December 14, 2022	Best Supporting Actress	Janelle Monáe	Nominated	
Chicago Film Critics Association Awards	December 14, 2022	Best Adapted Screenplay	Rian Johnson	Nominated	
Chicago Film Critics Association Awards	December 14, 2022	Best Art Direction/Production Design	Glass Onion: A Knives Out Mystery	Nominated	
Costume Designers Guild Awards	February 27, 2023	Excellence in Contemporary Film	Jenny Eagan	Won	
Critics' Choice Movie Awards	January 15, 2023	Best Picture	Glass Onion: A Knives Out Mystery	Nominated	
Critics' Choice Movie Awards	January 15, 2023	Best Comedy	Glass Onion: A Knives Out Mystery	Won	
Critics' Choice Movie Awards	January 15, 2023	Best Adapted Screenplay	Rian Johnson	Nominated	
Critics' Choice Movie Awards	January 15, 2023	Best Supporting Actress	Janelle Monáe	Nominated	
Critics' Choice Movie Awards	January 15, 2023	Best Costume Design	Jenny Eagan	Nominated	
Critics' Choice Movie Awards	January 15, 2023	Best Acting Ensemble	Glass Onion: A Knives Out Mystery	Won	
Dallas–Fort Worth Film Critics Association Awards	December 19, 2022	Best Supporting Actress	Janelle Monáe	5th place	
Dorian Awards	February 23, 2023	Supporting Film Performance of the Year	Janelle Monáe	Nominated	
Dorian Awards	February 23, 2023	Campiest Flick of the Year	Glass Onion: A Knives Out Mystery	Nominated	
Dublin Film Critics' Circle Awards	December 15, 2022	Best Screenplay	Rian Johnson	9th place	
Florida Film Critics Circle Awards	December 22, 2022	Best Adapted Screenplay	Rian Johnson	Nominated	
Georgia Film Critics Association	January 13, 2023	Best Picture	Glass Onion: A Knives Out Mystery	Nominated	
Georgia Film Critics Association	January 13, 2023	Best Supporting Actress	Janelle Monáe	Runner-up	
Georgia Film Critics Association	January 13, 2023	Best Adapted Screenplay	Rian Johnson	Won	
Georgia Film Critics Association	January 13, 2023	Best Ensemble	Glass Onion: A Knives Out Mystery	Won	
Golden Globe Awards	January 10, 2023	Best Motion Picture – Musical or Comedy	Glass Onion: A Knives Out Mystery	Nominated	
Golden Globe Awards	January 10, 2023	Best Actor in a Motion Picture – Musical or Comedy	Daniel Craig	Nominated	
Golden Trailer Awards	June 29, 2023	Most Original Trailer	"Puzzle" (MOTIVE)	Nominated	
Golden Trailer Awards	June 29, 2023	The Don LaFontaine Award for Best Voice Over	"Puzzle" (MOTIVE)	Won	
Golden Trailer Awards	June 29, 2023	Best Sound Editing	"Puzzle" (MOTIVE)	Nominated	
Golden Trailer Awards	June 29, 2023	Best Original Score	"Puzzle" (MOTIVE)	Won	
Golden Trailer Awards	June 29, 2023	Best Motion/Title Graphics	"Puzzle" (MOTIVE)	Won	
Golden Trailer Awards	June 29, 2023	Best Comedy TV Spot (for a Feature Film)	"Raise Your Glass" (MOTIVE)	Nominated	
Golden Trailer Awards	June 29, 2023	Best Viral Campaign for a Feature Film	Glass Onion: A Knives Out Mystery (MOTIVE)	Nominated	
Guild of Music Supervisors Awards	March 5, 2023	Best Music Supervision for Films Budgeted Over $25 Million	Julie Glaze Houlihan	Nominated	
Guild of Music Supervisors Awards	March 5, 2023	Best Music Supervision in a Trailer – Film	Scenery Samundra and Gregory Sweeney for "Official Teaser Trailer"	Nominated	
Hollywood Critics Association Awards	February 24, 2023	Best Cast Ensemble	Glass Onion: A Knives Out Mystery	Nominated	
Hollywood Critics Association Awards	February 24, 2023	Best Adapted Screenplay	Rian Johnson	Nominated	
Hollywood Critics Association Awards	February 24, 2023	Best Comedy	Glass Onion: A Knives Out Mystery	Won	
Hollywood Critics Association Creative Arts Awards	February 24, 2023	Best Casting Director	Mary Vernieu and Bret Howe	Won	
Hollywood Critics Association Creative Arts Awards	February 24, 2023	Best Film Editing	Bob Ducsay	Nominated	
Houston Film Critics Society Awards	February 18, 2023	Best Supporting Actress	Janelle Monáe	Nominated	
Houston Film Critics Society Awards	February 18, 2023	Best Ensemble Cast	Glass Onion: A Knives Out Mystery	Nominated	
ICG Publicists Awards	March 10, 2023	Maxwell Weinberg Publicists Showmanship Motion Picture Award	Glass Onion: A Knives Out Mystery	Nominated	
International Film Music Critics Association Awards	February 23, 2023	Best Original Score for a Comedy Film	Nathan Johnson	Won	
Location Managers Guild Awards	August 26, 2023	Outstanding Locations in a Contemporary Film	Glass Onion: A Knives Out Mystery	Nominated	
Make-Up Artists and Hair Stylists Guild Awards	February 11, 2023	Best Contemporary Hair Styling in a Feature-Length Motion Picture	Jeremy Woodhead, Tracey Smith, and Leslie D. Bennett	Nominated	
Miami International Film Festival	November 3, 2022	Ensemble Award	Glass Onion: A Knives Out Mystery	Won	
NAACP Image Awards	February 25, 2023	Outstanding Supporting Actress in a Motion Picture	Janelle Monáe	Nominated	
National Board of Review Awards	December 8, 2022	Top Ten Films	Glass Onion: A Knives Out Mystery	Won (Note: This award does not have a single winner, but recognizes multiple films.)	
National Board of Review Awards	December 8, 2022	Best Supporting Actress	Janelle Monáe	Won	
New York Film Critics Online Awards	December 11, 2022	Best Ensemble Cast	Glass Onion: A Knives Out Mystery	Won	
Online Film Critics Society Awards	January 23, 2023	Best Adapted Screenplay	Rian Johnson	Won	
Producers Guild of America Awards	February 25, 2023	Outstanding Producer of Theatrical Motion Pictures	Ram Bergman and Rian Johnson	Nominated	
San Diego Film Critics Society Awards	January 6, 2023	Best Comedic Performance	Daniel Craig	Runner-up	
San Diego Film Critics Society Awards	January 6, 2023	Best Ensemble	Glass Onion: A Knives Out Mystery	Nominated	
San Diego Film Critics Society Awards	January 6, 2023	Best Production Design	Rick Heinrichs	Nominated	
San Diego Film Critics Society Awards	January 6, 2023	Special Award for Body of Work	Ethan Hawke (Note: Also for The Black Phone (2021), The Northman (2022), and Raymond & Ray (2022))	Nominated	
San Francisco Bay Area Film Critics Circle Awards	January 9, 2023	Best Adapted Screenplay	Rian Johnson	Nominated	
San Francisco Bay Area Film Critics Circle Awards	January 9, 2023	Best Production Design	Rick Heinrichs and Elli Griff	Nominated	
Satellite Awards	March 3, 2023	Best Motion Picture, Comedy or Musical	Glass Onion: A Knives Out Mystery	Nominated	
Satellite Awards	March 3, 2023	Best Actor in a Motion Picture, Comedy or Musical	Daniel Craig	Nominated	
Satellite Awards	March 3, 2023	Best Actress in a Motion Picture, Comedy or Musical	Janelle Monáe	Nominated	
Satellite Awards	March 3, 2023	Best Adapted Screenplay	Rian Johnson	Nominated	
Satellite Awards	March 3, 2023	Best Cast in a Motion Picture	Glass Onion: A Knives Out Mystery	Won	
Saturn Awards	February 4, 2024	Best Thriller Film	Glass Onion: A Knives Out Mystery	Nominated	
Seattle Film Critics Society Awards	January 17, 2023	Best Picture	Glass Onion: A Knives Out Mystery	Nominated	
Seattle Film Critics Society Awards	January 17, 2023	Best Actress in a Supporting Role	Janelle Monáe	Nominated	
Seattle Film Critics Society Awards	January 17, 2023	Best Screenplay	Rian Johnson	Nominated	
Seattle Film Critics Society Awards	January 17, 2023	Best Ensemble Cast	Bret Howe and Mary Vernieu	Won	
Set Decorators Society of America Awards	February 14, 2023	Best Achievement in Decor/Design of a Contemporary Feature Film	Elli Griff and Rick Heinrichs	Nominated	
St. Louis Film Critics Association Awards	December 18, 2022	Best Comedy Film	Glass Onion: A Knives Out Mystery	Runner-up	
St. Louis Film Critics Association Awards	December 18, 2022	Best Actor	Daniel Craig	Nominated	
St. Louis Film Critics Association Awards	December 18, 2022	Best Supporting Actress	Janelle Monáe	Runner-up	
St. Louis Film Critics Association Awards	December 18, 2022	Best Adapted Screenplay	Rian Johnson	Nominated	
St. Louis Film Critics Association Awards	December 18, 2022	Best Production Design	Rick Heinrichs	Runner-up	
St. Louis Film Critics Association Awards	December 18, 2022	Best Ensemble	Glass Onion: A Knives Out Mystery	Runner-up	
Toronto International Film Festival	September 18, 2022	People's Choice Award	Glass Onion: A Knives Out Mystery	2nd Runner-up	
Vancouver Film Critics Circle Awards	February 13, 2023	Best Supporting Actress	Janelle Monáe	Nominated	
Washington D.C. Area Film Critics Association Awards	December 12, 2022	Best Supporting Actress	Janelle Monáe	Nominated	
Washington D.C. Area Film Critics Association Awards	December 12, 2022	Best Adapted Screenplay	Rian Johnson	Won	
Washington D.C. Area Film Critics Association Awards	December 12, 2022	Best Production Design	Rick Heinrichs and Elli Griff	Nominated	
Washington D.C. Area Film Critics Association Awards	December 12, 2022	Best Acting Ensemble	Glass Onion: A Knives Out Mystery	Won	
Writers Guild of America Awards	March 5, 2023	Best Adapted Screenplay	Rian Johnson	Nominated	
