= Sam Anderson =

American actor (born 1947)

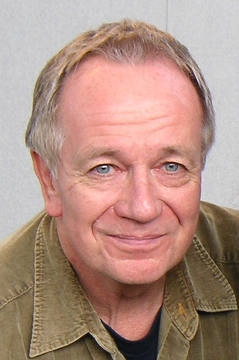
- Anderson in 2006
- Born: April 2, 1947 (age 79); Clark, South Dakota, U.S.
- Education: University of North Dakota, Antelope Valley College
- Occupation: Actor
- Years active: 1969–present
- Children: 2

Sam Anderson (born April 2, 1947) is an American actor. He is best known for his character roles such as Sam Gorpley on Perfect Strangers, Principal Willis DeWitt on Growing Pains, Holland Manners on Angel, dentist Bernard Nadler on Lost, Doctor Harad in Friends, Edwin Kingston in Matlock, and in film, as the principal in Forrest Gump.

== Early life ==
Anderson was born in Clark, South Dakota and grew up in Wahpeton, North Dakota. He received a Master of Arts degree in American literature and creative writing at the University of North Dakota and the University of Wisconsin. During the 1970s, he taught drama at Antelope Valley College in Lancaster, California.

== Career ==
Anderson is best known for his roles as mailroom supervisor Mr. Gorpley on Perfect Strangers, Mike Seaver's adversarial Principal DeWitt on Growing Pains, a chief of Cardiology on ER, the lawyer Holland Manners on the first two seasons of Angel and as Bernard on Lost. In addition, he was one of the recurring actors on various episodes of WKRP in Cincinnati, playing various roles, including an immigration officer in the episode "The Americanization of Ivan". In film, he notably played the school principal in Forrest Gump.

Anderson is also known as the assistant manager of the Hotel Royale in Star Trek: The Next Generation episode "The Royale", and as Doctor Harad in Friends. His other guest-starring roles include Remington Steele, Hill Street Blues, The Golden Girls, Murder, She Wrote, Picket Fences, The West Wing, Everybody Loves Raymond, and many other shows. Anderson guest-starred in Season 8 of NCIS as Walter Carmichael, a middle school teacher whose classroom becomes a crime scene where one of his students is kidnapped.

Anderson's most recent (2024) role is being a part of the reboot of the Matlock series on CBS. He plays the husband (Edwin) of Kathy Bates character Matty Matlock.

== Filmography ==
=== Film ===
Year	Title	Role	Notes
1979	The Swap	Paul	
1982	Airplane II: The Sequel	Man in white	
1982	The Tragedy of King Lear	Duke of Albany	
1985	Movers & Shakers	Ray Berg	
1987	La Bamba	Mr. Ludwig	
1988	Critters 2: The Main Course	Mr. Morgan	
1990	Dark Angel	Warren	
1992	Memoirs of an Invisible Man	Chairman of the House Committee	
1994	Forrest Gump	Principal	
1994	The Puppet Masters	Culbertson	
1997	After the Game	Jimmy Walsh	
1998	Permanent Midnight	Dr. Olsen	
1999	Sonic Impact	Alex Holmes	
2000	The Independent	Ed	
2000	The Distance	John Harrison	
2002	Slackers	Charles Patton	
2003	The Commission	Dr. Robert Roeder Shaw	
2004	50 Ways to Leave Your Lover	George	
2005	Touched	Dr. Reynolds	
2006	Dirty Habit	Bishop	
2011	Water for Elephants	Mr. Hyde	
2012	3, 2, 1... Frankie Go Boom	Dad (Chris)	
2012	Breaking the Girls	Professor Nolan	
2014	Devil's Due	Father Thomas	
2016	Do You Take This Man	Steven	
2016	Ouija: Origin of Evil	Mr. Browning	
2017	Maybe Someday	Douglas Donnelly	
2018	Song of Back and Neck	Jarred Foxen	
2021	Echoes of Violence	Conroy	
2022	Where the Crawdads Sing	mid-70s Tate Walker	

=== Television ===
Year	Title	Role	Notes
1978	Police Story	Jaques	Episode: "The Broken Badge"
1979–1981	WKRP in Cincinnati	Various roles	4 episodes
1980	The Stockard Channing Show	Arnold	Episode: "Catch a Falling Star"
1983	St. Elsewhere	Mr. McGrath	Episode: "Dog Day Hospital"
1983	Gloria	Mr. Copley	Episode: "An Uncredited Woman"
1983	Murder 1, Dancer 0	Paul Iberville	TV movie
1983	Remington Steele	Store manager	Episode: "Altared Steele"
1983	Policewoman Centerfold	Druggist	TV movie
1984	Blue Thunder	Benjamin Kelty	Episode: "Arms Race"
1984	T. J. Hooker	Leo Santee	Episode: "Death Strip"
1984	Mama Malone	Stanley, the announcer	11 episodes
1984	E/R	Mr. Dobbs	Episode: "All's Well That Ends"
1984	Hill Street Blues	Kenny Sterling	Episode: "Last Chance Salon"
1985	Hotel	Lon Schaeffer	Episode: "Fallen Idols"
1985	Magnum, P.I.	Ray Jones / John Doe	Episode: "Ms. Jones"
1985	Dallas	Inspector Frank Howard	2 episodes
1985	Tales from the Darkside	Dr. Synapsis	Episode: "Bigalow's Last Smoke"
1985	Hunter	Vinny Cochran	Episode: "Case X"
1985	Newhart	Larry's supporter	Episode: "Candidate Larry"
1985	Simon & Simon	Ellis	Episode: "Down-Home Country Blues"
1985	Eye to Eye	Walter Briggs	Episode #1.6
1986	Hardcastle and McCormick	Teddy Peters	Episode: "McCormick's Bar and Grill"
1986	Valerie	Customer	Episode: "This Son for Hire"
1986	Rowdies	George Modell	TV movie
1986	You Again?	Judge	Episode: "Life, Liberty and the Pursuit of Traffic Lights"
1986	The Golden Girls	Meyer	Episode: "'Twas the Nightmare Before Christmas"
1986–1992	Growing Pains	Principal Willis Dewitt	13 episodes
1986–1992	Perfect Strangers	Mr. Sam Gorpley / Harrison Harper	37 episodes
1987	Cagney & Lacey	Mike	Episode: "Easy Does It"
1987	What's Happening Now!!	Ingraham	Episode: "Raj on the Double"
1987	The Charmings	Dr. Peters	Episode: "Pilot"
1987	Buck James	Elias Turner	Episode: "Sins of the Father"
1988	21 Jump Street	Dan Finger	Episode: "School's Out"
1989	Star Trek: The Next Generation	Assistant manager	Episode: "The Royale"
1989	Hooperman	Dr. Lazlo	Episode: "Dog Day Afternoon, Morning and Night"
1989	Alien Nation	Thomas Edison	Episode: "The Game"
1990 & 1991	Uncle Buck	Kroger	2 episodes
1991	Married People	Beiderman	Episode: "You Were Right and I Was..."
1991–1993	L.A. Law	D.D.A. Bill Graphia	4 episodes
1992	The New WKRP in Cincinnati	Floyd Castro	Episode: "Mama Was a Rolling Stone"
1992	Jake and the Fatman	Arnie Crane	Episode: "Nightmare"
1992–1995	Picket Fences	FBI Agent Donald Morrell	7 episodes
1993	A Place to Be Loved	Judge Thomas S. Kirk	Television film
1993	Danger Theatre	Andre the Gourmet	Episode: "An Old Friend for Dinner"
1993	Melrose Place	Agent Hill	2 episodes
1993–1996	Murder, She Wrote	Various roles	4 episodes
1994	In the Heat of the Night	Drew Ward	Episode: "Maybelle Returns"
1994	Confessions: Two Faces of Evil	Father Dominic	TV movie
1994	The Adventures of Brisco County, Jr.	Simon Wolfe	Episode: "Brooklyn Dodgers"
1994	The Stand	Whitney Horgan	Miniseries
1994	Thunder Alley	Mr. Riley	Episode: "Speak No Evil"
1994 & 2000	Diagnosis: Murder	Dr. Hjortsberg / Ernie Pitt	3 episodes
1994–2007	ER	Dr. Jack Kayson	20 episodes
1995	Pointman	Phil Lettamar	Episode: "Trading Up in the Pale Moonlight"
1995	Live Shot	Marvin Seaborne	13 episodes
1996	The Man Next Door	Dwight Cooley	TV movie
1996	Nowhere Man	The Man	Episode: "Through a Lens Darkly"
1996	Norma Jean & Marilyn	Doctor	TV movie
1996	The Cape	Kevin Davis, Capcom	Episode: "Pilot"
1996	Aaahh!!! Real Monsters	Farrig / Kid #1	Episode: "Festival of the Festering Moon/Simon's Big Score"
1996	High Incident	Gulliksen	Episode: "Who'll Stop the Bombs?"
1996	Boston Common	President Butterfield / Wesley Butterfield	7 episodes
1996	Millennium	Agent Jack Pierson	Episode: "522666"
1997	The Jeff Foxworthy Show	Mr. Hertford	Episode: "Can't Teach an Old Dog New Tricks"
1997	The Sleepwalker Killing	Roth Lane	Television film
1997	The Visitor	Army General	Episode: "The Devil's Rainbow"
1997	Fame L.A.	Larry Peters	Episode: "Seize the Day"
1997	Rugrats	Salesman / Announcer	Episode: "Ransom of Cynthia/Turtle Recall"
1997	The Pretender	Dr. Curtis	Episode: "Over the Edge"
1998	The Pentagon Wars	Congressman #2	Television film
1998	Chicago Hope	Howard Sherwood	Episode: "Liver, Hold the Mushrooms"
1998	From the Earth to the Moon	Thomas O. Paine	2 episodes
1998	The X-Files	Leamus	Episode: "The Pine Bluff Variant"
1998	Prey	Dr. Ian Copeland	2 episodes
1998	Friends	Dr. Harad	Episode: "The One Hundredth"
1998	Fantasy Island	Mr. Gable	Episode: "Wishboned"
1999	Ally McBeal	Mark Harrison	Episode: "In Dreams"
1999	NetForce	Fox	TV movie
1999	Profiler	Ken Harker	Episode: "Seduction"
2000	Two Guys and a Girl	Dr. Harvey	Episode: "Love Shack"
2000	The West Wing	John LaSalle	Episode: "Shibboleth"
2000–2001	Angel	Holland Manners	8 episodes
2001	The Fighting Fitzgeralds	Judge Flanagan	Episode: "One Angry Man"
2001	JAG	Consulate General Raymond Dart	Episode: "Guilt"
2002	First Monday	Kristen Bremerton's Attorney	Episode: "Age of Consent"
2002	The Chronicle	Dr. Emmanuel Fickas	Episode: "I See Dead Fat People"
2002	Everybody Loves Raymond	Special Agent Thomas Garfield	Episode: "Lucky Suit"
2002	The Court	White House Counsel Reinhart	Episode: "Life Sentence"
2002	Family Law	Carlisle Tucker	Episode: "Admissions"
2002	Wolf Lake	Arthur Van Halen	Episode: "If These Wolves Could Talk"
2002	Pasadena	Dr. Paul Darwell	3 episodes
2002	CSI: Miami	Scott Sommer	Episode: "Golden Parachute"
2002	Presidio Med	Andy Sloan	Episode: "Pick Your Battles"
2003	Judging Amy	Gordon Kirby	Episode: "The Best Interests of the Child"
2003	Without a Trace	Congressman Whitehurst	Episode: "Kam Li"
2003	Boomtown	Scott Dawson	2 episodes
2003	Miracles	Cinda's Father	Episode: "Mother's Daughter"
2003	Secret Santa	Mr. Gibson	Television film
2003–2004	Married to the Kellys	Bill Kelly	21 episodes
2004	CSI: Crime Scene Investigation	Dr. Mercer	Episode: "Ch-Ch-Changes"
2005	Boston Legal	Walter Fife	Episode: "From Whence We Came"
2005	Malcolm in the Middle	Police Commissioner	Episode: "Billboard"
2005	Medium	Dr. Eliot Peterson	Episode: "Time Out of Mind"
2005–2010	Lost	Bernard Nadler	21 episodes
2006	Cold Case	Ted Robinson	Episode: "Joseph"
2006	CSI: NY	Dr. Richards	Episode: "And Here's to You, Mrs. Azrael"
2007	K-Ville	Mr. Dubois	Episode: "Pilot"
2009	Leverage	Henry Retzing	Episode: "The Snow Job"
2009	Grey's Anatomy	Michael Whitman	Episode: "Before and After"
2009	Criminal Minds	Dr. Rawlings	Episode: "House on Fire"
2010	The Forgotten	Train engineer	Episode: "Train Jane"
2010	Memphis Beat	Councilman Orland	Episode: "Don't Be So Cruel"
2010	NCIS	Walter Carmichael	Episode: "Worst Nightmare"
2012	Hawaii Five-0	Owen Sutherland	Episode: "Ka Ho' Oponopono"
2012	Work It	Dr. Keith Sorenson	Episode: "Shake Your Moneymaker"
2012	Harry's Law	Judge William Rothman	Episode: "Judge William Rothman"
2012	Men at Work	James Wilson	Episode: "Inventing Milo"
2012	NCIS: Los Angeles	Senator Dick Osborne	Episode: "Dead Body Politic"
2012	Scandal	Melvin Feen	Episode: "Spies Like Us"
2013	Dallas	Dr. David Gordon	2 episodes
2013–2014	Justified	Lee Paxton	9 episodes
2014	Castle	Principal Dunnan	Episode: "Smells Like Teen Spirit"
2014	Grimm	Rolek Porter / Old Man	2 episodes
2014	Chasing Life	Gerald Rayburn	2 episodes
2014	Bones	Hugo Sanderson	2 episodes
2016	Damien	Professor Igor Reneus	Episode: "The Beast Rises"
2017	Doubt	Judge Jonah Porter	Episode: "Then and Now"
2017	This Is Us	Judge Walter Crowder	Episode: "The Most Disappointed Man"
2018	American Woman	Raymond Turner	Episode: "Changes and the New Normal"
2019	How to Get Away with Murder	Thomas Fitzgerald	Episode: "I'm the Murderer"
2023	Painkiller	Raymond Sackler	6 episodes
2024–present	Matlock	Edwin	main cast (season 2) recurring cast (season 1)

== Awards and nominations ==
Ovation Awards

- 2019: Nominated for Lead Actor in a Play for the role of Ichabod Banks in the Road Theatre Company production of The Bird and Mr. Banks
