= Isabel May =

American actress (born 2000)

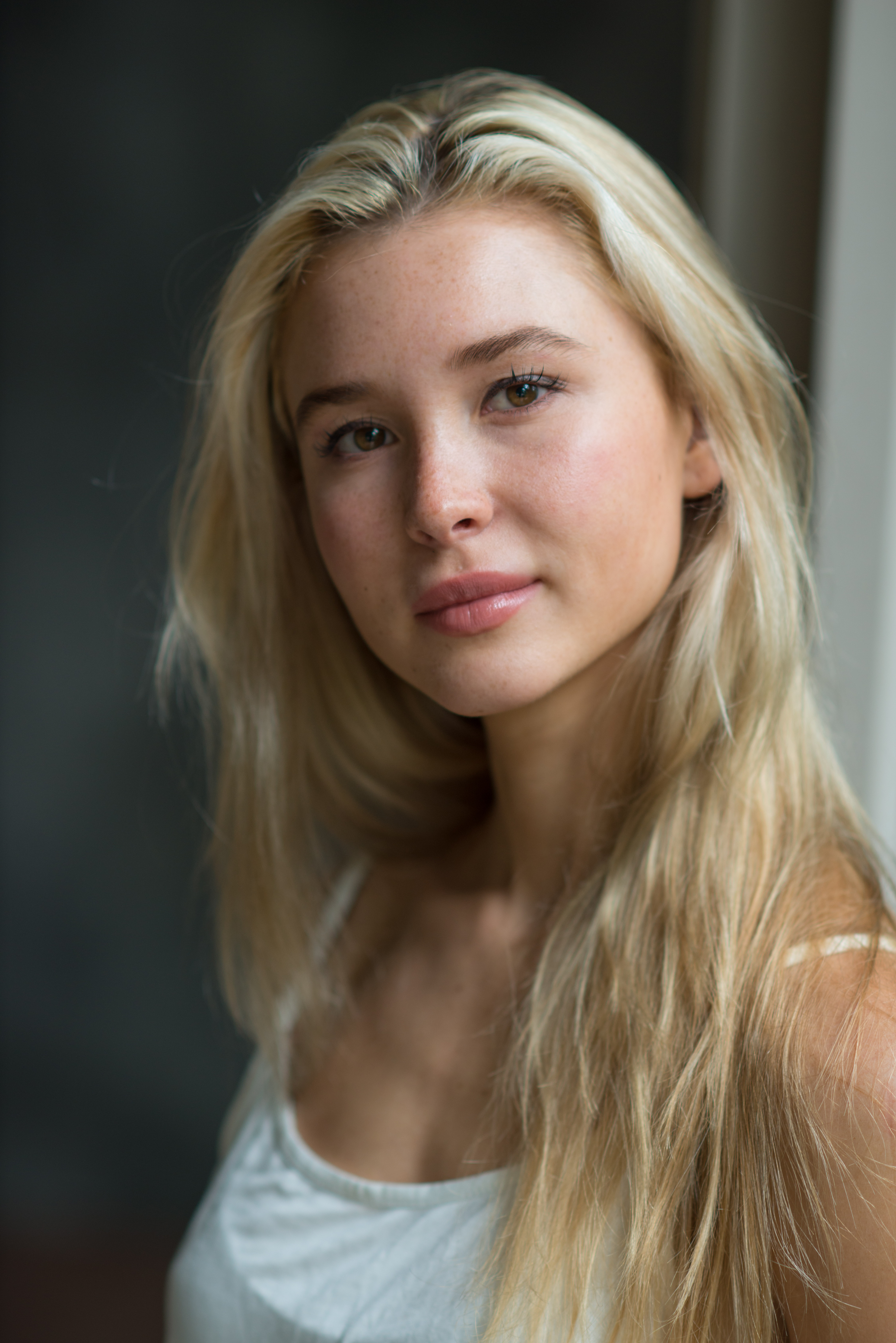
- May in 2023
- Born: November 21, 2000 (age 25); Santa Monica, California, U.S.
- Occupation: Actress
- Years active: 2018–present
- Known for: Katie Cooper in Alexa & Katie; Elsa Dutton in 1883, 1923, Yellowstone

Isabel May (born November 21, 2000) is an American actress. She first gained attention as high school student Katie Cooper on the Netflix series Alexa & Katie (2018–2020) as well as playing Elsa Dutton on the Paramount+ series 1883 (2021–2022). She reprised her role as Elsa Dutton as the narrator of its sequel series, 1923 (2022–2025). In 2026, she joined the Scream franchise starring as Tatum Evans, daughter of Sidney Prescott in Scream 7.

== Early life ==
May was born on November 21, 2000, in Santa Monica, California, and began auditioning for acting roles as a young teenager. After three years of auditioning without landing a role, May and her parents decided to have her schooling done online starting in tenth grade so she could concentrate on acting. Six months later, she booked her first role, being cast in Alexa & Katie as Katie Cooper, Alexa Mendoza's next-door neighbor and best friend.

== Career ==
May joined the cast of Young Sheldon as Veronica Duncan, the love interest of Sheldon's brother (Georgie). She appeared as the party host in the independent film Let's Scare Julie, a 90-minute one-shot film produced in 2018, about scaring a reclusive "girl next door" at a Halloween party. Run Hide Fight had its world premiere at the Venice Film Festival on September 10, 2020.

In 2021, May played Elsa Dutton, the lead character and the show's narrator in the Paramount+ Western limited series 1883, a prequel of Yellowstone. She was named as one of the most promising young stars in Hollywood by The Hollywood Reporter. She later returned to role as the narrator for 1923. For her role, May won the Outstanding Actress in a Made for Television Movie/Limited-Series at the 24th Women's Image Network Awards. In 2022, May appeared in a supporting role in the romantic comedy film I Want You Back.

In 2025, May was cast alongside Jennifer Lopez in the Robert Zemeckis-directed The Last Mrs. Parrish.

In 2026, she joined the Scream franchise as Tatum Evans, the daughter of Sidney Prescott in Scream 7.

== Filmography ==
=== Film ===
Year	Film	Role	Notes	Ref.
2018	Age of Summer	Missing Poster Girl		
2019	Let's Scare Julie	Taylor		
2020	Run Hide Fight	Zoe Hull		
2022	I Want You Back	Leighton		
2022	The Moon & Back	Lydia Gilbert		
2026	Scream 7	Tatum Evans		
2026	Love Language	Olivia		
2026	Falling	Jillian		
2026	Mr. Irrelevant †	Katie	Post-production	
2027	Karoshi †	TBA	Post-production	
TBA	The Last Mrs. Parrish †	Amber Patterson	Post-production	
TBA	Menace †	TBA	Post-production	
TBA	Love Love †	TBA	Filming	

=== Television ===
Year	Title	Role	Notes
2018–2020	Alexa & Katie	Katie Cooper	Main role; 39 episodes
2018–2020	Young Sheldon	Veronica Duncan	Recurring role (seasons 2–3); 9 episodes
2021–2022	1883	Elsa Dutton	Main role; 10 episodes
2022–2025	1923	Elsa Dutton	Narrator; 13 episodes
2024	Yellowstone	Elsa Dutton	Uncredited vocal role; 1 episode
2024	American Masters	Alta Hilsdale	Episode: "HOPPER: An American love story"; voice role
2024	Masters of the Air	Marjorie "Marge" Spencer	Episode: "Part One"

== Awards and nominations ==
Awards	Year	Category	Work	Result
Women's Image Network Awards	2022	Outstanding Actress in a Made For Television Movie / Limited Series	1883	Won
