= Deep Rising =

1998 American action horror film by Stephen Sommers

- Theatrical release poster
- Directed by: Stephen Sommers
- Written by: Stephen Sommers
- Produced by: Laurence Mark; John Baldecchi
- Starring: Treat Williams; Famke Janssen; Anthony Heald; Kevin J. O'Connor; Wes Studi; Derrick O'Connor; Jason Flemyng; Djimon Hounsou
- Cinematography: Howard Atherton
- Edited by: Bob Ducsay; John Wright
- Music by: Jerry Goldsmith
- Production companies: Hollywood Pictures; Cinergi Pictures
- Distributed by: Buena Vista Pictures Distribution (North and South America/France); Cinergi Productions (International, via Summit Entertainment)
- Release date: January 30, 1998
- Running time: 106 minutes
- Country: United States
- Language: English
- Budget: $45 million
- Box office: $11.2 million (USA)

Deep Rising is a 1998 American action horror film written and directed by Stephen Sommers and starring Treat Williams, Famke Janssen and Anthony Heald. It was distributed by Hollywood Pictures and Cinergi Pictures and released on January 30, 1998. While the film was a critical and box office failure, it has been regarded as a cult film.

== Plot ==
Captain John Finnegan and his crew, Joey and Leila, are hired by mercenaries Hanover, Mulligan, Mason, Billy, T-Ray, Mamooli, and Vivo to pilot their boat across the South China Sea to an undisclosed rendezvous point. Meanwhile, the Argonautica, (Note: Named after the Greek epic poem of the same name.) a luxury cruise ship built and owned by Simon Canton, is undertaking its maiden voyage. A thief, Trillian, is discovered and taken to the brig. An unidentified saboteur disables the ship's navigation and communication systems. Something rises from beneath and seizes the vessel, leaving it dead in the water. The crew and passengers are slaughtered by unseen creatures.

A speedboat that the Argonautica has shaken loose collides with Finnegan's boat. The mercenaries seize control with the intention of looting the passengers and vault of the Argonautica and then using the torpedoes stored on board to sink the ship. Leaving Leila and Billy behind to repair the boat, the mercenaries board and reach the grand atrium only to find blood and no sign of the passengers. Finnegan and Joey go to the ship's workshop to scavenge parts to repair the boat under Mamooli and T-Ray's guard. While repairing their boat, Leila is dragged away by the creatures. The creatures kill T-Ray as he investigates the unusual noises, before dragging Mamooli away as well. Finnegan and Joey flee and encounter an escaped Trillian.

The mercenaries reach the vault, and Vivo opens it. However, Canton, who was hiding inside with Captain Atherton and three other passengers, mistakenly kills Vivo. Mason and Mulligan panic and accidentally kill the passengers. The mercenaries, Canton, & the captain flee the creatures and subsequently encounter Finnegan, Joey, and Trillian.

Canton is revealed as the saboteur, having hired Hanover's mercenaries as pirates to loot and sink the unprofitable ship so that he could collect on the insurance, although Canton's original plan was to have the passengers escape in lifeboats but that was foiled by the appearance of the creatures. The creatures appear as Canton and Captain Atherton fight, releasing a partially digested Billy after Finnegan shoots it. After the creatures attack and eat Captain Atherton, Canton theorizes the creatures are an evolution of Ottoia, which drain their victims of their bodily fluids and then eject the bloody carcasses.

As the survivors flee, Mason is grabbed by a creature. He kills himself by detonating a grenade. Mulligan elects to stay behind in the crew's galley until a rescue party can arrive. A creature approaches Mulligan, who scares it off with fire from the stove before being devoured from behind by another creature.

In a running battle, the survivors find themselves being herded. Attempting to rid himself of any witnesses to his insurance scam, Canton misleads the others to the bow while he moves towards an exit route. The group finds the bow is a "feeding ground" full of bloody skeletal remains. The creatures break through the hull, flooding the lower decks and separating the survivors. Hanover wounds Joey to slow the creatures but is eventually devoured by one. As an act of mercy, Joey leaves Hanover a handgun. However, Hanover wastes his only bullet trying to kill Joey and is consumed.

Finnegan and Trillian spot an island and return to Finnegan's boat, but—having lost the engine parts—find it useless as a means of escape. Joey returns and begins repairs, and Finnegan sets the boat's autopilot to crash into the Argonautica and detonate the torpedoes to kill the monster. Trillian returns to the Argonautica and locates a jet ski with the fuel they can use to reach the island, but Canton arrives armed with a flare gun. Canton demands that Trillian either join him or hand over the keys to the jet ski, but she flees and he chases her. Finnegan pursues Canton to the grand atrium on the main deck, saving Trillian. The creatures smash through the main deck and are revealed to be tentacles of a massive deep-sea cephalopod-like monster—the Octalus—rather than individual entities. The Octalus grabs hold of Finnegan, who shoots it in the eye, blinding it and freeing himself, and he and Trillian escape on the jet ski. Canton flees the Argonautica by jumping onto Finnegan's boat, but breaks his leg doing so. Crippled, he cannot disable the autopilot and dies as the boat crashes into the Argonautica, detonating the torpedoes and destroying both ships and apparently the Octalus as well.

Finnegan and Trillian reach the island and reunite with Joey, who they thought had died. A roar then echoes from the jungle. The island turns out to have an active volcano in the distance as something big comes crashing through the trees towards the beach. Finnegan quips: "Now what?"

== Cast ==
- Treat Williams as John Finnegan
- Famke Janssen as Trillian St. James
- Anthony Heald as Simon Canton
- Kevin J. O'Connor as Joey Pantucci
- Wes Studi as Hanover
- Derrick O'Connor as Captain H.W. Atherton
- Jason Flemyng as Mulligan
- Cliff Curtis as Mamooli
- Clifton Powell as Mason
- Trevor Goddard as T-Ray
- Djimon Hounsou as Vivo
- Una Damon as Leila
- Clint Curtis as Billy

== Production ==
Stephen Sommers began writing the script to Deep Rising, then called Tentacle, when he worked at Hollywood Pictures in the mid-1990s. Sommers was inspired to write the script for the film after reading a National Geographic article about jellyfish. Claire Forlani was originally cast as Trillian St. James, but dropped out after just three days, due to creative differences with Sommers, and Famke Janssen was subsequently cast. Janssen almost did not get the part because the producers felt she was too recognizable from GoldenEye. Harrison Ford turned down the role of John Finnegan, which later went to Treat Williams, and the film's budget was later downsized.

Filming for Deep Rising began on June 12, 1996, and lasted until October 18 of that year. The film was originally set for release in the fall of 1997, but was delayed until the following January 1998. Industrial Light and Magic was responsible for the film's special effects while Rob Bottin who had previously worked on The Thing and on Paul Verhoven's RoboCop was hired as the special makeup effects designer.

The exterior shots of the cruise ship Argonautica were created by computer-generated imagery; it is an original design not based on any existing vessel. Two models of the cruise ship were created, a 38-foot (12 m) model for shots of the Argonautica on the ocean, and a 110-foot (34 m) model for the sinking of Argonautica.

== Reception ==
=== Box office ===
On its opening weekend, the film made $4,737,793 (42% of its total gross), ranking #8. It ended with a total intake of $11.2 million in North America.

=== Critical response ===
On the review aggregator website Rotten Tomatoes, 35% of 37 critics' reviews are positive. The website's consensus reads: "Its fleeting glimpses of creature feature mayhem are certainly dumb fun, but Deep Rising cribs from far too many better movies to stand on its own." Chicago Sun-Times critic Roger Ebert included the film in his most hated list. Ebert called the film "essentially an Alien clone with a fresh paint job". Variety's Leonard Klady said the film "is an old-fashioned B-movie with A-budget effects, but the quality sheen can't disguise the cheap-thrills hokum."

Ty Burr, writing for Entertainment Weekly called the film "a tightly written, often howlingly funny Aliens knockoff that, in its portrayal of tough men and tougher women under pressure, favorably recalls the work of Howard Hawks", giving it a grade of "B−". Bloody Disgusting wrote, "Excellent cast, State-of-art special effects, and terrific acting, this is a movie that should not be missed."

Audiences polled by CinemaScore gave the film an average grade of "C+" on an A+ to F scale.

Deep Rising has gone on to become a cult film. Later, director Stephen Sommers said: "It didn't do a ton of business, but it has a very fervent following."

== Home media ==
Deep Rising was released on DVD and VHS on October 19, 1998, both of which are now out of print. It was released as a 2-Disc Special Edition on DVD and Blu-ray on August 7, 2007. It was released on Blu-ray as a double feature with The Puppet Masters from Mill Creek Entertainment on October 9, 2012. Kino Lorber re-released the film on DVD and Blu-ray with new special features on August 21, 2018. The film is available on the U.S. streaming service of Peacock and the Japanese streaming service of Hulu Japan.
