= Stark Raving Mad (2002 film) =

2002 film directed by Drew Daywalt

- DVD cover
- Directed by: Drew Daywalt; David Schneider
- Written by: Drew Daywalt; David Schneider
- Produced by: John Baldecchi
- Starring: Seann William Scott; Lou Diamond Phillips
- Cinematography: Chuck Cohen
- Edited by: Hughes Winborne
- Music by: John Digweed; Nick Muir
- Production companies: Summit Entertainment; Newmarket Films; A Band Apart
- Distributed by: Columbia TriStar Home Entertainment
- Release date: January 13, 2002
- Running time: 101 minutes
- Country: United States
- Language: English
- Budget: $5 million
- Box office: $167,572

Stark Raving Mad is a 2002 American heist comedy film directed and written by Drew Daywalt and David Schneider and starring Seann William Scott and Lou Diamond Phillips. The film follows thief Ben McGewan (Scott), who organizes a rave at a nightclub in order to mask a bank heist. The film's soundtrack was composed by John Digweed.

== Plot ==
The plot follows a linear structure, encompassing the events of one night in a nightclub which has been hired for the night by protagonist Ben McGewan (Seann William Scott). The owner is unhappy with noise levels, fearing loss of his license, but noise levels is exactly what they want. The noise is specific cover for an illicit and complex bank heist orchestrated by the main character as a means of stealing a revered, ancient Chinese statuette and clearing his and his late brother's debt with a local Chinese crime lord. Ben must complete this Chinese task before dawn in order to spare his own life. As such, he hires three "experienced" bank robbers to perform the actual act, while he and his assistant ensure that the club night runs smoothly and without incident. However, such is not the case. Two FBI agents in the club (actually checking on a drugs deal) further thwart their plan, but a Chinese food delivery boy comes in on the plan and helps out giving cover stories for the loud bangs from the basement.

Ultimately, he clears out money from the bank vault and conspires that both the crime lord and his rival Chinese gang are both in the vault when the alarm goes off. The money belongs to the crime lord under a different name and he is found guilty of stealing his own money.

== Cast ==
- Seann William Scott as Ben McGewan
- Timm Sharp as Rikki Simms
- Patrick Breen as Jeffrey Jay
- John B. Crye as Jake Nealson (as John Crye)
- Suzy Nakamura as Betty Shin (as Suzi Nakamura)
- Lou Diamond Phillips as Gregory
- Dave Foley as Roy
- Kavan Smith as Michael Frakes
- Paul Hungerford as Scott
- Monet Mazur as Vanessa
- C. Ernst Harth as Dirk
- Jody Racicot as D.J.
- Terry Chen as Jin Sun
- Yee Jee Tso as Chan (Gang Member #1)
- Ty Olsson as Nate (Goon)
- Carl McDonald as Mitchell (Trannie)
- Reagan Dale Neis as Susan, Roy's under-age daughter known as Kitten
- Adam Arkin as the nightclub owner

== Reception ==
On the review aggregator website Rotten Tomatoes, 20% of 5 critics' reviews are positive.
