= Let's Scare Julie =

- Digital release poster
- Directed by: Jud Cremata
- Written by: Jud Cremata
- Produced by: Eryl Cochran; Jud Cremata; Marc Wolloff; Nick Sarkisov
- Starring: Troy Leigh-Anne Johnson; Isabel May; Odessa A'zion; Brooke Sorenson; Jessica Sarah Flaum
- Cinematography: Chuck Ozeas
- Music by: Katisse Buckingham
- Production company: Blitz Films
- Distributed by: Shout! Studios; Film Seekers
- Release date: October 2, 2020 (United States)
- Country: United States
- Language: English
- Budget: US$350K

Let's Scare Julie is a 2020 American experimental low budget horror film written and directed by Jud Cremata in his feature directorial debut. It stars Troy Leigh-Anne Johnson, Isabel May and Odessa A'zion. It was filmed in real time.

The plot follows a group of teen girls in real time who set out to scare Julie, their reclusive new neighbor, but the prank turns to terror when some of them don't come back.

On October 2, 2020, Shout! Studios released the film digitally in the United States to mixed reviews.

== Plot ==
Recently orphaned teen Emma and her 7-year-old sister, Lilly, are adjusting to living with their extended family. Late one night, Emma finds herself the victim of a wake-up prank perpetrated by her cousin Taylor and Taylor's three friends: Madison, Jess and Paige who have all snuck in unbeknownst to her paranoid Uncle Vince, a disturbed man who is purportedly patrolling the house drunk tonight. The air is charged with mischief and the conversation soon turns to the tragic lore around the darkened house across the street where a stray bullet had killed a boy. Ms. Dürer, his witchy mother rumored to be into the occult, died alone of a broken heart years later. The house remained empty until, recently, a single father and his never-seen teenage daughter Julie moved in. The girls surmise that Julie has gone to bed and is alone tonight and hatch a plan to wake-up prank her. Wanting to fit in, Emma reveals that she knows where her uncle keeps a key to Julie's house and agrees to go retrieve it.

The girls don scary light-up masks and head across the street, leaving Emma behind to tuck little Lilly in for the night. But a short time later, a frightened Paige returns from Julie's house alone. Before Emma can figure out what happened, she discovers that Lilly is missing from her room. Paige guesses that Lilly went with Taylor who abandoned the prank before they got to Julie's house, remembering that she had to pick her mom up from the airport. Madison turns up and argues with Paige over the seriousness of their prank on Julie, who appeared to have her face bandaged and went into a seizure when they scared her. When Madison calls Jess to find out why she hasn't returned, she's met with screams and the line goes dead. Not sure if Jess is pranking them, Madison decides to return to the house alone to find out what happened. Emma runs into a tortured Uncle Vince who tells a dark story of an accidental gun discharge that killed a boy across the street, presumably Ms. Dürer's son. Emma pleads with a crying Paige through a bathroom door to confess that this is all an elaborate hoax but when Paige goes silent, Emma enters the bathroom to discover that she's disappeared. Emma receives a distressed call from Lilly who, it turns out, snuck out to follow the girls to Julie's but is now locked in a dark room. Emma says she's coming to get her.

Terrified, Emma crosses the street and enters Julie's dark house. She enters a bedroom and discovers that Julie is dead, and a recent burn victim recovering at home. When she hears a car parking out front, she frantically calls out to Lilly, but Julie's dad enters, and Emma is forced to hide. She runs downstairs and finds Lilly locked in the basement. They flee back to their home but, as Emma is closing the door, she sees what must be Ms. Dürer standing outside the house.

Taylor finally calls back and Emma tells her that Julie was a burn victim who must have had a weak heart and died from fright over their prank. Emma frets about a girl she bullied named Shannon who ended up committing suicide and theorizes that the spectral Ms. Dürer seeks vengeance on teens who harm others, disappearing them to a dark place and now, wants to do the same to her. Emma is frightened to find Ms. Dürer standing at the top of the stairs. She runs up there to protect Lilly but Ms. Dürer is gone. Emma comforts a frightened Lilly and tells her to "be good to people no matter what". Resigned to her fate, Emma reenters the hallway where Ms. Dürer suddenly appears. Emma flees down the stairs, but they never seem to end, leaving the impression that Emma is being brought down into eternal darkness.

== Cast ==
- Troy Leigh-Anne Johnson as Emma
- Isabel May as Taylor
- Odessa A'zion as Madison (credited as Odessa Adlon)
- Brooke Sorenson as Jess
- Jessica Sarah Flaum as Paige
- Blake Robbins as Uncle Vince
- Dakota Baccelli as Lilly
- Valorie Hubbard as Ms. Dürer
- Bill Timoney as Julie's Dad

== Production ==
=== Concept and development ===
Writer and director Jud Cremata said he did not find splatter films frightening: "What I am frightened by is the unknown. It's not what's in the closet that's scary – it's the idea of what's in the closet." He concocted a slow wind-up story around this concept.

Inspired by Alfred Hitchcock's Rope and Josh Becker's Running Time which were edited to appear as a one-shot, Cremata envisioned filming an actual one-shot similar to Sebastian Schipper's Victoria as a tool for cinematic tension. "There is no looking away, and in some ways that mimics our reality," he said. Cremata's experience in docudrama and reality television production helped him prepare for this long take, fly on the wall, almost cinéma vérité approach to filmmaking and to the technical challenge of shooting an entire film in under 90 minutes.

=== Casting ===
In July 2018, Isabel May was announced to have joined the cast of the indie thriller. The plan was to shoot the film in one continuous uncut shot, using the script as a blueprint from which performers would improvise, giving the film a gritty, realistic feel.

Casting director Emily Schweber helped the director in the search for a teenaged ensemble cast as well as a 7-year-old actor, all comfortable with the feature-length improvisation the film would require.

=== Filming ===
With limited time for rehearsals, the cast and crew shot an entire film on each of four consecutive nights. "Every night I would go home and rewrite the parts that weren't working as well," Cremata said, "and every day we would come back and rehearse those revised scenes." The fourth night's film was chosen to be released as the final 82-minute film.

Troy Leigh-Anne Johnson played the lead role of Emma and loved the creative freedom that Cremata allowed. "Of course, there are specific points that we have to hit in order to continue moving the plot forward, but how we get to those points and what we say to get to those points was ultimately left up to us as actors," she said. "I think it leads to a lot of very realistic conversation and dialogue." That realism is what Cremata was aiming for. "I hope it feels like the camera just descended into a room of teenagers," he said.

"It's a great deal of trust that we all put in each other," Cremata said about his cast and crew. "It was like everyone's hands were on a Ouija board, and we were all spelling out Let's Scare Julie."

== Music ==
Katisse Buckingham composed and performed the opening score to the film which was done entirely by flute.

== Reception ==
=== Critical response ===
On the review aggregation website Rotten Tomatoes, the film scored positive reviews from 46% of critics.

Michael Gursky wrote for MovieWeb that "Cremata's directing doesn't just inspire great acting and an accurate view of late-night adolescent happenings, it elicits heart-pounding anxiety from the viewer." He went on to say that "Cremata deserves an immense amount of credit for crafting an original thriller. His Hitchcock Rope-inspired one-shot method is cause for real thrill, but said thrill never rises above nervousness."

Cody Hamman wrote for JoBlo that the film "is a fine way to spend 83 minutes" but that he noticed a few jump cuts. "It's unfortunate that the decision was made to make some cuts after the fact, because it takes away from the achievement a bit. Yes, the cast and crew did still manage to pull this off, that's awesome, but the cuts will cause some viewers to doubt that the movie really was completely shot in one take."

Shawn Macomber wrote for Rue Morgue Magazine that "Let's Scare Julie transforms... from a meditation on bullying, peer pressure and the damage teenage alienation and vulnerability – self-inflicted or otherwise – can leave in its wake to something that feels a bit more Insideous-esque. To writer/director Jud Cremata's credit, this switch-up feels more like a step deeper into the shadows than a tonal leap too far. It's as if the wages of pranks have come home to roost in a larger, more metaphorical way than is typically the case."

Rob Rector wrote for Film Threat that "Considering the number of things Let's Scare Julie gets right (acting, cinematography, score), it feels that if the story was given time to breathe instead of racing to beat the battery life on the cameras, it could have effectively put its audience in a Halloween state of mind."

=== Recognition ===
- Official Selection 2019 MidWest WeirdFest, Wisconsin (World Premiere)
- Official Selection 2020 FrightFest Film Festival, London (European Premiere)
- British Film Institute contributor and film critic Kim Newman ranked Let's Scare Julie the 3rd best film of 2020.
