= Jessica Sarah Flaum =

American actress, writer, and filmmaker

- Occupations: Actress, writer and documentary filmmaker
- Known for: PBC (web series)
- Notable work: Abortion: Add to Cart
- Website: www.jessicasarahflaum.com

Jessica Sarah Flaum is an American actress, writer and documentary filmmaker. She is known for her role in the 2018 HBO film The Tale and plays the lead in the workplace comedy web series PBC. She co-wrote the comedy horror film AMFAD All My Friends Are Dead and directed and produced the documentary Abortion: Add to Cart.

== Career ==
In 2018, she appeared in Emmy nominated film The Tale as the 15-year-old version of Jennifer Fox, who is also portrayed in the film at different ages by Laura Dern and Isabelle Nélisse. The story tells the story of Fox's child sexual abuse and her coming to terms with it in her later life. It premiered at the 2018 Sundance Film Festival and aired on HBO.

Flaum played the lead in the viral mockumentary web series PBC alongside Christian A. Pierce, Pete Gardner, Danny Trejo, Kate Flannery, Creed Bratton, and Brittany Furlan. A second-season premiered in December 2022, with new cast additions including Cheri Oteri and Neil Flynn.

In 2022, Flaum directed and produced the documentary Abortion: Add to Cart, which explores people in the United States undergoing self-managed abortion with pills bought online. The film won the award for Best Short Documentary at the Manchester Film Festival. She was subsequently interviewed for the publication Abortion Pills: US History and Politics, released in 2024.

Also in 2022, she was cast in the upcoming film Miles Away.

Flaum co-wrote and co-produced AMFAD All My Friends Are Dead, directed by Marcus Dunstan and starring Jade Pettyjohn and Jojo Siwa. The film premiered at the Tribeca Film Festival in 2024. She also co-produced the documentary Family Tree, directed by Jennifer MacArthur, in 2024. The documentary explores sustainable forestry in North Carolina through the stories of two black families.

== Filmography ==
=== Film ===
Year	Title	Role
2018	The Tale	Jenny Fox, Age 15
2020	Let's Scare Julie	Paige
2024	AMFAD All My Friends Are Dead	Writer, co-Producer

=== Television ===
Year	Title	Role	Notes
2019	What/If	Anne	Guest Star
2022	PBC	Sarah	Main cast, writer, co-Producer
