= Glass Onion: A Knives Out Mystery =

2022 film by Rian Johnson

- Release poster
- Directed by: Rian Johnson
- Written by: Rian Johnson
- Produced by: Ram Bergman; Rian Johnson
- Starring: Daniel Craig; Edward Norton; Janelle Monáe; Kathryn Hahn; Leslie Odom Jr.; Jessica Henwick; Madelyn Cline; Kate Hudson; Dave Bautista
- Cinematography: Steve Yedlin
- Edited by: Bob Ducsay
- Music by: Nathan Johnson
- Production company: T-Street
- Distributed by: Netflix
- Release dates: September 10, 2022 (TIFF); November 23, 2022 (United States); December 23, 2022 (Netflix)
- Running time: 139 minutes
- Country: United States
- Language: English
- Budget: $40 million
- Box office: $15 million

Glass Onion: A Knives Out Mystery is a 2022 American mystery film written and directed by Rian Johnson, and produced by Johnson and Ram Bergman. It is a standalone sequel to the 2019 film Knives Out, and the second installment in the Knives Out film series. Glass Onion sees Daniel Craig return as master detective Benoit Blanc as he takes on a new case revolving around tech billionaire Miles Bron (played by Edward Norton) and his closest friends. The ensemble cast also includes Janelle Monáe, Kathryn Hahn, Leslie Odom Jr., Jessica Henwick, Madelyn Cline, Kate Hudson, and Dave Bautista.

Johnson had considered several films featuring the Benoit Blanc character before the first film's release. A sequel was greenlit by its original distributor Lionsgate in 2020, but in March 2021 Netflix bought the rights to two Knives Out sequels for $469 million. The cast signed on that May. Filming took place on the Greek island of Spetses in June and July 2021, and continued in Belgrade until September.

Following its world premiere at the Toronto International Film Festival on September 10, 2022, Glass Onion began a one-week limited theatrical release on November 23, 2022, and grossed $15 million. Netflix began streaming it on December 23. Like its predecessor, Glass Onion received critical acclaim, with reviewers praising Johnson's screenplay and direction, the performances of the cast, and the musical score. The National Board of Review named Glass Onion as one of the top ten films of 2022. The film received a nomination for Best Adapted Screenplay at the 95th Academy Awards, and received numerous other accolades. A third Knives Out film, Wake Up Dead Man, was released in theaters on November 26, 2025.

== Plot ==
Leonardo da Vinci's early 16th century painting, Mona Lisa, is featured as a major plot point in the film.

During the COVID-19 pandemic in May 2020, Miles Bron, the co-founder of technology company Alpha, hosts a murder mystery game at the Glass Onion, his mansion on a private island in Greece. He sends invitations via intricate puzzle boxes to his friend group, the "Disruptors": Alpha head scientist Lionel Toussaint, Connecticut governor Claire Debella, controversial model-turned-fashion designer Birdie Jay, men's rights streamer Duke Cody, and ousted Alpha co-founder Cassandra "Andi" Brand, who is estranged from the rest.

The Disruptors travel to Miles's island, along with Birdie's assistant Peg and Duke's girlfriend Whiskey. Famous detective Benoit Blanc joins them, claiming Miles invited him; however, upon arrival Miles privately tells Blanc that another guest probably invited him as a joke, and lets him stay. Before dinner, Miles shows off his glass sculpture collection and the Mona Lisa, which he has on loan from the Louvre. Miles also reveals that the mansion is powered by "Klear", a hydrogen-based alternative fuel that Alpha will soon sell despite Lionel and Claire's knowledge that it is dangerously volatile.

Blanc solves Miles's murder mystery game immediately and privately warns Miles that the Disruptors all have motives to kill him. After an argument with the rest of the group, Andi storms off. Duke suddenly dies after drinking from Miles's glass and the panicked group suspects that Andi attempted to poison Miles. Lionel calls the police but they are unable to arrive until morning. After the group discovers Duke's pistol is missing, a power outage occurs, prompting the group to scatter. Blanc finds Andi, whom he addresses as Helen, but an unseen assailant shoots her. Blanc gathers the group away from the body and announces that he has solved Andi's murder.

An extended flashback shows that Andi had actually died a week earlier, apparently by suicide, and her twin sister Helen hired Blanc to investigate. Andi had halted Alpha's development of Klear because of safety concerns, so Miles fired her. Andi sued Miles, but lost after the other Disruptors perjured themselves by testifying that Miles and not Andi had single-handedly sketched out the original plan for Alpha on a napkin. Shortly before her death, Andi had emailed the group a photo showing that she had found the original napkin. Helen suspected that one of the Disruptors killed Andi and stole the napkin to protect Miles and themselves. With Andi's death not yet public knowledge, Blanc persuaded Helen to pose as Andi at Miles's party and help him investigate.

Helen helped Blanc discover the Disruptors' motives to protect Miles: Lionel and Claire have staked their reputations on Klear, Birdie needs Miles's financial assistance to handle the fallout of ignorantly employing sweatshops, and Duke was hoping for a show on Alpha News. Each of them visited Andi's home on the day she died. On the island, Helen searched the guests' rooms but did not find the napkin. When she was shot, Andi's journal in her jacket pocket stopped the bullet; with the other Disruptors believing her dead, she searched Miles's office.

Blanc announces that Miles committed both murders, having only dismissed the idea earlier because he overestimated Miles' intelligence. Miles drugged Andi and staged her “suicide” after learning she had the napkin, but Duke saw him leaving Andi's house. During the party, Duke saw a news report of Andi's death and, realizing that Miles was responsible, attempted to blackmail him. Miles then poisoned Duke with pineapple juice, which Duke was deathly allergic to, took Duke's pistol, and shot Helen.

Helen locates Andi's napkin in Miles's office and reveals her identity to the group. Miles burns the napkin, eliminating the evidence, and his friends refuse to testify against him. Blanc tells Helen that he has done all he can and goes outside. In a rage, Helen smashes Miles's glass sculptures, and the group briefly joins in. Helen lights a bonfire and throws a piece of Klear into the fire, causing an explosion that destroys the mansion and the Mona Lisa. With Klear now proven dangerous and Miles's reputation ruined by the destruction of the Mona Lisa, Miles has no leverage and the group decides to testify against him. On the beach, Helen and Blanc watch as police boats arrive.

== Cast ==
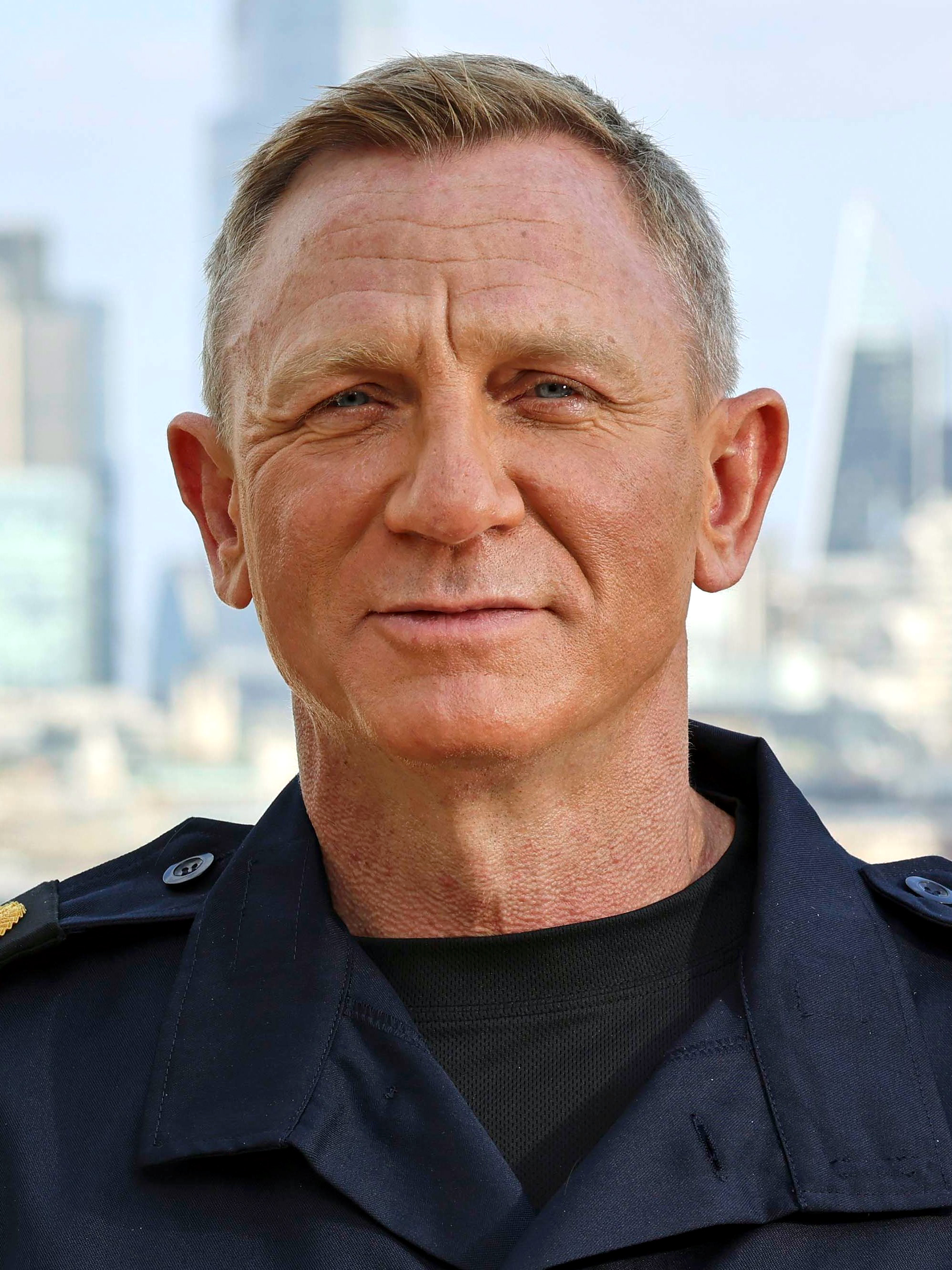
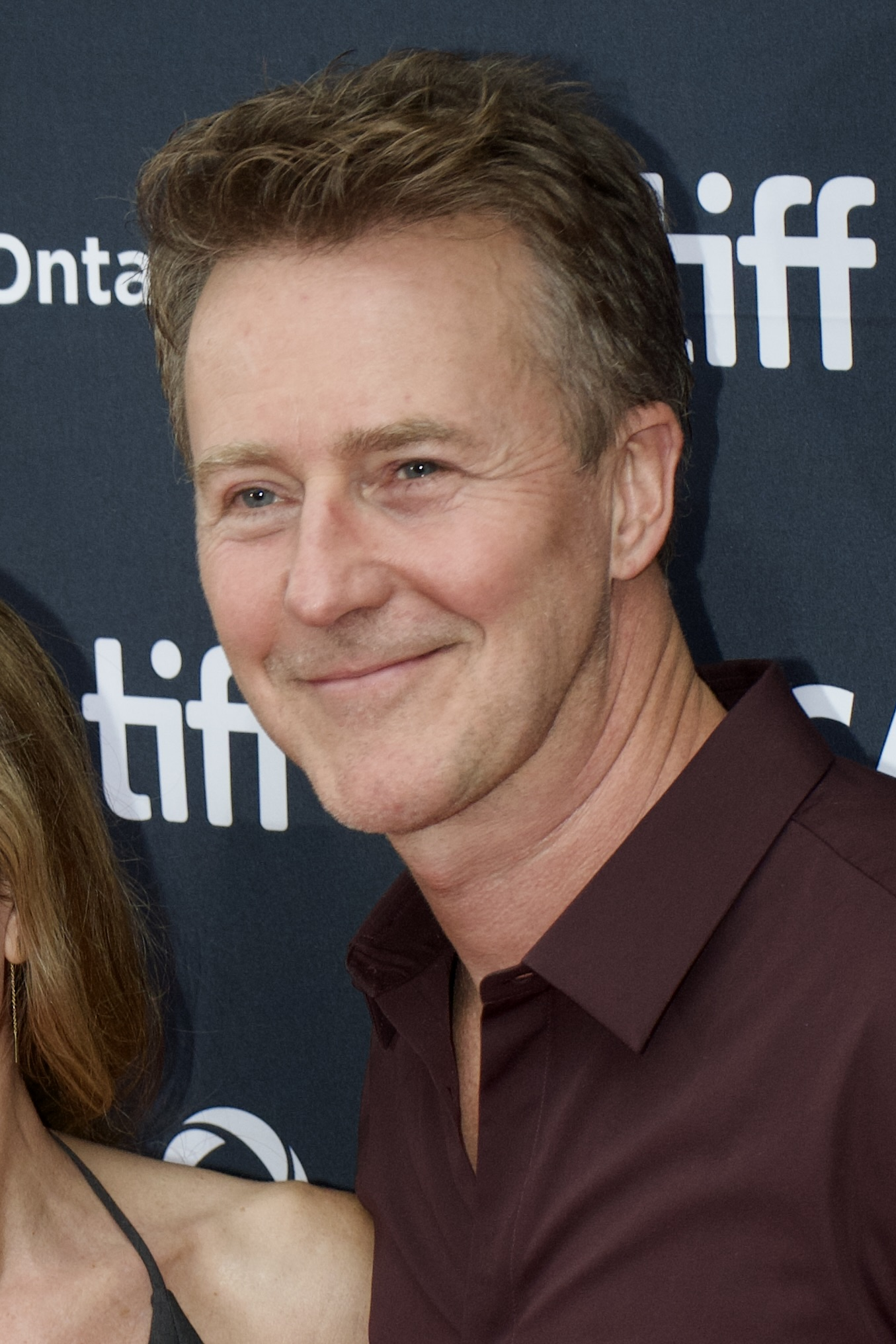
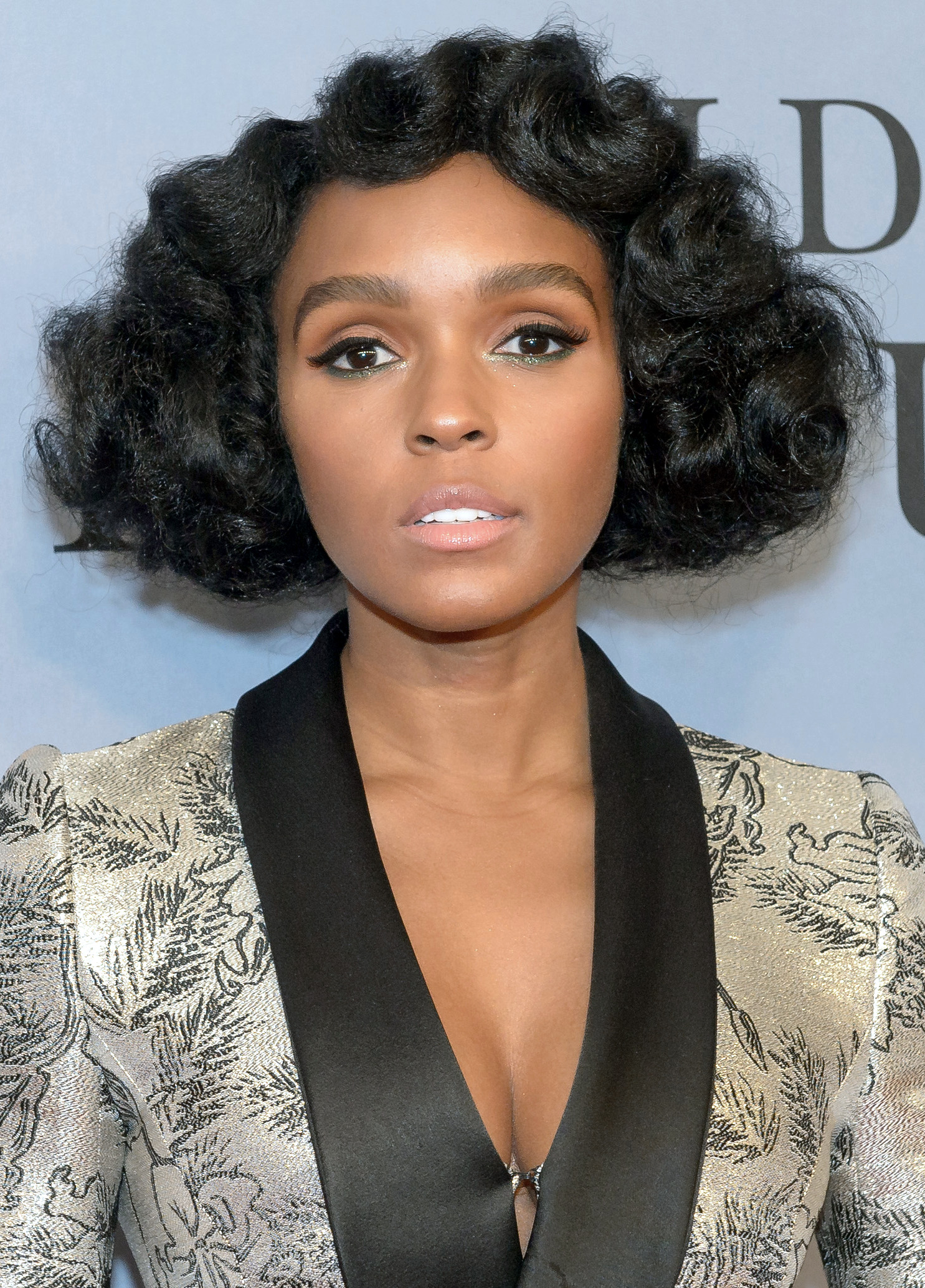
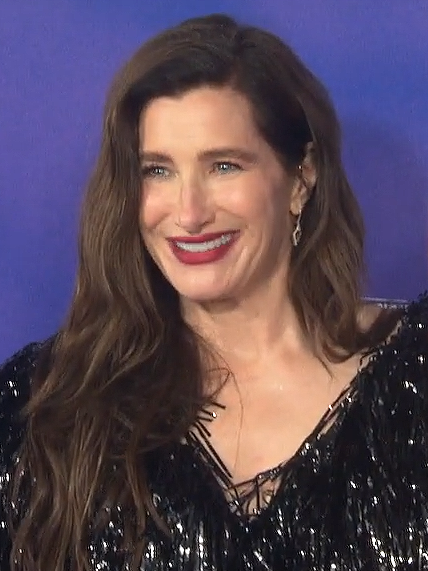
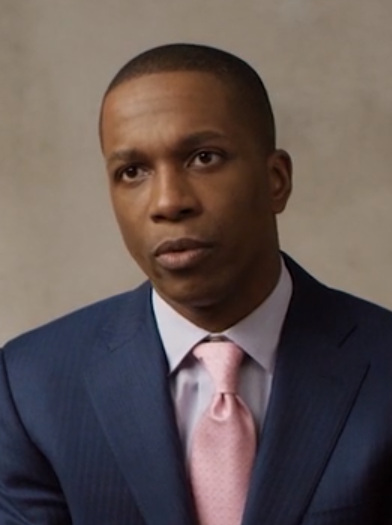
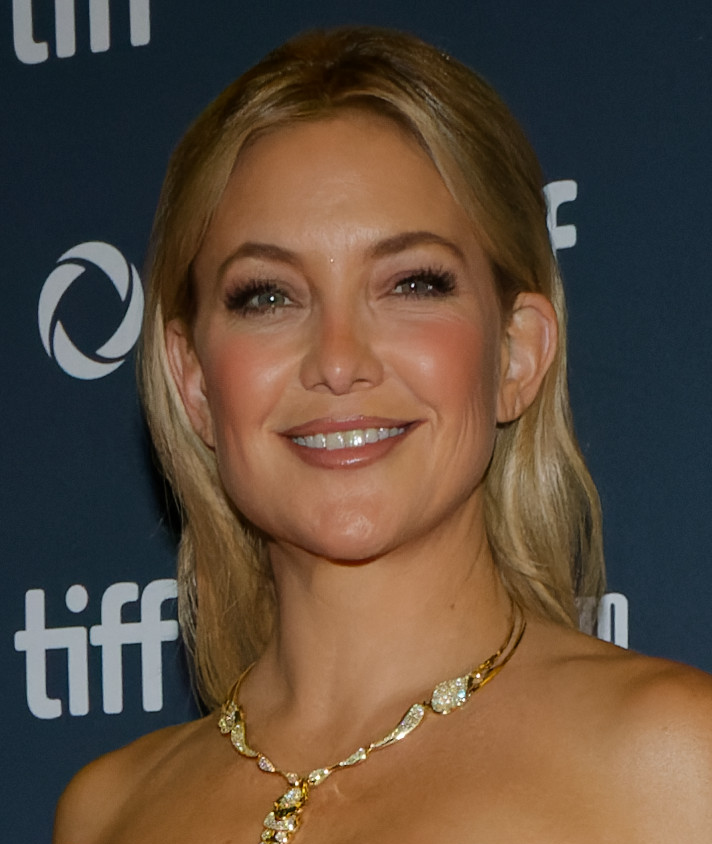
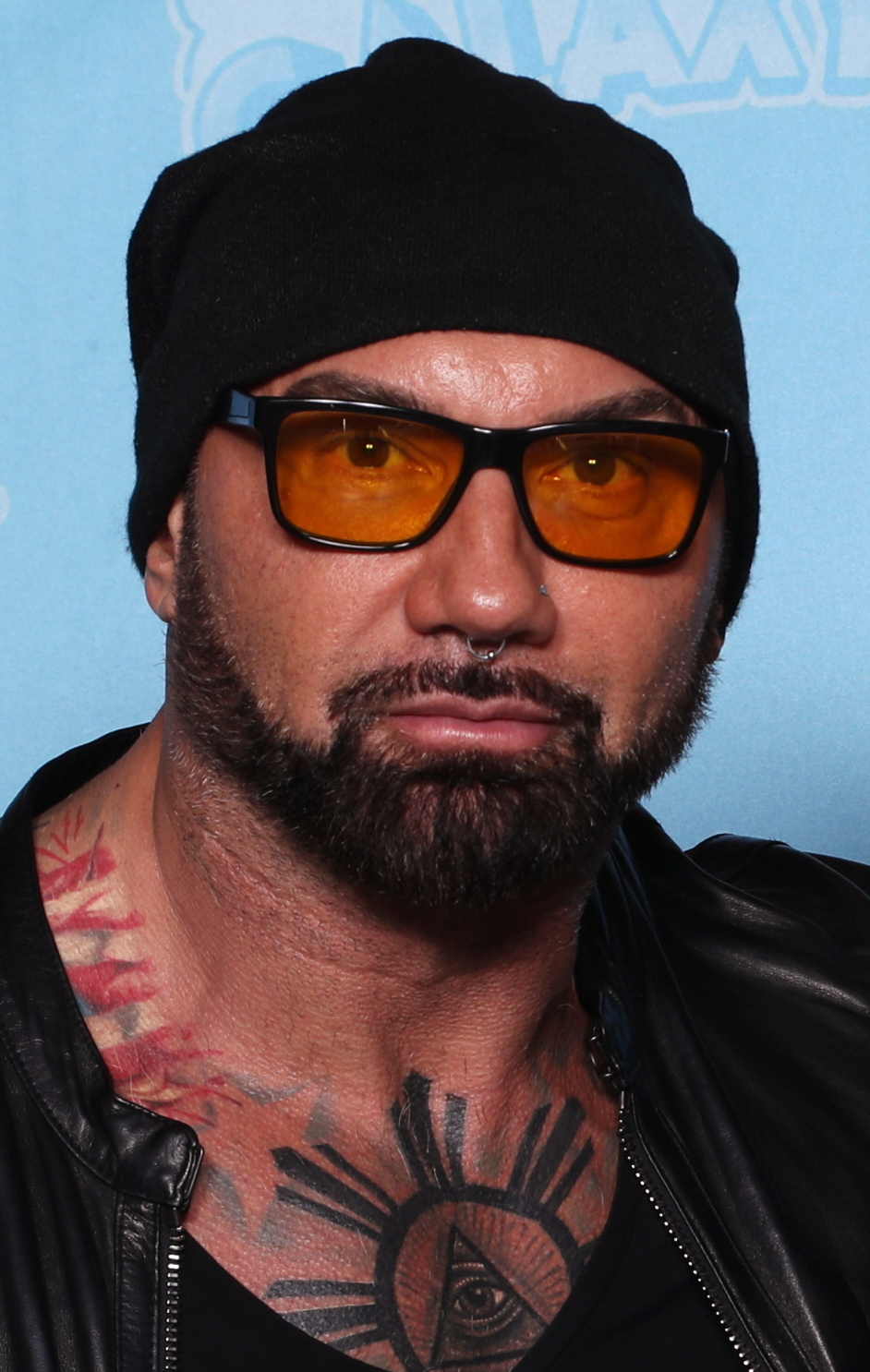
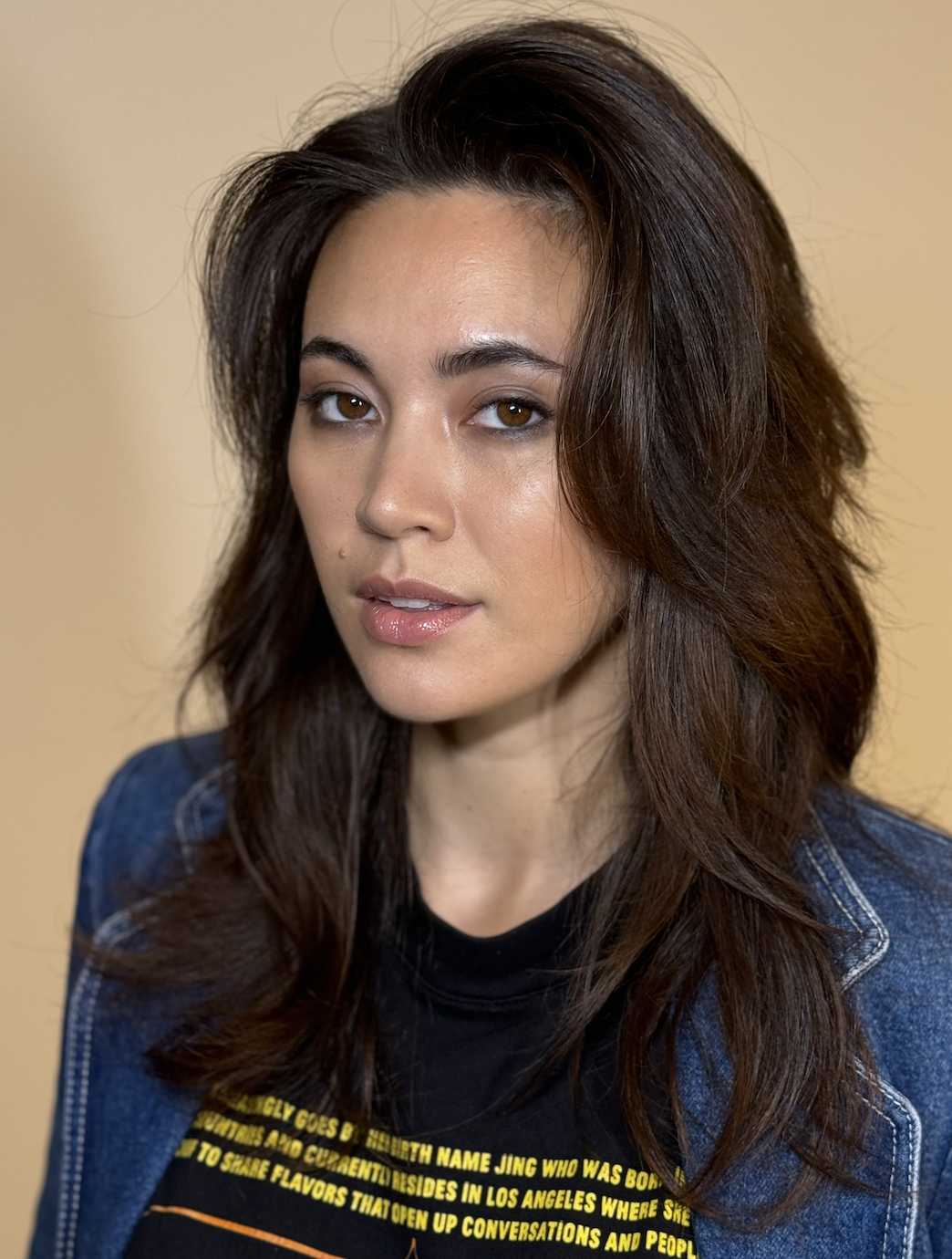
Daniel Craig (in 2021), Edward Norton (in 2025), Janelle Monáe (in 2016), Kathryn Hahn (in 2024), Leslie Odom Jr. (in 2016), Kate Hudson (in 2024), Dave Bautista (in 2019), and Jessica Henwick (in 2023)
- Daniel Craig as Benoit Blanc, a private investigator
- Edward Norton as Miles Bron, a billionaire and owner of Alpha, a large technology company
- Janelle Monáe as:
  - Helen Brand, Andi's identical twin sister, an elementary school teacher from Alabama
  - Andi Brand, Helen's identical twin sister, co-founder of Alpha and Miles's ex-business partner
- Kathryn Hahn as Claire Debella, the governor of Connecticut, now running for the United States Senate
- Leslie Odom Jr. as Lionel Toussaint, the head scientist for Miles's company
- Kate Hudson as Birdie Jay, a hedonistic, politically incorrect former supermodel turned fashion designer in New York
- Dave Bautista as Duke Cody, a video game streamer and men's rights activist on Twitch and YouTube
- Jessica Henwick as Peg, Birdie's assistant
- Madelyn Cline as Whiskey, Duke's girlfriend and Twitch channel assistant
- Noah Segan as Derol, a slacker who lives on Miles's island. Segan previously appeared in Knives Out (2019) as Trooper Wagner
- Jackie Hoffman as Mrs. Cody, Duke's mother
- Dallas Roberts as Devon Debella, Claire's husband

Additionally, Ethan Hawke appears briefly as Miles's assistant (credited as "Efficient Man"), Hugh Grant cameos as Phillip, Blanc's domestic partner, and Joseph Gordon-Levitt voices Miles's clock, the Hourly Dong (Gordon-Levitt had a vocal cameo in the previous film as Detective Hardrock). Several celebrities make cameo appearances as themselves, including Stephen Sondheim, Angela Lansbury, Natasha Lyonne, Kareem Abdul-Jabbar, Yo-Yo Ma, Jake Tapper, and Serena Williams. Sondheim and Lansbury both died before Glass Onion was released, and the film is dedicated to both of them. Jared Leto and Jeremy Renner's likenesses appear on bottles of kombucha and hot sauce, respectively. (Jeremy Renner also portrays Dr. Nat Sharp in the third Knives Out movie, Wake Up Dead Man.)

== Production ==
=== Development ===
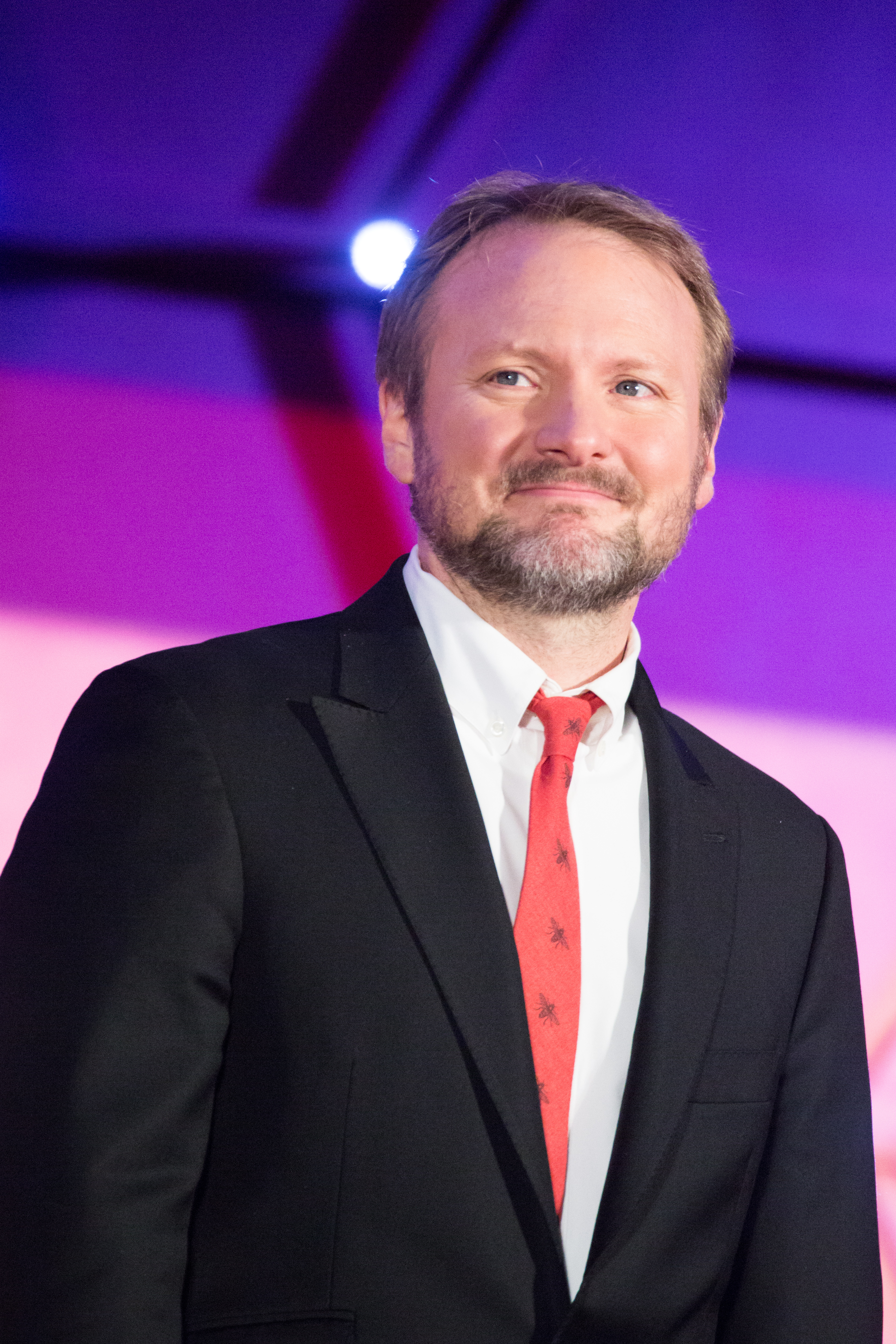
Writer, director, and producer Rian Johnson

Knives Out (2019) was a commercial success for MRC and Lionsgate Films, grossing $311 million on a budget of $40 million to become the year's second-highest-grossing film not based on existing intellectual property. Before its release, writer and director Rian Johnson had teased the possibility of a sequel revolving around the lead character, Detective Benoit Blanc. Lionsgate officially greenlit the sequel in early 2020.

In March 2021, Netflix outbid Amazon and Apple at an auction to acquire the rights to the film and another sequel to Knives Out for $469 million, with Johnson returning as director, Daniel Craig set to reprise his role as Blanc, and a budget of at least $40 million for each installment. Johnson, Craig, and the producer Ram Bergman reportedly earned more than $100 million for both productions. A losing bidder called it an inexplicable, "mind-boggling" deal.

Craig worked with a dialect coach to regain familiarity with Blanc's Southern accent. Johnson previously considered having Blanc speak with an inexplicably different accent in each film.

=== Writing ===
Johnson wrote Glass Onion in 2020 during the COVID-19 lockdown, with its setting of Greece coming from a desire to travel abroad when international travel had been shut down. His writing began from the premise that he wanted to write a whodunnit "vacation mystery" in the style of stories Johnson loves such as Evil Under the Sun (1941), Death on the Nile (1937) and The Last of Sheila (1973). Johnson made it clear that Glass Onion was not a continuation of its predecessor but a standalone film featuring a new story and cast, similar to the Hercule Poirot novel series by Agatha Christie.

In addition to Christie novels, he took inspiration from "tropical getaway murder mysteries" like Guy Hamilton's 1982 film adaptation of Christie's Evil Under the Sun and especially The Last of Sheila, saying: "It's structured around a group of friends, or frenemies, who all have a power dynamic with one of their successful friends. It begins with him inviting them to come and play this murder mystery game at this exotic locale. In The Last of Sheila, it's on his yacht, and everything ends up going horribly wrong. That is essentially how Glass Onion begins." Johnson wanted the film's title to refer to something hidden in plain sight. He chose "glass" because it is clear. He searched his phone for songs with the word, finally settling on "Glass Onion" by the Beatles. The song is featured in the end credits.

The character of Benoit Blanc was revealed as gay in the film. Johnson said this "did not feel like a big decision" and "felt very natural" when depicting Blanc's home life.

=== Casting ===
Johnson described casting the film as "throwing a dinner party". Dave Bautista said Johnson encouraged him to audition during an unprompted call, and Kathryn Hahn secured her role over several Zoom calls with Johnson.

=== Filming ===
Returning Knives Out crew members included cinematographer Steve Yedlin, editor Bob Ducsay, and composer Nathan Johnson. Filming began on Spetses, an island in Greece, on June 28, 2021. Johnson discovered the Amanzoe's Villa 20 in Porto Heli and decided to use it as a major filming location. It also housed the cast and their families for the majority of the shoot, which Johnson described as "a summer vacation where we also made a movie". The shoot moved out of Greece on July 30 to continue shooting interior and New York scenes in Belgrade, and wrapped officially on September 13, 2021.

In addition to the title, the film contains references to other songs by the Beatles: two of the glass sculptures include a walrus ("I Am the Walrus") and strawberries ("Strawberry Fields Forever"), and the switch that controls the safety enclosure around the Mona Lisa is modeled as "The Fool on the Hill". The title song ("Glass Onion") also references these songs.

=== Music ===
Rian's cousin and frequent collaborator, Nathan Johnson, returned to score Glass Onion; it marks their fifth collaboration after Brick (2005), The Brothers Bloom (2009), Looper (2012), and the predecessor, Knives Out (2019). Netflix Music released the album on November 25, 2022.

Other songs featured in the film include "To Love Somebody" by the Bee Gees; "Star" and "Starman" by David Bowie; "Take Me Home, Country Roads" by Toots and The Maytals; and "Mona Lisa" by Nat King Cole. Edward Norton plays "Blackbird" by The Beatles and "Under the Bridge" by Red Hot Chili Peppers on guitar. "Glass Onion" by The Beatles plays during the end credits.

== Release ==
=== Marketing ===
A Glass Onion teaser trailer was released on September 8, 2022, followed by a full trailer on November 7.

Johnson said he was "pissed" that "A Knives Out Mystery" was added as a subtitle to the film's marketing materials, and he originally intended the film's title to simply be "Glass Onion", as it is a standalone story. While he said he understood the need for audiences to understand that Glass Onion was part of a series, he felt that "the whole appeal to me is it's a new novel off the shelf every time", and that there is an industry trend with "the gravity of a thousand suns toward serialized storytelling".

=== Theatrical and streaming ===
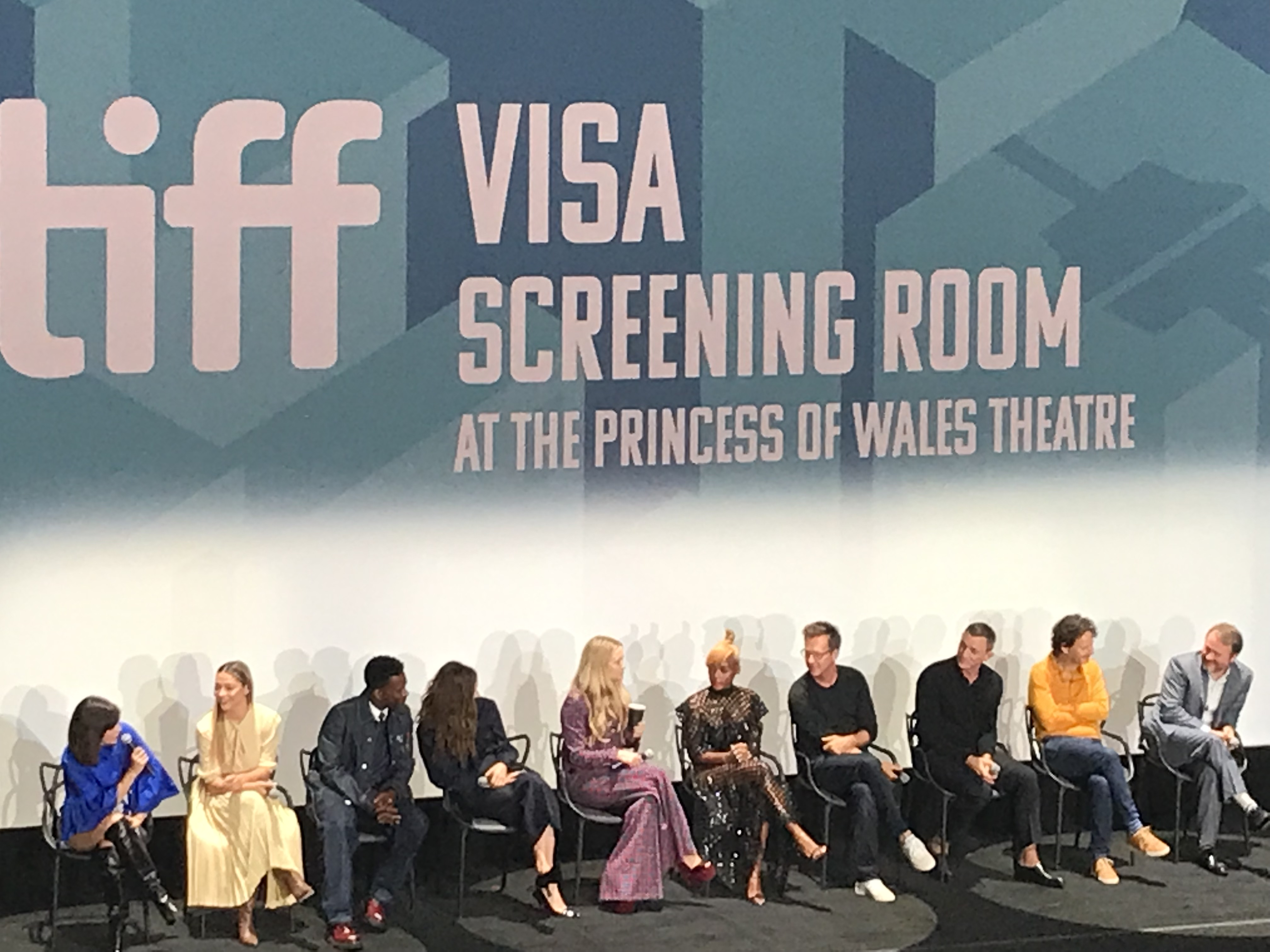
Rian Johnson and most of the main cast at TIFF 2022

Glass Onion premiered at the Toronto International Film Festival on September 10, 2022. It also screened at the Philadelphia Film Festival in October 2022, closed the BFI London Film Festival on October 16 and Film Fest 919 on October 30, and screened at the Miami International Film Festival as its opening night film on November 3. The Los Angeles premiere took place at the Academy Museum of Motion Pictures on November 14. It was released on Netflix on December 23, 2022. Over its first 10 days of digital release, the film logged over 209.5 million hours viewed worldwide. Between January and June 2023, the film totaled 142.9 million hours watched (equal to 61.7 million views).

Netflix was reportedly considering a new release model for films like Glass Onion, which would give the film a 45-day window in theaters before being released on the streaming service. On October 6, 2022, Netflix announced that, after signing deals with the three largest theater chains in the United States (AMC Theaters, Regal Cinemas, and Cinemark, the latter with whom Netflix had a pre-existing deal), the film would see a limited, one-week theatrical release (billed as a "sneak preview" release) from November 23 to 29 in roughly 600 theaters in the largest markets across the United States, as well in other international markets, marking the first time a Netflix-distributed film would be shown in all three major theater chains in the United States. After the release was over, Netflix would then pull the film from distribution until the Netflix release on December 23. At that point, Netflix would allow theaters to show the film again. Deadline later reported that Netflix agreed to take a lower amount of the rental revenue than usual from theaters (40% vs. 60–70%), as well as to kick in four times the average amount of money for exhibitor marketing. Deadline also reported that some smaller exhibitors that were interested in playing the film were shut out from the one-week limited release, as Netflix preferred more popular theaters for Glass Onion.

=== Home media ===
On December 23, 2022, in an interview with TheWrap, Johnson and Bergman confirmed that discussions between Netflix and the creatives about a possible Blu-ray release of the film had taken place, with Bergman saying: "There have been conversations but no results yet. I really hope we can do it. We've got plenty of good stuff to fill out a disc if anyone's interested." Johnson—a longtime advocate of physical media—also was hopeful, saying that, even if it does not come to fruition, he will strive to make an audio commentary available in some form.

== Reception ==
=== Box office ===
In the United States and Canada, Glass Onion was released alongside Strange World, Devotion, Bones and All and The Fabelmans, and was initially projected to gross around $6–8 million from 698 theaters over its five-day opening weekend. As with their other theatrical releases, Netflix did not release any box office numbers for the film. Deadline Hollywood reported that the film made an estimated $2–2.5 million on its first day, which led to estimates being raised to as much as $12.3 million. The Hollywood Reporter later reported that the film went on to debut with an estimated $13.1 million over the five-day weekend, which would be the best-performing theatrical release for Netflix, and third for the weekend had Netflix officially released box office numbers, behind Black Panther: Wakanda Forever and Strange World.

=== Critical response ===
Glass Onion: A Knives Out Mystery received positive reviews from film critics. On the review aggregator website Rotten Tomatoes, 91% of 438 critics' reviews are positive, with an average rating of 8.0/10. The website's consensus reads: "Glass Onion brings back Benoit Blanc for another wildly entertaining mystery rounded out by an outstanding ensemble cast." Metacritic, which uses a weighted average, assigned the film a score of 81 out of 100, based on 62 critics, indicating "universal acclaim".

Variety's Owen Gleiberman praised the film as "a bigger, showier, even more elaborately multi-faceted shell-game mystery" than the first film. Christy Lemire of RogerEbert.com gave the film 3 out of 4 stars, writing: "The clever details, amusing name-drops, and precisely pointed digs at vapid celebrity culture keep Johnson's movie zippy when it threatens to drag." Writing for The Guardian, Peter Bradshaw gave the film 4 out of 5 stars and said: "Glass Onion is never anything less than entertaining, with its succession of A-lister and A-plus-lister cameos popping up all over the place. And Johnson uncorks an absolute showstopper of a flashback a half-hour or so into the action, which then unspools back up to the present day, giving us all manner of cheeky POV-shift reveals."

The film's characters and plot have been likened to current business magnates. Calder McHugh of Politico described the film as "an allegory for all of us living with the omnipresent Elon Musk, Donald Trump, and Jeff Bezos", while James Downie of MSNBC claimed Norton's character Miles Bron's "mixture of bluster, hubris, and half-baked ideas will likely bring to mind Twitter owner and part-time car enthusiast Elon Musk." Of the film's relevance to Elon Musk's 2022 takeover of Twitter, Rian Johnson commented, "A friend of mine said, 'Man, that feels like it was written this afternoon.' And that's just sort of a horrible, horrible accident, you know?" Shirley Li of The Atlantic praised the film for "observing the absurd privileges of wealth and skewering the ignorance of the 1 percent" such as in the "overflowing smarm" of Edward Norton's performance as Miles Bron. Clay Cockrell, a therapist for rich people said, writing in The Guardian, that the film illustrated how the very rich could not trust either their pre-wealth friends, or new friends, as he had seen in real life.

=== Accolades ===
At the 95th Academy Awards, the film received a nomination for Best Adapted Screenplay. Its other nominations include six Critics' Choice Movie Awards (winning two) and two Golden Globe Awards. The film was named one of the ten best films of 2022 by the National Board of Review, and Janelle Monáe won the National Board of Review Award for Best Supporting Actress for her performance.

== Sequel ==
Netflix holds the film rights to at least one more film in the series. In September 2022, Johnson confirmed his intention to make more, and, later that month, he and Craig separately said they would continue making further films in the series, so long as they were both involved together. In November 2022, Johnson said he was preparing to work on writing the third film, and, by January 2023, he confirmed he had started writing the script for the third film, stating that it will be tonally and thematically different from the previous installments. Johnson later stated that, although he had approved the subtitle "A Knives Out Mystery" for Glass Onion, he would like to rename the series and add, instead, "A Benoit Blanc Mystery" as a subtitle to future installments.

In October 2023, Johnson spoke further about the progress of Knives Out 3 in TheWrap: "I obviously couldn't work during the Writers Guild of America strike, and now that it's over, I'm diving in full force, and so it's coming along. I've got the premise, I've got the setting, I've got what the movie is in my head. It's just a matter of writing the damn thing." In May 2024, the third film's title was announced as Wake Up Dead Man: A Knives Out Mystery. In development since 2023, filming started in June 2024 and wrapped in August 2024, in London, and the film scheduled to be released in 2025. It co-stars Josh O'Connor, Cailee Spaeny, Andrew Scott, Kerry Washington, Glenn Close, Jeremy Renner, Mila Kunis, Daryl McCormack, Josh Brolin, and Thomas Haden Church. Similarly to how the first two films in the series were named after songs, Wake Up Dead Man shares the same title as the closing track of U2's 1997 album Pop.
