= Echoes of Violence =

- Directed by: Nicholas Woods
- Written by: Nicholas Woods
- Produced by: Nicholas Woods
- Starring: Michaella Russell
- Distributed by: 1091 Pictures
- Release date: August 24, 2021
- Running time: 106 minutes
- Country: United States
- Language: English

Echoes of Violence is a 2021 American crime thriller drama film written and directed by Nicholas Woods and starring Michaella Russell.

== Cast ==
- Michaella Russell as Marakya
- Heston Horwin as Alex
- Chase Cargill as Kellin
- Taylor Flowers as Anthony
- Sam Anderson as Conroy
- Frank Oz as Dante

== Release ==
The film was released on digital on August 24, 2021.

== Reception ==
Bobby LePire of Film Threat rated the film a 9 out of 10.
