= John Baldecchi =

Film producer

John Baldecchi is a film producer known for The Mexican (2001) and Point Break (2015). He is an executive producer on Happy Death Day (2017) and the sequel, Happy Death Day 2U (2019) along with Jason Blum with Blumhouse Productions and Universal Studios.

== Career ==
Baldecchi worked for Laurence Mark Productions producing The Adventures of Huck Finn and the sequel Tom and Huck, Gunmen, Oliver Twist, Deep Rising and Simon Birch. After being named President of Production, the company produced Jerry Maguire and As Good as It Gets.

Baldecchi partnered with Lawrence Bender in a production deal at Fox 2000 and together they made The Mexican and Stark Raving Mad. Baldecchi then segued into a long-term production deal at Sony Pictures and started the sales, finance, production outfit Fusion Films. Baldecchi produced UltraViolet, Odd Thomas, Conan the Barbarian, 88 Minutes, and Point Break.

Baldecchi founded Digital Riot Media with Doug Barry in 2016. The company produced the digital feature FML. The next two features produced were Happy Death Day and the sequel Happy Death Day 2 U. In February 2022, Baldecchi along with Dominic Ianno, John Baldecchi, Alex Dundas and Griffin Gmelich, partnered to launch a Los Angeles film and television production company, Roundtable Entertainment.

== Filmography ==
| Year | Title | Role |
| 1993 | The Adventures of Huck Finn | Co-producer |
| 1993 | Gunmen | Co-producer |
| 1995 | Silo 3 Jane | Producer |
| 1995 | Tom and Huck | Producer |
| 1995 | Cutthroat Island | Co-producer |
| 1997 | Oliver Twist | Producer |
| 1998 | Deep Rising | Producer |
| 1998 | Simon Birch | Executive producer |
| 2001 | The Mexican | Producer |
| 2002 | Stark Raving Mad | Producer |
| 2006 | Ultraviolet | Producer |
| 2007 | 88 Minutes | Executive producer |
| 2011 | Conan the Barbarian | Producer |
| 2013 | Odd Thomas | Producer |
| 2015 | Point Break | Producer |
| 2016 | FML | Producer |
| 2017 | Happy Death Day | Executive producer |
| 2019 | Happy Death Day 2U | Executive producer |
| 2020 | Children of the Corn | Producer |
| 2024 | AMFAD All My Friends Are Dead | Producer, actor |
| 2027 | Twilight of the Dead | Producer |
