= The Last Mrs. Parrish =

- Directed by: Robert Zemeckis
- Screenplay by: Andrea Berloff; John Gatins
- Based on: The Last Mrs. Parrish by Liv Constantine
- Produced by: Liza Chasin; Elaine Goldsmith-Thomas; Jennifer Lopez; Benny Medina; Molly Sims
- Starring: Jennifer Lopez; Nikolaj Coster-Waldau; Isabel May; Pierson Fodé
- Cinematography: Don Burgess
- Production companies: ImageMovers; 3dot Productions; Nuyorican Productions; Something Happy Productions
- Distributed by: Netflix
- Country: United States
- Language: English

The Last Mrs. Parrish is an upcoming American crime thriller film directed by Robert Zemeckis. The screenplay by Andrea Berloff and John Gatins is based on the 2017 novel by Liv Constantine, the pen name of sisters Lynne and Valerie Constantine.

== Premise ==
A con artist's plan to scam a wealthy couple by becoming the husband's new wife is upended when she discovers the complexity of the wife's life.

== Cast ==
- Jennifer Lopez as Daphne Parrish
- Nikolaj Coster-Waldau as Jackson Parrish
- Isabel May as Amber Patterson
- Pierson Fodé
- Debi Mazar
- Denis O'Hare
- Frank Harts

== Production ==
In April 2025, it was announced that Netflix was developing the film, with Robert Zemeckis set to direct and Jennifer Lopez set to star. In September, Nikolaj Coster-Waldau, Isabel May, and Pierson Fodé joined the cast. Debi Mazar and Denis O'Hare were added to the cast in October.

Principal photography began in September 2025, in New Jersey with filming also taking place in New York City. Frequent Zemeckis collaborator Don Burgess served as cinematographer, shooting the film on RED Digital Cinema 8K cameras.
