= AMFAD All My Friends Are Dead =

2024 film by Marcus Dunstan

#AMFAD All My Friends Are Dead
- Theatrical release poster
- Directed by: Marcus Dunstan
- Written by: Josh Sims; Jessica Sarah Flaum
- Produced by: John Baldecchi; Sarah Donnelly; Kirk Shaw; Stephanie Rennie
- Starring: Jade Pettyjohn; JoJo Siwa
- Cinematography: Andy Hodgson
- Edited by: Andrew Coutts
- Music by: Philip Michael Thomas
- Production companies: Roundtable Entertainment; Film Mode Entertainment
- Distributed by: Cineverse
- Release dates: June 8, 2024 (Tribeca); August 2, 2024 (United States)
- Running time: 91 minutes
- Country: United States
- Language: English
- Box office: $156,188

#AMFAD All My Friends Are Dead is a 2024 American comedy horror film directed by Marcus Dunstan and written by Josh Sims and Jessica Sarah Flaum. It stars Jade Pettyjohn and JoJo Siwa.

It premiered at the Tribeca Film Festival on June 8, 2024, and was released by Cineverse on August 2, 2024.

== Plot ==
20 years after an unknown serial killer murdered seven people at a music festival with murders based on the Seven Deadly Sins, the music festival is hosted once again. A group of influencers, being made up of Sarah, Mona, Will, Liv, L.B. and Guy, plan to head to their festival; their friend Aaron is unable to come due to his job. On the way there, their car breaks down and a police officer drives them to a nearby Airbnb for them to spend the night at; however, they cannot attend the festival. Unbeknownst to them, they are being observed via hidden cameras by an unseen person.

The group finds shot glasses labelled after the Seven Deadly Sins and, after designating each glass to a group member with the exception of one, spend the night consuming alcohol and drugs. Guy, who is heavily high, leaves in an attempt to catch a ride to the music festival but is abducted by the person, a masked killer wearing an LED mask who pumps a gas into Guy's stomach until it explodes. While L.B. and Mona are having sex, with L.B. filming it, Mona sees the killer in the background of the recording. The group receives a message from someone claiming to be Collette, a former member of the friend group; Mona reveals that after she violently rejected her, Collette died of suicide by shooting herself in the cabin where the group used to spend time. Liv is kidnapped as she tries to leave and is tied under a vat of boiling water, with the killer challenging the internet to get the stream to 1000 likes; although the stream reaches the goal, Mona doesn't believe it's real and dislikes it, causing the count to go down; the killer allows the water to melt through Liv's skin.

Aaron leaves his job and begins to drive in the direction of the Airbnb. L.B. is stabbed by the killer with a bladed dildo after being lured upstairs, who then beats him to death with a baseball bat; Aaron arrives and discovers the corpse. Sarah, Mona, Will, and Aaron discover a hidden door to a basement filled with monitors, all showing Collette's face and videos of the group. Under pressure from Sarah, who doesn't know what's going on, the group reveals that Collette sent Mona a nude video, which the group uploaded to the Internet, ruining Collette's life; attempting to make amends, they headed to her cabin only to discover her dead, having carved their names into the wood. Hiding their involvement, the group burned down the cabin.

Realizing the motive for the murders, Sarah berates Mona; they find the bodies of their friends before the killer arrives, killing Will and Liv, who was badly wounded, with an axe. As they attempt to escape the basement, Mona throws down Aaron onto the killer, who stabs him to death before all three fall into the basement. Mona unmasks the killer, revealing them to be the police officer from earlier, Lois Shaw. Shaw and Mona enter a scuffle and Mona throws a knife to Sarah; however, Sarah slits Mona's throat instead. She reveals to Mona that she and Shaw planned the entire night as revenge after Shaw saved her from suicide, using the style of a serial killer 20 years prior in order to frame it as a copycat killer. Sarah allows Mona to die of blood loss before she and Shaw set up the scene to make her the sole survivor.

Some time later, police officers (including Shaw) arrive and investigate the scene. Shaw pulls Sarah off to the side as they kiss, only for Sarah to reveal one additional piece of information; having found out about Collette's torment, Sarah had lured Mona to the cabin with the intention of killing her. However, Collette intercepted the message and in the process was accidentally shot and killed by Sarah, who framed it as a suicide and blamed the friends for everything; in order to not leave any witnesses, Sarah glues Shaw's gun to her own hand and frames her as the killer, causing a detective to shoot her dead. Sarah stands over her corpse and smiles, telling her that "all my friends are dead".

In a mid-credits scene, Sarah receives a phone call from the original killer, who threatens to kill everybody she knows.

== Cast ==
- Jade Pettyjohn as Sarah
- JoJo Siwa as Collette
- Jennifer Ens as Mona
- Justin Derickson as Will
- Ali Fumiko Whitney as Liv
- Julian Haig as L.B.
- Michaella Russell as officer Shaw
- Cardi Wong as Aaron
- Jack Doupe-Smith as Guy
- Pete Graham as Detective Daniels

== Production ==
In March 2022, Deadline reported that Cineverse (then known as Cinedigm) and Roundtable Entertainment entered a $15 million 10-film deal to co-finance and co-own the intellectual property of original films, with AMFAD All My Friends Are Dead being the first to be produced from the deal. It was fully financed by Film Mode Entertainment, Banc of California and Budding Equity, among others. The screenplay was written by Josh Sims and Jessica Sarah Flaum. Kevin Greutert was originally attached to direct, but in October Marcus Dunstan was hired as a replacement.

In February 2023, Jade Pettyjohn and JoJo Siwa were cast in leading roles. That following May, Jennifer Ens, Ali Fumiko Whitney, Justin Derickson, Julian Haig, Cardi Wong, Jack Doupe-Smith and Michaella Russell were cast in supporting roles.

Principal photography was originally scheduled to begin in November 2022, but instead took place in Vancouver from May 3 to May 19, 2023. Rostislav Vaynshtok composed the film score.

== Release ==
Film Mode Entertainment screened the film for international buyers at the 2024 Berlin International Film Festival between February 15-19, 2024. It had its world premiere at the Tribeca Film Festival on June 8, 2024. It was released in select theaters and video on demand by Cineverse on August 2, 2024.

=== Box office ===
The film opened to $77,754 and finished its run at $156,188.

== Reception ==
On the review aggregator website Rotten Tomatoes, 50% of 18 critics' reviews are positive, with an average rating of 5.5/10.
