= PBC (web series) =

American web series

PBC is an American mockumentary workplace comedy web series produced by accounting software company FloQast, Inc. Billed as a show "by accountants, for accountants", the series was created by FloQast CEO Mike Whitmire. The ensemble cast, led by Jessica Sarah Flaum and Christian A. Pierce (co-creator of The Real Bros of Simi Valley), includes Pete Gardner, Danny Trejo, Kate Flannery, Creed Bratton, and Brittany Furlan. The series premiered on YouTube and the FloQast website in January 2022. A second season premiered in December 2022, with new cast additions including Cheri Oteri and Neil Flynn. A third season premiered in June 2026.
