= Michaella Rugwizangoga =

Rwandan engineer and media executive

Michaëlla Rugwizangoga
- Born: Rwanda
- Education: University of Kaiserslautern; Wharton School of the University of Pennsylvania
- Occupations: Engineer, Chief Executive
- Known for: First African woman CEO at Volkswagen; Tourism leadership
- Title: Chief Tourism Officer, Rwanda Development Board
- Awards: Choiseul Economic Leader of Tomorrow (2018, 2019)

Michaella Rugwizangoga is a Rwandan engineer with experience in strategic planning, project management and product development. She is currently the CEO of Volkswagen Mobility Solutions Rwanda, making her the first African woman CEO within the group.
