= Bob Ducsay =

American film producer

- Born: 1962 (age 63–64)
- Occupations: Film editor, screenwriter, film producer

Bob Ducsay (born c. 1962) is an American film editor, screenwriter and producer.

== Career ==
Ducsay has worked with Stephen Sommers, Rian Johnson and Brad Peyton. He has edited many of Sommers' films and has served as a producer on some, and has edited all of Johnson's films since Looper. He aspired to be in the filmmaking industry during high school. He graduated from St. Brendan High School in Miami, Florida, in 1980 and went on to film school.

He won the Saturn Award for Best Editing twice for Star Wars: The Last Jedi and Knives Out.

== Filmography ==
=== Film ===
Year	Title	Credited as	
Year	Title	Producer	Editor
1989	Catch Me If You Can	No	Yes
1992	The Finest Hour	No	Yes
1993	The Adventures of Huck Finn	No	Yes
1994	Love and a .45	No	Yes
1994	The Jungle Book	No	Yes
1996	Tremors 2: Aftershocks	No	Yes
1997	Vegas Vacation	No	Yes
1997	Star Kid	No	Yes
1998	L.A. Doctors	No	Yes
1998	Deep Rising	No	Yes
1999	Bats	No	Yes
1999	The Mummy	No	Yes
2001	The Mummy Returns	No	Yes
2001	Impostor	No	Yes
2004	Van Helsing	Yes	Yes
2004	Revenge of the Mummy	No	Yes
2008	The Mummy: Tomb of the Dragon Emperor	Yes	No
2009	G.I. Joe: The Rise of Cobra	Yes	Yes
2011	Season of the Witch	No	Yes
2012	Looper	No	Yes
2013	Jack the Giant Slayer	No	Yes
2014	Godzilla	No	Yes
2015	San Andreas	No	Yes
2016	Teenage Mutant Ninja Turtles: Out of the Shadows	No	Yes
2017	Star Wars: The Last Jedi	No	Yes
2018	Rampage	No	Yes
2019	Godzilla: King of the Monsters	No	Yes
2019	Knives Out	No	Yes
2021	Space Jam: A New Legacy	No	Yes
2022	Glass Onion	No	Yes
2024	Atlas	No	Yes
2025	Wake Up Dead Man	No	Yes
