= Michaella Russell =

South African actress

- Born: Johannesburg, South Africa
- Occupations: Actress, TV presenter
- Years active: 2012–present

Michaella Russell is a South African actress. She is best known for her role 'Charlie Holmes' in the popular television soap opera Isidingo.

== Early life ==
Russell was born in South Africa. Her father was a fighter-jet pilot who survived a plane crash but was left with a spinal fracture and memory loss due to brain damage. She has one sister. Her uncle is a jazz guitarist. She studied a double major in Neuropsychology and Economics. She suffered from an eating disorder from the age of 15 until she was 22.

== Career ==
Russell's first theater performance was at the age of eight or nine.

In 2013, she joined the cast of popular South African soapie Isidingo where she played the supportive role 'Charlie Holmes'. In 2016, she became a television presenter of the television program Funatix. In 2017, she starred in the American feature film Next Assignment Code Blue.

== Filmography ==
Year	Film	Role	Genre	Ref.
2017	Next Assignment: Project X	Jess	Short film	
2019	Agent	Mila Dior	TV series	
2020	It's Not You, It's Me	Electra	Film	
2021	Echoes of Violence	Marakya	Film	
2021	Lee'd the Way	Barb	Film	
2024	AMFAD All My Friends Are Dead	TBA	Film	
