= Ringo (disambiguation) =

Ringo Starr (born 1940) is an English drummer, singer, actor, and former member of The Beatles.

Ringo may also refer to:

== Places ==
- Ringō, Nan'yō, a town in Yamagata Prefecture, Japan
  - Ringō Station, a railway station
- Ringo, Kansas, United States, a census-designated place
- Ringo, Oklahoma, United States, a ghost town

== People ==
=== Nickname, stagename or pseudonym ===
- Ringo (singer) (born 1947), French singer of the 1970s and 1980s
- Rashad "Ringo" Smith (born 1972), American record producer
- Oscar Bonavena (1942–1976), Argentine boxer
- Mike Wieringo (1963–2007), American comic book artist, sometimes signed 'Ringo'
- Ringo Garza (born 1981), American drummer from Los Lonely Boys
- Ringo Madlingozi (born 1964), South African jazz musician and member of parliament
- Mahmood Abdulrahman (born 1984), Bahraini footballer
- Ringo Sheena (born 1978), Japanese singer, guitarist and pianist
- Ringo Cantillo (born 1956), American soccer player
- Alexanda Kotey (born 1983), a member of "the Beatles" terrorist cell
- Derick Adamson (born 1958), Jamaican marathon runner
- Ringo Mendoza (born 1949), Mexican wrestler

=== Surname ===
- Daniel Ringo (1803–1873), United States federal judge
- Diana Ringo (born 1992), Finnish film director and composer
- Frank Ringo (1860–1889), American baseball catcher
- Jerome Ringo (1955–2025), American environmentalist
- Jim Ringo (1931–2007), American football player
- John Ringo (born 1963), American author
- Johnny Ringo (1850–1882), American Old West outlaw who was murdered
- Johnny Ringo (musician) (born 1961), Jamaican reggae deejay
- Josef Ringo (1883–1946), Russian scientist, inventor, writer
- Kelee Ringo (born 2002), American football player
- Shirley Ringo (born 1940), American politician

=== Given name ===
- Ringo Aoba, Japanese voice actress
- Ringo Dămureanu (born 1973), Romanian politician
- Ringo Lam (1955–2018), Hong Kong film director, producer and scriptwriter
- Ringo Le, American filmmaker
- Ringo Lee Chiew Chwee, convicted murderer from Singapore

== Fictional characters ==
=== American wild west literature ===
- Ringo Kid, Marvel Comics gunslinger
- Jimmy Ringo, from the 1950 Western film The Gunfighter
- The Ringo Kid, from the 1939 Western film Stagecoach and its remakes
- Ringo, in the 1965 Spaghetti Western film A Pistol for Ringo and The Return of Ringo
- Lee "Ringo" Barton, in the 1965 Spaghetti Western 100.000 dollari per Ringo
- Johnny Ringo, in the 1966 Spaghetti Western Ringo and His Golden Pistol
- Ringo, in the 1968 Spaghetti Western Ringo the Lone Rider
- Ringo, in the 1967 Spaghetti Western Rita of the West
- Ringo, western comic by William Vance
- Ringo, subject of "Ringo" (Lorne Greene song), 1964

=== Other ===
- Ringo Akai, from the manga and anime series Tokyo Mew Mew
- Ringo Andou, from the Puyo Puyo video game series; see Puyo Puyo 7
- Ringo Brown, from the Australian soap opera Neighbours
- Ringo Noyamano, from the manga and anime series Air Gear
- Ringo Oginome, from the manga and anime series Mawaru Penguindrum
- Ringo Roadagain, a character from Steel Ball Run, a story arc of the Japanese manga series JoJo's Bizarre Adventure
- Ringo Seto, a character in Angelic Layer, a Japanese manga series
- Ringo, in the British sitcom Never the Twain
- Ringo, from Legacy of Lunatic Kingdom in the video game series Touhou Project
- Ringo, in the 2022 video game Soul Hackers 2

== Entertainment ==
- Ringo (game), a German board game
- Ringo, a British alternative rock band (1992–1994) fronted by Tim Keegan
- Ringo (Lorne Greene song), a 1964 single performed by Lorne Greene
- Ringo (album), a 1973 album by Ringo Starr
- Ringo (Itzy album), a 2023 album by Itzy
  - "Ringo" (Itzy song)
- Ringo (1978 film), a TV movie starring Ringo Starr
- Ringo (2005 film), a short film by Alf Seccombe and Conall Jones
- Ringo (TV series), a 2019 Mexican telenovela

== Other uses ==
- Nokia rinGo, a 1990s mobile phone
- Ringo R470, a computer similar to the Sinclair ZX81
- Ringo (software), defunct international calling app
- Ringo (sport), a Polish net sport
- Ringos, a brand name of a type of crisp manufactured by Golden Wonder

== See also ==
- Rango (disambiguation)
- Ring (disambiguation)
- Rongo
