= World Polonia Games =

Polish multi-sport event

World Polonia Games Światowe Igrzyska Polonijne
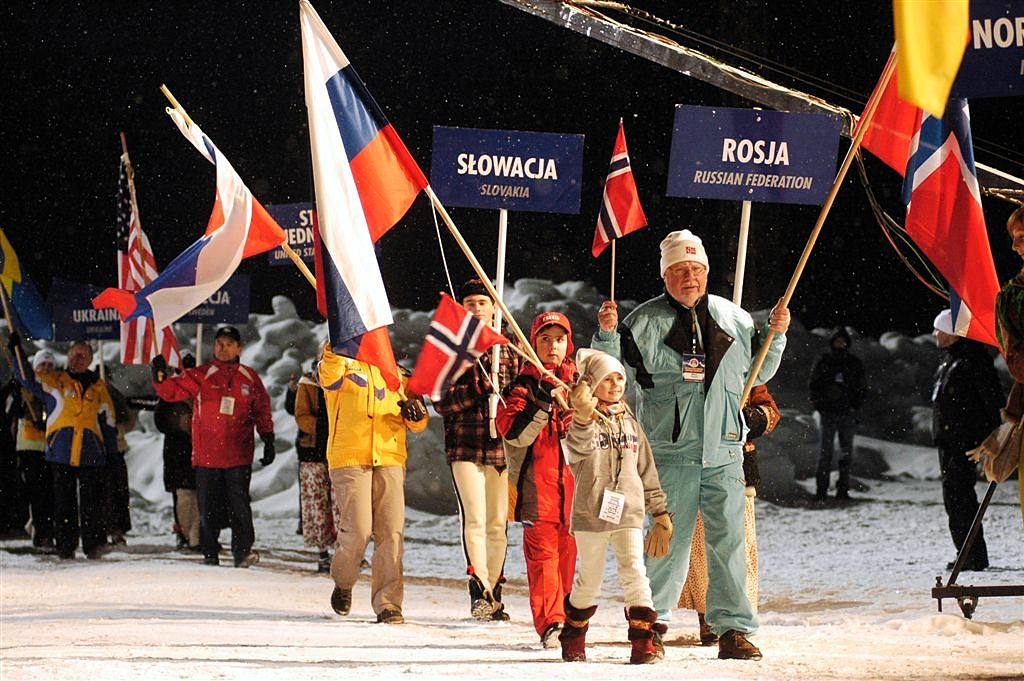
- Opening ceremony of the 2010 Winter World Polonia Games in Zakopane
- Status: Active
- Genre: Multi-sport event
- Frequency: Annual
- Location: Various
- Country: Poland
- Inaugurated: 1934; 92 years ago (summer); 1986; 40 years ago (winter)
- Organiser: Association "Polish Community"
- Website: World Polonia Games

The World Polonia Games (Polish: Światowe Igrzyska Polonijne) are a multi-sport event held annually for the Polish diaspora (Polonia) and Polish minorities living outside of Poland. Held annually and alternating between summer and winter games each year, the games bring together hundreds of participants from various countries worldwide.

The first World Polonia Games were held in 1934 in Warsaw, with 381 athletes from 13 countries. Following a four decade break, the games were revived in 1974 in Kraków and have been held more regularly since. Seventeen different host cities throughout Poland have hosted an installation of the event. Today, the games are organized by the Association "Polish Community" and are covered by TVP Polonia.

The XXI Summer World Polonia Games, its most recent installation, were held in August 2023 in Nysa and Wrocław. The most recent winter games, the XVI Winter World Polonia Games, were held in December 2024 in Wisła and Szczyrk, Silesian Voivodeship.

== History ==
=== Background and the first games ===
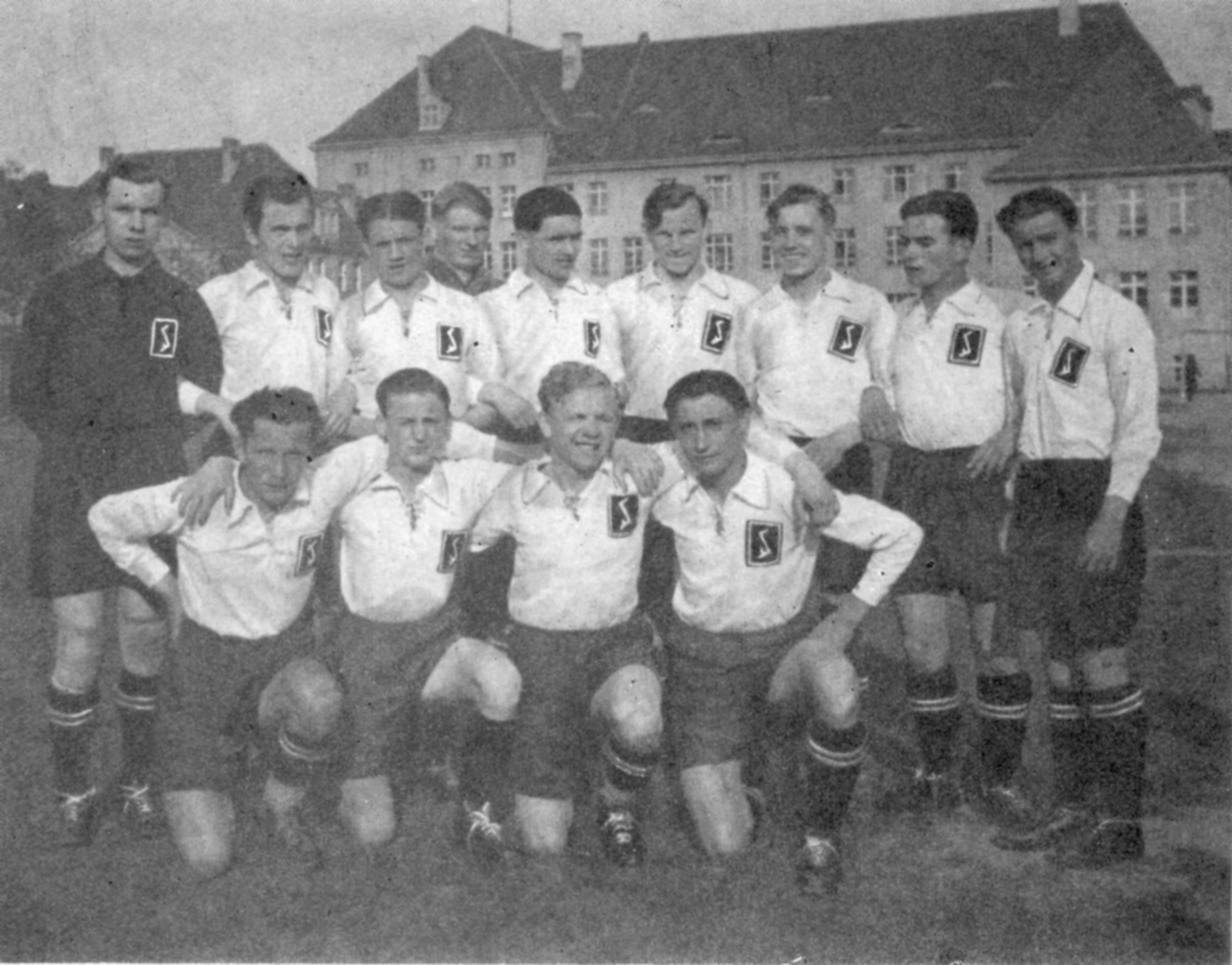
The German football team at the 1934 games in Warsaw.

As early as the turn of the century around 1900, during the period of the third partition of Poland, Polish athletes travelled to participate on sports competitions. For example, the "Meeting of the Polish Falconers' Union" (Zlot Sokolstwa Polskiego), which took place in Kraków in 1910 on the occasion of the 500th anniversary of the Battle of Tannenberg, in which around 10,000 Poles from Europe and the United States took part in. Sports and athleticism was developed in Poland in the 1930s, during the time of the independent Second Polish Republic, with the nation participating in the Olympic Games. The growing enthusiasm for sports led to the establishment of numerous Polish sports clubs in the diaspora.

At a "Congress of the Organizing Council of Poles Abroad” in Warsaw in 1933, the "First Polonia Sports Games" (I. Polonijne Igrzyska Sportowe, PIS) were organized for Poles living outside of Poland (including those from the Free City of Danzig). Its organizing committee was headed by the Marshal of the Senate Władysław Raczkiewicz. The firsrt games were held in 1934 in Warsaw, and 400 athletes took part from 13 nations worldwide. The opening ceremony on August 1, 1934, in Warsaw's Stadion Wojska Polskiego was attended by the President of Poland Ignacy Mościcki. The largest team was made up of Poles from the Free City of Danzig with 64 competitors, with the most successful teams being those from France, Danzig, and Czechoslovakia.

=== The modern games ===
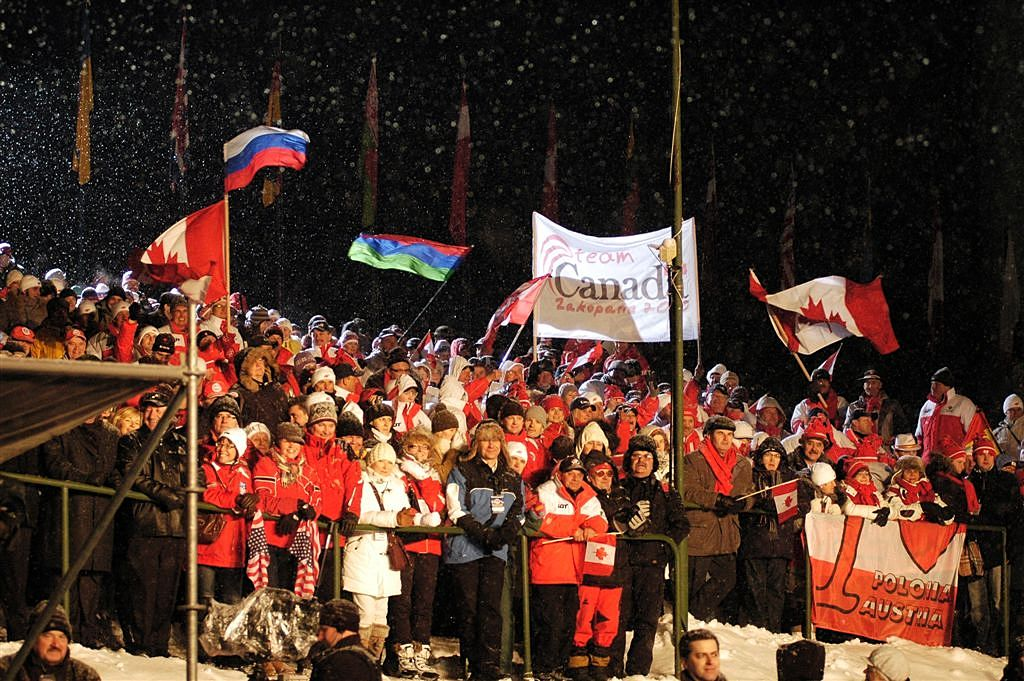
Team Canada at the opening ceremony of the 2010 Winter World Polonia Games in Zakopane.

The Second World War and post-war tension resulted in a four decade break in the games until its revival in 1974 in Kraków. Even then, authorities initially prevented the participation of Poles from the Soviet Union and its successor states until the nation's collapse in 1991. In 1986, the first winter World Polonia Games took place in Zakopane for the first time. They were originally held every three years from 1986 to 1992, but have now been held every two years since 2000 after an eight-year break.

In 1990, the association "Polish Community" (Stowarzyszenie "Wspólnota Polska") was founded in Warsaw, which organizes the World Games to this day. The aim of the association is to strengthen ties among Poles living abroad. The association's longtime chairman, the politician Andrzej Stelmachowski, campaigned for a revival of the Games in the 1990s. At the 1991 Summer Games, participants had the opportunity to meet Pope John Paul II, who was present at the event.

Since 1997, the main media patron and co-organizer of the games has been TVP Polonia. The games have been held annually, with the event alternating between summer and winter games each year, since 1999; Summer Games are held in odd-numbered years and Winter Games in even-numbered years. Games hosts vary, while the regular hosts of the Winter Games have been the Beskids (7 times; consisting of the cities of Bielsko Biała, Cieszyn, Szczyrk, Tychy, and Wisła together) and Zakopane (5 times). In 2018, the Winter Games were brought to Krynica-Zdrój for the first time.

The games continued throughout the COVID-19 pandemic and the 2022 Ukrainian refugee crisis, although to a reduced extent and with increased health and safety precautions in place for the 2020, 2021, and 2022 games. The games continued with their regular layout in 2023 with the XXI Summer World Polonia Games in Nysa and Wrocław.

== Sports ==
=== Summer Games ===
In addition to a children's and family tournament, the Summer Games have consisted of:

- Angling
- Archery
- Athletics
- Badminton
- Basketball
- Beach volleyball
- Bowling
- Chess
- Contract bridge
- Cue sports
- Equestrian
- Football
- Futsal
- Golf
- Handball
- Indoor rowing
- Kayaking
- Mountain biking
- Nordic walking
- Ringo
- Road cycling
- Sailing
- Shooting
- Swimming
- Table tennis
- Tennis
- Triathlon (or duathlon)
- Volleyball

=== Winter Games ===
In addition to a children's and family tournament, the Winter Games have consisted of:

- Alpine skiing
- Biathlon
- Cross-country skiing
- Ice hockey
- Ice skating
- Nordic walking
- Short track speed skating
- Ski jumping
- Snowboarding
- Speed skating

== Participating nations ==
The games are open to any Polish person or person of Polish descent who does not permanently live in Poland. Participating nations at the World Polonia Games have included those listed in the table below, with the numbers indicating how many times nations have topped a games medal table.

Participant nations at the World Polonia Games
- Albania
- Algeria
- Argentina
- Armenia
- Australia
- Austria
- Belarus (4)
- Belgium
- Bosnia and Herzegovina
- Brazil
- Bulgaria
- Canada (1)
- Chile
- China
- Croatia
- Czech Republic (12)
- Denmark
- Ecuador
- Egypt
- Estonia
- Finland
- France (1)
- Georgia
- Germany (4)
- Great Britain
- Greece
- Hungary
- Iceland
- Iran
- Ireland
- Israel
- Italy
- Japan
- Kazakhstan
- South Korea
- Latvia (1)
- Lithuania (3)
- Luxembourg
- Madagascar
- Malaysia
- Mexico
- Moldova
- Morocco
- Netherlands
- North Macedonia
- Norway
- Poland
- Romania
- Russia
  - Altai Republic
- Saudi Arabia
- Senegal
- Singapore
- South Africa
- Spain
- Sweden
- Switzerland
- Thailand
- Tunisia
- Turkey
- Ukraine
- United States

Defunct:

- Czechoslovakia (6)
- Danzig
- East Germany
- Manchukuo
- West Berlin
- West Germany

== Notable people ==
=== Participants ===
- Andżelika Borys (Belarus: 2011), Polish-Belarusian activist and president of the Union of Poles in Belarus
- Irène Debrunner (Switzerland: 1974), Swiss freestyle swimmer and Olympic athlete
- Stanisława Walasiewicz (United States: 1934, 1977), Polish-American track and field athlete and Olympic champion
- Bożena Wojciekian (Canada: 2011), Polish-Canadian shot putter

=== Attendees ===
- Bogdan Borusewicz (opened the 2011 Summer Games), Marshal of the Polish Senate
- Anna Gębala-Duraj (torchbearer and guest at the 2006 Winter Games), Polish cross-country skier and Olympic athlete
- Wiesław Gębala (torchbearer and guest at the 2006 Winter Games), Polish cross-country skier and Olympic athlete
- Pope John Paul II (guest at the 1991 Summer Games)
- Grzegorz Lato (guest at the 2011 Summer Games), Polish footballer and president of the Polish Football Association
- Lech Kaczyński (opened the 2010 Winter Games), President of Poland
- Longin Pastusiak (opened the 2004 Winter Games), Speaker of the Polish Senate
- Maciej Płażyński (opened the 2006 Winter Games), Deputy Speaker of the Polish Senate

Additional guests at the 2011 Summer Games opening ceremony in Wrocław included Jacek Bocian, Jan Brzeźny, Piotr Rysiukiewicz, Ryszard Szurkowski, and Urszula Włodarczyk. Numerous Polish Olympians were also present during the 2011 Summer Games, including Halina Aszkiełowicz-Wojno, Włodzimierz Chlebosz, Mariusz Jędra, Mieczysław Łopatka, Ryszard Podlas, and Leszek Swornowski.

== List of World Polonia Games ==
=== Summer Games ===
No.	Year	Host	Games dates	Disciplines	Competitors	Nations	Top nation
I	1934	(Masovian Voivodeship) Warsaw	1–8 Aug	7	381	13	France
~~II~~	1937	(Masovian Voivodeship) Warsaw	Postponed and later cancelled				
II	1974	(Lesser Poland Voivodeship) Kraków	17–21 Jul	11	319	13	Czechoslovakia
III	1977	(Lesser Poland Voivodeship) Kraków	17–20 Jul	12	687	15	Czechoslovakia
IV	1981	(Lesser Poland Voivodeship) Kraków	15–19 Jul	11	383	12	Czechoslovakia
V	1984	(Masovian Voivodeship) Warsaw	15–20 Jul	14	495	15	Czechoslovakia
VI	1987	(Lesser Poland Voivodeship) Kraków	26–31 Jul	16	1300	29	Czechoslovakia
VII	1991	(Lesser Poland Voivodeship) Kraków	4–12 Aug	12	271	14	Czechoslovakia
VIII	1997	(Lublin Voivodeship) Lublin	24–31 Aug	13	600	24	Belarus
IX	1999	(Lublin Voivodeship) Lublin	23–29 Aug	12	350	16	Latvia
X	2001	(Pomeranian Voivodeship) Sopot	29 Jul – 6 Aug	17	789	21	Germany
XI	2003	(Greater Poland Voivodeship) Poznań	26 Jul – 2 Aug	16	700	22	Belarus
XII	2005	(Masovian Voivodeship) Warsaw	6–14 Aug	18	1000	28	Belarus
XIII	2007	(Pomeranian Voivodeship) Słupsk	28 Jul – 4 Aug	21	1068	28	Germany
XIV	2009	(Kuyavian–Pomeranian Voivodeship) Toruń	1–9 Aug	23	1101	28	Germany
XV	2011	(Lower Silesian Voivodeship) Wrocław	29 Jul – 6 Aug	28	1682	31	Germany
XVI	2013	(Świętokrzyskie Voivodeship) Kielce	3–10 Aug	18	1000	30	Czech Republic
XVII	2015	(Lower Silesian Voivodeship) Silesia (Note: Hosted by the cities of Chorzów, Rybnik, Sosnowiec, and Wodzisław Śląski.)	2–8 Aug	20	800	29	Belarus
XVIII	2017	(Kuyavian–Pomeranian Voivodeship) Toruń	29 Jul – 6 Aug	23	1000	32	Czech Republic
XIX	2019	(Pomeranian Voivodeship) Gdynia	27 Jul – 4 Aug	22	1268	27	Czech Republic
XX	2021	(Masovian Voivodeship) Pułtusk	19–24 Sep	17	500	27	Czech Republic
XXI	2023	(Lower Silesian Voivodeship) Nysa-Wrocław	26 – 31 Aug		600	24	Czech Republic

=== Winter Games ===
No.	Year	Host	Games dates	Disciplines	Competitors	Nations	Top nation
I	1986	(Lesser Poland Voivodeship) Zakopane		6	200	10	n/a (Note: Team classification was not conducted at the first three installations of the World Polonia Winter Games.)
II	1989	(Lesser Poland Voivodeship) Zakopane		8	146	17	n/a
III	1992	(Lesser Poland Voivodeship) Zakopane	2–7 Feb	n/a (Note: Source material for the 1992 Games was lost.)			n/a
IV	2000	(Silesian Voivodeship) Beskids (Note: Hosted by the cities of Bielsko Biała, Cieszyn, Szczyrk, Tychy, and Wisła.)	28 Feb – 5 Mar	4	215	17	Czech Republic
V	2002	(Silesian Voivodeship) Beskids	1–6 Mar	6	550	20	Czech Republic
VI	2004	(Silesian Voivodeship) Beskids	28 Feb – 3 Mar	7	625	23	Czech Republic
VII	2006	(Silesian Voivodeship) Beskids	24 Feb – 2 Mar	7	664	24	Czech Republic
VIII	2008	(Silesian Voivodeship) Beskids	29 Feb – 5 Mar	7	500	20	Canada
IX	2010	(Lesser Poland Voivodeship) Zakopane	6–14 Mar	12	730	25	Czech Republic
X	2012	(Silesian Voivodeship) Beskids	25 Feb – 3 Mar	10	600	23	Lithuania
XI	2014	(Lower Silesian Voivodeship) Karkonosze (Note: Hosted by the cities of Jelenia Góra, Szklarska Poręba, Sobieszów, and Jablonec nad Jizerou (Czech Republic).)	23 Feb – 1 Mar	10	600	23	Lithuania
XII	2016	(Subcarpathian Voivodeship) Podkarpackie (Note: Hosted by the cities of Ustrzyki Dolne, Sanok, and Przemyśl.)	29 Feb – 4 Mar	12	500	16	Lithuania
XIII	2018	(Lesser Poland Voivodeship) Krynica-Zdrój	25 Feb – 1 Mar	9	546	22	Czech Republic
XIV	2020	(Lesser Poland Voivodeship) Krynica-Zdrój	20–23 Dec	4	120	10	n/a (Note: Team classification was not conducted at the XIV Winter Games because of its reduced size due to the COVID-19 pandemic.)
XV	2022	(Silesian Voivodeship) Wisła	27 Feb – 3 Mar	10	500	21	Czech Republic
XVI	2024	(Silesian Voivodeship) Wisła (Note: Hosted together with Szczryk.)	18 Dec – 22 Dec	5	250	15	Czech Republic

=== Host cities ===
Host cities of World Polonia Games
Host cities of Summer World Polonia Games	Host cities of Winter World Polonia Games

Number of occurrences

- (Lesser Poland Voivodeship) Małopolskie – 11 times (5 Summer; 6 Winter)
- (Silesian Voivodeship) Śląskie – 8 times (8 Winter)
- (Masovian Voivodeship) Masowieckie – 4 times (3 Summer; 1 Winter)
- (Lower Silesian Voivodeship) Dolnośląskie – 3 times (2 Summer; 1 Winter)
- (Pomeranian Voivodeship) Pomorskie – 3 times (3 Summer)
- (Kuyavian–Pomeranian Voivodeship) Kujawsko-Pomorskie – 2 times (2 Summer)
- (Lublin Voivodeship) Lubelskie – 2 times (2 Summer)
- (Subcarpathian Voivodeship) Podkarpackie – 1 time (1 Winter)
- (Świętokrzyskie Voivodeship) Świętokrzyskie – 1 time (1 Summer)
- (Greater Poland Voivodeship) Wielkopolskie – 1 time (1 Summer)

== Medal leaders by year ==
=== Summer Games ===
- 1934: France
- 1974: Czechoslovakia
- 1977: Czechoslovakia
- 1981: Czechoslovakia
- 1984: Czechoslovakia
- 1987: Czechoslovakia
- 1991: Czechoslovakia
- 1997: Belarus
- 1999: Latvia
- 2001: Germany
- 2003: Belarus
- 2005: Belarus
- 2007: Germany
- 2009: Germany
- 2011: Germany
- 2013: Czech Republic
- 2015: Belarus
- 2017: Czech Republic
- 2019: Czech Republic
- 2021: Czech Republic
- 2023: Czech Republic

=== Winter Games ===
- 1986: n/a
- 1989: n/a
- 1992: n/a
- 2000: Czech Republic
- 2002: Czech Republic
- 2004: Czech Republic
- 2006: Czech Republic
- 2008: Canada
- 2010: Czech Republic
- 2012: Lithuania
- 2014: Lithuania
- 2016: Lithuania
- 2018: Czech Republic
- 2020: n/a
- 2022: Czech Republic
- 2024: Czech Republic

== See also ==
- List of World Polonia Games records
- Polish diaspora (Polonia)
