= List of World Polonia Games records =

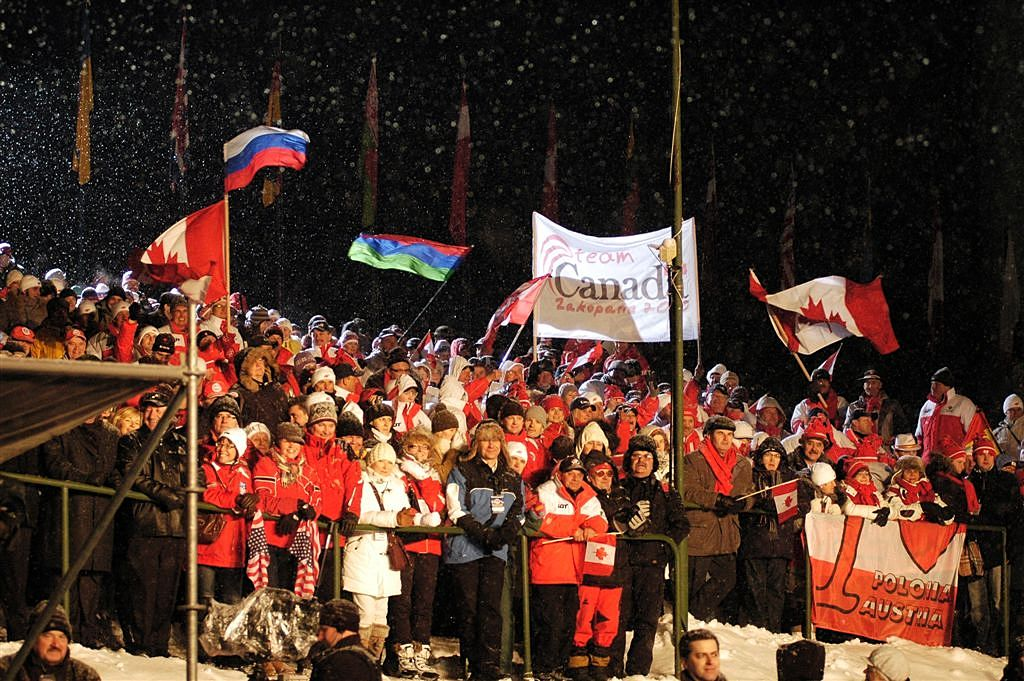
Team Canada at the opening ceremony of the 2010 Winter World Polonia Games in Zakopane. Canada currently holds the most records in swimming.

The World Polonia Games are a multi-sport event held annually for the Polish diaspora (Polonia) and Polish minorities living outside of Poland. Alternating between summer and winter games each year, the first edition of the games were held in Warsaw in 1934, and they have been played regularly since their revival in 1974. The games are organized by the Association "Polish Community" and are covered by TVP Polonia.

This article lists the records set at the World Polonia Games in athletics and swimming since 1934.

== Athletics ==
=== Men ===
Event	Time	Name	Nation	Games	Ref
100 metres	10.90	S Korus	France (FRA)	1977 Kraków	
200 metres	21.98	Endrik Zilbershtein	Georgia (GEO)	2011 Silesia	
400 metres	48.43	Endrik Zilbershtein	Georgia (GEO)	2011 Silesia	
800 metres	1:55.90	S Kaczmarek	Canada (CAN)	1974 Kraków	
1000 metres	2:59.92	Miroslaw Zinczinskij	Lithuania (LIT)	2019 Gdynia	
1,500 metres	4:03.72	P Maszaj	Belarus (BLR)	2003 Poznań	
3,000 metres	8:26.80	C Brodie	Great Britain (GBR)	1977 Kraków	
5,000 metres	15:13.65	P Maszaj	Belarus (BLR)	2003 Poznań	
10,000 metres	37:45.82	Adam Gaura	Czech Republic	2011 Silesia	
110 metres hurdles	15.14	A Domicz	Germany (GER)	2003 Poznań	
High jump	2.05 m	B Clients	Czechoslovakia (TCH)	1981 Kraków	
Long jump	6.98 m	G Sitkiewicz	Belarus (BLR)	1997 Lublin	
Pole vault	4.10 m	Michael Lopatowski	Canada (CAN)	2011 Silesia	
Shot put	17.22 m	J Pyka	United States (USA)	1977 Pułtusk	
Discus throw	51.04 m	A Drzewiecki	Canada (CAN)	1977 Kraków	
Hammer throw	40.65 m	J Krawczyk	France (FRA)	1981 Kraków	
Javelin throw	61.40 m	D Kolasniewski	France (FRA)	1974 Kraków	
Ball throw	17.22 m	J Pyka	United States (USA)	1977 Kraków	
4 x 100m relay	44.87	Gigła Zilbershtein Giorgi Zilbershtein Endrik Zilbershtein Ludvik Zilbershtein	Georgia (GEO)	2011 Silesia	
4 x 400m relay	3:26.60	Team United States	United States (USA)	1934 Warsaw	
Medley relay	2:21.03	Team Great Britain	Great Britain (GBR)	1999 Lublin	

=== Women ===
Event	Time	Name	Nation	Games	Ref
60 metres	8.30	I Waclawek	Czechoslovakia (TCH)	1981 Kraków	
100 metres	12.18	O Gorska	Moldova (MOL)	2001 Sopot	
200 metres	24.50	Stanisława Walasiewicz	United States (USA)	1934 Warsaw	
400 metres	54.43	A Kozak	Belarus (BLR)	1997 Lublin	
800 metres	2:12.01	J Krakowiak	Lithuania (LIT)	1997 Lublin	
1000 metres	3:27.02	Alexia Salwinowa	Moldova (MOL)	2019 Gdynia	
1,500 metres	4:42.82	N Wasilewska	Belarus (BLR)	2003 Poznań	
3,000 metres	12:13.51	Renata Siluk	Lithuania (LIT)	2011 Silesia	
5,000 metres	16:48.75	N Wasilewska	Belarus (BLR)	2003 Poznań	
110 m hurdles	16.57	Joanna Czapla	France (FRA)	2011 Silesia	
High jump	1.65 m	T Baranowska	Belarus (BLR)	1997 Lublin	
Long jump	5.49 m	K Bejnarowicz	Lithuania (LIT)	2001 Sopot	
Shot put	14.68 m	M Godzik	Belarus (BLR)	1997 Lublin	
Discus throw	36.69 m	O Kedzierska	Germany (GER)	2001 Sopot	
Javelin throw	44.62 m	E Dubowska	Norway (NOR)	1997 Lublin	
Ball throw	14.68 m	M Godzik	Belarus (BLR)	1997 Lublin	
4 × 100 m relay	56.13	Team Moldova	Moldova (MOL)	2001 Sopot	
4 × 400 m relay	4:40.13	Team Belarus	Belarus (BLR)	2003 Poznań	

== Swimming ==
=== Men ===
Event	Time	Name	Nation	Games	Ref
50m freestyle	24.44	Justin Kiedrzyn	Canada (CAN)	2013 Kielce	
100m freestyle	53.28	T Wolinski	United States (USA)	2011 Silesia	
200m freestyle	1:57.78	Justin Kiedrzyn	Canada (CAN)	2013 Kielce	
400m freestyle	4:53.60	L Smelik	Czechoslovakia (TCH)	1997 Kraków	
1500m freestyle	24:26.20	Rogalski	Canada (CAN)	1934 Warsaw	
50m backstroke	26.68	David Nowicki	Canada (CAN)	2009 Toruń	
100m backstroke	1:01.96	David Nowicki	Canada (CAN)	2009 Toruń	
200m backstroke	2:44.29	M Blasiak	France (FRA)	2005 Warsaw	
50m breaststroke	31.06	David Nowicki	Canada (CAN)	2009 Toruń	
100m breaststroke	1:07.28	David Nowicki	Canada (CAN)	2009 Toruń	
200m breaststroke	2:52.62	M Blasiak	France (FRA)	2005 Warsaw	
50m butterfly	25.97	Justin Kiedrzyn	Canada (CAN)	2013 Kielce	
100m butterfly	1:18.70	F Mielcarek	France (FRA)	1977 Kraków	
100m individual medley	1:01.23	Justin Kiedrzyn	Canada (CAN)	2013 Kielce	
200m individual medley	2:45.70	F Mielcarek	France (FRA)	1977 Kraków	
400m individual medley	5:22.90	M Blasiak	France (FRA)	2005 Warsaw	
4 x 50m freestyle relay	1:46.91	Justin Kiedrzyn Jakob Josef Piekarski Mackenzie Smith Marek Ruta	Canada (CAN)	2013 Kielce	
4 × 100 m freestyle relay	5:43.00	Team Romania	Romania (ROM)	1934 Warsaw	
4 × 50 m medley relay	1:56.65	Jakob Josef Piekarski Mackenzie Smith Justin Kiedrzyn Marek Ruta	Canada (CAN)	2013 Kielce	

=== Women ===
Event	Time	Name	Nation	Games	Ref
50m freestyle	27.95	Ola Jóźwiak	Canada (CAN)	2013 Kielce	
100m freestyle	1:00.95	Ola Jóźwiak	Canada (CAN)	2013 Kielce	
200m freestyle	2:13.49	Zosia Niemczak	United States (USA)	2013 Kielce	
50m backstroke	32.00	Zosia Niemczak	United States (USA)	2013 Kielce	
100m backstroke	1:11.07	M Neary	Canada (CAN)	2005 Warsaw	
200m backstroke	2:27.04	M Neary	Canada (CAN)	2005 Warsaw	
50m breaststroke	36.41	Irina Comarovschi	Moldova (MOL)	2019 Gdynia	
100m breaststroke	1:20.61	Irina Comarovschi	Moldova (MOL)	2019 Gdynia	
200m breaststroke	3:13.55	J Majewski	Germany (GER)	2005 Warsaw	
50m butterfly	30.54	K Siuda	Canada (CAN)	2009 Toruń	
100m butterfly	1:11.60	Irène Debrunner	Switzerland (SUI)	1974 Kraków	
100m individual medley	1:12.22	Zosia Niemczak	United States (USA)	2013 Kielce	
200m individual medley	3:06.80	P Wataszczyk	Czechoslovakia (TCH)	1974 Kraków	
400m individual medley	5:50.77	M Neary	Canada (CAN)	2005 Warsaw	
4 x 50m freestyle relay	2:08.58	Ola Jóźwiak Karolina Konior Michelle Gajewski Marcelina Pitula	Canada (CAN)	2013 Kielce	
4 × 50m medley relay	2:21.87	Maya Filon Olivia Borawski Zofia Niemczak Isabella Lovasz	United States (USA)	2013 Kielce	

== See also ==
- World Polonia Games
