= Płażyński =

Płażyński is a surname of Polish origin. Notable people with the surname include:

- Kacper Płażyński (born 1989), Polish lawyer and politician
- Maciej Płażyński (1958-2010), Polish politician
