= Alf Seccombe =

American film director

Alfred Seccombe (also credited as Alf Seccombe) (born December 8, 1982) is an American film director, actor, and film festival director. He grew up in Carmel Valley, California and started making films in high school with Conall Jones.

He was the Director of Programming for the Palo Alto International Film Festival in 2011 and 2012.

== Short films ==
Alf Seccombe's first notable film, Ringo, opened the inaugural Tiger Cub Competition at International Film Festival Rotterdam. His film Young Dracula came in second in the Bay Area Short category at the 54th San Francisco International Film Festival.
