= Agnieszka Pomaska =

Polish politician (born 1980)

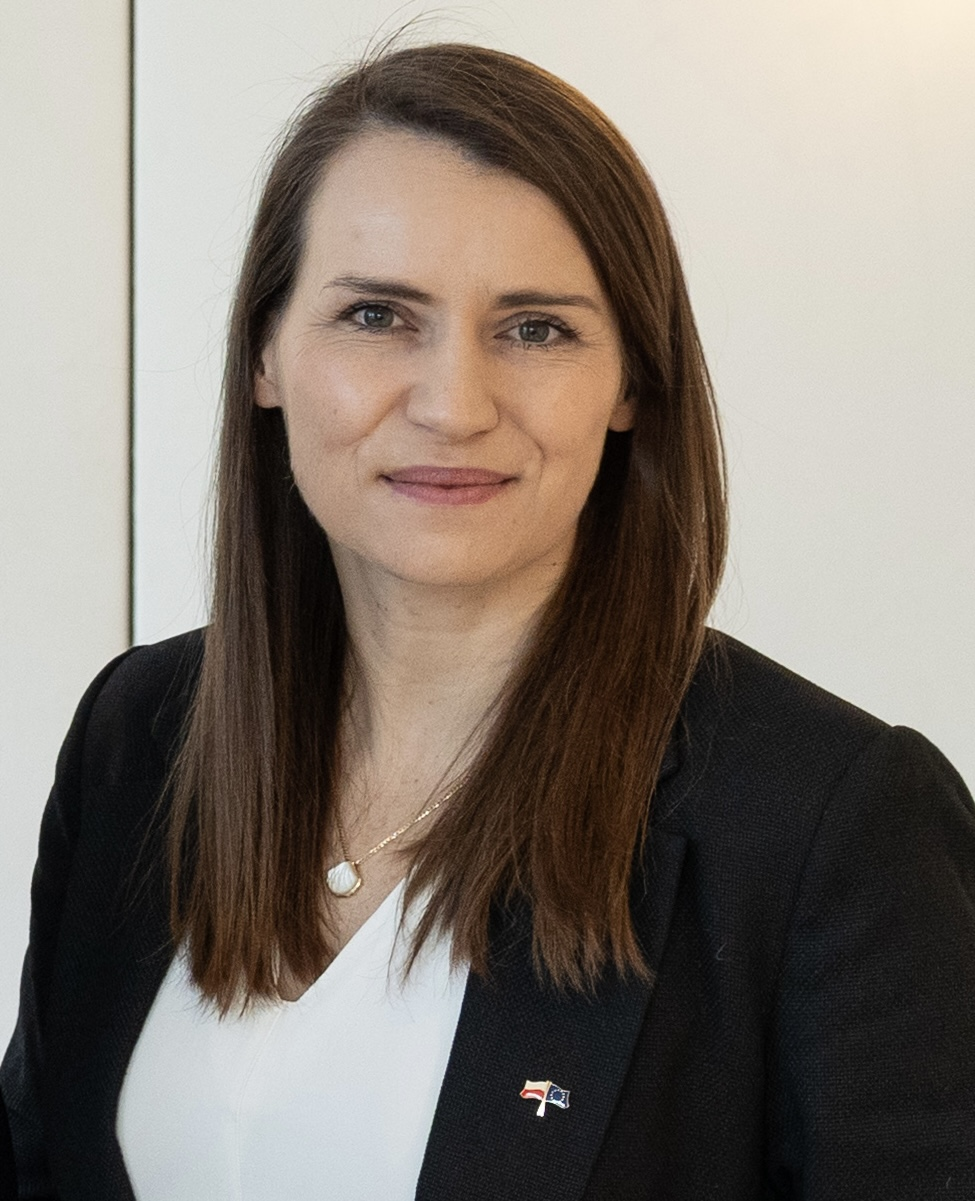
- Pomaska in 2025

Member of the Sejm
- Incumbent
- Assumed office 24 June 2009
- Constituency: Gdańsk

Vice-President of the Parliamentary Assembly of the Council of Europe
- In office 22 January 2024 – 25 January 2026

Personal details
- Born: Agnieszka Dominika Pomaska; 8 January 1980 (age 46) Gdynia, Poland
- Party: Civic Coalition (since 2025); Civic Platform (2001–2025)
- Education: University of Gdańsk
- Website: www.pomaska.pl

Agnieszka Dominika Pomaska (Polish: [aɡˈniɛszka-pɔˈmaska]; born 8 January 1980) is a Polish politician and former competitive sailor who has served as a member of the Sejm since 2009. A member of Civic Coalition, she represents the Gdańsk constituency and has chaired the Sejm's European Union Affairs Committee since 2024. She was a vice-president of the Parliamentary Assembly of the Council of Europe (PACE) from 2024 to 2026.

== Early life and education ==
Pomaska was born in Gdynia and grew up in the Tricity. She competed in sailing for YKP Gdynia and later for the Sopot Sailing Club. She won the Polish championship in the Optimist class in 1994, placed third at the junior world championship in the Mistral class in 1998, and won the Polish freestyle windsurfing championship in 2000.

In 2005, she graduated from the University of Gdańsk with a master's degree in political science.

== Political career ==
=== Local government ===
In 2001, Pomaska joined the Gdańsk board of the Young Democrats Association, the youth organisation associated with Civic Platform. She was elected to the Gdańsk City Council in 2002 and re-elected in 2006. From 2006 until leaving the council in June 2009, she served as its vice-chair and chaired its Tourism and City Promotion Committee.

=== Sejm ===
Pomaska contested the 2007 Polish parliamentary election in the Gdańsk constituency, receiving 9,495 votes but not initially winning a seat. On 24 June 2009, she entered the Sejm after Jarosław Wałęsa was elected to the European Parliament, and resigned from the Gdańsk City Council the previous day.

In 2010, she became chair of Civic Platform's Gdańsk organisation, a position she held until 2021. She was re-elected to the Sejm in the 2011 Polish parliamentary election with 16,117 votes and chaired the European Union Affairs Committee during the seventh term.

In 2015, Pomaska became a vice-chair of Civic Platform in the Pomeranian Voivodeship. In May of that year, Russia included her on a list of European politicians and officials barred from entering the country. She won re-election in the 2015 Polish parliamentary election with 22,196 votes and served as a vice-chair of the European Union Affairs Committee during the eighth term. In December 2017, she joined Civic Platform's national board.

Pomaska was re-elected on the Civic Coalition list in the 2019 Polish parliamentary election, receiving 39,103 votes. During the ninth term, she again served as a vice-chair of the European Union Affairs Committee. In 2021, she stood for chair of Civic Platform in the Pomeranian Voivodeship but lost to Mieczysław Struk.

In 2022, she became chair of the citizens' legislative committee Tak dla In Vitro ("Yes for IVF"), which campaigned to restore public funding for in vitro fertilisation and collected nearly 500,000 signatures for its bill. The measure was enacted in December 2023.

In the 2023 Polish parliamentary election, Pomaska won a fifth consecutive term, receiving 83,590 votes. At the beginning of the tenth term, she served as a vice-chair of the European Union Affairs Committee and as a member of the Foreign Affairs Committee. In 2024, she became chair of the European Union Affairs Committee.

=== European activities ===
Pomaska served as a Polish representative to PACE from January 2016 to January 2020. In 2022, she was elected a vice-president of EPP Women, the women's organisation of the European People's Party. She was re-elected for the 2025–2028 term.

She returned to PACE in January 2024 as chair of the Polish parliamentary delegation and served as a vice-president of the Assembly until January 2026. She became treasurer of the Assembly's Group of the European People's Party in October 2024 and second vice-chair of the Committee on Culture, Science, Education and Media in January 2026.
