= Sejm Constituency no. 25 =

Parliamentary constituency in Poland

Coordinates: 54°22′00″N 18°38′00″E

Sejm Constituency no. 25 Gdańsk
- Okręg wyborczy nr 25; Gdańsk
- Constituency for the Sejm
- Location within Poland.
- Counties: Gdańsk (city county), Gdańsk (land county), Kwidzyn, Malbork, Nowy Dwór, Starogard, Sopot, Sztum, Tczew
- Voivodeship: Pomeranian
- Population: 1,099,937 (June 2023)
- Electorate: 827,151 (2023)
- Area: 6,520.95 km^{2} (2,517.75 sq mi)

Current constituency
- Created: 2001
- Deputies: 12
- Regional assembly: Pomeranian Voivodeship Sejmik
- Senate constituencies: 65, 66 and 67
- EP constituency: Pomeranian

Sejm Constituency no. 25 (Polish: Okręg wyborczy nr 25) is a constituency of the Sejm electing twelve deputies. It consists of city counties of Gdańsk and Sopot, and land counties of Gdańsk, Kwidzyn, Malbork, Nowy Dwór, Starogard, Sztum, Tczew. Constituency Electoral Commission's seat is the city of Gdańsk.

== List of deputies ==
Deputies for the 10th Sejm (2023–2027)
Deputy	Party	Parliamentary group
Patryk Gabriel	Civic Platform	Civic Coalition
Magdalena Kołodziejczak	Civic Platform	Civic Coalition
Agnieszka Pomaska	Civic Platform	Civic Coalition
Jarosław Wałęsa	Civic Platform	Civic Coalition
Piotr Adamowicz	Independent	Civic Coalition
Jacek Karnowski	Yes! For Poland	Civic Coalition
Kacper Płażyński	Law and Justice	Law and Justice
Jarosław Sellin	Law and Justice	Law and Justice
Kazimierz Smoliński	Law and Justice	Law and Justice
Magdalena Sroka	Polish People's Party	Polish People's Party
Agnieszka Buczyńska	Poland 2050	Poland 2050
Katarzyna Kotula	New Left	The Left

== Election results ==
=== 2001 ===
2001 parliamentary election: Gdańsk
Party	Votes	%	Seats
Democratic Left Alliance – Labour Union	125,093	34.58	5
Civic Platform	93,408	25.82	3
Law and Justice	57,710	15.95	2
Self-Defence of the Republic of Poland	23,085	6.38	1
League of Polish Families	21,361	5.90	1
Solidarity of the Right Electoral Action	17,752	4.91	–
Polish People's Party	12,263	3.39	–
Freedom Union	10,239	2.83	–
Social Alternative Movement	836	0.23	–
Total	361,747	100.00	12
Valid votes	361,747	96.52	
Invalid/blank votes	13,036	3.48	
Total votes	374,783	100.00	
Registered voters/turnout	789,720	47.46	
Source: National Electoral Commission

=== 2005 ===
2005 parliamentary election: Gdańsk
Party	Votes	%	Seats
Civic Platform	138,989	39.90	6
Law and Justice	89,715	25.75	4
Democratic Left Alliance	31,508	9.04	1
Self-Defence of the Republic of Poland	23,429	6.73	1
League of Polish Families	19,534	5.61	–
Social Democracy of Poland	13,429	3.85	–
Polish People's Party	9,493	2.73	–
Democratic Party – demokraci.pl	7,663	2.20	–
Janusz Korwin-Mikke Platform	4,998	1.43	–
Patriotic Movement	2,463	0.71	–
Polish Labour Party	2,270	0.65	–
Ancestral Home	1,941	0.56	–
Center	1,262	0.36	–
Polish National Party	863	0.25	–
All-Poland Civic Coalition	802	0.23	–
Total	348,359	100.00	12
Valid votes	348,359	97.33	
Invalid/blank votes	9,569	2.67	
Total votes	357,928	100.00	
Registered voters/turnout	814,600	43.94	
Source: National Electoral Commission

=== 2007 ===
2007 parliamentary election: Gdańsk
Party	Votes	%	Seats
Civic Platform	258,073	54.62	8
Law and Justice	127,959	27.08	3
Left and Democrats	50,019	10.59	1
Polish People's Party	20,676	4.38	–
League of Polish Families	6,351	1.34	–
Self-Defence of the Republic of Poland	5,622	1.19	–
Polish Labour Party	3,804	0.81	–
Total	472,504	100.00	12
Valid votes	472,504	98.43	
Invalid/blank votes	7,542	1.57	
Total votes	480,046	100.00	
Registered voters/turnout	823,742	58.28	
Source: National Electoral Commission

=== 2011 ===
2011 parliamentary election: Gdańsk
Party	Votes	%	Seats
Civic Platform	219,106	52.76	8
Law and Justice	102,131	24.59	3
Palikot's Movement	37,615	9.06	1
Democratic Left Alliance	25,542	6.15	–
Polish People's Party	19,313	4.65	–
Poland Comes First	8,584	2.07	–
Polish Labour Party - August 80	2,009	0.48	–
Poland Our Home – Andrzej Lepper's Self-Defence	1,026	0.25	–
Total	415,326	100.00	12
Valid votes	415,326	95.78	
Invalid/blank votes	18,311	4.22	
Total votes	433,637	100.00	
Registered voters/turnout	829,936	52.25	
Source: National Electoral Commission

=== 2015 ===
2015 parliamentary election: Gdańsk
Party	Votes	%	Seats
Civic Platform	148,305	34.72	5
Law and Justice	126,466	29.61	5
Modern	39,184	9.17	1
Kukiz'15	30,536	7.15	1
United Left	28,168	6.59	–
KORWiN	21,366	5.00	–
Together	16,992	3.98	–
Polish People's Party	12,904	3.02	–
Zbigniew Stonoga's party	3,210	0.75	–
Total	427,131	100.00	12
Valid votes	427,131	97.83	
Invalid/blank votes	9,494	2.17	
Total votes	436,625	100.00	
Registered voters/turnout	830,798	52.55	
Source: National Electoral Commission

=== 2019 ===
2019 parliamentary election: Gdańsk
Party	Votes	%	Seats
Civic Coalition	218,484	41.31	6
Law and Justice	169,753	32.10	4
The Left	71,236	13.47	1
Confederation	38,153	7.21	1
Polish People's Party	31,203	5.90	–
Total	528,829	100.00	12
Valid votes	528,829	99.03	
Invalid/blank votes	5,196	0.97	
Total votes	534,025	100.00	
Registered voters/turnout	831,651	64.21	
Source: National Electoral Commission

=== 2023 ===
2023 parliamentary election: Gdańsk
Electoral committee	Votes	%	Seats
Civic Coalition	257,009	41.70	6
Law and Justice	155,318	25.20	3
Third Way	90,599	14.70	2
The Left	57,967	9.41	1
Confederation	38,406	6.23	–
Nonpartisan Local Government Activists	8,871	1.44	–
There is One Poland	8,117	1.32	–
Total	616,287	100.00	12
Valid votes	616,287	98.35	
Invalid/blank votes	10,339	1.65	
Total votes	626,626	100.00	
Registered voters/turnout	827,151	75.76	
Source: National Electoral Commission
