= Młynary =

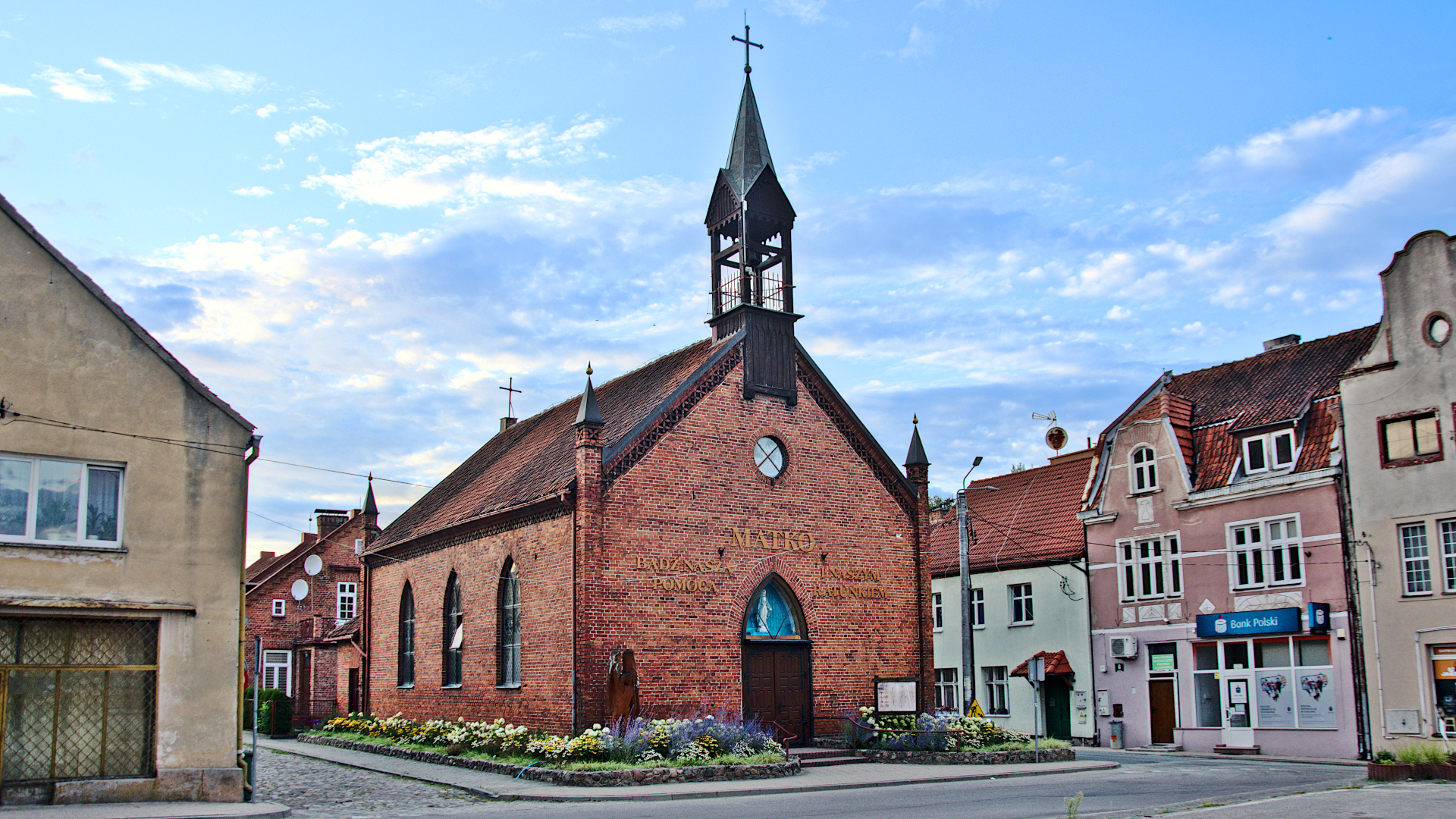
- Immaculate Conception church in Młynary

- Flag Coat of arms

- Location within Poland
- Coordinates: 54°11′14″N 19°43′45″E
- Country: Poland
- Voivodeship: Warmian-Masurian
- County: Elbląg
- Gmina: Młynary
- Established: 14th century

Area
  - Total: 2.76 km^{2} (1.07 sq mi)
- Elevation: 53 m (174 ft)

Population (2018)
  - Total: 1,782
  - Density: 646/km^{2} (1,670/sq mi)
- Time zone: UTC+1 (CET)
  - Summer (DST): UTC+2 (CEST)
- Postal code: 14-420
- Vehicle registration: NEB
- Website: www.mlynary.pl

Młynary [mwɨˈnarɨ] (German: Mühlhausen in Ostpreußen) is a town in northern Poland, in Elbląg County, Warmian-Masurian Voivodeship, with 1,782 inhabitants (2018). This makes it the smallest of the 49 towns in the voivodeship.

== Etymology ==
Historic Polish names of the town, other than Młynary, were also Młyny and Miluza.

== History ==
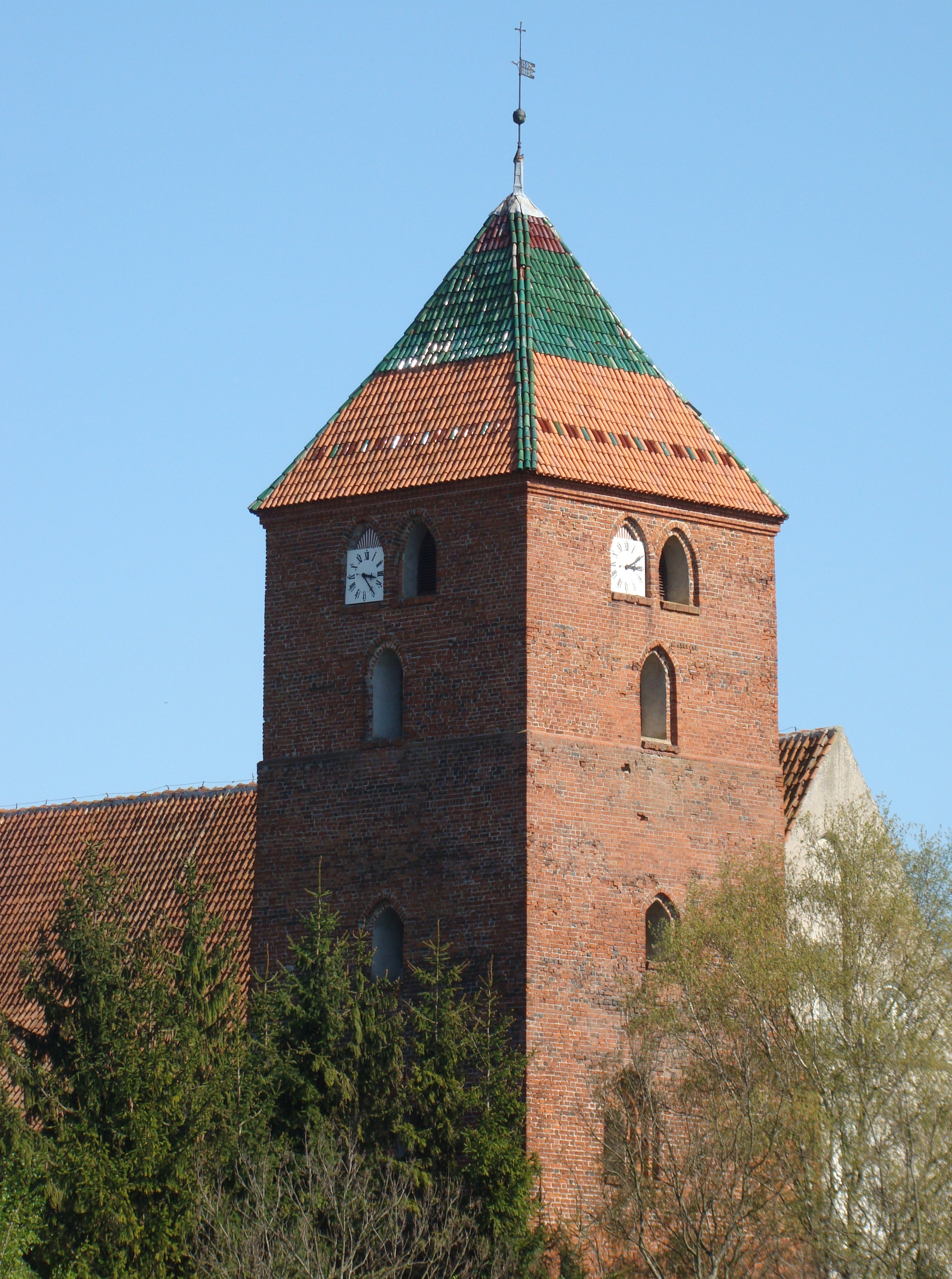
Gothic Saint Peter's church

The town was founded in the 14th century. A document from 1338 specifies the rules of judicial settlement of potential disputes between people of the town's three main ethnic groups: Poles, Old Prussians and Germans.

In 1440, the town joined the anti-Teutonic Prussian Confederation, at the request of which King Casimir IV Jagiellon signed the act of incorporation of the region to the Kingdom of Poland in 1454, an event that sparked the Thirteen Years’ War (1454–1466). In 1455 the town was briefly captured by the Teutonic Knights and the town's mayor was drowned by them in retaliation. After the peace treaty signed in Toruń in 1466, the town became a part of Poland as a fief held by the Teutonic Knights.

In 1628 the town was captured and occupied by the Swedes. From 1772, it formed part of the newly established province of East Prussia within the Kingdom of Prussia. In 1773, a year after the First Partition of Poland, the 52nd Fusilier Regiment of Prussia was located in the town. During the Napoleonic Wars, in 1807 French troops entered the town and stayed over a year. In November 1831, several Polish infantry units and honor guards of the November Uprising stopped near the town on the way to their internment places. From 1871 the town formed part of the German Empire. After World War II the region was claimed part of Poland and was preliminarily assigned to Poland by the Potsdam Agreement under territorial changes demanded by the Soviet Union.

== Transport ==
Młynary is located at the intersection of the Voivodeship roads 505 and 509, and the Polish Expressway S22 runs nearby, northwest of the town.

== Sports ==
The local football club is Syrena Młynary. It competes in the lower leagues.

== Notable people ==
- Maciej Płażyński, Polish politician
