= Rita of the West =

1967 film

- Directed by: Ferdinando Baldi
- Screenplay by: Franco Rossetti; Ferdinando Baldi
- Story by: Ferdinando Baldi
- Produced by: Manolo Bolognini
- Starring: Rita Pavone; Terence Hill; Lucio Dalla; Teddy Reno
- Cinematography: Enzo Barboni
- Edited by: Nino Baragli
- Music by: Robby Poitevin
- Production company: B.R.C. Produzione Film
- Distributed by: Euro International Film
- Release date: 1967
- Country: Italy
- Language: Italian

Rita of the West (Italian: Little Rita nel West, also known as Crazy Westerners), is a 1967 Italian "musicarello"-Spaghetti Western film directed by Ferdinando Baldi.

== Plot ==
Little Rita is a traveling fun fighter, the "bestest in the West", who is helping the Native American chief Silly Bull with his goal to gather and destroy the white man's gold, which has ruined the world. To do this she has run-ins with parodies of popular western characters, including Django and Ringo. She is captured by Mexican bandit Sancho and his men, who want the secret to where the gold is being hidden (in a cave near the Native American village). Though she refuses to talk, she is rescued by Black Star, a cowboy from "far away", who saw her get kidnapped. She takes him with her back to Silly Bull, but after she realizes she's in love with him, Black Star tries to steal the gold from the cave. Silly Bull turns him over to the "white man's" court, where he pleads guilty and is sentenced to death. He's extradited to the Native Americans to punish, but Rita talks Silly Bull into sparing him. He heads back to town where, after killing Sancho to prevent him robbing the bank, he makes the sheriff arrest him and pushes them to execute him because, though Silly Bull refused to do it, the sentence still stands. A native American overhears and goes back to the village where Rita and the others are getting ready to blow up the gold that evening. When she hears about Black Star, she heads back to the town and tries to get the sheriff to release Star. He refuses, but Star overhears her and comes out, since his cell is not locked. He agrees not to be hanged, and tells Rita he loves her. That night, they blow up the gold and have a party in town, during which Rita departs for "far away", and Star follows.

== Cast ==
- Rita Pavone as Little Rita
- Terence Hill as Black Star / Black Stan
- Lucio Dalla as Francis Fitzgerald Grawz
- Teddy Reno as Sheriff Teno
- Kirk Morris as Ringo
- Gordon Mitchell as Bisonte Seduto / Sitting Bison / Silly Bull
- Fernando Sancho as Sancho
- Pinuccio Ardia as Barman
- Livio Lorenzon as Dying Man
- Nini Rosso as Mexican Trumpet Player
- Gino Pernice asTribunal President Joseph
