= Rian Johnson =

American filmmaker (born 1973)

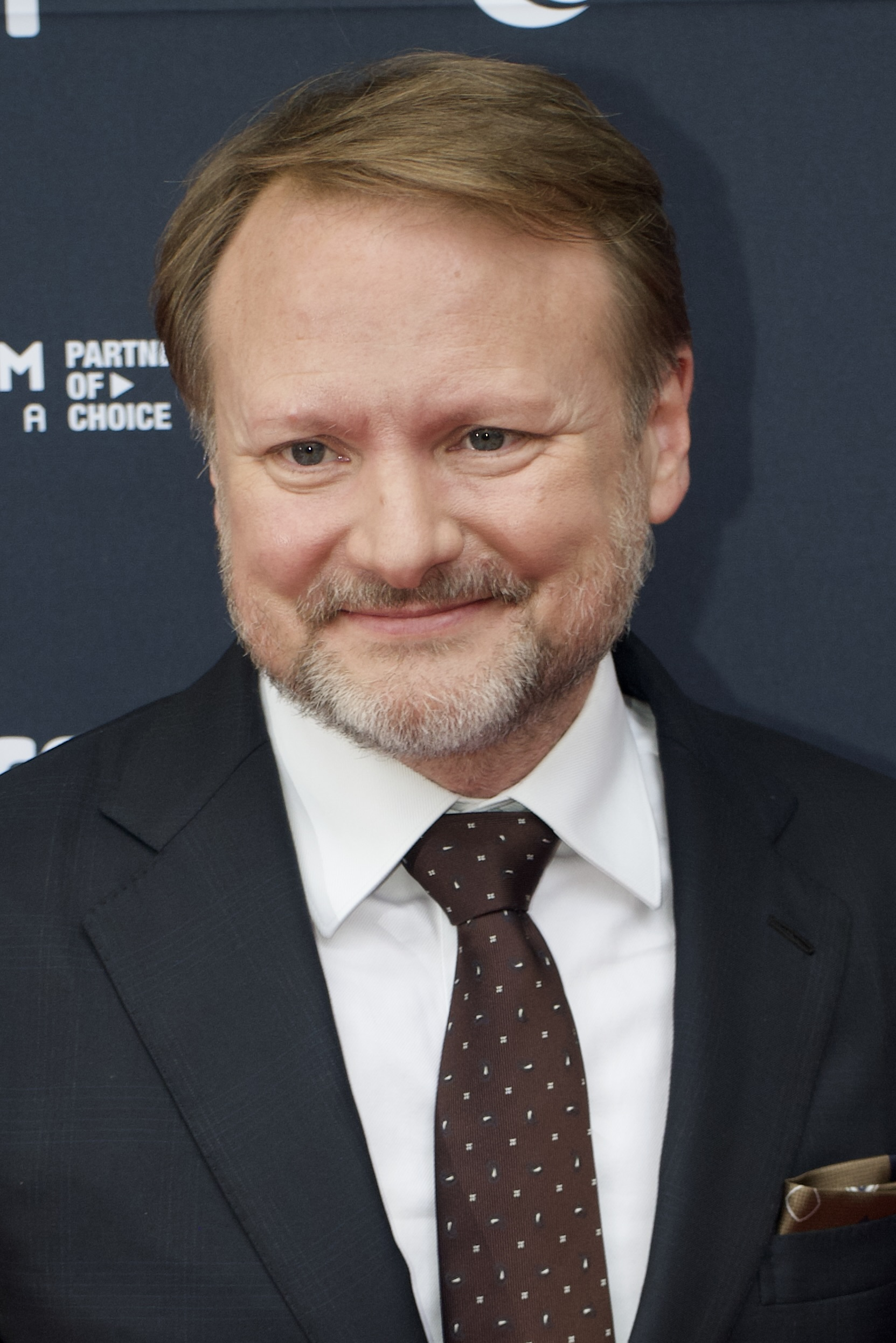
- Johnson at the 2025 Toronto International Film Festival
- Born: Rian Craig Johnson; December 17, 1973 (age 52); Silver Spring, Maryland, U.S.
- Education: University of Southern California
- Occupations: Director; producer; writer
- Years active: 1990–present
- Known for: Brick (2005); Looper (2012); Star Wars: The Last Jedi (2017); Knives Out trilogy (2019–2025); Poker Face (2023–2025)
- Spouse: Karina Longworth (m. 2018)
- Relatives: Nathan Johnson (cousin)

Rian Craig Johnson (born December 17, 1973) is an American filmmaker. He made his directorial debut with the neo-noir mystery film Brick (2005), which received positive reviews and grossed nearly $4 million on a $450,000 budget. Going on to make higher-profile films, Johnson achieved mainstream recognition for writing and directing the science-fiction thriller Looper (2012) to critical and commercial success. Johnson landed his largest project when he wrote and directed the space opera Star Wars: The Last Jedi (2017), which grossed over $1 billion. He returned to the mystery genre with the Knives Out film series (2019–present), which earned him Academy Award nominations for Best Original Screenplay and Best Adapted Screenplay.

Additionally, Johnson is known for directing three highly acclaimed episodes for the television series Breaking Bad (2008–2013), namely "Ozymandias", "Fly", and "Fifty-One"; for the last, he received the Directors Guild of America Award for Outstanding Directing – Drama Series in 2013. He created the murder mystery series Poker Face for Peacock starring Natasha Lyonne. Johnson is known for his longstanding collaboration with actor Joseph Gordon-Levitt, who has appeared in all of his feature films to date in varying capacity. He was named one of the 100 most influential people in the world by Time magazine in 2023.

== Early life ==
Johnson was born on December 17, 1973, in Silver Spring, Maryland. He grew up in Denver, Colorado, until sixth grade, when he moved to San Clemente, California. He attended San Clemente High School (graduating in 1992), where Brick was predominantly filmed. He attended the University of Southern California and graduated from the USC School of Cinematic Arts in 1996. Johnson's second short film, Evil Demon Golfball from Hell!!!, loosely based on Edgar Allan Poe's "The Tell-Tale Heart", was included as an easter egg on the Looper Blu-ray.

== Career ==
Johnson has said he was inspired to become a film director after seeing Woody Allen's 1977 film Annie Hall. "It moved me in a way that very few other films have moved me. That's something that, I pray to God, if I am able to keep making movies, I can only hope, twenty years down the line maybe, I'll be able to approach."

=== Early films and Breaking Bad ===
Johnson's debut feature film, Brick, is a crime drama released in 2005 and made for just under $500,000. Johnson has said he looked to Dashiell Hammett's novels as inspiration for the film's unique use of language. While the film is classified as a film noir, Johnson claims that no references were made to film noir during production, so as to focus the production away from reproducing a genre piece. Brick was released on DVD by Focus Features.

Johnson directed the video for the Mountain Goats' song "Woke Up New" in 2006. He is a professed fan of the band and was asked to direct the video when bandleader John Darnielle noticed a reference to them in the credits for Brick. A song is credited to "The Hospital Bombers Experience", which is a reference to the Mountain Goats song titled "The Best Ever Death Metal Band in Denton". Johnson also directed a live performance film of the Mountain Goats' 2009 album The Life of the World to Come. The film consists of a single shot, depicting Darnielle performing the entire album on guitar and piano with minimal accompaniment. This film was screened in New York City, Chicago, Seattle, and Portland, Oregon upon its completion, and was released as a limited edition DVD on Record Store Day (April 17, 2010).

Johnson's second feature film, The Brothers Bloom, is a con-man story released in theaters in May 2009 to moderately positive critical reviews. On Metacritic, the film was assigned a weighted average score of 55 out of 100 based on 26 reviews from mainstream critics.

In March 2010, Johnson announced that he was directing an episode of the TV series Breaking Bad for its third season. The episode, "Fly", aired on May 23, 2010. Johnson directed a second episode of the show, "Fifty-One", which aired on August 5, 2012, and earned him a Directors Guild of America Award. He directed a third episode, "Ozymandias", which received high praise from critics, frequently cited as being 'one of the best television episodes' to air.

Johnson has made a number of short films, some of which are available on his website. His short film from high school, Ninja Ko, is available as an easter egg on the Brick DVD. After working with Joseph Gordon-Levitt on Brick, the two shot a short film in Paris titled Escargots. In 2002, he directed a short film, The Psychology of Dream Analysis, which is available to view on his Vimeo account. Johnson directed the episode "Manifest Destiny" of the TV series Terriers.

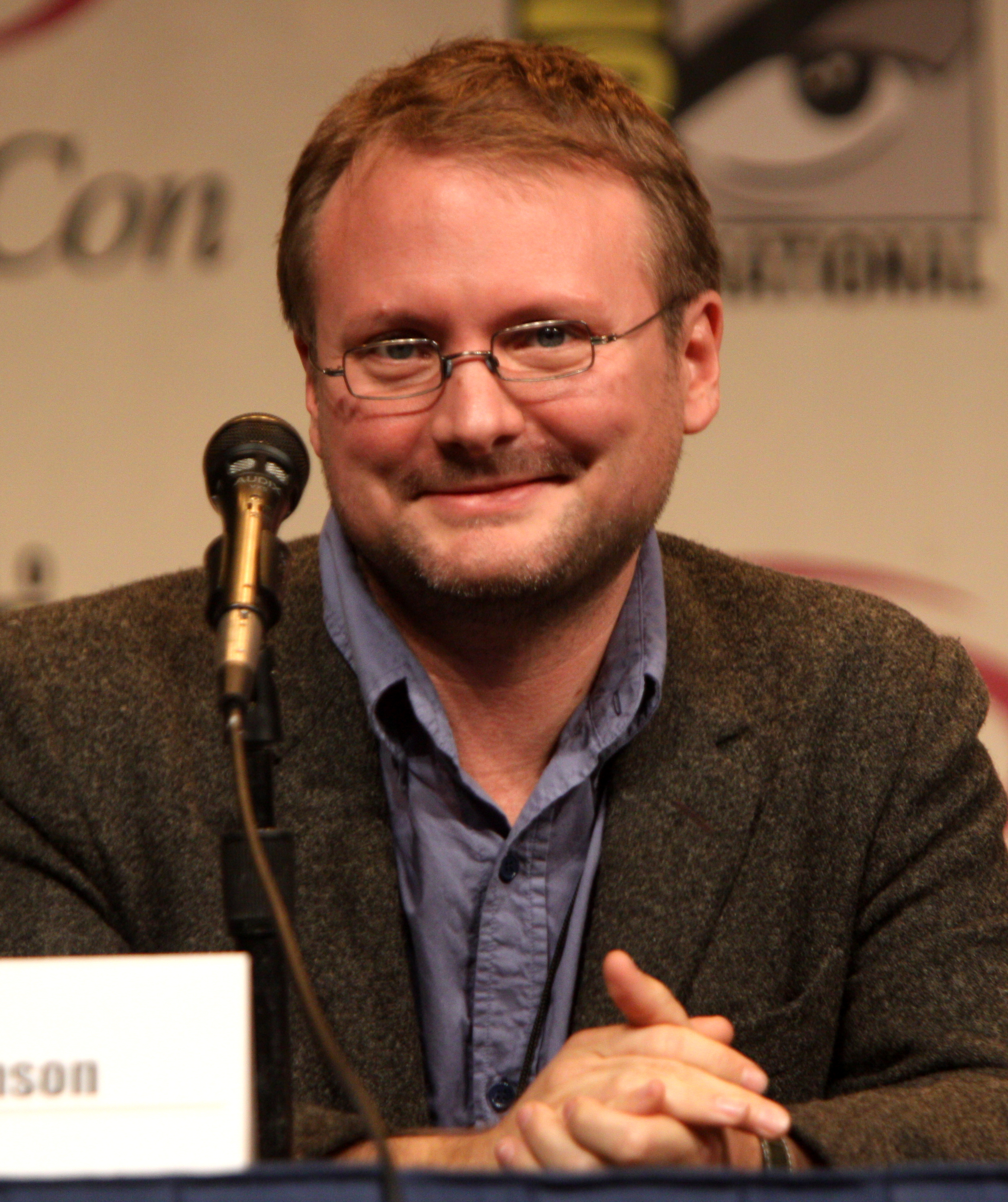
Johnson in 2012

Johnson's third feature film, Looper, began shooting in Louisiana on January 24, 2011, and was released on September 28, 2012, by TriStar Pictures and FilmDistrict. Set in the near future, it has been described as dark science fiction, and involves hitmen whose victims are sent from the future. The film opened the 2012 Toronto International Film Festival and the 2012 Palo Alto International Film Festival. Looper was a surprise success at the box office.

=== Star Wars: The Last Jedi ===
On June 20, 2014, news broke that Johnson would write and direct the eighth installment in the Star Wars film series. Johnson confirmed the report that following month. The film, Star Wars: The Last Jedi, was released on December 15, 2017, to positive reviews from critics and audiences. While multiple sources reported that Johnson turned down an offer from Lucasfilm to write and direct the film's follow-up, the then-untitled Episode IX, Johnson denied that he was ever in discussion for, or turned down, the role.

On November 9, 2017, it was announced that Johnson would write a new trilogy of Star Wars films, separate from the main story arc of previous films in the franchise, and would direct the first installment of his trilogy. By 2025, Johnson's plans for a Star Wars trilogy had not materialized and the project never got past the conceptual stage. But he did not rule out working with Lucasfilm in the future.

=== Knives Out and Poker Face ===
Following The Last Jedi, Johnson directed the murder mystery feature film Knives Out, starring Daniel Craig, Ana de Armas and Christopher Plummer. He penned the script and co-produced with longtime producing partner Ram Bergman. Knives Out was released on November 27, 2019, and was a major success with critics, as well as audiences, grossing over $300 million at the box office worldwide. It earned Johnson his first Academy Award nomination, for Best Original Screenplay.

In September 2019, Johnson and producer Ram Bergman launched T-Street, a company that will generate original content for film and TV shows. The venture is fully capitalized by global media company Valence Media. T-Street launched with a first look deal with Valence Media's Media Rights Capital for film and television projects. Valence Media holds a substantial minority equity stake in the company. Johnson and Bergman intend to make their own original creations through the company, and produce others.

In July 2020, Johnson directed a commercial for the augmented mobile video game Pokémon Go. In March 2021, it was announced that Johnson was writing/directing a ten-episode mystery drama television series for Peacock titled Poker Face, starring Natasha Lyonne, which premiered on the service on January 26, 2023. A second season premiered in May 2025.

Due to the success of Knives Out, Lionsgate announced that a sequel was officially approved in February 2020, with Johnson set to return to write and direct the film. That same month, it was reported that Netflix had obtained the rights to two sequels to Knives Out for around $450 million. Filming on the first Knives Out sequel, Glass Onion, began on June 28, 2021. After premiering at the 2022 Toronto International Film Festival, the film received a one-week theatrical release across the United States and in other international markets from November 23 to 29, 2022, before streaming on Netflix beginning on December 23. A third film in the series, Wake Up Dead Man, was released on Netflix in November 2025.

In March 2024, Johnson signed a deal with Warner Bros. to produce two films under his studio T-Street.

== Personal life ==
Johnson is a folk singer and banjo player. His brother is music producer Aaron Johnson. His cousin Nathan Johnson composed the scores for Brick, The Brothers Bloom, Looper, Knives Out, Glass Onion, and Wake Up Dead Man. Rian and Nathan make up a folk duo called the Preserves.

Johnson has been married to film writer, historian, and podcaster Karina Longworth since 2018. They met when she was working as a film critic.

His paternal grandfather is a Swedish immigrant who is in the homebuilding business.

== Filmography ==
=== Feature film ===
Year	Title	Director	Writer	Producer
2005	Brick (Note: Also credited as editor)	Yes	Yes	No
2008	The Brothers Bloom	Yes	Yes	No
2012	Looper	Yes	Yes	No
2017	Star Wars: The Last Jedi	Yes	Yes	No
2019	Knives Out	Yes	Yes	Yes
2022	Glass Onion	Yes	Yes	Yes
2025	Wake Up Dead Man	Yes	Yes	Yes

Producer only

- 2034 (TBA)

Executive producer

- Fair Play (2023)
- American Fiction (2023)

=== Short film ===
Year	Title	Director	Writer	Producer	Editor
1990	Ninja Ko, the Origami Master	Yes	Yes	Yes	Yes
1997	Evil Demon Golfball from Hell!!!	Yes	Yes	Yes	Yes
2001	Ben Boyer and the Phenomenology of Automobile Marketing	Yes	Yes	Yes	Yes
2002	The Psychology of Dream Analysis	Yes	Yes	Yes	Yes

=== Television ===
Year	Title	Director	Writer	Executive producer	Creator	Episode(s)
2010	Terriers	Yes	No	No	No	"Manifest Destiny"
2010-2013	Breaking Bad	Yes	No	No	No	directed 3 episodes
2014	HitRecord on TV	No	Yes	No	No	"RE: Trash"
2023-2025	Poker Face	Yes	Yes	Yes	Yes	directed 4 episodes, wrote 2 episodes
2024	3 Body Problem	No	No	Yes	No	

=== Other works ===
Documentary films

- The Mountain Goats: The Life of the World to Come (2010)

Music videos

Year	Title	Artist
2008	"Woke Up New"	The Mountain Goats
2018	"Oh Baby"	LCD Soundsystem

Commercials

Year	Title	Product	Ref.
2020	Look Closer	Pokémon Go Fest	

Acting roles

Year	Title	Role	Notes
2015	BoJack Horseman	Bryan (voice)	Episodes: "Yes, And" and "Out to Sea"
2016	Rogue One	Imperial Technician	Cameo role
2017	Star Wars: The Last Jedi	Luke Skywalker's Hand	Cameo; as Hand double

Technical credits

Year	Title	Role
1995	Omaha	Production Assistant
1997	Greater Than a Tiger	Editor
1998	Phyfutima	Camera Operator
2002	May	Editor

== Frequent collaborators ==
Individuals are actors unless marked otherwise.

Work Person	2005	2008	2012	2017	2019	2022	2023–2025	2025	—N/a
Work Person	Brick	The Brothers Bloom	Looper	Star Wars: The Last Jedi	Knives Out	Glass Onion	Poker Face	Wake Up Dead Man	Total
Joseph Gordon-Levitt	Yes	Yes	Yes	Yes	Yes	Yes	Yes	Yes	8
Nora Zehetner	Yes	Yes							2
Lukas Haas	Yes	Yes							2
Noah Segan	Yes	Yes	Yes	Yes	Yes	Yes	Yes	Yes	8
Andy Nyman		Yes		Yes					2
Adrien Brody		Yes					Yes		2
Frank Oz				Yes	Yes				2
Daniel Craig					Yes	Yes		Yes	3
K Callan					Yes		Yes		2
Natasha Lyonne						Yes	Yes		2
Ram Bergman (producer)	Yes	Yes	Yes	Yes	Yes	Yes	Yes	Yes	8
Steve Yedlin (cinematographer)	Yes	Yes	Yes	Yes	Yes	Yes	Yes	Yes	8
Bob Ducsay (editor)			Yes	Yes	Yes	Yes	Yes	Yes	6
Nathan Johnson (composer)	Yes	Yes	Yes		Yes	Yes	Yes	Yes	7

== Awards and nominations ==
Year	Work	Award	Result
2005	Brick	Sundance Film Festival Special Jury Prize for Originality of Vision	Won
2005	Brick	Sundance Film Festival Grand Jury Prize	Nominated
2006	Brick	Central Ohio Film Critics Association Award for Best Original Screenplay	Won
2006	Brick	Central Ohio Film Critics Association Award for Best Overlooked Film	Nominated
2006	Brick	Chicago Film Critics Association Award for Most Promising Director	Won
2006	Brick	Citizen Kane Award for Best Directorial Revelation	Won
2006	Brick	Deauville Film Festival Grand Special Prize	Won
2006	Brick	San Francisco Film Critics Circle Award for Best Original Screenplay	Nominated
2006	Brick	Online Film Critics Society Award for Best Breakthrough Filmmaker	Nominated
2006	Brick	Utah Film Critics Association Award for Best Original Screenplay	Won
2006	Brick	Toronto Film Critics Association Award for Best First Feature	Nominated
2006	Brick	Independent Spirit John Cassavetes Award	Nominated
2007	Brick	Austin Film Critics Association Award for Best First Film	Won
2007	Brick	Empire Award for Best Male Newcomer	Nominated
2008	The Brothers Bloom	Stockholm International Film Festival Bronze Horse	Nominated
2012	Looper	Austin Film Critics Association Award for Best Original Screenplay	Won
2012	Looper	Broadcast Film Critics Association Award for Best Screenplay	Nominated
2012	Looper	Chicago Film Critics Association Award for Best Original Screenplay	Nominated
2012	Looper	Florida Film Critics Circle Award for Best Original Screenplay	Won
2012	Looper	Houston Film Critics Society Award for Best Original Screenplay	Nominated
2012	Looper	Hugo Award for Best Dramatic Presentation (Long Form)	Nominated
2012	Looper	Las Vegas Film Critics Society Award for Best Screenplay	Won
2012	Looper	National Board of Review Award for Best Original Screenplay	Won
2012	Looper	Online Film Critics Society Award for Best Original Screenplay	Nominated
2012	Looper	Washington D.C. Area Film Critics Association Award for Best Original Screenplay	Won
2012	Looper	Utah Film Critics Association Award for Best Original Screenplay	Won
2013	Looper	Central Ohio Film Critics Association Award for Best Original Screenplay	Nominated
2013	Looper	North Carolina Film Critics Association Award for Best Original Screenplay	Won
2013	Looper	North Carolina Film Critics Association Award for Best Director	Nominated
2013	Looper	Ray Bradbury Award for Outstanding Dramatic Presentation	Nominated
2013	Looper	Writers Guild of America Award for Best Original Screenplay	Nominated
2013	Looper	Saturn Award for Best Director	Nominated
2013	Breaking Bad	Directors Guild of America Award for Outstanding Directing – Drama Series (Episode: "Fifty-One")	Won
2018	Star Wars: The Last Jedi	Empire Award for Best Director	Won
2018	Star Wars: The Last Jedi	Saturn Award for Best Director	Nominated
2018	Star Wars: The Last Jedi	Saturn Award for Best Writing	Won
2018	Star Wars: The Last Jedi	Hugo Award for Best Dramatic Presentation (Long Form)	Nominated
2018	Star Wars: The Last Jedi	Circuit Community Awards for Honorable Mentions	Won
2018	Star Wars: The Last Jedi	Denver Film Critics Society for Best Adapted Screenplay	Nominated
2018	Star Wars: The Last Jedi	Ray Bradbury Award for Outstanding Dramatic Presentation	Nominated
2019	Knives Out	Fantastic Fest Audience Award	Nominated
2019	Knives Out	Philadelphia Film Critics Circle Award for Best Film	Won
2019	Knives Out	Philadelphia Film Critics Circle Award for Best Screenplay	Won
2019	Knives Out	Washington DC Area Film Critics Association Award for Best Original Screenplay	Nominated
2019	Knives Out	San Diego Film Critics Society Award for Best Original Screenplay	Nominated
2019	Knives Out	Dublin Film Critics' Circle Award for Best Screenplay	Nominated
2019	Knives Out	Phoenix Critics Circle Award for Best Screenplay	Won
2019	Knives Out	Kansas City Film Critics Circle Award for Best Original Screenplay	Won
2019	Knives Out	Oklahoma Film Critics Circle Award for Best Original Screenplay	Won
2019	Knives Out	Seattle Film Critics Society Award for Best Screenplay	Nominated
2019	Knives Out	San Francisco Bay Area Film Critics Circle Award for Best Original Screenplay	Nominated
2019	Knives Out	Phoenix Film Critics Society Award for Best Original Screenplay	Won
2019	Knives Out	Satellite Award for Best Motion Picture – Comedy or Musical	Nominated
2019	Knives Out	Utah Film Critics Association Award for Best Original Screenplay	Nominated
2020	Knives Out	Central Ohio Film Critics Association Award for Best Original Screenplay	Nominated
2020	Knives Out	Chicago Film Critics Association Award for Best Original Screenplay	Nominated
2020	Knives Out	Houston Film Critics Society Award for Best Screenplay	Nominated
2020	Knives Out	North Carolina Film Critics Association Award for Best Original Screenplay	Nominated
2020	Knives Out	Chicago Independent Film Critics Circle Award for Best Studio Film	Won
2020	Knives Out	Chicago Independent Film Critics Circle Award for Best Original Screenplay	Won
2020	Knives Out	Golden Globe Award for Best Motion Picture – Musical or Comedy	Nominated
2020	Knives Out	Online Film Critics Society Award for Best Original Screenplay	Nominated
2020	Knives Out	Austin Film Critics Association Award for Best Original Screenplay	Nominated
2020	Knives Out	Hollywood Critics Association Award for Best Original Screenplay	Nominated
2020	Knives Out	Alliance of Women Film Journalists Award for Best Screenplay, Original	Nominated
2020	Knives Out	Critics' Choice Movie Award for Best Comedy	Nominated
2020	Knives Out	Critics' Choice Movie Award for Best Original Screenplay	Nominated
2020	Knives Out	Writers Guild of America Award for Best Original Screenplay	Nominated
2020	Knives Out	Academy Award for Best Original Screenplay	Nominated
2023	Glass Onion	Austin Film Critics Association Award for Best Adapted Screenplay	Won
2023	Glass Onion	Online Film Critics Society Award for Best Adapted Screenplay	Won
2023	Glass Onion	Washington D.C. Area Film Critics Association Award for Best Adapted Screenplay	Won
2023	Glass Onion	Capri Hollywood International Film Festival Award for Best Adapted Screenplay	Won
2023	Glass Onion	Critics' Choice Movie Award for Best Adapted Screenplay	Nominated
2023	Glass Onion	Golden Globe Award for Best Motion Picture – Musical or Comedy	Nominated
2023	Glass Onion	Writers Guild of America Award for Best Adapted Screenplay	Nominated
2023	Glass Onion	Academy Award for Best Adapted Screenplay	Nominated
2025	Wake Up Dead Man	Savannah Film Festival Award for Outstanding Achievement in Directing	Won
