= Young Dracula (film) =

2011 short horror film

- Directed by: Alf Seccombe
- Written by: Alf Seccombe
- Starring: Kyle Field
- Release date: 2011

Young Dracula is a 2011 short horror film written and directed by Alf Seccombe. The cast includes artist and musician Kyle Field of the band Little Wings, and American television news correspondent Su-chin Pak.

The film won Second Prize for Bay Area Shorts at the 54th San Francisco International Film Festival.
