= Ringo (sport) =

Net sport involving a rubber ring

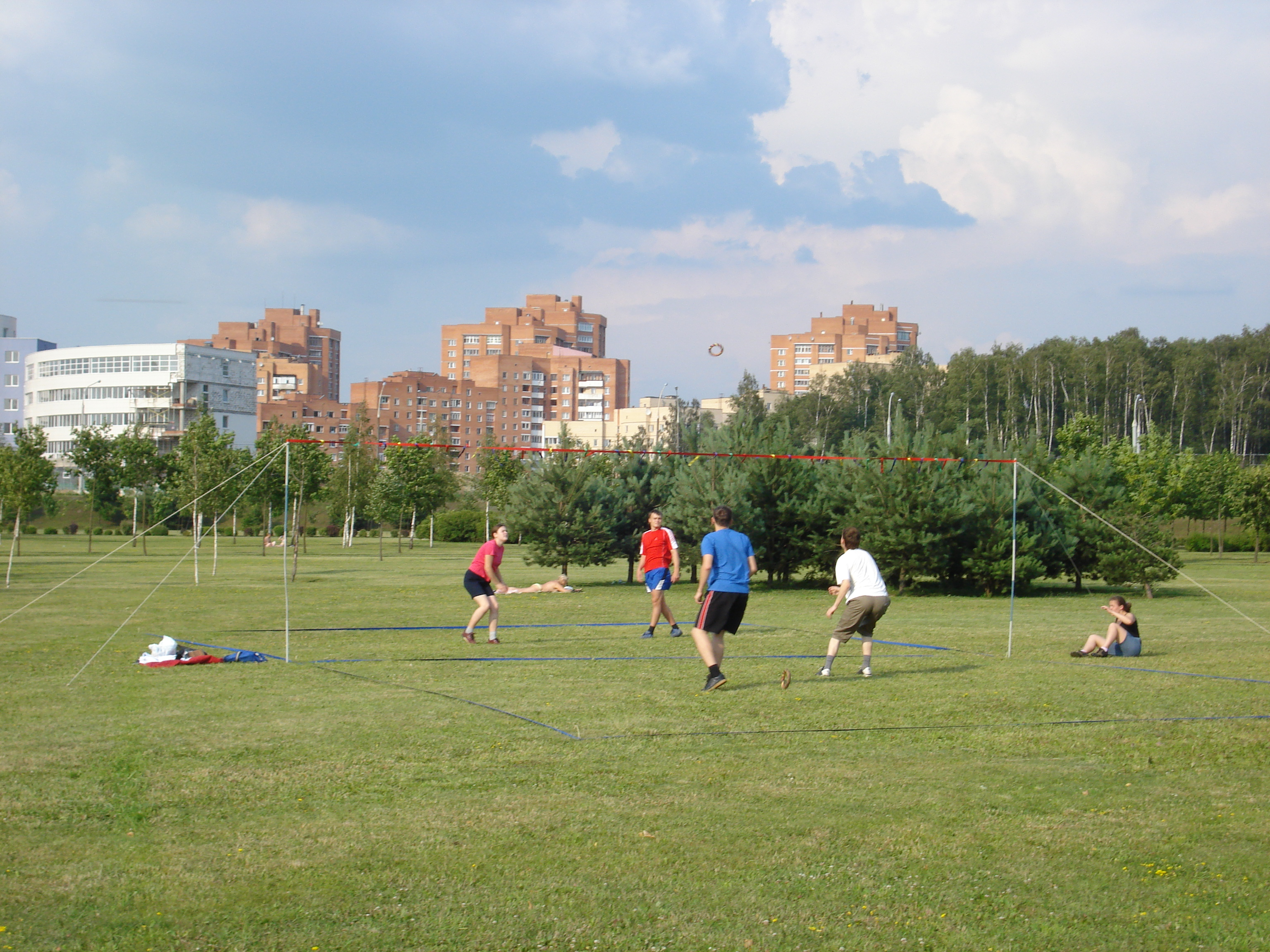
- Highest governing body: International Ringo Federation
- First played: 1959, Poland

Characteristics
- Contact: No
- Team members: Singles or doubles
- Mixed-sex: Yes, separate singles and doubles & mixed doubles
- Type: Sport
- Equipment: Rubber ring
- Venue: Indoor or outdoor court similar to that of volleyball

Presence
- Olympic: No
- Paralympic: No

Ringo is a net sport originating in Poland. Played between two teams (of one to three people) on a court whose size resembles that of volleyball, players throw a rubber ring attempting to land it in the other team's half-court.

The game is contested at regional and national competitions in Poland and by the Polish diaspora at the biennial Summer World Polonia Games.

== History ==
The game was invented in 1959 by Polish fencer and journalist Włodzimierz Strzyżewski. Ringo was introduced to the general public during the 1968 Summer Olympics. The first Polish championship was played in 1973. The Polish Ringo Federation was founded only in 1989 and an international federation four years later. While especially popular in Poland, Ringo is known throughout Europe and among the Polish diaspora.

== Court and equipment ==
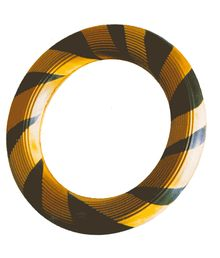
Ringo ring.

The field has a rectangular shape of 18 metres (59 ft) in length by 9 metres (30 ft) in width for teams of 2 and 3 players. The net is a string (at least 1 centimetre (0.39 in) wide) which hangs at a height of 243 centimetres (96 in). The dimensions of the court and the height of the net vary for the different age categories, as well as for individual games.

The ring is made of rubber, weighs between 160 and 165 grams (5.8 oz), and has a diameter of 17 centimetres (6.7 in).
