= Kacper Płażyński =

Polish lawyer and politician

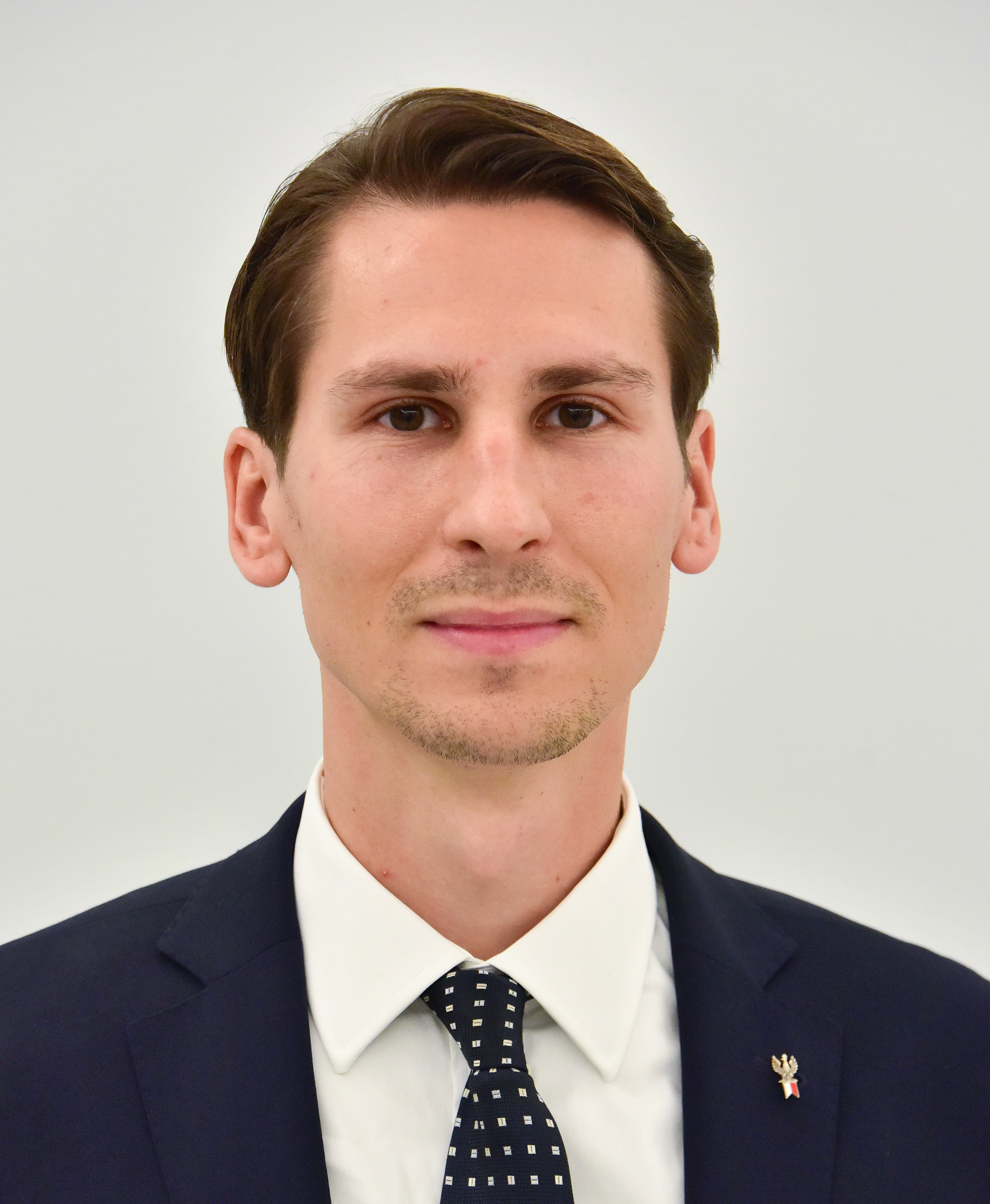

Member of the Sejm
- Incumbent
- Assumed office 12 November 2019
- Constituency: 25 - Gdańsk

Personal details
- Born: 10 May 1989 (age 37) Gdańsk, Poland
- Party: Law and Justice
- Spouse: Natalia Nitek-Płażyńska
- Children: 2 children
- Education: University of Gdańsk
- Profession: politician, lawyer

Kacper Maciej Płażyński (Polish pronunciation: [kat͡spɛr mat͡ɕɛj pwaʐɨj̃skʲi]; born 10 May 1989 in Gdańsk) is a Polish local government official and attorney, from 2018 to 2019 councilor of the city of Gdańsk, member of the Polish Lower House (Sejm) of the 9th and 10th term. He is the son of Maciej Płażyński.

== Biography ==
=== Education and professional work ===
Kacper Płażyński is a graduate of Cardinal Karol Wojtyła Primary School No. 74 in Gdańsk and Boleslaw I the Brave High School No. 2 in Sopot. He graduated with a master's degree in law from the Faculty of Law and Administration of the University of Gdańsk. For four years he cooperated with leading law firms in the Tri-City. In 2017, he became a manager at Energa, where he was responsible, among others, for developing a new corporate governance model for the Energa Group. He ran his own law firm in the city center of Gdańsk, specializing in civil and commercial matters.

=== Political career ===
After the parliamentary elections in 2015, Płażynski became a member of the Law and Justice party. He criticized the policy of the mayor of Gdańsk, Paweł Adamowicz, and proposed, among others, abolition of parking fees in the Brzeźno district. On 26 April 2018, PiS president Jarosław Kaczyński announced that Kacper Płażyński would be the party's candidate for the mayor of Gdańsk during the 2018 local elections. His election slogan was "Gdańsk of our dreams". In the second round of these elections, he lost to Paweł Adamowicz, gaining support of 35.2% (70,432 votes). In the same elections, he also ran for the City Council of Gdańsk, receiving 9,794 votes and the mandate of a councilor of the 8th term. He became a member of the Strategy and Budget and Spatial Development Committee of the Gdańsk City Council. In addition, he became the chairman of the Law and Justice councilors club in the City Council of Gdańsk.

In the parliamentary elections in 2019, he ran for the Polish Lower House (Sejm) in the Gdańsk constituency from second place on the Law and Justice list. He obtained a parliamentary mandate, receiving 89,384 votes. On 24 October 2019 Kazimierz Koralewski took over his duties as chairman of the Law and Justice councilors club in the City Council of Gdańsk. On 13 November 2019 Płażynski became a member of the European Union Affairs Committee, of which he has been the chairman since 2022, the Maritime Economy and Inland Navigation Committee (deputy chairman since 2021) and the Liaison with Poles Abroad Committee.

In 2019, Kacper Płażyński was a member of the Council of the European Solidarity Centre. In September 2019, he resigned from the ECS Council in opposition to the politicization of the celebrations of the anniversary of August 1980.

== Social activity ==
Kacper Płażyński has been socially active for many years. He belongs to several associations which, among other things, deal with cultivating the memory of the heroes of the anti-communist opposition of the "Dignity" Association. He is also the initiator of the establishment of the Social Committee "Gedania - STOP lawlessness in historic areas", whose goal is to restore the historic areas of the Gedania sports club to the inhabitants of Gdańsk, as a place of sports and a symbol of Poles' activities in the Free City of Gdańsk.

As part of pro bono legal assistance, he defends the weaker, e.g. represents the residents of a tenement house sold together with its tenants to a private investor, an unjustly dismissed employee of the Biedronka retail chain, drivers in the so-called the parking scandal.

== Private life ==
Płażyński is the son of the former Speaker of the Polish Lower House (Sejm) of the Republic of Poland, Maciej Płażyński, who died in the Smolensk crash in 2010, and Elżbieta Płażyńska who is a judge of the District Court in Gdańsk. He is also the great-grandson of Maksymilian Płażyński, captain of the 1st Cavalry Regiment of the Polish Legions of Marshal Józef Piłsudski. He has two siblings: Jakub (born in 1984) and Katarzyna (born in 1986).

He is married to Natalia Nitek-Plażyńska, whom he married in 2018 in St. Mary's Basilica. The couple has two children. He is a Catholic.

== Election results ==
Election	Election committee	Electoral authority	Constituency	Result
2018	Law and Justice	Mayor of Gdańsk	–	62 594 (29,68%)✗
2018	Law and Justice	Mayor of Gdańsk	–	70 432 (35,20%)✗
2018	Law and Justice	Gdańsk City Council	no. 2	9 794 (20,56%)✓
2019	Law and Justice	Sejm of the 9th term	no. 25	89 384 (16,90%)✓
2023	Law and Justice	Sejm of the 10th term	no. 25	100 445 (16,30%)✓
