= Nokia rinGo =

Mobile phones

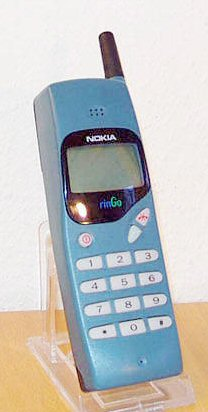
- The original rinGo
- Manufacturer: Nokia
- First released: 1995
- Compatible networks: NMT-900
- Form factor: Candybar
- Color: Blue/Red
- Dimensions: 152×55×33 mm (6.0×2.2×1.3 in), vol 160cc
- Weight: 235.00g (8.29 oz)
- Memory: 9-contact phone book
- Battery: 900 mAh, NiMH
- Display: monochrome LCD

The Nokia rinGo (named after "Ring and Go") is an entry-level analogue consumer mobile phone from Nokia, originally released for the analogue NMT-900 network in Finland, Norway, Sweden, Denmark and Netherlands. It was also sold in Thailand under the name Wave900. Three revisions were released afterwards.

== History ==
The first rinGo (code NHN-2NS/D/F (S-Sweden, D-Denmark, F-Finland)) phone was launched for NMT-900 in November 1995. It had a very simple design and came in light blue, yellow, red and royal blue with a small monochromatic LCD screen. The Nokia rinGo was designed to be easy to use straight out of the box and was cheap to buy, due to special mobile carrier tariffs. An ETACS version of the rinGo with minor design changes (NHX-2NE) was launched in 1997 for the Austrian market by Mobilkom Austria.

In press releases it was also called a 'concept', a way of easily buying and using a mobile phone without operator registration. Nokia unusually created a unique "rinGo" brand and logo for it.

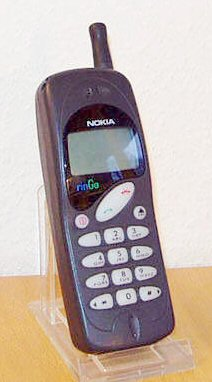
Nokia rinGo 2

In September 1997 a new rinGo model (NHX-4N) was introduced for ETACS, which was the UK's first pay as you go Nokia handset through Vodafone's pay as you talk package. The phone had a big oval shaped button for accepting and rejecting calls, and was thinner and available in a variety of colours. Later in October 1998 a third (NHX-7) model was released for ETACS in Italy and Spain (both versions 4N and 7 via operator Moviline). It featured the "Navi-key" like on the GSM Nokia 3110 and Nokia 5110 and had its top antenna positioned in the middle.

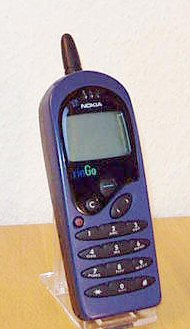
Nokia rinGo 3

The phones have the capacity to store about 60 contacts. Calculator, Watch and Calendar were pre installed on the handset.

Nokia marketed original rinGo targeting women and children. However it gained a negative reputation and in Sweden earned the nickname "bimbo phone", leading to low sales. Interest and popularity of the rinGo quickly faded and it has been largely forgotten since.

== See also ==
- List of Nokia products
