= Ringo (2005 film) =

Ringo is a short film directed by Conall Jones and Alf Seccombe. The cast includes Alf Seccombe and a pony named buttercup.

== Festivals ==
Ringo was in competition at the International Film Festival Rotterdam, and won the Audience Award at the 2005 Cal State Media Arts Festival "Past Winners". The film also played at Cinematexas 10, 2005 Santa Cruz International Film Festival, and the 21st Film Arts Festival.
