= Palo Alto International Film Festival =

The Palo Alto International Film Festival (abbreviated as PAIFF) was a four-day festival that ran at the end of September. The Festival celebrated the innovation in cinema. PAIFF's speakers series, Palo Alto Talks, hosted conversations between industry leaders in film and technology.

== Opening Night Films ==
The 2012 festival opened with the film Looper directed by Rian Johnson.

The 2011 festival opened with the film Life in a Day directed by Kevin Macdonald.

| Film title | Director | Year |
|---|---|---|
| Looper | Rian Johnson | 2012 |
| Life in a Day | Kevin Macdonald | 2011 |

== Tech Doc Competition ==
The 2012 Tech Doc Competition

| Film title | Director |
|---|---|
| Chasing Ice | Jeff Orlowski |
| Sexy Baby | Jill Bauer and Ronna Gradus |
| Side by Side | Christopher Kenneally |
| Time Zero: The Last Year of Polaroid Film | Grant Hamilton |
| We Are Legion: The Story of the Hacktivists | Brian Knappenberger |
| Welcome to the Machine | Avi Zev Weider |
