= Rango =

Rango may refer to:

== Media ==
- Rango (1931 film), a quasi-documentary
- Rango (2011 film), an animated comedy
  - Rango (video game), based on the 2011 film
- Rango (TV series), a 1967 Western
- "Rango" (song) (2013), by Catfish and the Bottlemen

== Places ==
- Commune of Rango, Kayanza Province, Burundi
- Prangli, formerly known as Rango, an Estonian island

== People ==
- Rango Narayan Orpe (fl. 1660s–1680s), warrior and administrative officer of the Maratha Empire
- Rango Bapuji Gupte (fl. 1840s–1850s), one of the leaders of the Indian Rebellion of 1858

== See also ==
- Rongo, god of cultivated food in Māori mythology
