= Association "Polish Community" =

Polish non-governmental organisation providing assistance to the Polish diaspora

Association "Polish Community" (Polish: Stowarzyszenie "Wspólnota Polska") is a Polish non-governmental and public benefit organization operating under the patronage of the Polish Senate; dedicated to strengthening the ties between Poland and Polonia - Poles and people of Polish origin living abroad. The current chairman is Dariusz Piotr Bonisławski since March 2017.

It was founded in 1990 by Andrzej Stelmachowski, professor of Wrocław University and Warsaw University, then-Sejm marshal, later Minister of Education, and until his death in April 2009, presidential advisor. Maciej Płażyński was the president of the association from May 11, 2008, until his death on April 10, 2010.

The organization receives sponsorship from Polish government.

In 2025, the organization was designated as undesirable in Russia.

== See also ==
- World Polonia Games
