= Irène Debrunner =

Swiss swimmer

Personal information
- Born: 14 October 1952 (age 74)

Sport
- Sport: Swimming

Irène Debrunner (born 14 October 1952) is a Swiss former freestyle swimmer. She competed in the women's 4 × 100 metre freestyle relay at the 1972 Summer Olympics.
