= Maciej Płażyński =

Polish politician (1958–2010)

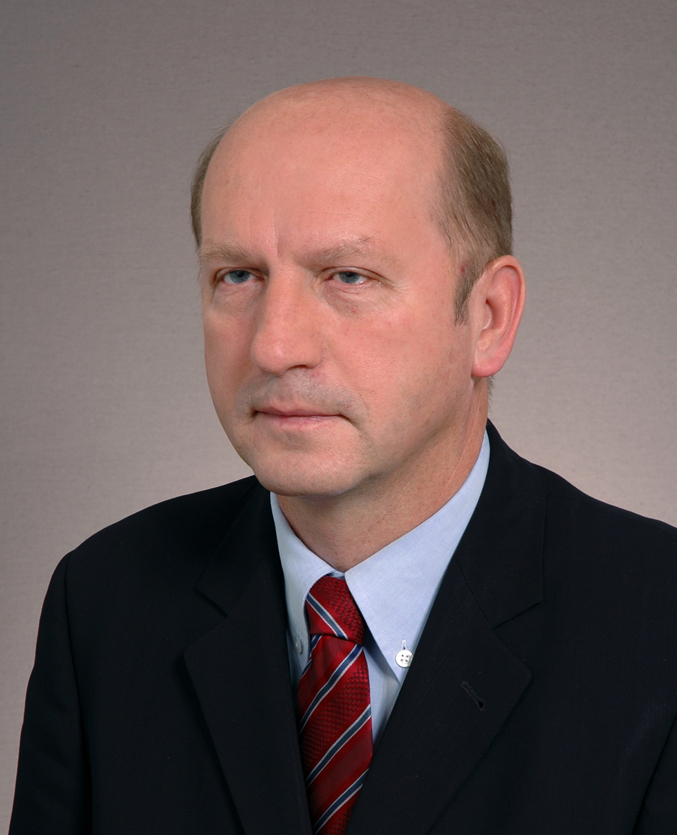
- Płażyński in 2005

Marshal of the Sejm
- In office 20 October 1997 – 18 October 2001
- Preceded by: Józef Zych
- Succeeded by: Marek Borowski

Chairman of Civic Platform (PO)
- In office 18 October 2001 – 1 June 2003
- Secretary-General: Grzegorz Schetyna
- Parliamentary Leader: Himself; Donald Tusk
- Preceded by: Position established
- Succeeded by: Donald Tusk

Parliamentary Leader of Civic Platform
- In office 18 October 2001 – 1 June 2003
- Leader: Himself
- Preceded by: Position established
- Succeeded by: Donald Tusk

Personal details
- Born: 10 February 1958 Młynary, Poland
- Died: 10 April 2010 (aged 52) Near Smolensk, Russia
- Party: Independent (2003–2010); Civic Platform (2001–2003); Solidarity Electoral Action (–2001)
- Spouse: Elżbieta Płażyńska
- Profession: Lawyer

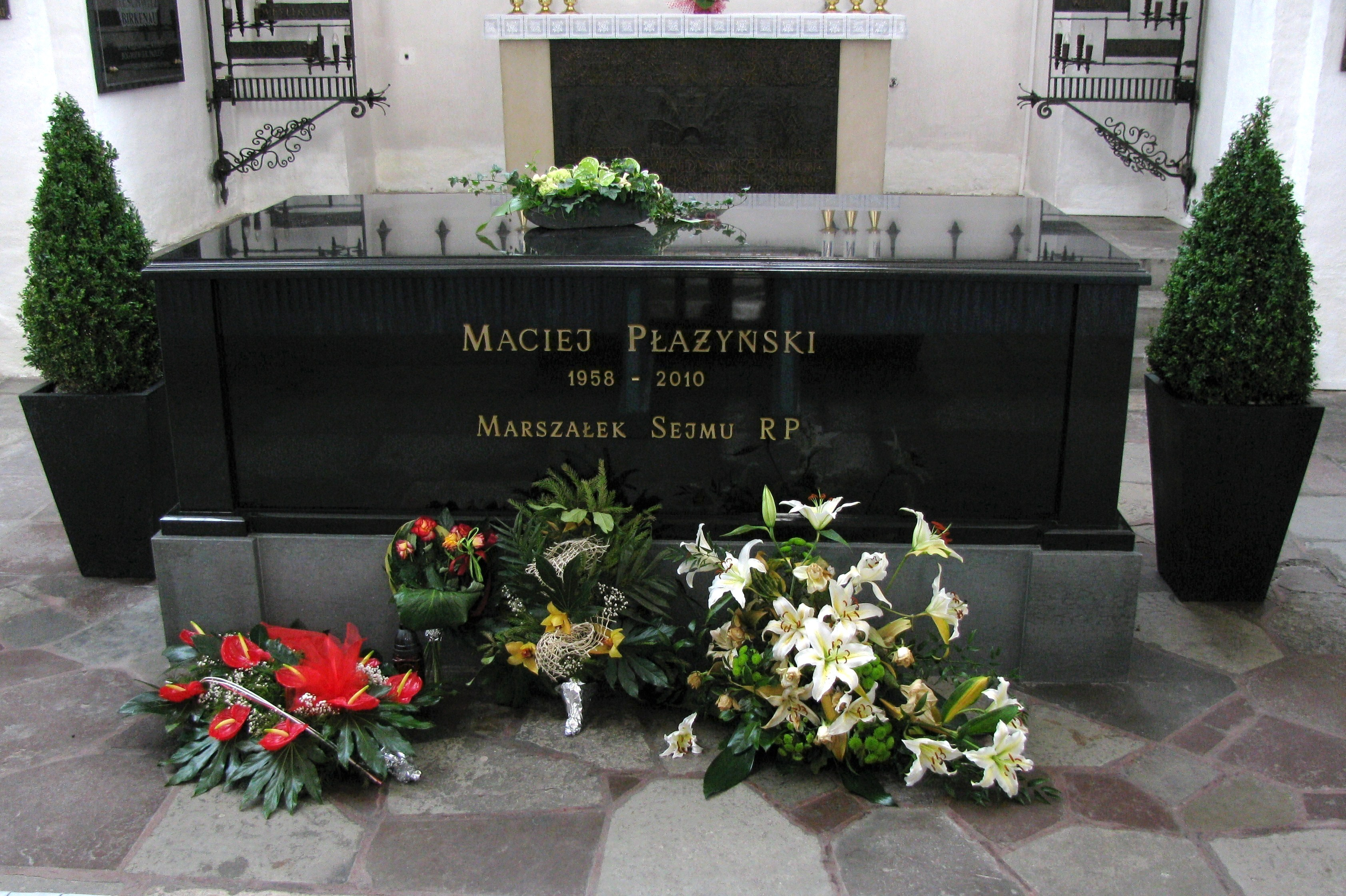
Maciej Plazynski tomb in St. Mary's Church, Gdańsk

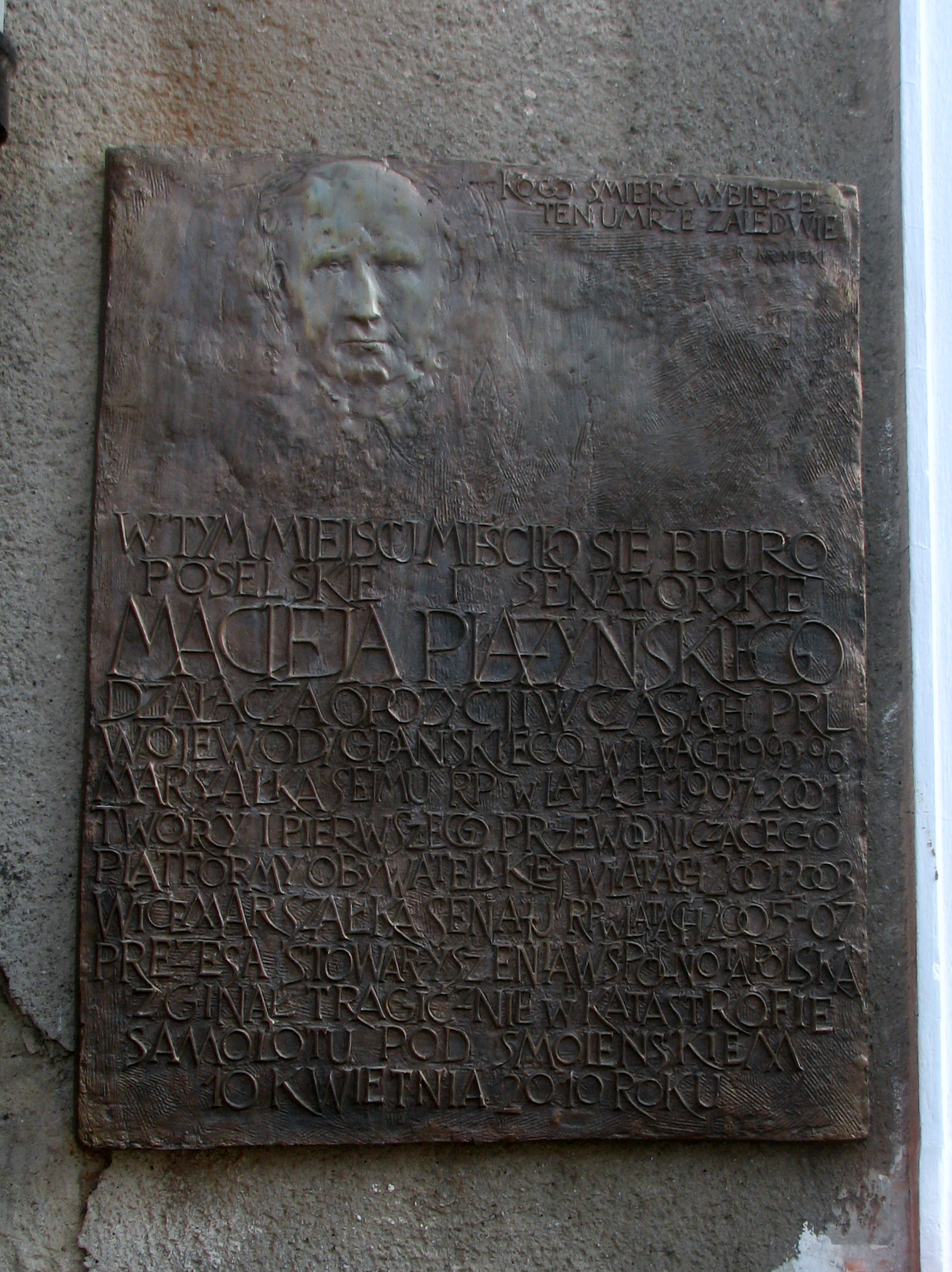
Plaque to Maciej Płażyński commemorating on the wall of his former parliamentary office in Gdańsk.

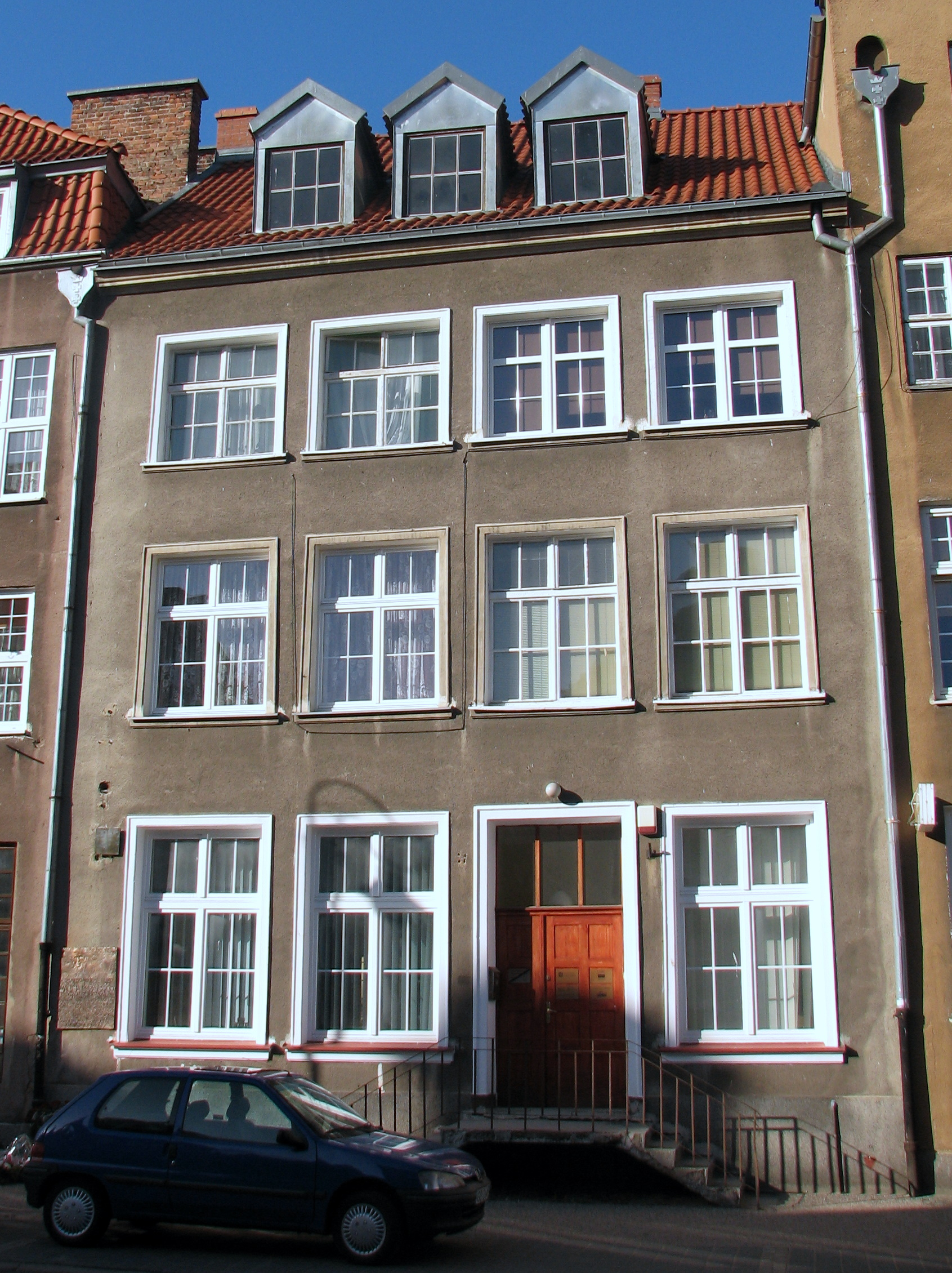
In this building at ulica Szeroka in Gdańsk was the parliamentary office of the deceased.

Maciej Płażyński (Polish pronunciation: [ˈmatɕɛj pwaˈʐɨɲskʲi]; 10 February 1958 – 10 April 2010) was a Polish liberal-conservative politician.

== Biography ==
Płażyński was born in Młynary. He began his political career in 1980 / 1981 as one of the leaders of the Students' Solidarity; he was governor of the Gdańsk Voivodship from August 1990 to July 1996, and was elected to the Sejm (the lower house of the Polish parliament) in September 1997. To date he is longest serving Marshal of the Sejm of the Third Republic of Poland.

In January 2001, he founded the Civic Platform political party with Donald Tusk and Andrzej Olechowski. He left Civic Platform for personal reasons and at the time of his death was an independent MP. He was member of Kashubian-Pomeranian Association. He was later chosen as a chairman of the Association "Polish Community".

Maciej Płażyński was married to Elżbieta Płażyńska and together they had three children: Jakub, Katarzyna, and Kacper.

Płażyński died in the plane crash which occurred while landing at Smolensk-North airport near Smolensk, Russia, on 10 April 2010. The crash also involved the last exile President Ryszard Kaczorowski, President Lech Kaczyński and 93 others.

== Honours and awards ==
In 2000, Płażyński was awarded the Order of Merit of the Italian Republic, First Class. He received the titles of honorary citizen of Młynary, Puck, Pionki and Lidzbark Warmiński.

On 16 April 2010 he was posthumously awarded the Grand Cross of the Order of Polonia Restituta. He was also awarded a Gold Medal of Gloria Artis.

== See also ==
- Solidarity
