= List of awards and nominations received by Daniel Craig =

Daniel Craig awards and nominations
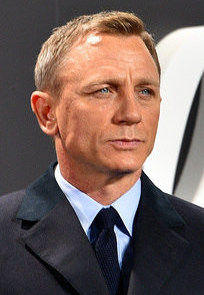
- Craig at the premiere of Spectre in 2015
Awards and nominations
Award	Wins	Nominations
British Academy Film Awards	0	1
Golden Globe Awards	0	3
Primetime Emmy Awards	0	1

Totals (Note: Certain award groups do not simply award one winner. They acknowledge several different recipients, have runners-up, and have third place. Since this is a specific recognition and is different from losing an award, runner-up mentions are considered wins in this award tally. For simplification and to avoid errors, each award in this list has been presumed to have had a prior nomination.)
- Wins: 25
- Nominations: 82

Daniel Wroughton Craig CMG (born 2 March 1968 in Chester, England) is a British actor.

Craig is the sixth actor to play secret agent James Bond in the Bond film series, starring in five films from 2006 to 2021. He received a nomination for the BAFTA Award for Best Actor in a Leading Role for his first film as Bond, Casino Royale (2006). He also won a Critics' Choice Movie Award for Best Actor in an Action Movie for Skyfall (2012) and was nominated again for the same award for Spectre (2015).

At the beginning of his career, Craig starred in various independent British films. He received three nominations at the British Independent Film Awards, winning Best Actor for Some Voices (2000), and won the London Film Critics' Circle Award for British Actor of the Year for Enduring Love (2004). His other non-Bond appearances since 2006 include Infamous (2006), which earned him a nomination for the Independent Spirit Award for Best Supporting Male, Cowboys & Aliens and The Girl with the Dragon Tattoo (both 2011), for which he received nominations for various awards. His performance as the private detective Benoit Blanc in the films Knives Out (2019) and its sequel Glass Onion: A Knives Out Mystery (2022) earned him two nominations for the Golden Globe Award for Best Actor in a Motion Picture – Musical or Comedy.

In 2007, Craig was invited to join the Academy of Motion Picture Arts and Sciences. In 2021, he was honoured with a star on the Hollywood Walk of Fame, and was also made an honorary Commander (RN) in September of 2021. He was honoured with a CMG in the 2022 New Year's Honours by Queen Elizabeth II.

== Awards and nominations ==
Awards and nominations received by Daniel Craig
Award	Year (Note: Indicates the year of ceremony.)	Category	Nominated work	Result	Ref.
AACTA International Awards	2025	Best Actor	Queer	Nominated	
AARP Movies for Grownups Awards	2025	Best Actor	Queer	Nominated	
Alliance of Women Film Journalists Awards	2012	Best Depiction of Nudity, Sexuality, or Seduction (Note: shared with Rooney Mara)	The Girl with the Dragon Tattoo	Nominated	
Alliance of Women Film Journalists Awards	2012	Most Egregious Age Difference Between the Leading Man and the Love Interest	The Girl with the Dragon Tattoo	Nominated	
Alliance of Women Film Journalists Awards	2016	Most Egregious Age Difference Between the Leading Man and the Love Interest (Note: shared with Léa Seydoux)	Spectre	Nominated	
Alliance of Women Film Journalists Awards	2022	Most Egregious Age Difference Between the Leading Man and the Love Interest	No Time to Die	Won	
Alliance of Women Film Journalists Awards	2025	Best Actor	Queer	Nominated	
Austin Film Critics Association Awards	2023	Best Ensemble (Note: Shared with the cast of Glass Onion: A Knives Out Mystery)	Glass Onion: A Knives Out Mystery	Nominated	
Berlin International Film Festival	2000	EFP Shooting Star	Daniel Craig	Won	
Britannia Awards	2012	British Artist of the Year	Daniel Craig	Won	
British Academy Film Awards	2007	Best Actor in a Leading Role	Casino Royale	Nominated	
British Independent Film Awards	1999	Best Actor in a British Independent Film	The Trench	Nominated	
British Independent Film Awards	2000	Best Actor in a British Independent Film	Some Voices	Won	
British Independent Film Awards	2004	Best Actor in a British Independent Film	Enduring Love	Nominated	
British Independent Film Awards	2007	Variety Award	Daniel Craig	Won	
Capri Hollywood International Film Festival	2023	Best Ensemble Cast	Glass Onion: A Knives Out Mystery	Won	
Critics' Choice Movie Awards	2013	Best Actor in an Action Movie	Skyfall	Won	
Critics' Choice Movie Awards	2016	Best Actor in an Action Movie	Spectre	Nominated	
Critics' Choice Movie Awards	2020	Best Acting Ensemble (Note: shared with the cast of Knives Out)	Knives Out	Nominated	
Critics' Choice Movie Awards	2023	Best Acting Ensemble	Glass Onion: A Knives Out Mystery	Won	
Critics' Choice Movie Awards	2025	Best Actor	Queer	Nominated	
Critics' Choice Super Awards	2022	Best Actor in an Action Movie	No Time to Die	Won	
Drama Desk Awards	2017	Outstanding Actor in a Play	Othello	Nominated	
Drama League Awards	2010	Distinguished Performance	A Steady Rain	Nominated	
Drama League Awards	2017	Distinguished Performance	Othello	Nominated	
Edinburgh International Film Festival	1998	Best British Performance (Note: shared with Derek Jacobi)	Love Is the Devil: Study for a Portrait of Francis Bacon	Won	
Empire Awards	2005	Best British Actor	Layer Cake	Nominated	
Empire Awards	2007	Best Actor	Casino Royale	Won	
Empire Awards	2009	Best Actor	Quantum of Solace	Nominated	
Empire Awards	2012	Best Actor	The Girl with the Dragon Tattoo	Nominated	
Empire Awards	2013	Best Actor	Skyfall	Nominated	
European Film Awards	2004	People's Choice Award for Best Actor	The Mother	Nominated	
European Film Awards	2005	People's Choice Award for Best Actor	Enduring Love and Layer Cake	Nominated	
European Film Awards	2024	European Actor	Queer	Nominated	
Evening Standard British Film Awards	2007	Best Actor	Casino Royale	Won	
Evening Standard British Film Awards	2018	Best Supporting Actor	Logan Lucky	Nominated	
Evening Standard Theatre Awards	2002	Best Actor	A Number	Nominated	
Georgia Film Critics Association Awards	2023	Best Ensemble Cast	Glass Onion: A Knives Out Mystery	Won	
Golden Globe Awards	2020	Best Actor in a Motion Picture – Musical or Comedy	Knives Out	Nominated	
Golden Globe Awards	2023	Best Actor in a Motion Picture – Musical or Comedy	Glass Onion: A Knives Out Mystery	Nominated	
Golden Globe Awards	2025	Best Actor in a Motion Picture – Drama	Queer	Nominated	
Goldene Kamera	2009	Best International Actor	Daniel Craig	Won	
Hollywood Critics Association Awards	2020	Best Cast Ensemble	Knives Out	Won	
Hollywood Critics Association Awards	2023	Best Cast Ensemble	Glass Onion: A Knives Out Mystery	Nominated	
Houston Film Critics Society Awards	2023	Best Ensemble Cast	Glass Onion: A Knives Out Mystery	Nominated	
Independent Spirit Awards	2007	Best Supporting Male	Infamous	Nominated	
Irish Film and Television Awards	2007	Best International Actor	Casino Royale	Nominated	
London Film Critics' Circle	1998	British Supporting Actor of the Year	Love Is the Devil: Study for a Portrait of Francis Bacon	Nominated	
London Film Critics' Circle	2004	British Actor of the Year	The Mother	Nominated	
London Film Critics' Circle	2005	British Actor of the Year	Enduring Love	Won	
London Film Critics' Circle	2013	British Actor of the Year	Skyfall	Nominated	
London Film Critics' Circle	2025	Actor of the Year	Queer	Nominated	
London Film Critics' Circle	2025	Dilys Powell Award for Excellence in Film	Queer	Honored	
MTV Movie & TV Awards	2013	Best Fight (Note: shared with Ola Rapace)	Skyfall	Nominated	
MTV Movie & TV Awards	2013	Best Shirtless Performance	Skyfall	Nominated	
MTV Movie & TV Awards	2022	Best Hero	No Time to Die	Nominated	
National Board of Review Awards	2019	Best Ensemble	Knives Out	Won	
National Board of Review Awards	2024	Best Actor	Queer	Won	
National Film Awards	2016	Best Actor	Spectre	Nominated	
National Movie Awards	2007	Best Male Performance	Casino Royale	Nominated	
New York Film Critics Online Awards	2022	Best Ensemble Cast	Glass Onion: A Knives Out Mystery	Won	
Outer Critics Circle Awards	2017	Outstanding Actor in a Play	Othello	Nominated	
People's Choice Awards	2021	Favorite Male Movie Star	No Time to Die	Nominated	
People's Choice Awards	2021	Favorite Action Movie Star	No Time to Die	Nominated	
Primetime Emmy Awards	2014	Outstanding Narrator	One Life	Nominated	
San Diego Film Critics Society	2017	Best Comedic Performance	Logan Lucky	Won	
San Diego Film Critics Society	2019	Best Comedic Performance	Knives Out	Nominated	
San Diego Film Critics Society	2023	Best Comedic Performance	Glass Onion: A Knives Out Mystery	Nominated	
San Diego Film Critics Society	2023	Best Ensemble	Glass Onion: A Knives Out Mystery	Nominated	
San Diego Film Critics Society	2024	Best Actor	Queer	Runner-up	
Sant Jordi Awards	2007	Best Foreign Actor	Casino Royale and Enduring Love	Won	
Satellite Awards	2019	Best Actor – Motion Picture Comedy or Musical	Knives Out	Nominated	
Satellite Awards	2019	Best Cast – Motion Picture	Knives Out	Won	
Satellite Awards	2023	Best Actor – Motion Picture Comedy or Musical	Glass Onion: A Knives Out Mystery	Nominated	
Satellite Awards	2023	Best Cast – Motion Picture	Glass Onion: A Knives Out Mystery	Won	
Saturn Awards	2007	Best Actor	Casino Royale	Nominated	
Saturn Awards	2013	Best Actor	Skyfall	Nominated	
Saturn Awards	2021	Best Actor	Knives Out	Nominated	
Scream Awards	2011	Best Science Fiction Actor	Cowboys & Aliens	Nominated	
Screen Actors Guild Awards	2025	Outstanding Performance by a Male Actor in a Leading Role	Queer	Nominated	
St. Louis Film Critics Association Awards	2022	Best Actor	Glass Onion: A Knives Out Mystery	Nominated	
St. Louis Film Critics Association Awards	2022	Best Ensemble	Glass Onion: A Knives Out Mystery	Runner-up	
St. Louis Film Critics Association Awards	2024	Best Actor	Queer	Nominated	
Teen Choice Awards	2013	Choice Movie Actor – Action	Skyfall	Nominated	
Washington D.C. Area Film Critics Association Awards	2022	Best Acting Ensemble	Glass Onion: A Knives Out Mystery	Won	
Washington D.C. Area Film Critics Association Awards	2024	Best Actor	Queer	Nominated	
