= The Soul of Medicine =

2009 book by Sherwin B. Nuland

The Soul of Medicine: Tales from the Bedside
- First edition
- Author: Sherwin B. Nuland
- Language: English
- Subject: Medicine
- Publisher: Kaplan Publishing
- Publication date: 2009
- Publication place: United States
- Media type: Print (hardback · paperback)
- Pages: 232
- ISBN: 978-1-60714-055-9

The Soul of Medicine: Tales from the Bedside is a 2009 book by Sherwin B. Nuland. It was first published on April 14, 2009, through Kaplan Publishing.

== Synopsis ==
This collection of anecdotes, written by Sherwin B. Nuland, portrays different doctors from an array of specialties that each write about their most memorable patient. The medicine spoken about in this book is from an earlier era, which shows the best and the worst moments of many surgeons and doctors. Each chapter in this book consists of a different unrelated story from the previous, yet all are recollections of Nuland's peers while he was doing his residency in Yale-New Haven Hospital. In the book he disguises the hospital as "Canterbury".

== Publication ==
The Soul of Medicine: Tales from the Bedside was first published in hardback through Kaplan Publishing on April 14, 2009. A paperback edition was released the following March, also through Kaplan.

== Reception ==
In a review for The New York Times, Sandeep Jauhar stated that they were "hoping for much more from this slim book" but that "despite its antediluvian elements, there are some timeless lessons here". The Soul of Medicine also received reviews from JAMA, the Student BMJ, and the Hampton Roads Business Journal, the last of which stated that "The strange thing about these stories is that most of the incidents took place several decades ago, in a time when attitudes, technology and advances weren't what they are now. While it doesn't affect the telling or the lessons involved, reading them sometimes feels like watching an old 'Dr. Kildare' episode on TV: quaint, interesting, and a peek into a past we won't miss."
