= BMJ (disambiguation) =

The BMJ is a medical journal.

BMJ may also refer to:

- BMJ (company), The BMJ publisher
- Federal Ministry of Justice (Germany) (German: Bundesministerium der Justiz)
- Baramita Airport, Guyana (IATA:BMJ)
- Barbican Mission to the Jews, a British Christian society
- Bemidji Airlines, United States (ICAO:BMJ)
- Bote-Majhi language, spoken in Nepal (ISO 639:bmj)

== See also ==
- BMJ Open, an open access journal
- Student BMJ, a student journal
