= Daniel Craig =

English actor (born 1968)

Daniel Craig CMG
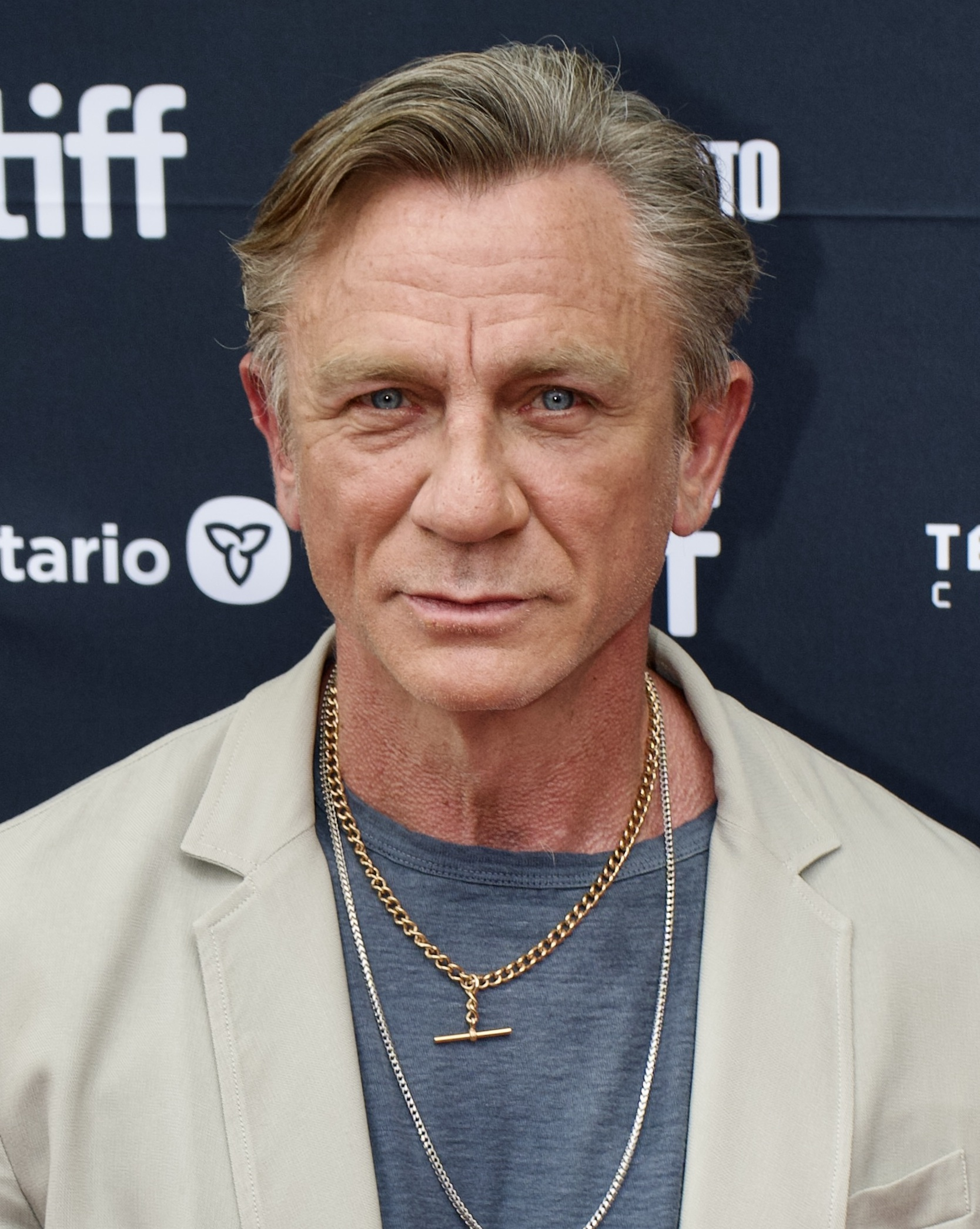
- Craig in 2025
- Born: Daniel Wroughton Craig; 2 March 1968 (age 58); Chester, Cheshire, England
- Citizenship: United Kingdom; United States
- Education: Guildhall School of Music and Drama
- Occupations: Actor; producer
- Years active: 1992–present
- Spouses: Fiona Loudon (m. 1992; div. 1994); Rachel Weisz (m. 2011)
- Children: 2
- Awards: Full list

Daniel Wroughton Craig (/kreɪɡ/ CRAYG; born 2 March 1968) is an English actor. He gained international fame by playing the fictional secret agent James Bond in the films Casino Royale (2006), Quantum of Solace (2008), Skyfall (2012), Spectre (2015) and No Time to Die (2021).

After training at the National Youth Theatre in London and graduating from the Guildhall School of Music and Drama in 1991, Craig began his career on stage. He began acting with the drama The Power of One (1992), and had his breakthrough role in the drama serial Our Friends in the North (1996). He gained prominence for his supporting roles in films such as Elizabeth (1998), Lara Croft: Tomb Raider (2001), Road to Perdition (2002), Layer Cake (2004) and Munich (2005).

In 2006, Craig played Bond in Casino Royale, a reboot of the Bond franchise that was favourably received by critics and for which Craig was nominated for the BAFTA Award for Best Actor in a Leading Role. Since then he has acted in many films, including the fantasy The Golden Compass (2007), the drama Defiance (2008), the science fiction Western Cowboys & Aliens (2011), the mystery thriller The Girl with the Dragon Tattoo (2011) and the heist film Logan Lucky (2017). He has also played Benoit Blanc in the Knives Out film series since 2019. He starred in the romantic drama Queer (2024), for which he was nominated for Best Actor at the Golden Globe Awards, Critics' Choice Movie Awards and Screen Actors Guild Awards.

On stage, Craig starred in the Royal National Theatre's production of Angels in America (1993) on the West End. He made his Broadway debut in the play A Steady Rain (2009) and returned to Broadway in the revivals of Harold Pinter's Betrayal (2011) and William Shakespeare's Macbeth (2022). He starred as Iago in the New York Theatre Workshop production of Othello (2016).

== Early life and education ==
Daniel Wroughton Craig was born on 2 March 1968 in Chester, Cheshire, to an art teacher, Carol Olivia (née Williams), and Timothy John Wroughton Craig, a midshipman in the Merchant Navy and steel erector. His father later became the landlord of two Cheshire pubs: The Ring o' Bells in Frodsham and The Boot Inn in Tarporley. Craig has an older sister named Lea (born 1965), and a younger half-brother named Harry (1991). He is of part Welsh and distant French descent, counting the French Huguenot minister Daniel Chamier and Sir William Burnaby, 1st Baronet, among his ancestors. His middle name, Wroughton, comes from his great-great-grandmother, Grace Matilda Wroughton.

When Craig's parents divorced in 1972, he and his sister moved to the Wirral Peninsula with their mother, where he attended primary school in Hoylake as well as school in Frodsham. He attended Hilbre High School in West Kirby. Upon leaving at the age of 16, he attended Calday Grange Grammar School as a sixth form student. He played rugby union for Hoylake RFC.

Craig began acting in school plays at the age of six, making his debut in the Frodsham Primary School production of Oliver! He became interested in serious acting by attending Liverpool's Everyman Theatre with his mother. At the age of 14 in 1982, he played roles in Romeo and Juliet and Cinderella at Hilbre High School. In 1984, he was accepted into the National Youth Theatre and moved to London, where he worked part-time in restaurants to finance his education. His parents watched his stage debut as Agamemnon in Troilus And Cressida. He performed with the National Youth Theatre on tours to Valencia and Moscow under the leadership of director Edward Wilson. He entered the Guildhall School of Music and Drama in 1988, and graduated in 1991 after a three-year course under the tutelage of Colin McCormack, an actor from the Royal Shakespeare Company.

== Career ==
=== 1992–2005: Early roles and breakthrough ===
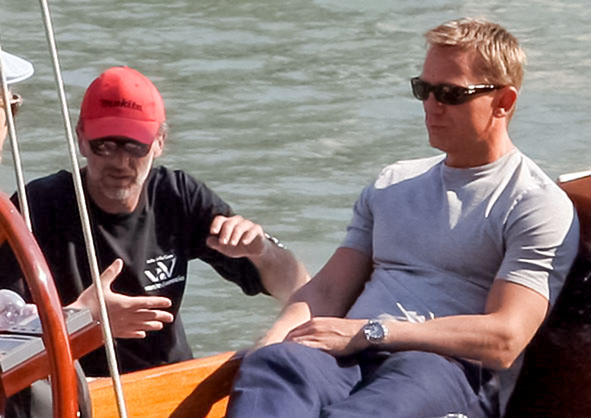
Craig with producer Michael G. Wilson in June 2006, filming Casino Royale

Craig appeared in his first screen role in 1992, playing an Afrikaner in The Power of One. Having played minor roles in the miniseries Anglo-Saxon Attitudes and the shows Covington Cross and Boon, he appeared in November 1993 as Joe in the Royal National Theatre's production of Tony Kushner's Angels in America. Also in 1993, Craig was featured in two episodes of the American television shows Zorro and George Lucas's The Young Indiana Jones Chronicles, and British shows Heartbeat, in which he played Peter Begg; Between the Lines; Drop the Dead Donkey and Sharpe's Eagle. In 1994, Craig appeared in The Rover, a filmed stage production and Les Grandes Horizontales, a stage production at the National Theatre Studio, where he first met Rachel Weisz, who would become his second wife. Craig was featured in the poorly received Disney film A Kid in King Arthur's Court (1995). In 1996, Craig starred in the BBC drama serial Our Friends in the North as the troubled George 'Geordie' Peacock. Appearing alongside Christopher Eccleston, Gina McKee and Mark Strong, Craig's part in the series is considered his breakthrough role.

In the same year, Craig guest-starred in an episode of the HBO horror anthology series Tales from the Crypt and was featured in the BBC television film Saint-Ex. Craig gave a lead performance in the Franco-German drama Obsession in 1997, about a love triangle between Craig's character and a couple. The same year, he played a leading role in Hurlyburly, a play performed in the West End at the Old Vic.

Craig appeared in three films in 1998: the independent drama Love and Rage, the biographical drama Elizabeth, in which he played Jesuit priest John Ballard, who was executed for being involved in the Babington Plot, an attempt to assassinate Queen Elizabeth I of England, and the BBC television film Love Is the Devil: Study for a Portrait of Francis Bacon (1998), in which Craig played small-time thief George Dyer who becomes the lover and muse of painter Francis Bacon, who was portrayed by Derek Jacobi. The following year, Craig starred in a television drama called Shockers: The Visitor and as Sergeant Telford Winter in the independent war film The Trench, which takes place in the confines of the trenches in the First World War during the 48 hours leading up to the Battle of the Somme.

Craig played a schizophrenic man who falls in love with a woman (played by Kelly Macdonald) after being discharged from psychiatric hospital in the drama Some Voices (2000). Also in 2000, Craig co-starred alongside Toni Collette in the dark comedy Hotel Splendide and was featured in I Dreamed of Africa, based on the life of Kuki Gallmann (played by Kim Basinger). Craig played the love interest of Angelina Jolie's character Lara Croft in Lara Croft: Tomb Raider (2001), based on the video game series Tomb Raider. He later admitted to having taken on the role in the poorly-reviewed yet commercially successful film only for the money. In 2001, Craig also starred in the four-part Channel 4 drama Sword of Honour, based on the trilogy of novels of the same. Craig appeared in the anthology film Ten Minutes Older: The Cello (2002), starring in the segment "Addicted to the Stars", directed by Michael Radford.

His second release of 2002 was Sam Mendes' crime film Road to Perdition with Tom Hanks and Paul Newman, in which he played Irish mobster Connor Rooney, the son of the crime organisation's boss. Craig then portrayed German theoretical physicist Werner Heisenberg in the BBC television drama Copenhagen (2002), which depicts Heisenberg's involvement in the German nuclear weapon project during World War II. On stage, Craig starred opposite Michael Gambon in the original production of Caryl Churchill's play A Number from September to November 2002 at the Royal Court Theatre. Craig was nominated for a London Evening Standard Theatre Award for Best Actor for his role as a man who is cloned twice by his father. The next year, he starred as poet Ted Hughes opposite Gwyneth Paltrow as Sylvia Plath in the biographical film Sylvia (2003), which depicts the romance between the two poets. In the same year, he appeared in The Mother as a man who engages in an affair with the much older mother (played by Anne Reid) of his lover and best friend.

The crime thriller Layer Cake, directed by Matthew Vaughn, starred Craig as an unnamed London-based cocaine supplier known only as "XXXX" in the film's credits. Kevin Crust, writing for the Los Angeles Times, praised Craig's "stunningly suave performance", while Roger Ebert thought he was "fascinating" in the film. Craig next starred as a man who is stalked by a stranger (played by Rhys Ifans) after they witness a deadly accident together in Enduring Love (2004).

Craig appeared in three theatrical films in 2005, all of which were supporting roles. His first release of the year, was the thriller The Jacket starring Adrien Brody and Keira Knightley. He then appeared briefly in the Hungarian film Fateless as a United States Army Sergeant who takes a liking to a teenage boy who survives life in concentration camps. Craig's third and final role of the year was in Munich, directed by Steven Spielberg, as a South African driver who is a part of a covert Israeli government mission to assassinate 11 Palestinians allegedly involved in the Munich massacre at the 1972 Summer Olympics. Also in 2005, Craig starred in the BBC television film Archangel – based on Robert Harris' novel – as an English academic who stumbles upon a notebook believed to have belonged to Joseph Stalin.

=== 2006–2021: James Bond and worldwide recognition ===
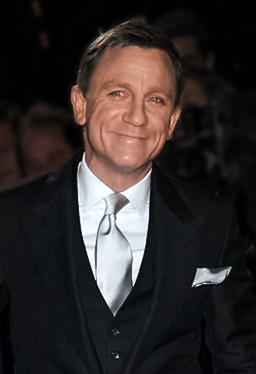
Craig at the Quantum of Solace film premiere in New York in November 2008

According to various sources, EON Productions had become aware of Craig and begun to consider him as a future Bond candidate because of Our Friends in the North in 1996 or Elizabeth in 1998.

In 2004, Craig first met longtime Bond co-producer Barbara Broccoli at the funeral of casting director Mary Selway, who had cast Craig in Love Is the Devil. Broccoli asked Craig to join her for "a cup of tea" at EON's Piccadilly office, and offered him the role of James Bond. Initially, he was unsure about the role and was resistant to the producers' overtures. "There was a period of trying to woo him", Broccoli later commented in 2012. During this period, Craig sought advice from colleagues and friends, of whom "most of us said to him ... 'there is life after Bond'". He asked Pierce Brosnan at an event for advice and Brosnan told him, "Go for it. Just go for it." He stated he "was aware of the challenges" of the Bond franchise, which he considered "a big machine that makes a lot of money". He aimed at bringing more "emotional depth" to the character.

Craig's casting as Bond was controversial, due to his physical appearance. Some fans considered the blond-haired, 5-foot-10-inch-tall (1.78 m) Craig to not fit the image of the taller, dark-haired Bond portrayed by the previous actors. Throughout the entire production period, Internet campaigns expressed their dissatisfaction and threatened to boycott the film in protest. Although the choice of Craig was controversial, numerous actors publicly voiced their support. Most notably, four of the five actors who had previously portrayed Bond – Sean Connery, Roger Moore, Pierce Brosnan and Timothy Dalton – believed his casting to be a good decision. Connery notably shared his thoughts on Craig's casting as Bond in 2008, describing him as "fantastic, marvelous in the part". The other actor to have previously played Bond, George Lazenby, has also since voiced his approval of Craig. Clive Owen, who had been linked to the role, also spoke in defence of Craig.

Craig's debut as James Bond came with Casino Royale, premiering on 14 November 2006 and grossing US$594,239,066 worldwide, making it the highest-grossing Bond film until the release of Skyfall in 2012. Upon the film's release, Craig's performance received critical acclaim. Additionally, he lent his voice and likeness as James Bond to both the Wii game GoldenEye 007, an enhanced remake of the 1997 game for the Nintendo 64, and James Bond 007: Blood Stone. Craig appeared in two further films in 2006: the drama Infamous as mass murderer Perry Edward Smith and as the voice of the lead character in the English-language version of the French animated film Renaissance. In 2007, Craig was invited to join the Academy of Motion Picture Arts and Sciences.

Craig starred opposite Nicole Kidman in the science fiction horror film The Invasion in 2007, the fourth film adaptation of the novel The Body Snatchers by Jack Finney, which was met with a negative reception. He portrayed Lord Asriel in The Golden Compass, the 2007 film adaptation of Philip Pullman's novel. In March 2007, Craig made a cameo appearance as himself in a sketch with Catherine Tate who appeared in the guise of her character Elaine Figgis from The Catherine Tate Show. The sketch was made for the BBC Red Nose Day 2007 fundraising programme. In 2008, in addition to Quantum of Solace and its accompanying video game, Craig starred in the drama Flashbacks of a Fool alongside Emilia Fox, as a washed-up Hollywood actor who reflects on his life; although the film was received negatively, Craig's performance was praised. In his final release of 2008, the war film Defiance, Craig starred as Tuvia Bielski, the leader of the Bielski partisans, fighting in the forests of Belarus during World War II, saving 1,200 people.

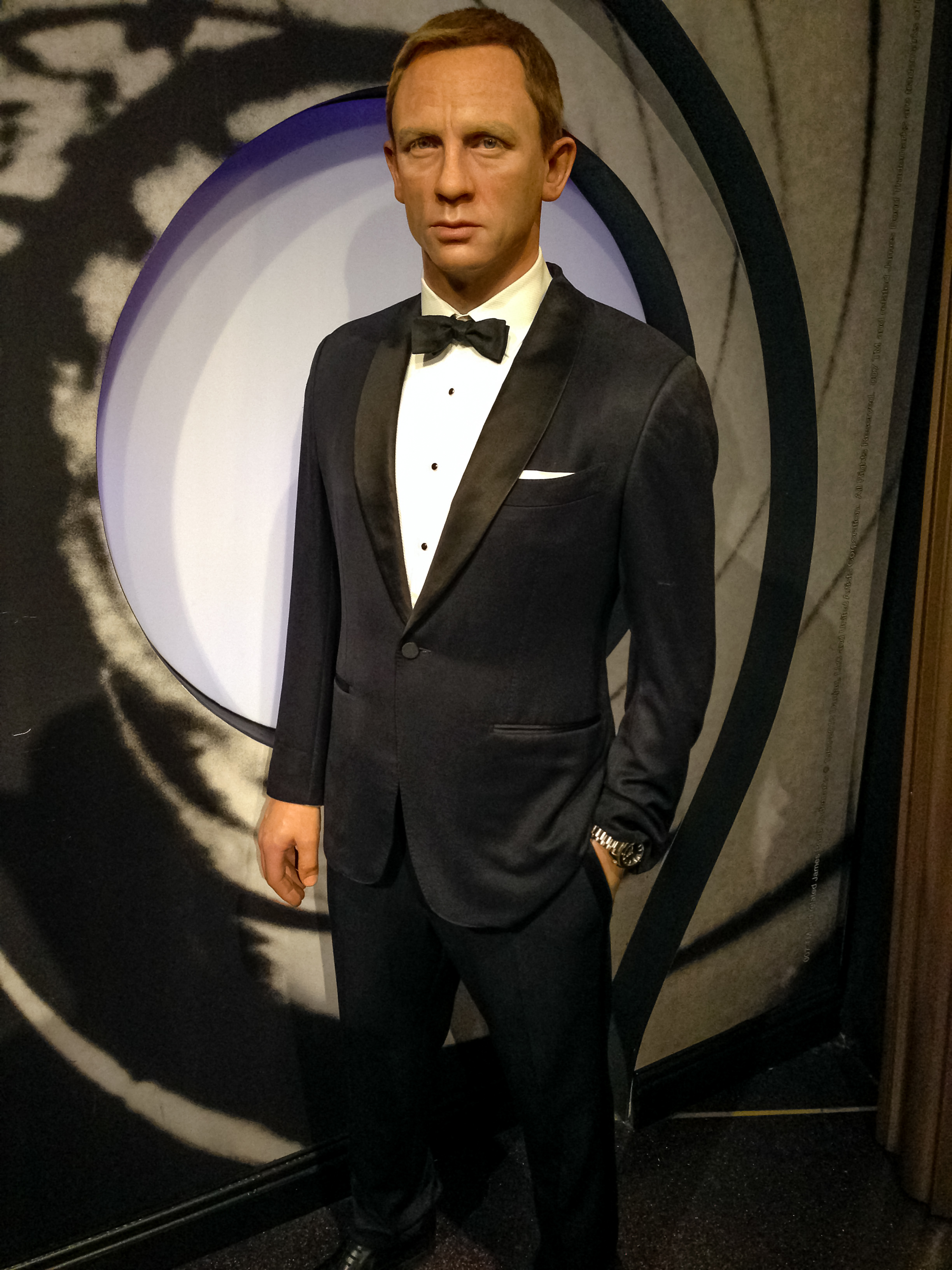
Wax statue of Craig as James Bond at Madame Tussauds in London

He co-starred with Hugh Jackman in a limited engagement of the drama A Steady Rain, on Broadway, which played in autumn 2009 at the Schoenfeld Theatre, for which he gained positive reviews. In 2011, Craig starred as investigative journalist Mikael Blomkvist in David Fincher's 2011 adaptation of Stieg Larsson's novel The Girl with the Dragon Tattoo. Also in 2011, he took up a leading role in Dream House, a psychological thriller directed by Jim Sheridan and co-starring Rachel Weisz, Naomi Watts and Marton Csokas. It garnered mostly negative reviews and low box office results. Craig then co-starred with Harrison Ford and Olivia Wilde in Cowboys & Aliens, an American science fiction Western film, based on Scott Mitchell Rosenberg's 2006 graphic novel of the same name. The same year, Craig voiced a dual role in Steven Spielberg's animated film The Adventures of Tintin in 2011, playing both the villainous pirate Ivan Ivanovitch Sakharine and his ancestor Red Rackham.

The planned 19 April 2010 release of Craig's third Bond film was delayed because of financial troubles; the film, titled Skyfall, was eventually released on 23 October 2012. The same year, he appeared as James Bond in the short film Happy and Glorious, in which he escorted Queen Elizabeth II to the 2012 Summer Olympics opening ceremony. He and his wife Weisz starred in a Broadway play titled Betrayal, which ran from October 2013 to January 2014. Despite mixed reviews, it grossed US$17.5 million, becoming the second highest earning Broadway play of 2013. Craig's fourth Bond film, Spectre, began filming in December 2014 and was released on 26 October 2015. His first four Bond films have grossed US$3.5 billion globally, after adjusting for inflation.

Prior to the inaugural Invictus Games held in London in September 2014, Craig, along with other entertainers and athletes, read the poem "Invictus" in a promotional video. In 2015, he had an uncredited cameo as a stormtrooper in Star Wars: The Force Awakens. Craig appeared in a modern production of William Shakespeare's tragedy Othello at the Off-Broadway New York Theatre Workshop throughout late 2016 and early 2017. The production starred David Oyelowo as the titular character and Craig as the main antagonist, Iago. Diane Snyder of The Daily Telegraph praised his "chilling" portrayal of Iago in the play.

In 2017, Craig co-starred in Steven Soderbergh's comedy Logan Lucky, about two brothers who pull off a heist during a NASCAR race. Craig starred alongside Halle Berry in the drama Kings set during the 1992 Los Angeles riots. The film premiered in September 2017 and was distributed by the Orchard the following year. In 2019, Craig starred in Rian Johnson's black comedy murder-mystery Knives Out as Benoit Blanc, a detective investigating the sudden death of a family patriarch. It premiered at the 2019 Toronto International Film Festival, and was theatrically released that November. Knives Out earned critical praise and found success at the box office. He earned a Golden Globe Award nomination for his performance.

After delays due to the COVID-19 pandemic, Craig's fifth and final Bond film, No Time to Die, was released in September 2021 and received favourable reviews. Craig said No Time to Die was his last film as James Bond. Two days before the film's release in the US, Craig was awarded a star on the Hollywood Walk of Fame which is located at 7007 Hollywood Boulevard (referring to Bond's code number "007"), and next to the star of fellow Bond actor Roger Moore.

=== 2022–present: Post-Bond work ===
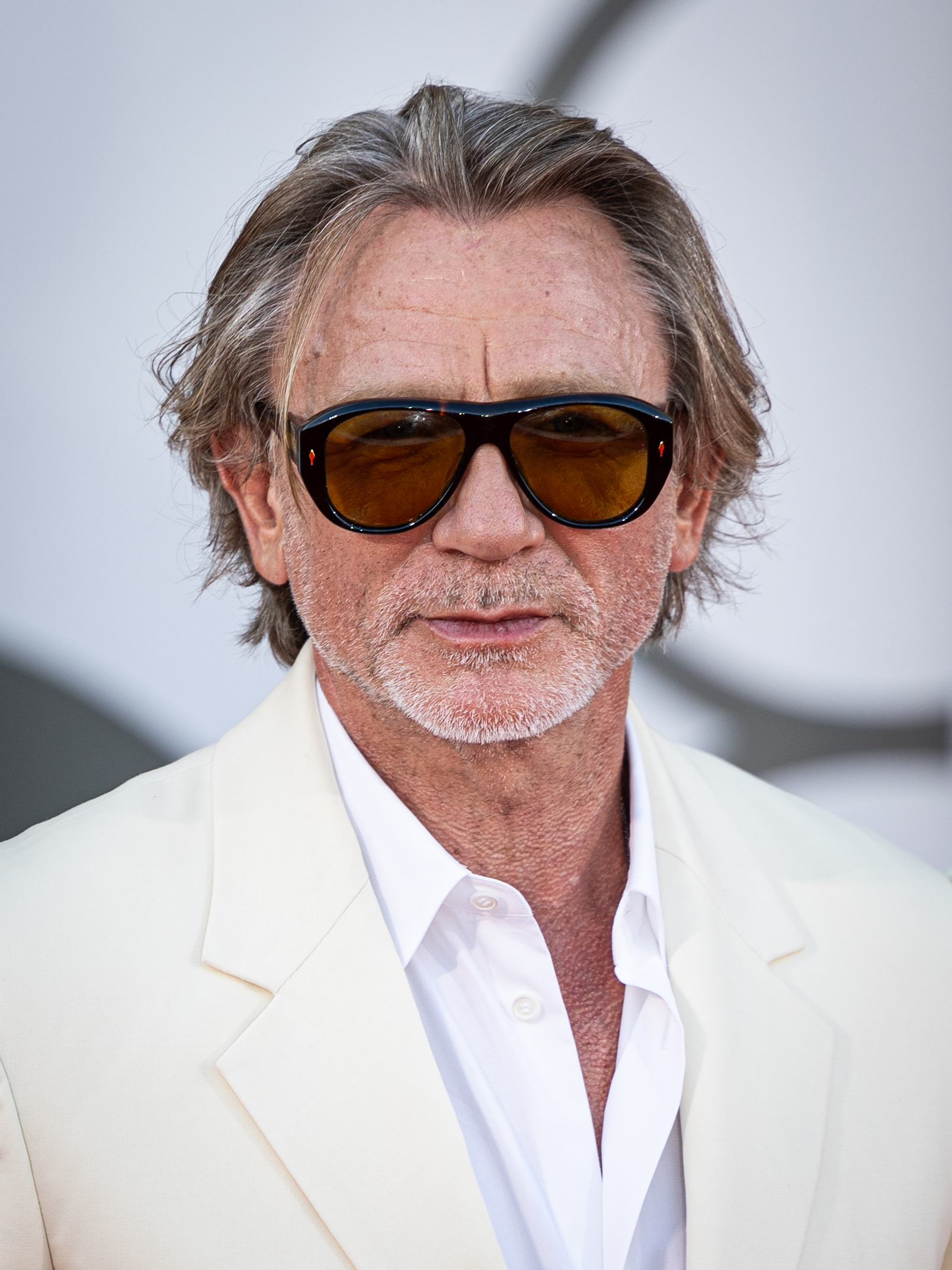
Craig in Venice in 2024 for the premiere of Queer

In 2022, Craig starred in a contemporary revival of Macbeth opposite Ruth Negga on Broadway. Variety described his performance writing "Craig has some strong moments but does not capture the transformation of Macbeth into a power-hungry tyrant." The Guardian's Alexis Soloski rated the production 3/5, stating, "... Craig's burly Macbeth, clad handsomely in Suttirat Larlab's modern dress costumes, is every inch a man of action and a soldier, even in a silky bathrobe, entirely convincing in motion, less persuasive when zipping through Macbeth's equivocations." Craig also starred in Glass Onion, a sequel to Knives Out directed by Johnson.

In 2024, he starred as William Lee in Luca Guadagnino's adaptation of William S. Burroughs novel Queer. The film premiered at the 81st Venice International Film Festival. Craig's performance was praised by critics. Craig stated "The reason I wanted to get into cinema was because of movies like this. ... Scripts don't come around like this very often, directors don't come around like this very often. I didn't know what the end result would be, but I knew the journey was going to be something else. And that's really what appealed to me, to be working with such a wonderful person, the most creative and exciting people."

Craig next starred in a third Benoit Blanc film titled Wake Up Dead Man, with Johnson directing again.

== Charity and humanitarian work ==
In 2007, Craig and British Prime Minister Tony Blair took part in the United Kingdom's Comic Relief charity fundraiser, ultimately raising more than US$90 million. Craig made a cameo appearance as himself in a sketch with Catherine Tate who appeared in the guise of her character Elaine Figgis from The Catherine Tate Show, for the BBC Red Nose Day 2007 fundraising programme. Craig participated in the Broadway Cares/Equity Fights AIDS fundraising 8 December 2009, raising US$1,549,953 in the 21st annual Gypsy of the Year competition, from six weeks of curtain appeals at their hit Broadway drama, A Steady Rain. Craig starred in 2011 in a short film narrated by Judi Dench, which was produced for International Women's Day. The next year, Craig worked with Orbis International in Mongolia to raise support and awareness of the Orbis medical team and their Flying Eye Hospital.

He is involved with multiple charities including S.A.F.E. Kenya, which uses street theatre to address social issues. He is also involved with the Opportunity Network, which provides access to education for low-income students in New York. In 2011, he collaborated with Dame Judi Dench to highlight gender inequality for International Women's Day. In August 2014, he added his name to a letter to British broadcasters calling for better representation of ethnic minorities. In 2015, Craig appeared in the film Comic Relief: Behind the Bond for the BBC Red Nose Day 2015 fundraising programme.

In April 2015, the United Nations appointed Craig the first global advocate for the elimination of mines and explosive hazards. The role involves raising awareness for the UN Mine Action Service (UNMAS), and political and financial support for the cause. Former UN Secretary-General Ban Ki-moon told Craig: "You have been given a licence to kill, I'm now giving you a licence to save." In 2019, Craig appeared in a video with the Secretary-General of the United Nations, António Guterres, and launched the UNMAS Safe Ground campaign to turn minefields into playing fields.

== Political views ==
In 2012, Craig expressed a dislike and distrust for politics and politicians in general, being quoted as saying, "Politicians are shitheads. That's how they become politicians, even the good ones. We're actors, we're artists, we're very nice to each other. They'll turn around and stab you in the fucking back". He was particularly scathing about former Labour Party prime minister Tony Blair, comparing the friends of Blair with the Faustian protagonist of Klaus Mann's novel Mephisto. Craig has also expressed a reluctance to involve himself with politicians, arguing that by doing so "you immediately are aligning yourself with a political party."

Despite this, Craig supported Barack Obama in the 2008 and 2012 US presidential elections. He was outspoken about his opposition to Brexit before the 2016 EU membership referendum. In 2016, he was pictured wearing a "Vote Remain" t-shirt which was adorned with the words, "No man is an island. No country by itself."

Craig came out against the concept of inheritance in 2021, calling it "distasteful". He has said his philosophy is "get rid of it or give it away before you go".

== Personal life ==
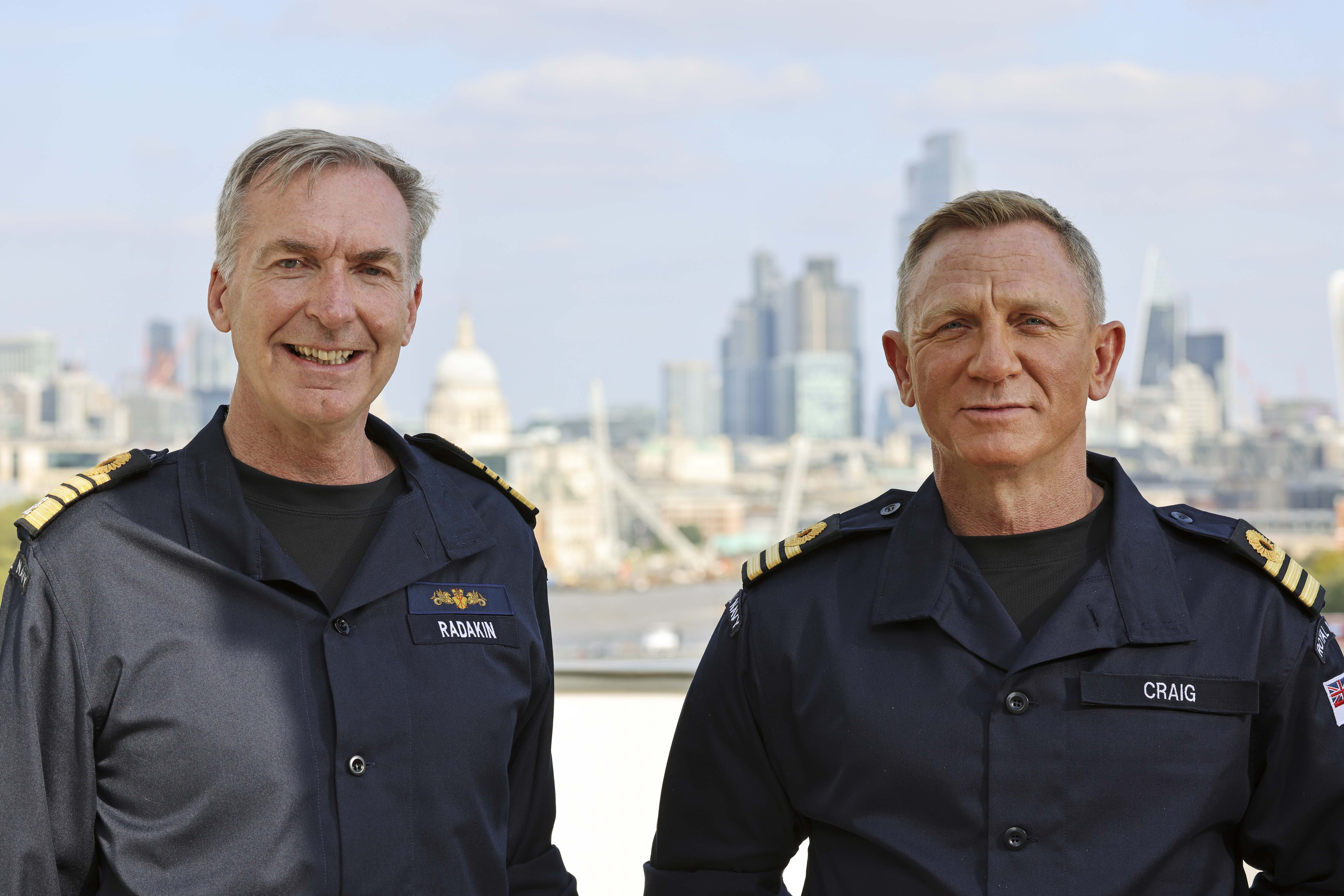
Admiral Sir Tony Radakin and Commander Daniel Craig, following Craig's appointment to the honorary Royal Navy rank of Commander in September 2021

In 1992, Craig married actress Fiona Loudon; they had a daughter, Ella, before divorcing in 1994. Ella Loudon is an actress and model who has publicly expressed pride in Craig's work.

Craig later began a relationship with German actress Heike Makatsch that lasted for seven years until 2004. He subsequently dated film producer Satsuki Mitchell. They were engaged from 2007 till November 2010.

Craig's friend Mark Strong speaks fluent German, and in 1997 provided the German dubbing for Craig's voice in Obsession when "German with an English accent" was required. Strong and Craig previously lived together, became friends, and co-starred in the BBC drama Our Friends in the North. Craig is also the godfather of Strong's son Roman.

Craig and actress Rachel Weisz had known each other since working together on Les Grandes Horizontales (1994). They began dating in December 2010, and were married in a private ceremony in New York City on 22 June 2011 with only four guests in attendance, including Craig's daughter and Weisz's son. It was reported on 1 September 2018 that their first child together, a daughter, had been born.

In January 2018, Craig purchased a house in Brooklyn for an amount in excess of US$6 million. He is a lifelong fan of Liverpool F.C., and is also a fan of rugby, having travelled to Australia in 2013 to watch the British and Irish Lions tour. In 2019, Craig announced he had obtained American citizenship. (Note: In a video for Variety, he mentioned he actually became an American citizen in 2016. 2019 is the year the media reports based on a quote he made while promoting Knives Out that year.) He was made an honorary Commander in the Royal Navy in September 2021, matching the on-screen rank of James Bond. Craig was appointed Companion of the Order of St Michael and St George (CMG) in the 2022 New Year Honours for services to film and theatre, matching the CMG of James Bond.

== Filmography ==
Key
†	Denotes films that have not yet been released

=== Film ===
Year	Title	Role	Notes	Ref.
1992	The Power of One	Sergeant Jaapie Botha		
1995	A Kid in King Arthur's Court	Master Kane		
1997	Obsession	John McHale		
1998	Love and Rage	James Lynchehaun		
1998	Elizabeth	John Ballard		
1998	Love Is the Devil: Study for a Portrait of Francis Bacon	George Dyer		
1999	The Trench	Sergeant Telford Winter		
2000	Some Voices	Ray		
2000	Hotel Splendide	Ronald Blanche		
2000	I Dreamed of Africa	Declan Fielding		
2001	Lara Croft: Tomb Raider	Alex West		
2002	Ten Minutes Older: The Cello	Cecil Thomas		
2002	Road to Perdition	Connor Rooney		
2002	Occasional, Strong	Jim	Short	
2003	Sylvia	Ted Hughes		
2003	The Mother	Darren		
2004	Layer Cake	XXXX		
2004	Enduring Love	Joe		
2005	The Jacket	Rudy Mackenzie		
2005	Fateless	American Soldier		
2005	Munich	Steve		
2006	Renaissance	Barthélémy Karas	Voice	
2006	Infamous	Perry Edward Smith		
2006	Casino Royale	James Bond		
2007	The Invasion	Ben Driscoll		
2007	The Golden Compass	Lord Asriel		
2008	Flashbacks of a Fool	Joe Scot	Also executive producer	
2008	Quantum of Solace	James Bond		
2008	Defiance	Tuvia Bielski		
2008	How to Lose Friends & Alienate People	Himself	Cameo	
2011	One Life	Narrator	Voice; documentary	
2011	Cowboys & Aliens	Jake Lonergan		
2011	Dream House	Will Atenton / Peter Ward		
2011	The Adventures of Tintin	Ivan Ivanovitch Sakharine / Red Rackham	Motion capture	
2011	The Girl with the Dragon Tattoo	Mikael Blomkvist		
2011	The Organ Grinder's Monkey	Bubbles	Short	
2012	Happy & Glorious	James Bond	Short	
2012	Skyfall	James Bond		
2015	Spectre	James Bond	Also co-producer	
2015	Star Wars: The Force Awakens	Stormtrooper FN-1824	Uncredited cameo	
2017	Logan Lucky	Joe Bang		
2017	Kings	Obie Hardison		
2019	Knives Out	Detective Benoit Blanc		
2021	No Time to Die	James Bond	Also co-producer	
2022	Glass Onion	Detective Benoit Blanc		
2024	Queer	William Lee		
2025	Wake Up Dead Man	Detective Benoit Blanc		
2027	Narnia: The Magician's Nephew †	Andrew Ketterley	Post-production	
TBA	Untitled Damien Chazelle film †	TBA	Post-production	

=== Television ===
Year	Title	Role	Notes	Ref.
1992	Anglo-Saxon Attitudes	Gilbert Stokesay	3 episodes	
1992	Boon	Jim Parham	1 episode	
1992	Covington Cross	Walkway guard	1 episode	
1993	Zorro	Lieutenant Hidalgo	2 episodes	
1993	Drop the Dead Donkey	Fixx	Episode: "George and His Daughter"	
1993	The Young Indiana Jones Chronicles	Schiller	Episode: "Palestine, October 1917"	
1993	Between the Lines	Joe Rance	Episode: "New Order"	
1993	Heartbeat	Peter Begg	Episode: "A Chilly Reception"	
1993	Screen Two	Lt. Guth	Episode: "Genghis Cohn"	
1993	Sharpe's Eagle	Lt. Berry	Television film	
1996	Our Friends in the North	Geordie Peacock	8 episodes	
1996	Tales from the Crypt	Barry	Episode: "Smoke Wrings"	
1996	Saint-Ex	Guillaumet	Television film	
1996	Kiss and Tell	Matt Kearney	Television film	
1996	The Fortunes and Misfortunes of Moll Flanders	James "Jemmy" Seagrave	Television film	
1997	The Hunger	Jerry Pritchard	Episode: "Ménage à Trois"	
1997	The Ice House	DS Andy McLoughlin	Television film	
1999	Shockers: The Visitor	Richard	Television film	
2001	Sword of Honour	Guy Crouchback	Television film	
2002	Copenhagen	Werner Heisenberg	Television film	
2005	Archangel	Prof. Fluke Kelso	Television film	
2012–2021	Saturday Night Live	Himself / various	2 episodes as host, 1 episode as guest	
2017	Comrade Detective	Father Anton Streza	Voice; 2 episodes	

=== Theatre ===
Year	Title	Role	Theatre	Ref.
1993	Angels in America	Joe Pitt	Royal National Theatre, London	
1994	The Rover	Blunt	Women's Playhouse Trust, London	
1994	Les Grandes Horizontales	Performer	National Theatre Studio, London	
1997	Hurlyburly	Mickey	The Old Vic, London	
2002	A Number	Bernard 1 & 2 / Michael Black	Royal Court, London	
2009	A Steady Rain	Joey	Gerald Schoenfeld Theatre, Broadway	
2013	Betrayal	Robert	Ethel Barrymore Theatre, Broadway	
2016	Othello	Iago	New York Theatre Workshop, Off-Broadway	
2022	Macbeth	Macbeth	Longacre Theatre, Broadway	

=== Video games ===
Year	Title	Voice role	Ref.
2008	007: Quantum of Solace	James Bond	
2010	GoldenEye 007	James Bond	
2010	James Bond 007: Blood Stone	James Bond	

=== Commercials ===
Year	Title	Role	Ref.
2012	Heineken Crack the Case	James Bond	
2012	Sony Mouse & Cat	James Bond	
2015	Heineken The Chase	James Bond	
2020	Heineken Daniel Craig vs James Bond	James Bond / Himself	
2022	Belvedere Vodka Presents Daniel Craig	Himself	

== See also ==
- Outline of James Bond

Preceded by Pierce Brosnan	Actor of James Bond; 2005–2026	Succeeded by Robert Pattinson
