= Chicago Dramatists =

Theatre in Chicago, Illinois, US

Chicago Dramatists is a theatre in River West, West Town, Chicago, Illinois, US, focused on nurturing playwrights and developing new plays. It was founded in 1979 by Russ Tutterow and is notable for its Network Playwright Program, which offers classes, readings and critiques to writers of all abilities, and readings of new works for the general public. In 1998, the theatre received a special Jeff Award for its almost two decades of developing plays and playwrights in a manner that has enhanced Chicago's reputation for being a cradle for new theatre works. The theater space itself is small and intimate, seating 77.

As well as nurturing new playwrights, Chicago Dramatists lists many established playwrights as part of its community. Resident playwrights have included Keith Huff (whose award-winning play A Steady Rain was developed at Chicago Dramatists), Lydia R. Diamond, Kristiana Rae Colón, Sandra Delgado and Mary Ruth Clarke. The current artistic director is Carson Becker.

== Notable productions ==
- The Angel of Lemnos by resident playwright Jim Henry (1999 Joseph Jefferson Award for outstanding New Work)
- The Liquid Moon by resident playwright John Green (2002 Joseph Jefferson Award for outstanding New Work)
- Only the Sound by resident playwright Jenny Laird (2003 Joseph Jefferson Award for outstanding New Work)
- Voyeurs de Venus by resident playwright Lydia R. Diamond (2006 Joseph Jefferson Award for outstanding New Work)
- A Steady Rain by resident playwright Keith Huff (2008 Joseph Jefferson Awards for outstanding New Work and an outstanding Midsize Production Play)

== See also ==
- Theater in Chicago
- List of museums and cultural institutions in Chicago
