= Some Voices (film) =

2000 film by Simon Cellan Jones

- Theatrical release poster
- Directed by: Simon Cellan Jones
- Written by: Joe Penhall
- Based on: Some Voices by Joe Penhall
- Produced by: Damian Jones; Graham Broadbent
- Starring: Daniel Craig; Kelly Macdonald; David Morrissey; Julie Graham; Peter McDonald
- Cinematography: David Odd
- Edited by: Elen Pierce Lewis
- Music by: Adrian Johnston
- Distributed by: FilmFour Distributors
- Release date: 25 August 2000 (United Kingdom)
- Running time: 95 min.
- Country: United Kingdom
- Language: English
- Box office: $9,188

Some Voices is a 2000 British drama film directed by Simon Cellan Jones and adapted for the screen by Joe Penhall, from his own stage play (originally a production for the Royal Court Theatre, London). It is Cellan Jones's first feature film. The film was almost entirely shot on location in Shepherd's Bush, West London, where Cellan Jones lives.

== Plot ==
The story begins with the film's central character, Ray (Daniel Craig), being picked up from a psychiatric hospital where he was receiving treatment for schizophrenia by devoted brother Pete (David Morrissey), with whom Ray will be living in his West London flat. Pete works long hours as a chef in a café (a traditional "greasy spoon" during the day and a trendy eatery in the evening) he inherited from his father, and now has the challenge of not only managing the cafe, but looking out for Ray and monitoring his medication.

Despite his condition Ray is an intelligent, out-going young man. He soon falls for Laura (Kelly Macdonald), a Glaswegian girl in the midst of breaking up with her abusive boyfriend (Peter McDonald). Laura becomes attracted to Ray because of his spontaneity and his childlike sense of fun. Around this time, Pete also becomes involved in a relationship with Mandy (Julie Graham).

As Ray's relationship blossoms his relationship with the medication he takes begins to change; he prefers to trust in the soothing properties of love, and eventually stops taking it. Over time, this decision has disastrous effects on all three relationships: that of the two brothers; Ray and Laura; and Pete and Mandy. Ray may cause disruption, concern and distress to those close to him but that is only a fraction of the distress his condition causes him. In the end, it is the relationship between the brothers that is central to the film. Pete is long-suffering but, despite all his frustration and resentment, his loving commitment keeps his brother from serious harm.

== Cast ==
- Daniel Craig – Ray
- Kelly Macdonald – Laura
- David Morrissey – Pete
- Julie Graham – Mandy
- Peter McDonald – Dave
- Nicholas Palliser – Friend
- Edward Tudor-Pole - Lighter seller
- Ashley Walters - Kitchen Hand (dishwasher)
- Cate Fowler – Benefits Agency Woman

== Music ==
The film featured various songs including:

- "Speed of the Sound of Loneliness" – Alabama 3
- "Rake It In" – Imogen Heap
- "This Is the Tempo" - Grand Theft Auto
- "54-46 Was My Number" – Toots and the Maytals
- "Goodbye Girl" – Squeeze
- "Il ragazzo della Via Gluck" (French version "La Maison ou j'ai grandi)" - Françoise Hardy

== Production ==
Filming locations include: 306 Uxbridge Road, London (Pete's Cafe), 51 Goldhawk Road, London (Laura's home), Hastings, East Sussex (beach holiday).

== Release ==
Some Voices premiered during the Directors' Fortnight at the 2000 Cannes Film Festival. It was released in UK theaters on 25 August 2000.

=== Critical response ===
The film has a rating of 40% based on 5 reviews on review aggregate site Rotten Tomatoes. Though the film garnered mixed reviews, praise for the cast was unanimous. Mark Wyman of Film Review said the film "showcases some terrific British talent", while Total Film commended Cellan Jones in his ability to "draw intelligent, effective turns from his cast – Daniel Craig and David Morrissey are excellent". Time Out wrote "Morrissey skillfully registers abiding filial love tested by simmering exasperation; MacDonald's adept at lippy on top, vulnerable underneath; and Craig's vibrant yet haunted expressiveness tells us everything needful about this doomed sweetheart".

Critics were divided over the film's visual effects and production design. Channel 4, which called the film "one of the best British films of 2000", said the director's vision of west London's "tower blocks, dual-carriageways and crowded streets" captured the central character's disintegrating mental state. The film's sound and visuals as Ray stops taking his medication were singled out as "a clever and mammothly effective technique, communicating not just the strangeness of what's happening to Ray, but also the sheer terror of it".

Conversely, Time Out described these same effects as "over-egging it somewhat", and stated the "whirling camera effects and freaky sound mix" became somewhat tedious. William Thomas of Empire compared the film negatively to the stage play, saying the story "probably brought the house down on stage, but on film, it's simply static". Total Film agreed, writing, "Perhaps it's the quirky, jerky This Life camerawork or the dim, grainy film stock, but Some Voices never reaches out and grabs the audience, remaining a watch rather than an experience".

Writing for the Student BMJ (a medical journal for students and junior doctors), Peter Byrne praised the film for "its avoidance of the standard formulas [about mental illness and schizophrenia]. Gone are the psycho-killer, pathetic, or 'crazy funny guy' stereotypes... There is no blaming, no mental illness as metaphor, no psychiatry bashing, and – although a romance lies at its core – there is none of the usual message that 'love is better than tablets'". Byrne further stated that in Some Voices, "the schizophrenic is not demonised as a potential criminal or as a care-in-the-community basket-case", and "Ray's essential humanity is transcribed with sympathy and warmth, and so is the patience and perseverance of Pete, who must shoulder most of the burden of schizophrenia's terrible mystery".

== Awards ==
=== Wins ===
- British Independent Film Award for Best Actor (Daniel Craig)
- Dinard British Film Festival Award for Best Cinematography (David Odd)

=== Nominations ===
- BAFTA Award for Outstanding Debut by a British Writer, Director, or Producer (Simon Cellan Jones)
- European Film Award for European Discovery (Simon Cellan Jones)
- Dinard British Film Festival Golden Hitchcock Award (Simon Cellan Jones)
