= Sherwin B. Nuland =

American surgeon and writer (1930–2014)

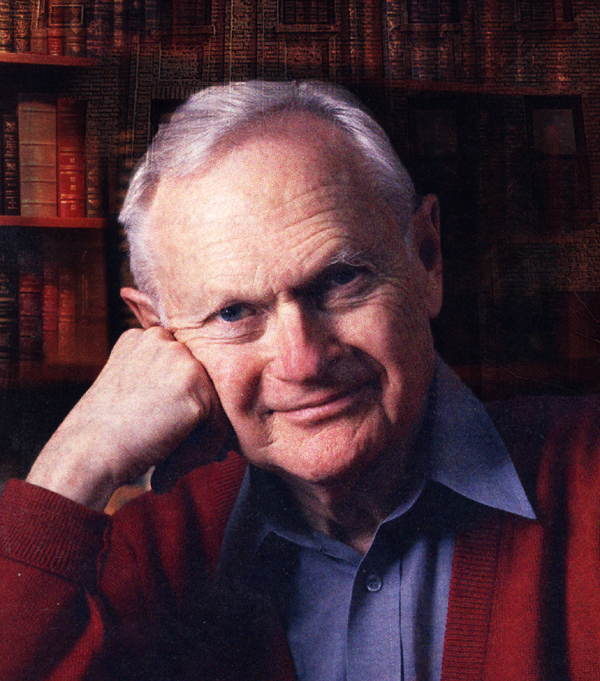
- Born: Shepsel Ber Nudelman; December 8, 1930; New York City, U.S.
- Died: March 3, 2014 (aged 83); Hamden, Connecticut, U.S.
- Education: Bronx High School of Science; New York University; Yale School of Medicine
- Known for: How We Die: Reflections on Life's Final Chapter
- Spouses: Rhona L. Goulston (divorced); Sarah Peterson (m. 1977)
- Children: 4, including Victoria
- Awards: 1994 National Book Award
- Scientific career
- Fields: Surgeon, writer, educator
- Workplaces: Yale School of Medicine

Sherwin Bernard Nuland (born Shepsel Ber Nudelman; December 8, 1930 – March 3, 2014) was an American surgeon and writer who taught bioethics, history of medicine, and medicine at the Yale School of Medicine, and occasionally bioethics and history of medicine at Yale College. His 1994 book How We Die: Reflections on Life's Final Chapter was a New York Times Best Seller and won the National Book Award for Nonfiction, as well as being a finalist for the Pulitzer Prize.

In 2011 Nuland was awarded the Jonathan Rhoads Gold Medal of the American Philosophical Society, for “Distinguished Service to Medicine.”

Nuland wrote non-academic articles for The New Yorker, The New York Times, The New Republic, Time, MIT Technology Review and the New York Review of Books. He was a fellow of the Hastings Center, an independent bioethics research institution.

He is the father of Victoria Nuland, who served as under secretary of State for Political Affairs from 2021 to 2024.

== Biography ==
Nuland was born Shepsel Ber Nudelman in The Bronx, New York City, on December 8, 1930, to Jewish immigrant parents, Meyer Nudelman, a Moldovan Jewish garment repairman, 1889–1958 and Vitsche Lutsky, a Belarusian Jew, 1893–1941.

Although raised in a traditional Orthodox Jewish home, he came to consider himself agnostic, but continued to attend synagogue. As a Jew, he witnessed anti-Semitic discrimination against his cousin and changed his name when he applied to college to ensure admittance.

Nuland was a graduate of The Bronx High School of Science, New York University and Yale School of Medicine, where he obtained his M.D. degree and also completed a residency in surgery.

At the time of his death, he was living in Connecticut with his second wife, Sarah Nuland (née Peterson). He had four children, two from each marriage. His daughter Victoria Nuland, a career foreign service officer, served as the under secretary of State for Political Affairs from May 2021 to March 2024.

Dr. Nuland avowed a "unique relationship" with death. The 1994 National Book Award for nonfiction was granted to his How We Die: Reflections on Life’s Final Chapter.

In a 2001 TED talk, which was released in October 2007, Nuland spoke of his severe depression and obsessive thoughts in the early 1970s, probably caused by his difficult childhood and the dissolution of his first marriage.

As drug therapy remained ineffective, a lobotomy was suggested, but his treating resident suggested electroshock therapy instead, which led to his recovery. Twelve years after the talk, TED's Curator, Chris Anderson, recalled that Nuland's talk "remains one of the most powerful moments in the conference’s history."

Nuland was also one of the featured lecturers at One Day University.

In 2005, Nuland taught a series of lectures for the Teaching Company's The Great Courses on the history of Western medicine titled Doctors: The History of Scientific Medicine Revealed Through Biography.

Nuland died on March 3, 2014, at his home in Hamden, Connecticut, of prostate cancer.

== Books ==
- Doctors: The Biography of Medicine (New York: Knopf, 1988) ISBN 0-679-76009-1
- Medicine: The Art of Healing (New York: Hugh Lauter Levin Associates, Inc. Distributed by Macmillan, 1992) ISBN 0-88363-292-6
- How We Die: Reflections on Life's Final Chapter (New York: Knopf: Distributed by Random House, 1994) ISBN 0-679-41461-4
- The Wisdom of the Body (New York: Knopf, 1997) ISBN 0-679-44407-6
- How We Live (New York: Vintage Books, 1998) [originally published as The Wisdom of the Body in 1997] ISBN 0-09-976761-9
- Leonardo Da Vinci (Penguin Lives) (New York: Viking, 2000) ISBN 0-670-89391-9
- The Mysteries Within: A Surgeon Explores Myth, Medicine, and the Human Body (New York: Simon & Schuster, 2000) ISBN 0-684-85486-4
- The Doctors' Plague: Germs, Childbed Fever and the Strange Story of Ignac Semmelweis (New York: W.W. Norton, 2003) ISBN 0-393-05299-0
- Lost in America: A Journey with My Father (New York: Knopf: Distributed by Random House, 2003) ISBN 0-375-41294-8
- Maimonides (Jewish Encounters) (New York: Nextbook: Schocken, 2005) ISBN 0-8052-4200-7
- The Art of Aging: A Doctor's Prescription for Well-Being (New York: Random House, 2007) ISBN 1-4000-6477-5
- The Uncertain Art: Thoughts on a Life in Medicine (New York: Random House, 2008) ISBN 1-4000-6478-3
- The Soul of Medicine: Tales from the Bedside (New York: Kaplan Publishing, 2009) ISBN 1-60714-055-1
