= Benoit Blanc =

- 'Knives Out' character
- First appearance: Knives Out (2019)
- Last appearance: Wake Up Dead Man: A Knives Out Mystery (2025)
- Created by: Rian Johnson
- Portrayed by: Daniel Craig

In-universe information
- Occupation: Private detective
- Nationality: American

Benoit Blanc is a fictional detective character created by the movie director Rian Johnson and played by actor Daniel Craig. Benoit Blanc is the main character of the Knives Out movie franchise. His investigation has been portrayed in the movies Knives Out (2019), Glass Onion: A Knives Out Mystery (2022) and Wake Up Dead Man: A Knives Out Mystery, which was released on Netflix on December 12, 2025. Benoit is the only recurring character in all the movies and frequently serves as a secondary lead helping out the hero of each movie.

Blanc is an unusual, flamboyant detective who speaks with a thick Southern accent. In Knives Out promotional materials, Blanc is described as "The Last of the Gentlemen Sleuths," an individual following in the footsteps of other oddball detectives like Poirot and Sherlock Holmes. Johnson created the character after Hercule Poirot from Agatha Christie, presenting him as a modern update of a classic literary detective. Craig's performance has received much critical acclaim and earned him two Golden Globe nominations. The popularity of the character convinced Netflix to buy two sequels, which was one of the biggest film deals ever done through streaming.

== Appearances ==
=== Knives Out (2019) ===
In the first movie, Blanc is entangled in the mystery of the death of a famous crime writer for whom he tries to find out what led to his demise. The police think that Harlan Thrombey committed suicide, while Blanc was hired anonymously to investigate the incident. When Harlan’s daughter, Linda, questions him about who hired him, Blanc refuses to disclose this information and pledges that he will be “a respectful, quiet, passive observer of the truth.” During the process of investigating, Blanc develops a relationship with the nurse of Harlan, Marta Cabrera, whose one flaw is that she cannot lie since it makes her vomit. Blanc later on uncovers that Ransom Drysdale, Harlan’s grandson, not only hired him, but the whole scheme to kill Harlan was planned by him.

=== Glass Onion: A Knives Out Mystery (2022) ===
In the sequel, Blanc attends a luxurious "murder mystery party" hosted by the tech tycoon Miles Bron (Edward Norton) on his own private island in Greece. At the beginning of the movie, the COVID-19 pandemic is taking place, and Blanc feels frustrated because he does not have anything to do. One of the scenes shows how Grant’s character knocks at Blanc’s bathroom door to inform him about the arrival of a package. This scene also shows Blanc speaking in a video call with celebrities. Later, Craig mentioned that this was the last film appearance of Angela Lansbury.

Blanc is discovered to have been operating together with Helen Brand, a woman disguised as her dead sister Andi, in an attempt to find the person who killed her sister. Craig delivers his accent even more exaggeratedly in Glass Onion, and it proves to be part of a plan unveiled towards the end of the movie. The identity of the killer of Andi and Duke Cody is finally revealed by Blanc as Bron.

=== Wake Up Dead Man: A Knives Out Mystery (2025) ===
In the third movie, Detective Mike Blanc solves the mysterious death of a monsignor (Josh Brolin), who dies in the middle of church services. The setting of the movie is amongst a group of disgruntled Catholics in upstate New York. The main character of the movie is Father Jud Duplenticy (Josh O’Connor), an ex-boxer who converted to Catholicism and became a priest. Chief of the local police force is Geraldine Scott (Mila Kunis).

There is a definite departure from the previous films in the structure of this film. Blanc doesn’t show up until 40 minutes into the movie, and it is O’Connor who plays the part of Jud, carrying the movie and narrating it. A large part of the movie deals with the open skepticism about religion held by Blanc. A critic once mentioned how the crowd cheered during Blanc’s denunciation of the church before he was through with his speech.

== Characterization ==
=== Personality and Mannerisms ===
Blanc is shown as a verbose, theatrical, and outwardly self-deprecating person who usually conceals his deductive prowess behind long-winded lectures. In Knives Out, he gives a lengthy, absurdly ridiculous analogy where he compares the shape of the case to that of a doughnut. While Johnson and Craig have offered some details about the life of Blanc, they remain few. There have been passing mentions of a tennis star, a ballerina, and the Kentucky Derby in the earlier cases solved by Blanc. Blanc has been featured in The New Yorker magazine and in The View TV show. He hates playing the board game called Clue and adores musical theatre.

The ambiguity here is intentional. Johnson has noted his liking of keeping his detectives mysterious, saying “it pointedly doesn’t work when you start delving into backstory with the detective.” He has also mentioned the need for him to avoid the temptation of seeing Blanc as the most fascinating element of his movies because of Craig’s presence. Blanc has been likened by Craig to Peter Ustinov’s Poirot from Death on the Nile and Evil Under the Sun, who comes from some glamorous place and goes away in the end. Craig sees the detective being an outsider to everyone else because he suspects everyone.

=== Accent ===
The Southern accent of Blanc is perhaps the most identifiable attribute of Blanc. In “Knives Out,” Ransom parodies the accent as “a Kentucky Fried Foghorn Leghorn drawl.” According to Johnson, the first draft required just a touch of Southern accent, however, Craig, inspired by Tennessee Williams and Shelby Foote, made him go far beyond. Craig aimed at imitating the soothing voice of Foote to distinguish the detective from his wealthy Yankee opponents.

According to Johnson, all he asked of them was to create an accent that sounded good. Johnson agreed with Craig on a voice, which is based on Foote, the historian featured in Ken Burns’s films, and whose Mississippi accent he called “a very honeyed accent.” When asked where Blanc was from, Johnson replied, “I think we can assume he is from Mississippi,” although he hasn’t planned any background story yet. In one interview, Johnson stated that what they ended up with was “Shelby Foote through Foghorn Leghorn.” According to Craig, what he feared the most was accent pastiche. He referred to Gene Wilder’s technique of comedy.

=== Sexuality and Personal Life ===
During a London Film Festival press conference held in October 2022, Johnson was asked if the scene featuring Blanc having a relationship with another person indicated that the character was gay. Johnson responded that “Yes, he obviously is.” According to Johnson, making Blanc gay was an obvious choice for the sequel after what happened in the previous movie. Johnson added that he could not think of anyone else who could bring him more happiness in a romantic relationship than Grant.

=== Religious Views ===
In Wake Up Dead Man, religious themes take up much of the storyline, and Johnson and Craig collaborated in refining Blanc’s views on religion. According to critics, scenes in the film involving the conversations of Jud and Blanc were presented as discussions of a faithful priest with an atheist detective. Several critics observed that the film doesn’t have any scorn for Blanc. It was said that “Blanc might be a proud heretic, but I don’t think Johnson is”.

== Development ==
=== Creation and Naming ===
The first name was chosen based on his French tutor who went by the name Benoit. The family name was selected because Johnson felt that Americans would have trouble pronouncing it just as they would the name Poirot. He states that he did most of the writing for Blanc in terms of the character’s purpose, but Craig provided the humor.

=== Casting ===
The part almost did not work out for Craig. He could not accept it at first, since he was working on the making of the movie No Time To Die starring James Bond, but eventually a three-month delay on that project gave Craig enough time to take on Knives Out, and filming of this movie started five weeks after that. According to Johnson himself, Daniel Craig was his first choice for this movie. Craig describes how thrilled he felt when reading the script.

=== Performance ===
The character was developed through the use of inspiration from Monsieur Hulot of Jacques Tati who was debonair but clumsy, as well as Cary Grant of To Catch a Thief. Craig read old books containing phrases used in the Southern part of America. A number of lines attributed to Blanc were improvised by Craig. Craig invented the line “Halle Berry” when performing in the play Glass Onion by using a phrase from a member of his bodyguards, and the line “Scooby Dooby Doo” in Wake Up Dead Man is also from Craig.

=== Franchise ===
Johnson had already been working on writing a new movie for Blanc, but that would not happen, Lionsgate revealed in February 2020. Instead, the movies would go to Netflix, who paid $469 million to Johnson and his partner, Ram Bergman. The sources claimed that each person in the deal was going to earn more than $100 million. The contract offered Johnson a lot of creative freedom, except that it included two conditions – Craig had to play in the movies and they had to have the minimum budget of the original ($40 million).

Johnson has ruled out the possibility of the films being conventional sequels, saying that their style is “just what Agatha Christie did.” According to him, every movie is a case with different suspects, mysteries, and Detective Blanc who solves it. He also stated that neither he nor Craig intended to create any intellectual property, but getting into three movies was almost an accident. The third film has been announced through a trailer where Blanc claims that “my most dangerous case yet is about to be revealed.”

== Reception ==
=== Critical Response ===
The performance of Craig in Knives Out received great critical acclaim. According to Brian Tallerico of RogerEbert.com, Craig made the Southern accent and big ego of his character immediately iconic. The review by JoBlo suggests that Blanc may be another franchise character for Craig.

Many critics felt that Glass Onion was a stronger display yet. The Slashfilm review contended that this was Craig’s finest performance, stating, “Forget James Bond – this was the role Craig was born to play.” The critical consensus on Rotten Tomatoes attributed the film’s success to its revival of Blanc and its ensemble cast.

Wake Up Dead Man got some excellent reviews regarding how deep the character still is. The critics stated that while Craig plays the character in the conventions of the genre, the color he puts on Blanc is what makes it all happen. One of the reviews even mentioned that Craig feels comfortable in his role. Others noticed that Blanc gets more space in the third film.

=== Sexuality ===
It was widely received well by many of his fans and the LGBTQ community. His fans appreciated Johnson for featuring Grant in just one scene to establish Blanc’s homosexuality. An article written by Stylist described Blanc as being the type of gay male hero needed in a mystery story and that the film purposely steered away from stereotypes in its representation of him.

=== Accolades ===
In 2020 and 2023, Craig was nominated for the Golden Globe Award for Best Actor in a Motion Picture – Musical or Comedy for his roles in the movies Knives Out and Glass Onion, respectively. Wake Up Dead Man had no nominations in the Golden Globes of 2026.

=== Future ===
However, the agreement with Netflix did include only two sequels, and hence a fourth movie would have to be negotiated separately. While a fourth movie hasn’t been announced yet, Johnson stated in an Entertainment Weekly interview conducted in December 2025 that he intended to continue the series. Days after the third movie’s release, Johnson said that he had some elementary ideas for a fourth film. Since Johnson intends to make a different movie before continuing with another Blanc mystery, this is expected in several years time.
