= A Steady Rain =

Play by Keith Huff

- Poster for the Broadway production
- Written by: Keith Huff
- Original language: English
- Subject: Two policemen must deal with the circumstances arising from a deadly error in judgment
- Genre: Drama

Premiere
- Date premiered: 2007
- Place premiered: Chicago Dramatists

A Steady Rain is a play by Keith Huff. With a plot similar to a real-life event involving Jeffrey Dahmer, it focuses on two Chicago policemen who inadvertently return Konerak Sinthasomphone, the 14 year old Laotian immigrant, to Dahmer - the cannibalistic serial killer who claims to be the child's uncle. When he later becomes the man's latest victim, the lifelong friendship of the two men is threatened when it becomes clear someone must bear responsibility for their egregious failure to assess the situation accurately. The play alternates between two separate monologues and present-moment dialogue scenes.

Following readings in New York City and Los Angeles, A Steady Rain was staged by Chicago Dramatists in 2007. It opened on Broadway in September 2009.

== Synopsis ==
Chicago police officers Joey and Denny are longtime partners and best friends. Joey is single and lonely, and Denny is married with children, but both men have flaws and serious problems. Denny cares deeply for his family, and that provides the justification for his criminal actions. Introverted Joey struggles with a drinking problem and secretly loves Denny's wife, Connie; angry tough-guy Denny can barely disguise his racism and cheats on Connie with a prostitute on his beat.

The two men offer contrasting descriptions to Internal Affairs interrogators of their harrowing experiences. They relate how Walter Lorenz, a pimp that Denny has harassed over the years, shoots a bullet through Denny's front window, causing the flying glass to sever an artery in Denny's son's neck. Denny pursues Lorenz relentlessly, drawing Joey into a series of dangerous and incriminating activities. During a domestic disturbance call, the two return a frightened Vietnamese boy to a man who says he is the boy's uncle. The uncle turns out to be a cannibalistic serial killer, who eats the boy.

== Productions ==
A Steady Rain initially was produced by Chicago Dramatists in 2007 and then at the Royal George Theatre in Chicago in February 2008. It won the Joseph Jefferson Awards for Best New Work, Best Actor for Randy Steinmeyer, and Best Production.

Following a number of staged and table readings and an off-Broadway workshop production, the play began previews at the Gerald Schoenfeld Theatre on September 10, 2009 and opened officially on September 29. The 12-week engagement closed on December 6. Directed by John Crowley, it starred Hugh Jackman and Daniel Craig, making his Broadway debut. Set and costume design was by Scott Pask, with lighting design by Hugh Vanstone. The producers announced that the show had broken the record for the highest weekly gross of a non-musical production on Broadway, with a weekly gross of $1,167,954 for the week ending September 20, 2009.

== Critical reception ==
In reviewing the original Chicago Dramatists' production, Chris Jones of the Chicago Tribune called the play "a gritty, rich, thick, poetic and entirely gripping noir tale." Hedy Weiss of the Chicago Sun-Times wrote, "Huff provides [the actors] with enough fiery, superbly rendered, often deeply poetic speeches, enough mood shifts, enough emotional cataclysms and action-packed storytelling to keep this hallucinatory roller-coaster ride in motion. I would be happy to see this production again with an audience of real men in blue, just to take the temperature in the room."

Steve Oxman of Variety observed, "Keith Huff's crackerjack two-hander ... turns out to be less like the perpetual drizzle of its title and more like a snowball that builds to an avalanche. While Huff starts with a couple of familiar characters — good cop/bad cop Chicago patrolmen with alcohol and racism issues — he deepens them into complex figures, compellingly human even when at their most despicable. The adroit character development combines with a billowing narrative to deliver some rattling emotional crescendos.... While he could maybe pull back on a contrivance or two, the playwright smartly sticks to his conceit of piling one worse complication on top of another, effectively investing A Steady Rain with genuine dramatic power and a sense of true tragedy."

In his review of the Broadway production, Ben Brantley of The New York Times, who was generally satisfied with the performances of Jackman and, especially, Craig, wrote, "If Mr. Huff has not managed to reweave this premise [childhood friends find themselves on opposite sides of the law and in love with the same woman] with any surprising threads, he has packed it with enough lurid incident to fill a season of Law & Order."

Time's Richard Zoglin, naming it one of the Top 10 Plays of 2009 and ranking it at #2, commented that "Casting a couple of big movie stars in a Broadway play can cut both ways. Audiences may stand in line for tickets, but critics can put on their scowling "show-me" faces — as many did for Keith Huff's one-act play, which cast Daniel Craig and Hugh Jackman as a pair of Chicago cops in crisis. Both stars were excellent, but they were wonderfully served by Huff's taut, tough-minded script, which takes potentially clichéd material — the moral challenges faced by cops on the urban mean streets — and makes it fresh and compelling."

=== Reviews ===
"Jackman allows you to feel both the warmth and the tyranny of Denny's love. A taller presence than Craig, he takes up more stage space physically and theatrically, which is just how it should be, given the way his character swaggers like the king of his own limited universe." — Los Angeles Times

"Jackman does an excellent job playing a man who heedlessly jumps the median between superego and id, in the best tradition of the self-mythologizing American sociopath. The erstwhile X-man has never spelled danger, with or without muttonchops." — New York

"Under John Crowley's direction, the two stars present the increasingly far-fetched tale with an amiable diffidence that lets them show you their acting ability, as each gets into his character's moments of personal pain, while carefully keeping the sordid events at a distance [...] Jackman, with his wonderful easy fluidity, shows once again that he's a natural-born stage star." — The Village Voice
