= Knives Out (film series) =

Mystery film series

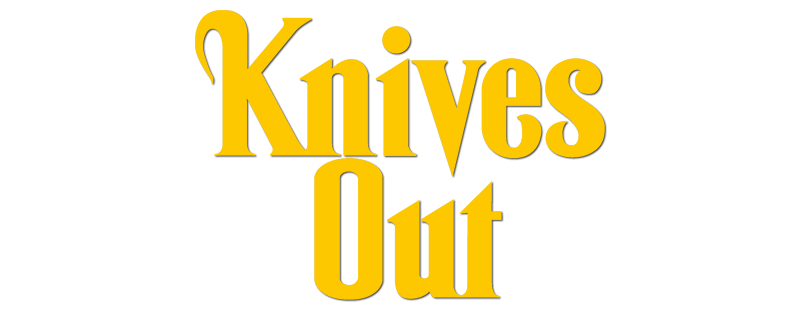
- Official film series logo
- Directed by: Rian Johnson
- Written by: Rian Johnson
- Produced by: Rian Johnson; Ram Bergman
- Starring: Daniel Craig; Various actors (See below)
- Cinematography: Steve Yedlin
- Edited by: Bob Ducsay
- Music by: Nathan Johnson
- Production companies: T-Street Productions; MRC (1)
- Distributed by: Lionsgate Films (1); Netflix (2–3)
- Release dates: November 27, 2019 (1); November 23, 2022 (2); November 26, 2025 (3)
- Country: United States
- Language: English
- Budget: $120,000,000 (3 films)
- Box office: $327,898,746 (2 films)

Knives Out is a series of American murder mystery films created by Rian Johnson, who also serves as the writer, director, and co-producer of all films. Beginning in 2019 with Knives Out, each film follows a different group of people involved in a classic whodunnit, with Benoit Blanc (played by Daniel Craig) being the only recurring character across the 3 films. These films include a wide cast of notable actors, including Chris Evans, Ana de Armas, Edward Norton, Janelle Monáe, Josh O'Connor, and Glenn Close among others, with Johnson's closest collaborators Noah Segan and Joseph Gordon-Levitt appearing in small roles and cameos, respectively. Each film in the franchise is named after a song by a rock band from the British Isles: "Knives Out" by Radiohead, "Glass Onion" by the Beatles, and "Wake Up Dead Man" by U2.

All three films received strong positive reception from both critics and audiences, particularly for their screenplays, direction, and acting, grossing for a combined total of $327.8 million worldwide.

== Films ==
Film	U.S. release date	Director	Screenwriter	Producers
Knives Out	November 27, 2019	Rian Johnson	Rian Johnson	Ram Bergman & Rian Johnson
Glass Onion	November 23, 2022	Rian Johnson	Rian Johnson	Ram Bergman & Rian Johnson
Wake Up Dead Man	November 26, 2025	Rian Johnson	Rian Johnson	Ram Bergman & Rian Johnson

=== Knives Out (2019) ===
In developing the film, Johnson cited several classic mystery thrillers and mystery comedies as influences, including The Last of Sheila, Murder on the Orient Express, Something's Afoot, Murder by Death, Death on the Nile, The Private Eyes, The Mirror Crack'd, Evil Under the Sun, Deathtrap, Clue, and Gosford Park. The 1972 version of Sleuth, a favorite "whodunit adjacent" of Johnson's, was also an inspiration, particularly for the setting and set design, including the automaton, Jolly Jack the Sailor. The title was taken from the 2001 Radiohead song "Knives Out"; Johnson, a Radiohead fan, said: "Obviously, the movie has nothing to do with the song ... That turn of phrase has always stuck in my head. And it just seemed like a great title for a murder mystery." The name Harlan Thrombey is taken from a 1981 Choose Your Own Adventure whodunit, Who Killed Harlowe Thrombey?

The film had its world premiere at the 2019 Toronto International Film Festival on September 7, 2019, and was theatrically released in the United States on November 27 by Lionsgate Films. The film received critical acclaim, particularly for its screenplay, direction, and acting. At the 77th Golden Globe Awards, it received three nominations in the Musical or Comedy category, while also receiving Best Original Screenplay nominations at the 73rd British Academy Film Awards and 92nd Academy Awards. It was selected by the American Film Institute and the National Board of Review as one of the top ten films of 2019.

=== Glass Onion (2022) ===
Before the release of Knives Out, Johnson said he would like to create sequels with Benoit Blanc investigating further mysteries, and that he already had an idea for a sequel. In January 2020, Johnson confirmed that he was writing a sequel, intended to focus on Blanc investigating a new mystery. Craig was expected to reprise his role, and acknowledged interest in the project. By February 2020, Lionsgate announced that a sequel had been officially green-lit for production.

In March 2021, Netflix bought the rights to two Knives Out sequels for $450 million and it was announced that filming would begin in June 2021, in Greece. Despite Lionsgate's prior announcement that they had approved a sequel, reports indicate that Johnson and Bergman retained the sequel rights, which they shopped to other distributors without the involvement of Lionsgate or MRC. In April 2021, Curtis confirmed that the Thrombey family from the first film would not be returning for the sequel, while elaborating on what each family member has been up to since the end of the first installment. The cast was rounded out in May and June 2021, with Dave Bautista, Edward Norton, Janelle Monáe, Kathryn Hahn, Leslie Odom Jr., Kate Hudson, Madelyn Cline and Jessica Henwick added in undisclosed roles.

Principal photography officially commenced on June 28, 2021 in Greece and concluded that September. In June 2022, the official title was revealed to be Glass Onion: A Knives Out Mystery. The film was released on December 23, 2022, with Netflix considering a 45-day theatrical exclusive debut prior to its streaming release.

=== Wake Up Dead Man (2025) ===
In March 2021, it was reported that Netflix had agreed to pay $450 million for the rights to two sequels to be written and directed by Johnson, with Craig reprising his role as detective Benoit Blanc. In June 2022, Johnson revealed that "Knives Out 3" was a working title with his intent being that each film has a distinct title, citing the works of Agatha Christie as his inspiration for the films and the individual titles.

By January 2023, Johnson confirmed that he had started writing the script for the third film, stating that it will be tonally and thematically different from the previous installments. The filmmaker later stated that though he had approved the subtitle of A Knives Out Mystery for the previous installment, he would like to rename the series and add A Benoit Blanc Mystery as subtitles to future installments.

In October 2023, following the adherence to the 2023 Writers Guild of America strike and the resolution thereof, Johnson announced that he had started working on the script for the third film. The filmmaker stated that he has the premise planned, and could begin writing again. In May 2024, the film's official title was announced as Wake Up Dead Man: A Knives Out Mystery with the release of an official teaser trailer narrated by Daniel Craig in character as Benoit Blanc. Principal photography was initially scheduled to commence in fall 2024, in London; though in June of the same year, Johnson announced that filming had commenced. The film was released on December 12, 2025.

=== Future ===
In September 2022, Craig and Johnson both separately stated that they would continue making additional films in the series, as long as they were both involved. In January 2023, the filmmaker acknowledged the realization for a possible Knives Out Christmas special.

In January 2023, in response to the idea of a Knives Out crossover with The Muppets going viral online, Johnson stated that he had considered the idea, but decided that such a film would not work, as the two genres had "different rules" which would not be compatible, and that he would "just want to make a great Muppet movie." In 2025, a brief parody of Knives Out featuring Muppets was released by the children's TV series Sesame Street, without Johnson's involvement.

In October 2025, Johnson stated that he had nothing planned for a fourth film in the series while jokingly asking an interviewer for ideas. The filmmaker acknowledged intentions to continue making Knives Out movies, for as long as he and Craig continue enjoying the filmmaking process. Johnson noted that any future projects depend on the success of the third film. The following month, it was announced that Johnson and Craig were "starting to formulate ideas" for a potential fourth Knives Out film.

== Recurring cast and characters ==
List indicators

This section includes characters who will appear or have appeared in the franchise in main roles.

- An empty grey cell indicates the character was not in the film, or that the character's official presence has not yet been confirmed.
- ^{C} indicates a cameo role.
- ^{P} indicates an appearance in onscreen photographs.
- ^{V} indicates a voice-only role.

Cast	Films and characters		
Cast	Knives Out	Glass Onion	Wake Up Dead Man
Cast	2019	2022	2025
Daniel Craig	Benoit Blanc	Benoit Blanc	Benoit Blanc
Noah Segan	Trooper Wagner	Derol	Nikolai
Joseph Gordon-Levitt	Detective Hardrock^{V}^{C}	Hourly Dong^{V}^{C}	Baseball Announcer^{V}^{C}
Knives Out
Chris Evans	Hugh Ransom Drysdale		
Ana de Armas	Marta Cabrera		
Jamie Lee Curtis	Linda Drysdale		
Michael Shannon	Walt Thrombey		
Don Johnson	Richard Drysdale		
Toni Collette	Joni Thrombey		
LaKeith Stanfield	Lieutenant Elliott		
Christopher Plummer	Harlan Thrombey		
Katherine Langford	Meg Thrombey		
Jaeden Martell	Jacob Thrombey		
Frank Oz	Alan Stevens		
Riki Lindhome	Donna Thrombey		
Edi Patterson	Fran		
K Callan	Wanetta Thrombey		
M. Emmet Walsh	Mr. Proofroc		
Marlene Forte	Mrs. Cabrera		
Glass Onion
Edward Norton		Miles Bron	
Janelle Monáe		Helen Brand	
Janelle Monáe		Andi Brand	
Kathryn Hahn		Claire Debella	
Leslie Odom Jr.		Lionel Toussaint	
Kate Hudson		Birdie Jay	
Dave Bautista		Duke Cody	
Jessica Henwick		Peg	
Madelyn Cline		Whiskey	
Jackie Hoffman		Mrs. Cody	
Dallas Roberts		Devon Debella	
Angela Lansbury		Angela Lansbury	
Natasha Lyonne		Natasha Lyonne	
Kareem Abdul-Jabbar		Kareem Abdul-Jabbar	
Stephen Sondheim		Stephen Sondheim	
Wake Up Dead Man
Josh O'Connor			Rev. Jud Duplenticy
Glenn Close			Martha Delacroix
Josh Brolin			Msgr. Jefferson Wicks
Mila Kunis			Geraldine Scott
Jeremy Renner		Jeremy Renner^{P} (Note: A graphical image of Renner appears in Glass Onion on a bottle of hot sauce sold under a fictitious brand named after him called "Renning Hot!".)	Dr. Nat Sharp
Kerry Washington			Vera Draven
Andrew Scott			Lee Ross
Cailee Spaeny			Simone Vivane
Daryl McCormack			Cy Draven
Thomas Haden Church			Samson Holt
Jeffrey Wright			Langstrom
Annie Hamilton			Grace Wicks
James Faulkner			Rev. Prentice Wicks
Bridget Everett			Louise

== Reception ==
=== Box office and financial performance ===
Film	Box office gross			Box office ranking		Home video sales gross	Budget	Ref.
Film	North America	Other territories	Worldwide	All-time North America	All-time worldwide	North America	Budget	Ref.
Knives Out	$165,364,060	$147,534,686	$312,898,746	#362	#539	$23,140,938	$40,000,000	
Glass Onion	$15,000,000	—N/a	$15,000,000	#4,401	#6,149	—N/a	$40,000,000	
Wake Up Dead Man							$151.7 million	

=== Critical and public response ===
Film	Rotten Tomatoes	Metacritic	CinemaScore
Knives Out	97% (472 reviews)	82 (52 reviews)	A−
Glass Onion	91% (438 reviews)	81 (62 reviews)	—N/a
Wake Up Dead Man	92% (335 reviews)	80 (59 reviews)	—N/a
