= The Trench (film) =

- Directed by: William Boyd
- Written by: William Boyd
- Produced by: Steve Clark-Hall
- Starring: Paul Nicholls; Daniel Craig; Julian Rhind-Tutt; Danny Dyer; James D'Arcy
- Edited by: Jim Clark
- Distributed by: Arts Council of England; Entertainment Film Distributors (United Kingdom); Mars Distribution (France)
- Release date: 17 September 1999 (UK)
- Running time: 98 minutes
- Countries: United Kingdom; France
- Language: English

The Trench is a 1999 war film written and directed by William Boyd and starring Paul Nicholls and Daniel Craig. It depicts the experiences of a group of young British soldiers in the 48 hours leading up to the Battle of the Somme in 1916.

James D'Arcy, Cillian Murphy and Ben Whishaw also appear.

== Plot ==
In the summer of 1916, Lance Corporal Dell shows his collection of nude photos to the men of his platoon. Private Billy MacFarlane remarks to his brother Eddie that one of the girls looks familiar to him. The platoon commander, Lieutenant Harte, informs Sergeant Winter that the platoon will be "going over" in the third wave of the upcoming summer offensive, carrying supplies in relative safety. Eddie is reprimanded during night sentry duty by Sergeant Winter for trying to look through a hole in the trench. Billy annoys Eddie afterwards with questions about the girl from the photo and convinces himself it was a young woman named Maria who worked at the Post Office. After morning stand-to, the platoon eggs Eddie on to look through the hole. He sees a scene of relative peace and beauty before being shot in the jaw and neck. Billy is unconsolable as Eddie is taken away on a stretcher.

A Colonel and Public Affairs officers stage a motivational scene with the men, the Colonel telling them the battle will be easy because the German army has been relentlessly bombarded. After an awkward, forced speech, the men are told to cheer. As the Colonel leaves wishing them luck, Private Daventry remarks that he will not be with them. Winter takes him aside and harshly admonishes him for his disrespect. Billy encounters the blasted remains of two privates sent on an errand, dismembered by a shell.

Harte informs Winter that the company commander has ordered a night patrol to bomb the German trench and review the status of their defenses. Winter takes Private Beckwith to bomb the trench, and they capture a German soldier trying to flee. Lance Corporal Dell harasses the prisoner and Daventry speaks to him briefly in German. He tells the platoon that the Germans have clearly not been wiped out as the Colonel said, and are in good spirits.

On the morning of the attack, Lieutenant Harte informs Winter that because another platoon has got lost during the night, they will be going over in the first wave instead. Winter sends Dell to retrieve the platoon's rum ration, but Dell drops it in shock after seeing a wounded man being carried past. He drinks a large amount before a shell knocks him down and breaks the bottle and returns to Winter drunk. Winter requests Harte relinquish his personal whisky for the men, and after refusing, he relents as the men line up. MacFarlane tells Winter he is afraid to go over the top and Winter reassures him he is the type who will make it. MacFarlane looks again at the stolen picture of the girl he believes he knows from the Post Office.

The men go over the top into intense gunfire. Winter is immediately shot in the leg, tries to hide it as he helps MacFarlane out of the trench, is shot several more times and falls back onto MacFarlane. The men struggle out into no man's land where they are shot down, including MacFarlane.

== Cast ==
- Paul Nicholls as Pte. Billy Macfarlane
- Daniel Craig as Sgt. Telford Winter, the platoon sergeant
- Julian Rhind-Tutt as 2nd Lt. Ellis Harte, the platoon commander
- Danny Dyer as LCpl. Victor Dell
- James D'Arcy as Pte. Colin Daventry, a British soldier who starts to worry that he will not survive the war.
- Tam Williams as Pte. Eddie Macfarlane, Billy's older brother, who many believed has pressured Billy into signing up.
- Anthony Strachan as Pte. Horace Beckwith, an overweight Scottish soldier who is engaged to be married after the war. He is eager to kill German soldiers to avenge his friends who have died.
- Michael Moreland as Pte. George Hogg, a friend of Beckwith who becomes angry at him for keeping his engagement a secret from him.
- Adrian Lukis as Lt. Col. Villiers, the battalion's commanding officer
- Ciarán McMenamin as Pte. Charlie Ambrose
- Cillian Murphy as Pte. Rag Rookwood
- John Higgins as Pte. Cornwallis
- Ben Whishaw as Pte. James Deamis
- Tim Murphy as Pte. Bone, Lt Harte's aide
- Danny Nutt as Pte. Dieter Zimmermann, a German soldier captured by Winter and Beckwith

== Critical reception ==
The film was praised by critics for its personal take on the experience of the soldier as opposed to a more traditional action-oriented war film. Variety described the emotional buildup to the final scene as having a "devastatingly hollow note", while the New York Times appreciated its subtle characterization of the platoon as "naive" in the face of a "demonized" enemy. The film holds a 58 score on Metacritic.
