= Student BMJ =

BMJ Student is an online international medical journal aimed at medical students and resident doctors. It is published by BMJ Group. BMJ Student publishes an annual print journal, distributed to medical students at UK freshers fairs.

BMJ Student was launched as a print journal in 1992 with the aim of publishing articles for medical students, and is compiled by a full-time student editor, who takes a year out from medical school. International expert authors, editors and medical students work together to explain how to read research papers, provide practical careers advice, and put theory into practice both in print and online.

The current student editor is Zaynah Khan.

== History ==
BMJ Student was launched in print format in 1992, becoming the first international journal written specifically for medical students.

== Articles ==
Most of the articles are written by medical students and are submitted rather than commissioned. Student BMJ comprises Opinion, Careers and Features.

== Submissions ==
Although it is a student journal, it functions as any other medical journal. The journal receives submissions from medical students and doctors internationally via an online submission form. A decision is then made to accept a manuscript or not. Only a handful of the submissions are finally accepted.

== Impact and awards ==
The journal has won the Guardian Student Media Award twice.

== Former student editors ==
The following persons have been student editor of the journal:

- 2024-2025 George Webster
- 2023-2024 Éabha Lynn
- 2022-2023 Charlotte Rose
- 2021–2022 Pat Lok
- 2020–2021 Nikki Nabavi
- 2019–2020 Anna Harvey
- 2018–2019 Laura Nunez-Mulder
- 2013–2014 Katherine Bettany
- 2012–2013 Isobel Weinberg
- 2011–2012 Neil Chanchlani
- 2010–2011 Oliver Ellis
- 2009–2010 Prizzi Zarsadias
- 2008–2009 Jessie Colquhoun
- 2007–2008 Hugh Ip
- 2006–2007 Balaji Ravichandran
- 2005–2006 Tiago Villanueva/Klaus Morales
- 2003–2005 Deborah Cohen
- 2002–2003 Anna Ellis
- 2001–2002 Navin Chohan
- 2000–2001 Jason O'Neale Roach
- 1999–2000 Siân Knight
- 1998–1999 Simon Kirwin
- 1997–1998 Jessica Buchan (Westall)
- 1996–1997 Pritpal Tamber
- 1992–1996 Luisa Dillner
