= Rest in Metal =

- Poker Face episode
- Episode no.: Season 1 Episode 4
- Directed by: Tiffany Johnson
- Written by: Christine Boylan
- Cinematography by: Christine Ng
- Editing by: Glenn Garland
- Original release date: January 26, 2023
- Running time: 47 minutes

Guest appearances
- Chloë Sevigny as Ruby Ruin; Nicholas Cirillo as Gavin; Chuck Cooper as Deuteronomy; John Darnielle as Al; Benjamin Bratt as Cliff LeGrand; G.K. Umeh as Eskie; Ari Barkan as Drunk Guy; John Hodgman as Dockers; Emily Yoshida as Elsie

Episode chronology
| ← Previous "The Stall" | Next → "Time of the Monkey" |

"Rest in Metal" is the fourth episode of the American murder mystery comedy-drama television series Poker Face. The episode was written by Christine Boylan and directed by Tiffany Johnson. It was released on Peacock on January 26, 2023, alongside "Dead Man's Hand", "The Night Shift", and "The Stall".

The series follows Charlie Cale, a woman with the ability to detect if people are lying; after exposing a murder plot at a casino, she is now on the run from the owner's enforcer Cliff LeGrand. In the episode, Charlie works as a merch seller for a washed-up heavy metal band, Doxxxology. When the new drummer dies during a performance, Charlie finds that his death may not have been an accident.

The episode received positive reviews from critics, who praised the writing, performances (particularly Lyonne, Sevigny, and Cirillo) and tension.

== Plot ==
In Kenosha, Wisconsin, Ruby Ruin (Chloë Sevigny), vocalist for heavy metal band Doxxxology, recruits Gavin (Nicholas Cirillo) as a temporary drummer for a summer tour. She, guitarist Al (John Darnielle) and bassist Eskie (G.K. Umeh) attempt to write a song recapturing the success of their only hit song "Staplehead" but are constantly frustrated by Gavin's incessant drumming and distractible personality. During a performance, Ruby punches Gavin for stealing her signature scream note, but she apologizes later at their hotel. Gavin then performs a song he has drafted, "Sucker Punch". The group is stunned by the song's catchy quality but frustrated that all the kudos will belong to Gavin, as most of the royalties from "Staplehead" went to the band's original drummer. Predicting that "Sucker Punch" will bring them back to their 1990s glory, the band conspires to steal the song from Gavin by killing him; they fire their roadie Deuteronomy (Chuck Cooper) and rig Gavin's amplifier to fatally electrocute him during the climactic scream of "Staplehead". They then rewrite and sign the lyrics, burning Gavin's original lyric sheet.

A few days prior, Ruby hires Charlie (Natasha Lyonne) as the band's merch seller/roadie. She begins to bond with Gavin, noticing that he never wears shoes, has a camera pointed at his kick drum, and writes lyrics spontaneously based on his surroundings. She also scolds Ruby after the punching incident, prompting her to apologize to Gavin. The next day, she witnesses Gavin's death on stage after taking a Polaroid of the climactic moment. Charlie picks up on Ruby's lie when she says that the band "got lucky" to the coroner, who rules Gavin's death as an accident. While the band records Gavin's song the next day, Charlie meets a woman (Emily Yoshida) who hosts a true crime podcast called Murder Girl.

While cleaning her car ahead of a concert in Milwaukee, Charlie realizes that the lyrics to "Sucker Punch" correspond to advertising slogans on items in Gavin's pockets. When questioned by Charlie, Ruby admits that Gavin wrote the song but insists that the band needs a new hit so they can avoid going back to obscurity. Questioning Deuteronomy, Charlie learns that modern amps usually have three prongs as a safety measure. Finding Gavin's amp in the trailer, she realizes that an older and unsafe model was used on stage when Gavin died. Charlie also overhears Al, who has a habit of making up lyrics off the top of his head, singing about killing Gavin. Finally, Charlie uses Gavin's footwork camera to confirm that the band wore thick-soled Doc Martens during the performance to avoid electrocution themselves. She confronts the band about killing Gavin, but Ruby fires her and has security escort her away.

Charlie learns that a video of her punching the lead singer of Krampus, the band that Doxxxology is opening for, has gone viral. Cliff (Benjamin Bratt) suddenly appears and chases her; she flees into the concert and succeeds in escaping. As "Sucker Punch" leads to renewed interest in Doxxxology, the members prepare to sign a new recording contract. However, the deal is ruined once a record executive reveals that the rhythm to "Sucker Punch", which the band never modified from Gavin's original draft, is stolen from the Benson theme song. Furthermore, the band's crimes have been exposed in an episode of Murder Girl, with the host having been tipped off with Charlie's evidence.

== Production ==
=== Development ===
The series was announced in March 2021, with Rian Johnson serving as creator, writer, director and executive producer. Johnson stated that the series would delve into "the type of fun, character driven, case-of-the-week mystery goodness I grew up watching." The episode was directed by Tiffany Johnson, while Christine Boylan wrote it. Boylan worked in making sure that every detail of the episode added to an impact of the story, saying "My motto is 'use everything'. Use every piece of furniture around you. If there's a bottle of water, then what's interesting about that bottle? Use it somehow. And if it doesn't work, you can cut it out."

=== Casting ===
The announcement of the series included that Natasha Lyonne would serve as the lead actress. She was approached by Johnson about working on a procedural project together, with Lyonne as the lead character. As Johnson explained, the role was "completely cut to measure for her." Benjamin Bratt also joined the series in the recurring role of Cliff, whose character chases Charlie after she ran away from the casino in a previous episode.

Due to the series' procedural aspects, the episodes feature several guest stars. Johnson was inspired by the amount of actors who guest starred on Columbo, wanting to deem each guest star as the star of the episode, which allowed them to attract many actors. The episode featured appearances by Chloë Sevigny and Nicholas Cirillo, who were announced to guest star in June 2022. The episode also featured an appearance by John Darnielle, who also worked in writing the songs of the episode.

== Critical reception ==
"Rest in Metal" received extremely positive reviews from critics. Saloni Gajjar of The A.V. Club gave the episode an "A−" grade and wrote, "How often can Charlie find herself in a situation where a stranger she meets ends up six feet into the ground? But it's still early into the show, so I'm not complaining. The Columbo-esque gimmick is paying off richly. I'm thrilled there are six more episodes of Charlie finding herself in a mess she has to dig herself out of."

Alan Sepinwall wrote, "It's also the one of these four that most effectively uses the Knives Out/Glass Onion rewind gimmick, as seeing Charlie hanging out with the doomed drummer adds even more value to her desire to catch his killers than the glimpses of her friendship with Natalie do in 'Dead Man's Hand'. And the payoff to the drummer's seemingly random Benson love is, like the trash can bit in 'The Night Shift', a great bit of sleight of hand. As the playwright Anton Chekhov once wrote, if you put a Robert Guillaume sitcom on the screen in act one..." Amanda Whiting of Vulture gave the episode a 4 star rating out of 5 and wrote, "Of the initial episode drop, 'Rest in Metal' is the first in which the crime feels genuinely 'getawaywithable' to me. Some of that might be because Ruby, thanks to Sevigny's steely interpretation of what it looks like to be a woman in despair, is the first killer we've met who really seems to have her whole heart in the game."

== See also ==
- "Zooropa", a song by U2 whose lyrics are also a series of advertising slogans
