= The Stall (Poker Face) =

- Poker Face episode
- Episode no.: Season 1 Episode 3
- Directed by: Iain B. MacDonald
- Written by: Wyatt Cain
- Cinematography by: Jason Presant
- Editing by: Shaheed Qaasim
- Original release date: January 26, 2023
- Running time: 55 minutes

Guest appearances
- Lil Rel Howery as Taffy Boyle; Danielle Macdonald as Mandy Boyle; Shane Paul McGhie as Austin / Hanky T. Pickins; Larry Brown as George Boyle

Episode chronology
← Previous "The Night Shift"	Next → "Rest in Metal"

"The Stall" is the third episode of the American murder mystery comedy-drama television series Poker Face. The episode was written by executive story editor Wyatt Cain and directed by executive producer Iain B. MacDonald. It was released on Peacock on January 26, 2023, alongside "Dead Man's Hand", "The Night Shift" and "Rest in Metal".

The series follows Charlie Cale, a woman with the ability to detect if people are lying; after exposing a murder plot at a casino, she is now on the run from the owner's enforcer Cliff LeGrand. In the episode, Charlie arrives in Texas at a barbecue joint. She befriends the cook, accidentally causing him to become vegan. When he is found dead, Charlie sets out to find what really happened.

The episode received positive reviews from critics, who praised Natasha Lyonne's performance, guest actors, humor, score, and writing.

== Plot ==
In rural Texas, Taffy Boyle (Lil Rel Howery) runs a popular BBQ joint with his brother George (Larry Brown). However, George informs Taffy he is quitting the business after deciding to become vegan. Taffy, who is not an expert cook and indebted to shady organizations in Dallas, fails to convince George to change his mind but accepts George's request to drink beers with him that night. Taffy hosts a radio talk show and leaves for sixteen minutes during a pre-recorded segment about sausage, spoofing it as a live response to a question asked by George's wife Mandy (Danielle Macdonald). He goes to George's trailer home, where George has passed out from the beer Taffy had drugged earlier. Taffy locks the trailer and uses a hose to suffocate George via a meat smoker. Taffy is attacked by a wild dog who barks at him, forcing him to hit it on the head to avoid detection. He resumes the talk show in the nick of time.

A few days before, Charlie (Natasha Lyonne) arrives in the area. She is forced to keep a feisty dog who jumps into her car and will not leave. The dog runs into the BBQ joint, causing damage to the food, prompting Taffy to demand $300 in reimbursement. As she doesn't have the money, George offers to let her pay by working with him. During the next few days, the two bond over George's cooking methods, and she gives him some DVDs to pass time. The next day, after George watches Okja, he decides to become vegan and quit his job. After informing Taffy of both decisions, George talks to Charlie about his uncertain future, but Charlie is forced to go back to work before George explains his only plan.

That night, after finishing his talk show, Taffy informs Mandy that their plan is complete. Mandy sends an employee to George's trailer to get paprika and he finds George dead. The police conclude that George committed suicide. Taffy has an alibi as he was ostensibly broadcasting his radio show. The BBQ joint holds a funeral for George, with Taffy stating that he plans to keep the business going to honor him. On the road, Charlie finds the same dog that George attacked, who survived and is badly wounded. She takes the dog to the veterinarian, who states that the dog was attacked with a piece of wood. Charlie notes that the wood's scent is the same as the pecan wood that George used in his cooking. She raises her suspicions to Taffy, who rebuffs everything and warns her to leave Texas, indirectly threatening her with a shotgun.

Charlie sneaks into George's trailer, finding that the BBQ joint's dental floss was used to lock the door from outside. She is caught by Mandy, who sits down for a beer with her. Charlie expresses her suspicions and reveals her ability to detect lies, unaware that Mandy conspired with Taffy in the murder. Charlie tests the distance that Taffy could have used in going from the radio station to the trailer, suspecting that he pre-recorded his talk show. She also suspects Mandy is involved as the recorded segment was prompted by her question and Charlie knows she lied about not knowing where the paprika was. Mandy is able to deflect the accusation with carefully worded half-truths and warns Charlie to leave, as she does not have any solid proof.

The next day, Charlie confronts Taffy. She has found that George's beer bottle was washed clean and deduced it was laced with Ambien and that Taffy left the radio station because the recording did not include the sound of a passing train that night. She then arranges for one of Taffy's radio co-workers, Austin (Shane Paul McGhie) to imitate Taffy's voice and give Mandy a phone call, telling her he wants to confess. Charlie distracts Taffy long enough for the police and Mandy to arrive, with Mandy having reached authorities first to identify Taffy as the killer. Austin then broadcasts Mandy's confession, leading to her arrest as well. Charlie leaves the area, while Austin keeps the dog under his care.

== Production ==
=== Development ===
The series was announced in March 2021, with Rian Johnson serving as creator, writer, director and executive producer. Johnson stated that the series would delve into "the type of fun, character driven, case-of-the-week mystery goodness I grew up watching." The episode was directed by executive producer Iain B. MacDonald, while executive story editor Wyatt Cain wrote it. This was MacDonald's first directing credit and Cain's first writing credit.

=== Casting ===
The announcement of the series included that Natasha Lyonne would serve as the main lead actress. She was approached by Johnson about working on a procedural project together, with Lyonne as the lead character. As Johnson explained, the role was "completely cut to measure for her."

Due to the series' procedural aspects, the episodes feature several guest stars. Johnson was inspired by the amount of actors who guest starred on Columbo, wanting to deem each guest star as the star of the episode, which allowed them to attract many actors. The episode featured appearances by Danielle Macdonald, Lil Rel Howery and Shane Paul McGhie, who were announced to guest star in May, June and August 2022, respectively. Howery described his character as "it's very villainous, and I enjoyed everything about it."

== Critical reception ==
"The Stall" received extremely positive reviews from critics. Saloni Gajjar of The A.V. Club gave the episode an "A" grade and wrote, "Poker Face is a shining example of a show built around its star. It's a love letter to Lyonne, who fits into Charlie's shoes like a pro. Her trademark wit, deadpan one-liner deliveries, and surprising depth transform PF into more than a delectable Rian Johnson mystery-of-the-week drama. Here, Charlie doles out sarcastic rapid-fire remarks to an audience of one: a pooch she's trying to get rid of. Lyonne is essentially making the most of her screen time, dialing up the comedy as the show increases its complex suspense in 'The Stall.'"

Alan Sepinwall wrote, "The episode has Natasha Lyonne arguing with a temperamental, flatulent dog for one long stretch, and her tasting lots of pieces of wood for another. Oh, and in between, it has perhaps the first pop culture murder ever inspired by a viewing of Okja. So, yeah, it's a fun one." Amanda Whiting of Vulture gave the episode a 3 star rating out of 5 and wrote, "Part of the fun of Poker Face is watching the series tease out the limitations and implications of Charlie's ability to separate bull-truth from bullshit. In the pilot episode, we learned her gift can work over video recording; in 'The Stall', we find out that it doesn't work over sound waves alone."
