= Exit Stage Death =

- Poker Face episode
- Episode no.: Season 1 Episode 6
- Directed by: Ben Sinclair
- Written by: Chris Downey
- Cinematography by: Jaron Presant
- Editing by: Paul Swain
- Original release date: February 9, 2023
- Running time: 47 minutes

Guest appearances
- Ellen Barkin as Kathleen Townsend; Tim Meadows as Michael Graves; Audrey Corsa as Rebecca; Jameela Jamil as Ava; Niall Cunningham as Harry; Chris McKinney as Phil

Episode chronology
← Previous "Time of the Monkey"	Next → "The Future of the Sport"

"Exit Stage Death" is the sixth episode of the American murder mystery comedy-drama television series Poker Face. The episode was written by co-executive producer Chris Downey and directed by Ben Sinclair. It was released on Peacock on February 9, 2023.

The series follows Charlie Cale, a woman with the ability to detect if people are lying; after exposing a murder plot at a casino, she is now on the run from the owner's enforcer Cliff LeGrand. In the episode, Charlie works as a waitress in a dinner theater. When an actor's wife dies on stage, she suspects there was involvement on behalf of the actors.

The episode received positive reviews from critics, who praised the humor, writing, and performances of Lyonne, Barkin, and Meadows.

== Plot ==
Veteran TV actress Kathleen Townsend (Ellen Barkin) arrives at a mansion to visit her former co-star, Michael Graves (Tim Meadows). Former stars of the acclaimed buddy cop show Spooky and the Cop, they seemingly despise each other in present day. Michael has married a younger woman named Ava (Jameela Jamil), who made her fortune by founding SheTrade, an online discount brokerage for women. Kathleen begs Michael to reunite in a one-night-only performance of The Ghosts of Pensacola at a dinner theater to revitalize her career, and he reluctantly accepts after Ava convinces him.

Kathleen's demanding direction and Michael's behavior make for a toxic environment. The play includes several stage effects, including shaking rafters to simulate planes flying overhead and a trapdoor for Kathleen, all designed by stage manager Phil (Chris McKinney). As cast-mate Rebecca (Audrey Corsa) delivers a monologue, the two stage an argument over their earpieces, which is overheard by the theatre staff. Kathleen then rigs a spotlight to fall during the plane effect and Michael sabotages the trapdoor, removing the mat below and replacing the stop on the door with a piece of dry ice. When the spotlight misses Michael, he seemingly collapses due to a stress-induced heart condition. As Ava rushes to the stage to give him his medication, she falls through the trapdoor and is killed. It is later revealed that Kathleen and Michael were actually secret lovers who conspired to kill Ava for her wealth.

Three weeks prior, Charlie (Natasha Lyonne) is fired from her job as a waitress. She runs into Phil, who refers her for a job at the dinner theater. During rehearsal, Charlie annoys Kathleen by performing her duties while wearing soundproof earbuds. In return, Charlie derides Kathleen's acting with her anti-lying ability, calling out her lack of conviction. Ava generously tips Charlie to ensure her wine glass is never empty during the show. Despite previously encouraging Michael to do the show, she hopes that the play will be a failure and end Michael's aspirations for good.

The police rule Ava's death an accident, and Phil blames himself for being asleep during the tragedy, unaware that Kathleen drugged his thermos to prevent him from interfering. The cast prepares for an encore performance the next day, having sold out after the show went viral for Ava's dramatic death. Before the performance, Rebecca confronts Kathleen and Michael with a script of the argument they had to secure their alibi, which she notes was plagiarized from an episode of Spooky and the Cop. She demands $5 million wired to her account by the end of the play or she will tell the police. While investigating the incident, Charlie deduces that someone tried to kill Kathleen after watching a recording from the previous night, noticing mist coming from the sublimating dry ice under the trapdoor.

As she tries to warn Kathleen during the play, Charlie notes that Michael's hand has the same burn marks as hers from picking up the dry ice. She also spots a feather from Kathleen's costume in the rafters. When Charlie hears to the conviction in Kathleen's voice when professing her love for Michael during the performance, Charlie realizes their feud is a facade and the two worked together to murder Ava. Charlie shares her suspicions with Rebecca, who covers for the pair, but Charlie senses Rebecca's deception. Charlie finds the argument script and also discovers that Kathleen has placed peanut butter in the prop snack mix, which would trigger Rebecca's peanut allergy. Charlie is forced to enter onstage and improvise dialogue to prevent Rebecca dying. After Charlie exits, Rebecca (in character) tells Kathleen and Michael that her demands have doubled and they must pay her immediately, prompting them to leave the stage during her monologue.

Kathleen and Michael argue backstage, while Charlie supplies the sheriff with earpieces that record their conversation. They confess to Ava's murder and planning to kill Rebecca so they can avoid paying her off. Once the couple discovers they have been recorded, they proceed onstage for the last time. The police arrive but allow them to complete the performance, which culminates with Kathleen falling through the trapdoor after her character's final monologue.

== Production ==
=== Development ===
The series was announced in March 2021, with Rian Johnson serving as creator, writer, director and executive producer. Johnson stated that the series would delve into "the type of fun, character driven, case-of-the-week mystery goodness I grew up watching." The episode was directed by Ben Sinclair, while co-executive producer Chris Downey wrote it. This was Sinclair's first directing credit, and Downey's first writing credit for the show.

=== Casting ===
The announcement of the series included that Natasha Lyonne would serve as the lead actress. She was approached by Johnson about working on a procedural project together, with Lyonne as the lead character. As Johnson explained, the role was "completely cut to measure for her."

Due to the series' procedural aspects, the episodes feature several guest stars. Johnson was inspired by the number of actors who guest starred on Columbo, wanting to deem each guest star as the star of the episode, which allowed them to attract many actors. The episode featured appearances by Ellen Barkin, Tim Meadows, Audrey Corsa and Niall Cunningham, who were announced to guest star in June 2022.

=== Writing ===
The idea for the episode was suggested by Christine Boylan, who pitched that a murder could take place at a dinner theater. Executive producers Nora Zuckerman and Lilla Zuckerman then created the characters of Kathleen and Michael, who were named after Kathleen Turner and Michael Douglas, who both starred in previous films. Nora Zuckerman explained, "We had a lot of fun writing those fake scenes because they were detached and funny. The other idea that came out of [the writing process] was that this is an older play. This is not a hip, cool play of now. This is something that Michael and Kathleen would have done at the beginning of their career. So, it's not the most politically correct play, and it's probably not the most successful." Originally, the episode would conclude with the arrests, but the writers decided, based on Barkin's performance, to end it with the monologue.

== Critical reception ==
"Exit Stage Death" received extremely positive reviews from critics. Saloni Gajjar of The A.V. Club gave the episode an "A–" grade and wrote, "Poker Face does an excellent job of making the supporting characters feel lived in. It's the most crucial yet challenging aspect of the show because the episodes don't open with Lyonne's Charlie Cale — who tends to enter the picture a good 15 to 20 minutes in — but with the killers and their victims. Except: PF ensures they're not monotonous. It's easy to invest in all of their stories, which explains why Charlie is also drawn to the case and is motivated to solve the crime. Much like Columbo or even Veronica Mars, her reasons are usually personal and not because she's a detective on the job. It's what makes Poker Face stand out too."

Alan Sepinwall of Rolling Stone wrote, "This one does a nice job of keeping the audience guessing during the opening sequence. Is Tim Meadows going to kill Ellen Barkin, or vice versa? Instead, it turns out the two Eighties mystery drama co-stars are only pretending to want each other dead so that they can secretly conspire to murder Meadows' wealthy wife. It's another clever deviation from the default Poker Face formula. And like 'Up All Night', it's an instance of Charlie having no real relationship with the killer or victim, but instead getting invested because she likes the person taking the fall for it — in this case, involving a literal fall."

Amanda Whiting of Vulture gave the episode a 4 star rating out of 5 and wrote, "To that end, 'Exit Stage Death' feels like an experiment: Can you make a satisfying episode of Columbo that barely stars Columbo? There's a certain generosity to Poker Face, a show in which the central star is structurally excluded from at least the first third of every episode and, lately, feels like she's disappearing from the script altogether. This week, she's not even the first person to solve the crime! It's procedural TV that gives itself the flexibility to tweak the procedure, and the show is improving for it. For example, it's been weeks since Benjamin Bratt showed up hot on Charlie's tail in the closing sequence. And the episodes feel lighter to me and more dynamic because Rian Johnson jettisoned the trademark coda just as it was starting to feel stale and obligatory." Sarah Fields of Telltale TV gave the episode a 3.5 star rating out of 5 and wrote, "Poker Face continues to play with tropes and subvert expectations in ingenious ways. The unraveling of this week's mystery isn't quite as clever as some of the previous episodes. Still, expert execution and deliciously fun performances from its guest stars make it just as fun."
