= Dascha Polanco =

Dominican actress (born 1982)

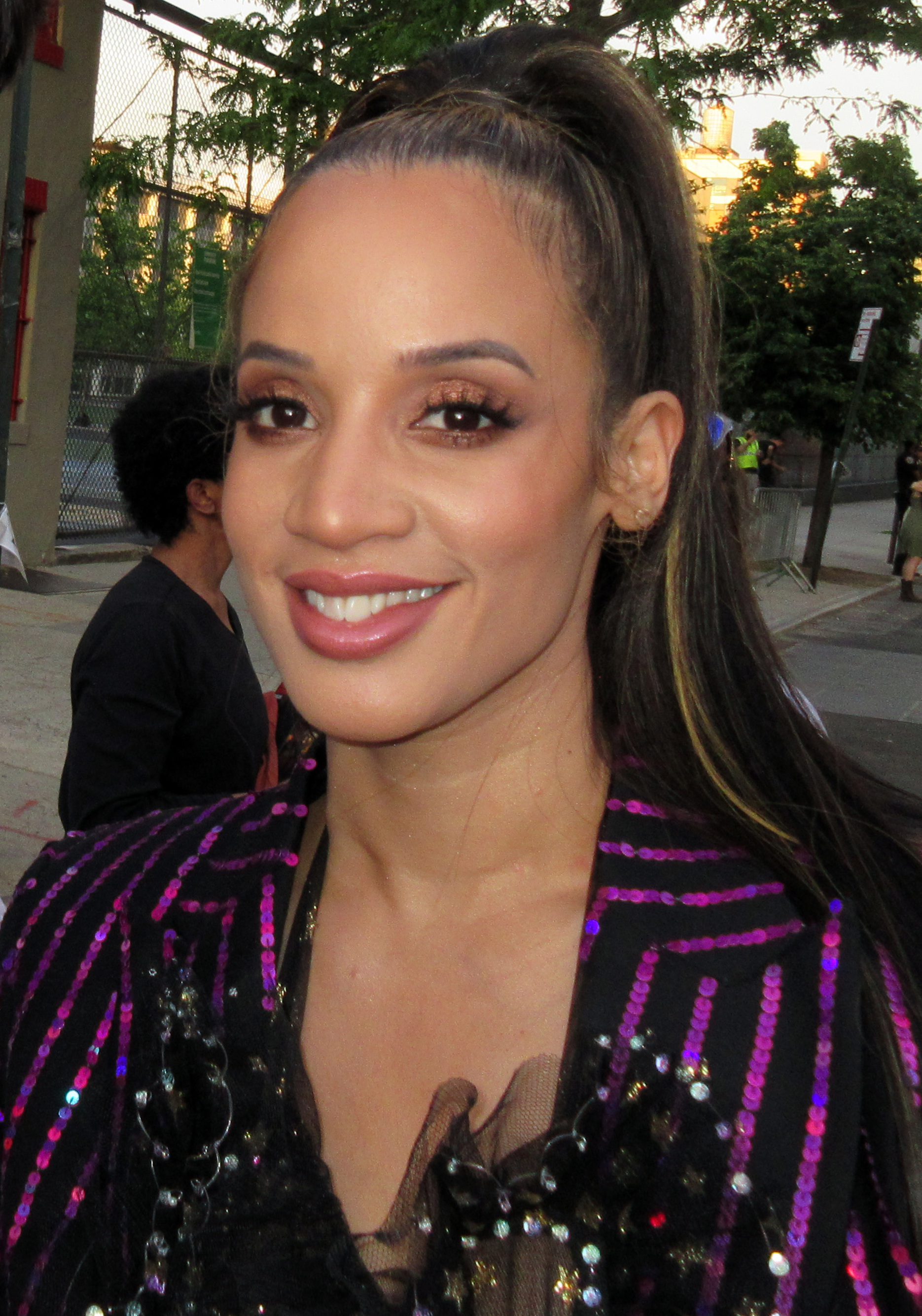
- Polanco in 2019
- Born: Dascha Yolaine Polanco; December 3, 1982 (age 43); Santo Domingo, Dominican Republic
- Education: Hunter College
- Occupation: Actress
- Years active: 2011–present
- Children: 2

Dascha Yolaine Polanco (born December 3, 1982) is a Dominican actress. She is known for portraying the role of Dayanara "Daya" Diaz on the Netflix series Orange Is the New Black, and for the role of Cuca in the 2021 film In the Heights.

== Early life and education ==
Polanco was born in Santo Domingo, Dominican Republic, and moved to the United States at a young age. She was raised in Sunset Park, Brooklyn, and Miami by her father, a mechanic, and mother, a cosmetologist. Polanco is the oldest of three children; she has a brother and sister.

Polanco attended Hunter College, where she was a first-generation college student and earned a bachelor’s degree in psychology in 2008.

== Career ==
Polanco aspired to be an actress from an early age but "always doubted auditioning because of her weight", so she completed a bachelor's degree in psychology at Hunter College, as a first generation college student. After college she began working in the healthcare industry with the intention of becoming a nurse. She was working in hospital administration at Montefiore Medical Center in the Bronx while studying nursing when she gained the courage to pursue acting again and registered herself with an acting studio. She attended BIH Studios in New York, and while there, she was signed by the talent agency Shirley Grant Management. Her first acting credits were minor parts in the television series Unforgettable and NYC 22.

In 2012, Polanco was cast in the Netflix series Orange Is the New Black as Dayanara "Daya" Diaz.

In 2013, Polanco appeared in the independent film Gimme Shelter before returning to her role on Orange Is the New Black for the show's second season. In June 2014, it was announced that she had been promoted from a recurring role to a series regular for the show's third season, which was released in June 2015. She appeared in the comedy films The Cobbler and Joy, and starred in the film The Perfect Match.

In 2018, Polanco had a recurring role in The Assassination of Gianni Versace: American Crime Story, and in 2019, she had a recurring role in Netflix series, Russian Doll and When They See Us.

In 2021, Polanco played the role of Cuca, one of the lead salon ladies, in the film In the Heights. From 2021 to 2022, she voiced Ms. Camilla Torres, the mother of Winston who owns a record shop, in the animated series Karma's World.

In 2025, Polanco starred as Marcela Borgas in the Lifetime film Terror Comes Knocking: The Marcela Borgas Story, a part of the channel's "Ripped from the Headlines" feature films.

== Personal life ==
Polanco has two children, a daughter and a son. Her daughter portrayed a younger version of Polanco's character in the fifth season of Orange is the New Black. Polanco became a grandmother in October 2023 when her daughter Dasany gave birth to her first son Dior.

== Filmography ==
=== Film ===
| Year | Title | Role | Notes |
|---|---|---|---|
| 2013 | Gimme Shelter | Carmel | |
| 2014 | The Cobbler | Macy | |
| 2015 | Joy | Jackie | |
| 2016 | The Perfect Match | Pressie | |
| 2018 | Mutafukaz | Luna (voice) | English dub |
| 2019 | The Irishman | Nurse | |
| 2021 | In the Heights | Cuca | |
| 2022 | DC League of Super-Pets | Jessica Cruz (voice) | |
| 2022 | Samaritan | Tiffany Cleary | |
| 2023 | A Little Prayer | Narcedalia | |
| 2026 | Evil Genius | | |

=== Television ===
| Year | Title | Role | Notes |
|---|---|---|---|
| 2011 | Unforgettable | Estella | Episode: "Trajectories" |
| 2012 | NYC 22 | Fan #2 | Episode: "Firebomb" |
| 2013–2019 | Orange Is the New Black | Dayanara "Daya" Diaz | 81 episodes Screen Actors Guild Award for Outstanding Performance by an Ensemble in a Comedy Series (2014, 2015) |
| 2018 | The Assassination of Gianni Versace: American Crime Story | Det. Lori Wieder | 3 episodes |
| 2019 | Russian Doll | Beatrice | 4 episodes |
| 2019 | When They See Us | Elena | Episode: "Part Three" |
| 2019 | Evil | Patti Hitchens | Episode: "3 Stars" |
| 2023 | Poker Face | Natalie Hill | Episode: "Dead Man's Hand" |
| 2024 | Dora | La Reina (voice) | 2 episodes |
| 2025 | Terror Comes Knocking: The Marcela Borgas Story | Marcela Borgas | Television film |
| 2025 | The Walking Dead: Dead City | Lucia Narvaez | Main role; 6 episodes |

== See also ==
- List of Afro-Latinos
