= The 4:30 Movie (film) =

Film by Kevin Smith

- Release poster
- Directed by: Kevin Smith
- Written by: Kevin Smith
- Produced by: Joshua Bachove; Liz Destro; Jordan Monsanto
- Starring: Austin Zajur; Nicholas Cirillo; Reed Northrup; Siena Agudong; Ken Jeong
- Cinematography: Yaron Levy
- Edited by: Kevin Smith
- Music by: Bear McCreary
- Production companies: Destro Films; SMODCO; View Askew Productions
- Distributed by: Saban Films
- Release date: September 13, 2024
- Running time: 88 minutes
- Country: United States
- Language: English
- Budget: $3 million
- Box office: $2,389

The 4:30 Movie is a 2024 American semi-autobiographical coming-of-age comedy film written and directed by Kevin Smith. It stars Austin Zajur, Nicholas Cirillo, Reed Northrup, Siena Agudong, and Ken Jeong. The story is loosely based on Smith's experiences sneaking into movie theaters as a teenager and his earliest romantic endeavors. It was released on September 13, 2024, by Saban Films.

== Plot ==
In 1986, New Jersey teenager Brian David calls his crush, Melody Barnegat, at her job to ask her out to the movies. He made out with her in her pool a year prior but got too scared to go to second base with her. She says yes to a date, seeing a 4:30 showing of the movie Bucklick, an R-rated detective comedy based on her mother's favorite book series. Brian then goes for a bike ride, purchases a magazine, and sits at the pier to record his thoughts in a tape recorder, which he keeps on him to record essential thoughts as he wants to be a writer.

He then meets his friend Belly, an awkward wrestling fan, and Burny, a self-proclaimed ladies' man who obsessively washes his pick-up truck. Burny is unhappy with Brian asking Melody to join them at the theater, as they plan on hopping all day (paying for one movie and sneaking into two others). They arrive at Atlantic Cinemas, run by egotistical manager Mike. Mike loves banning people from his theater and driving in a modified Batmobile called the "Movie Mobile." The first movie is a sci-fi adventure film, Astro Blaster & The Beaver Men. While Brian and Burny save their seats, Belly stands in line at the concession stand. Belly gets kicked out when an obnoxious child tells his Dad that Belly exposed himself to him after he gives him an attitude. Burny helps Belly sneak in through the back.

After the trailers, some older girls (friends with Burny's older brother) arrive at the theater and sit in front of them. Burny hits on one of them, who agrees to have sex with him in the back of the theater during the movie. Brian gets a phone call from his mother, through an Emergency Breakthrough call to the theater, who lectures him about bathing the cat. Embarrassed, Brian gets another Emergency Breakthrough call. This time, it's from Melody, who tells Brian that she can't go to the 4:30 showing of Bucklick because she has to have dinner with her Mom. They agree to see the later showing. Burny is even more agitated because that means changing their plans and seeing the third movie, a sex comedy called Dental School, as their second film.

Belly is told to wait in the bathroom before the movie ends so he doesn't get caught by Manager Mike. However, as he waits in a bathroom stall, he is caught masturbating to graffiti on the stall. He is then kicked out again. Brian and Burny attempt to sneak into Dental School by distracting a disgruntled usher. However, they find out the movie is sold out, and no seats are available. In a heated exchange, they get attacked in the hallway by pre-teen girls offended by Burny’s cursing. All three boys are kicked out and banned for life from the theater.

Burny and Brian argue in an alley about their plans being ruined. Burny blames David for getting Melody involved, and Brian defends her. It escalates into a fistfight until Belly intervenes and observes that Brian and Melody's relationship threatens Burny, and Brian is too concerned with seeking Burny's approval. Brian attempts to reconcile, but Burny rejects him and leaves. Burny sits at a park to reflect when he spots his favorite wrestler, Major Murder. He talks to Major Murder, who reveals he is there to spend time with his wife before the next big match. He reveals that he and his wife have been together since high school and that she always had his back, even when being bullied for being overweight as a child. This talk makes Burny understand Brian and his crush on Melody.

Meanwhile, Brian sulks behind the theater when an attractive female usher spots him. They bond over their love for film, and she tells Brian she is moving to Rhode Island to attend film school as she wants to be a director. Brian is impressed with her ambitions, though the usher tells him she sees the same ambition in him. A love for film is the first step towards wanting to be a filmmaker. She returns to work, and Brian is left inspired. He runs to the front of the theater to meet with Melody and tell her he has been banned. Brian has a plan and confronts Manager Mike to plea with him to lift the ban. He refuses and bullies Brian in front of all the other patrons, causing Melody to defend Brian and berate Manager Mike for his attitude towards customers. She gets banned as well, but as they are being thrown out, Burny is seen crashing his truck into Manager Mike's car to serve as a distraction so Brian and Melody can sneak into the theater and see Bucklick.

Before the movie can begin, they are caught by Melody's strict mother, who berates her for sneaking into an R-rated movie. They leave the theater and talk in the park about their dreams and the nature of their relationship. Brian finally asks her out, and they walk in the park together, hand-in-hand, as boyfriend and girlfriend. Brian observes that their day could be a movie someday.

In a mid-credits scene, Melody, Belly, and Burny try to get Brian to muster up the courage to apply for a job at the Quick Stop convenience store. Brian looks at the store and tells the three, "It can wait."

== Cast ==
- Austin Zajur as Brian David
- Nicholas Cirillo as Burny
- Reed Northrup as Belly
- Siena Agudong as Melody Barnegat
- Justin Long as Stank
- Jason Lee as Brian's dad
- Kate Micucci as Melody's mom
- Genesis Rodriguez as "hot usher"
- Diedrich Bader as Damocles
- Ken Jeong as Manager Mike
- Rachel Dratch as Brian's mom
- Sam Richardson as Major Murder
- Adam Pally as "emo usher"
- Harley Quinn Smith as Sister Sugar Walls
- Method Man as Cookie
- Betty Aberlin as Mrs. B
- Logic as Astro Blaster
- Brian O'Halloran as Father Hicks
- Jeff Anderson as dad on concession line
- Rosario Dawson as Aunt Connie
- Jason Mewes as a John
- Jason Biggs as a construction worker

== Production ==
Filming took place at the end of August 2023, which was approved for filming during the 2023 SAG-AFTRA strike as the film's backers signed an interim agreement. It was filmed at SModcastle Cinemas, a New Jersey movie theater that Smith co-owns.

== Release ==
Saban Films acquired distribution rights and ran a tour throughout the summer in the United States, followed by a nationwide release.

== Reception ==
On the review aggregator website Rotten Tomatoes, 71% of 48 critics' reviews are positive, with an average rating of 6.2/10. The website's consensus reads: "Kevin Smith dabbles in (relatively) innocent youth and delivers one of his best films in years with The 4:30 Movie, a sweet-natured reverie on the role moviegoing plays in our lives." Metacritic, which uses a weighted average, assigned the film a score of 52 out of 100, based on 12 critics, indicating "mixed or average" reviews.

Filmmaker Vera Drew named it one of her favorite films of 2024, calling it Kevin Smith's "best film in years."
