= K Callan =

American actress (born 1936)

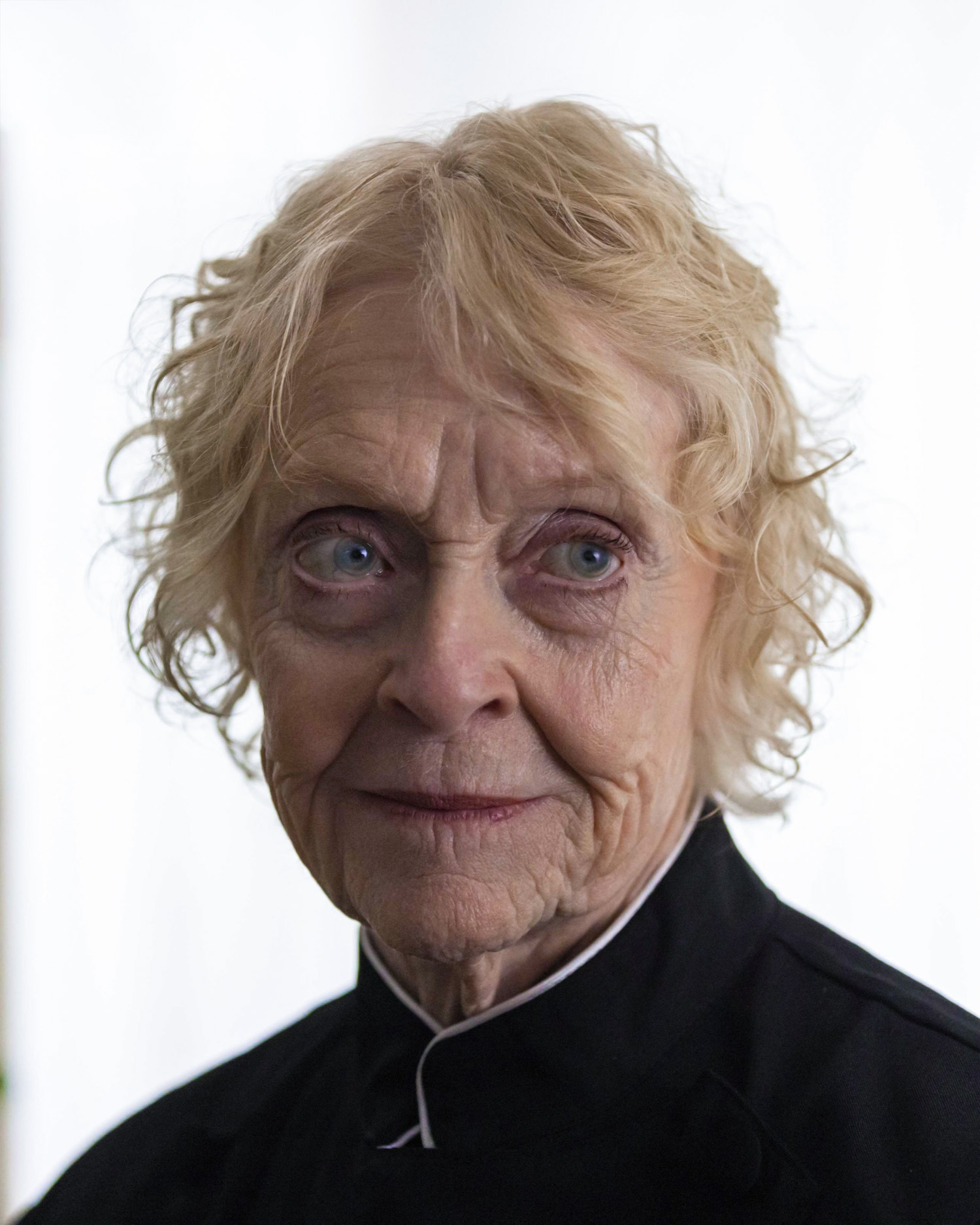
- Callan in 2022
- Born: January 9, 1936 (age 90); Dallas, Texas, U.S.
- Education: North Texas State University
- Occupations: Actress, author
- Years active: 1956–present
- Known for: Lois & Clark: The New Adventures of Superman
- Children: 3
- Website: www.kcallan.com

Katherine Callan (born January 9, 1936) is an American actress and writer. In a career spanning more than six decades, Callan appeared in more than 150 film and television productions. She made her big screen debut starring in the 1970 satirical drama Joe and later appeared in films A Touch of Class (1973), The Onion Field (1979), American Gigolo (1980), Frankie & Johnny (1991), Nine Lives (2005) and Knives Out (2019). On television she played Clark Kent's mother Martha in the ABC comedy-drama series, Lois & Clark: The New Adventures of Superman (1993-1997). She also had recurring roles on Dallas, Coach, Carnivàle, How I Met Your Mother, Getting On, Veep and Widow's Bay.

== Early life ==
Katherine Callan was born in Dallas, Texas. When she was 5 years old, she felt that she wanted to act. She did so in school, and as a student at North Texas State University at Denton, she studied drama. She went on to teach drama at a Catholic girls' school, and she began an arena theatre at that high school with James Callan.

== Career ==
Callan first appeared on television in an episode of Route 66 that happened to be shooting in Dallas. She later moved to New York and received her acting training with Herbert Berghof at HB Studio, as well as Stella Adler, Larry Ross and others in Los Angeles. In 1964, she had a recurring role in soap opera, The Secret Storm. In 1970, Callan made her big screen debut starring as Mary Lou Curran, the long-suffering, mousy wife of Peter Boyle's title character in the 1970 satirical drama Joe directed by John G. Avildsen. She later played supporting roles in films A Touch of Class (1973) and The Onion Field (1979).

In 1972, Callan starred as Evelyn Jackson in the television adaptation of the 1966 Lanford Wilson play The Rimers of Eldritch. Callan made TV commercials for products, including Anacin, Endust, Geritol, and Sanka. She resumed her television career in 1976 playing the recurring role on CBS sitcom One Day at a Time, and guest-starring parts on Barney Miller, All in the Family, Rhoda, Family and The Waltons. In 1979, she starred in the short-lived drama series, Married: The First Year, and from 1979 to 1980 was female lead on the sitcom Joe's World. In 1980 she also appeared in films American Gigolo and A Change of Seasons and later went to appear in made-for-television movies such as This House Possessed (1981), Splendor in the Grass (1981), Flight 90: Disaster on the Potomac (1984) and Hollywood Wives (1985). From 1980 to 1981 she had supporting role on the short-lived prime time soap opera, Secrets of Midland Heights and in 1983 was regular cast member on the medical drama Cutter to Houston. During the 1980s, Callan also guest-starred on Quincy M.E., Father Murphy, Lou Grant, Newhart, Knots Landing, Remington Steele, St. Elsewhere, Moonlighting and Quantum Leap.

In 1990, Callan portrayed Amy Stevens, the mother of April Stevens Ewing in several episodes of the penultimate season of prime time soap opera, Dallas and the same time had recurring role on sitcom Coach. In 1993 she was cast as Clark Kent's mother Martha in the ABC comedy-drama series, Lois & Clark: The New Adventures of Superman. The series ended in 1997 after four seasons. During the 1990s, Callan also appeared in films The Unborn (1991), Frankie & Johnny (1991) and Safe (1995), and made guest appearances on L.A. Law, Star Trek: Deep Space Nine, NYPD Blue, Chicago Hope and Dawson's Creek. In 2000s, Callan performed in a recurring role as Eleanor McGill in the HBO series, Carnivàle (2003-2005), and guest-starred in shows such as CSI: Crime Scene Investigation, Nip/Tuck, The Closer, the third-season finale of Desperate Housewives as Ilene Britt, the mother of Edie Britt (Nicollette Sheridan), ER and Castle. From 2009 to 2010 she was regular cast member on the TBS sitcom Meet the Browns playing the role of Miss Daisy LaRue. She also portrayed Lily's maternal grandmother on several episodes of How I Met Your Mother from 2007 to 2012.

In 2013, Callan had a recurring role on the HBO comedy series, Getting On and in 2016 in the political comedy Veep. In 2019, she played Wanetta "Great Nana" Thrombey in the mystery film Knives Out (2019). In 2022, she played her first leading film role in the comedy-drama Pie in the Sky based on stage play. In 2023 she starred in an episode "Time of the Monkey" of murder mystery series, Poker Face. The following year she played Elizabeth, mother of John the Baptist on The Chosen and appeared in the thriller film Sew Torn. In 2026, Callan had a recurring role as Ruth Livingston in the horror comedy series, Widow's Bay.

== Personal life ==
Callan was married for 11 years. She lived in Oklahoma while her husband worked on his doctorate. When the marriage ended, she took her three children, including Kelly Callan and Kristi Callan, and moved to New York.

She has written several books, including The Los Angeles Agent, The Script Is Finished, Now What Do I Do?, Directing Your Directing Career, and How to Sell Yourself as an Actor.

== Filmography ==
=== Film ===
Year	Title	Role	Notes
1970	Joe	Mary Lou Curran	As K. Callan
1971	Lady Liberty	Subway Lady	Uncredited
1972	Hail	Mrs. Burd	
1973	A Touch of Class	Patty Menkes	As K. Callan
1979	Fast Break	Ms. Tidwell	
1979	The Onion Field	Mrs. Powell	
1980	American Gigolo	Lisa Williams	
1980	A Change of Seasons	Alice Bingham	
1982	Fast-Walking	Motel Manager	
1991	The Unborn	Martha Wellington	
1991	Frankie and Johnny	Frankie's Mother	
1995	Safe	Mother	Uncredited
1998	Border to Border	Mrs. Piston	
1999	A Fare to Remember	Ginny	
2002	Devious Beings	Lady Jane	
2005	Nine Lives	Marisa	
2005	Crazylove	Mrs. Hallstrom	
2006	Midnight Clear	Eva	
2007	Coyote County Loser	Maggie Hopps	
2010	Why Did I Get Married Too?	Ms. Tannenbaum	
2012	Not That Funny	Toogey Richmonde	
2013	Samuel Bleak	Elaine	
2019	Knives Out	Wanetta "Great Nana" Thrombey	
2022	Pie in the Sky	Mama	
2024	Sew Torn	Ms. Engel	
2026	Bad Day		Complete

=== Television ===
Year	Title	Role	Notes
1962	Route 66	Western Union Operator	Episode: "Aren't You Surprised to See Me?"
1964	The Secret Storm	Gloria	
1972	Great Performances	Evelyn Jackson	Episode: "The Rimers of Eldritch"
1976–1977	One Day at a Time	Alice Butterfield	4 episodes
1977	Barney Miller	Gwen Baxter	Episode: "Fire '77"
1977	The Four of Us	Marie	Unsold pilot
1977	Fish	Mrs. Lester	2 episodes
1977	Fernwood 2 Night	Alberta Cornwall	
1977	James at 16	Mrs. Stevens	Episode: "Pilot"
1977	All in the Family	Veronica Cartwright	Episode: "Cousin Liz"
1977	Rafferty	Betty Dane	
1977	Forever Fernwood	1st Woman	
1977	Rhoda	Dr. Sanders	Episode: "Who's Why"
1978	Family	Sophie Sullivan	Episode: "Starting Over"
1978	Kaz	Mrs. Rice	
1978	A Question of Love	Reporter	TV movie
1979	Visions	Mary Lou	
1979	Insight	Lorraine	
1979	Ike: The War Years	Mrs. Westerfield	Two-part TV movie
1979	Blind Ambition	Mrs. Kleindienst	TV miniseries
1979	The Waltons	Nurse Corrigan	
1979–1980	Joe's World	Katie Wabash	Regular role
1980	When the Whistle Blows	Bulldog's wife	
1980–1981	Secrets of Midland Heights	Hilda Carroll	
1981	This House Possessed	Lucille	TV movie
1981	Flo	Mrs. Carlin	
1981	Splendor in the Grass	Miss Metcalf	TV movie
1982	House Calls		
1982	Quincy, M.E.	Karen Saundersen	
1982	Bosom Buddies	Mrs. Wilson	
1982	Father Murphy	Jane Sanders	
1982	Police Squad!	Charlotte Burton	Episode: "The Butler Did It (A Bird in the Hand)"
1982	Lou Grant	Louise Florence	
1983	Private Benjamin	Harriet Benjamin	
1983	Cutter to Houston	Connie Buford	Regular role
1983	Knots Landing	Mrs. Dunne	Episode: "The Fatal Blow"
1983	Newhart	Janet Ebersol	Episode: "The Visitors"
1984	AfterMASH	Mrs. Bergstrom	
1984	Flight 90: Disaster on the Potomac	Barbara Hamilton	TV movie
1984	E/R	Gail Parker	
1985	Remington Steele	Martha Ryan	
1985	Sara	Claire McKenna	
1985	Hollywood Wives	Catherine	TV miniseries
1985	St. Elsewhere	Patty Galecki	2 episodes
1985–1989	Hunter	Mrs. Jorgensen / Linda Ryan	2 episodes
1986	Moonlighting	Carolyn Kandinsky	Episode: "In God We Strongly Suspect"
1986	You Again?	Kathryn	
1986	It's a Living	Dot's Mom	Episode: "Oddest Couple"
1987	Highway to Heaven	Mrs. Lowell	Episode: "Normal People"
1987	Night Court	Mrs. Jane Fletzker	
1987	Mr. President	Janet Braden	
1987	The Hope Division	Caroline Braden	TV movie
1987	CBS Summer Playhouse	Jean	
1987	Duet	Rose Kelly	
1987	The Magical World of Disney	Betty's Mom	
1987	Rags to Riches	Louis McMillan	
1989	Live-In	Roslyn	
1989	Quantum Leap	Lenore Mackenzie	Episode: "The Americanization of Machiko – August 4, 1953"
1989	Incident at Dark River	Constance Black	TV movie
1989–1991	Coach	Marion Williamson	
1990	Dallas	Amy Stevens	4 episodes
1991	Flight of Black Angel	Mrs. Gordon	TV movie
1992	Nurses	Lila	
1993–1997	Lois & Clark: The New Adventures of Superman	Martha Kent	Regular role
1993	FBI: The Untold Stories	Jorene	
1993	L.A. Law	Florence Hackett	
1994	Star Trek: Deep Space Nine	Alsia	Episode: "Rivals"
1994	Birdland	Laurel	
1995	Saved by the Light	Marion	TV movie
1997	NYPD Blue	Mrs. Hastings	
1997	Chicago Hope	Emily Beck	
1998	7th Heaven	Grandma James	
1998	Mr. Murder	Alice Stillwater	TV miniseries
1999	Dawson's Creek	Miss Constance Freckling	
2000	Family Law	Myra Hollenbeck	
2000	Diagnosis: Murder	Jake's Landlady	Episode: "Death by Design"
2000–2003	King of the Hill	Tilly Hill (voice)	3 episodes
2001	The Fugitive	Evelyn Butler	
2001	Kate Brasher	Mrs. Warmus	
2001–2004	The Division	Mary Johnson / Halle McAdams	3 episodes
2002	Crossing Jordan	Penelope Zimmerman	
2002	Body & Soul	Cora Kilabrough	
2003	JAG	Esther Gale	
2003–2005	Carnivàle	Eleanor McGill	Recurring role, 8 episodes
2004	CSI: Crime Scene Investigation	Martha Abernathy	
2004	Dragnet	Lee's Adoptive Mother	
2005	Without a Trace	Luanne Countryman	
2005	Nip/Tuck	Ellie Harkness	
2006	Four Kings	Mrs. Grayson	
2006	Heist	Helen	
2006	Cold Case	Helen Russell	Episode: "The Hen House"
2006	The Closer	Julia Rose	
2007	Desperate Housewives	Ilene Britt	Episode: "Getting Married Today"
2007	'Til Death	Mrs. Bauer	
2007	Drive	Ceal Cousins	
2007–2012	How I Met Your Mother	Grandma Lois	3 episodes
2008	ER	Kelly Robinson	
2009	Castle	Mrs. Delores Marsh	
2009	Mental	Alexis Vilcek	
2009–2010	Meet the Browns	Miss Daisy/Daisy LaRue	20 episodes
2010	Heroes	Charlie Andrews	
2010	The Mentalist	Annabelle Draber	
2010	Law & Order: LA	Louise Hammond	
2011	Good Luck Charlie	Mrs. Monroe	
2011, 2020	NCIS	Various roles	2 episodes
2013	Emily Owens, M.D.	Lorraine Parks	
2013	Getting On	Susan Dayward	3 episodes
2015	Justified	Loretta's Grandaunt	
2015	Code Black	Ruth	
2016	Veep	Judy Sherman	Recurring role
2017	Grey's Anatomy	Janis	Episode: "In the Air Tonight"
2021	Brooklyn Nine-Nine	Carol	Episode: "Renewal"
2023	Poker Face	Betty	Episode: "Time of the Monkey"
2024	The Chosen	Elizabeth	Episode: "Promises"
2026	Widow's Bay	Ruth Livingston	Recurring role

== Bibliography ==
- Callan, K (1987). The New York Agent Book. Sweden Press. ISBN 978-0-961733-61-2.
- The Los Angeles Agent Book. Sweden Press. 1992. ISBN 978-0-961733-68-1.
- How to Sell Yourself As an Actor: From New York to Los Angeles and Everywhere in Between. Sweden Press. 1992. ISBN 978-0-961733-67-4.
- Script Is Finished, Now What Do I Do?. Sweden Press. 1993. ISBN 978-1-878355-00-3.
- Callan, K (1993). The Life of the Party. Sweden Press. ISBN 1-878355-23-6.
- Callan, K (1994). Directing your directing career. Sweden Press. ISBN 978-1-878355-11-9.
- The Life of the Party 2. 1997. ISBN 978-1-878355-06-5.
