= Poker Face (TV series) =

American television series

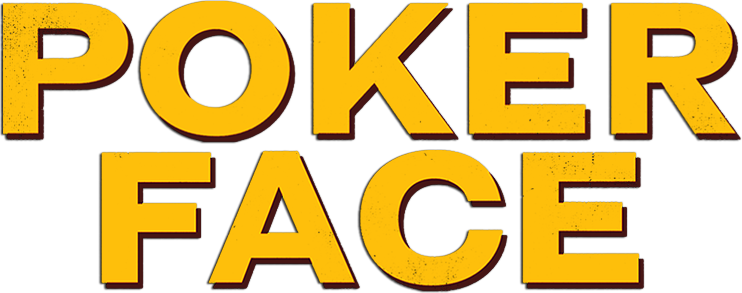
- Genre: Mystery; Crime; Comedy-drama; Black comedy
- Created by: Rian Johnson
- Showrunners: Nora Zuckerman; Lilla Zuckerman; Tony Tost
- Starring: Natasha Lyonne
- Composers: Nathan Johnson; Judson Crane
- Country of origin: United States
- Original language: English
- No. of seasons: 2
- No. of episodes: 22

Production
- Executive producers: Iain B. MacDonald; Nena Rodrigue; Nora Zuckerman; Lilla Zuckerman; Natasha Lyonne; Ram Bergman; Rian Johnson; Chris Provenzano; Adam Arkin; Tony Tost
- Producers: Cameron Angeli; Wyatt Cain
- Production locations: Newburgh, New York; Albuquerque, New Mexico; Laughlin, Nevada
- Cinematography: Steve Yedlin; Christine Ng; Jaron Presant; Tari Segal
- Editors: Bob Ducsay; Glenn Garland; Shaheed Qaasim; Paul Swain; Melissa Kent
- Running time: 42–67 minutes
- Production companies: Zucks.; Animal Pictures; T-Street; MRC Television; Paramount Pictures

Original release
- Network: Peacock
- Release: January 26, 2023 – July 10, 2025

Poker Face is an American crime comedy-drama television series created by Rian Johnson for the streaming service Peacock. Stylized as a "case-of-the-week" murder mystery series, it stars Natasha Lyonne as Charlie Cale, a woman with the innate ability to detect when people are lying, who finds herself solving murders as she travels across the United States.

Peacock announced the series in March 2021, with Lyonne attached and Johnson as director. Nora Zuckerman and Lilla Zuckerman were named as co-showrunners. The first season of Poker Face consisted of 10 episodes and debuted on January 26, 2023. In February 2023, the series was renewed for a second season which premiered on May 8, 2025. The series has received critical acclaim. Lyonne was nominated for Outstanding Lead Actress in a Comedy Series at the 75th Primetime Emmy Awards.

In November 2025, the series was canceled after two seasons. As a result, Johnson is pitching the show to other networks in hopes of getting a two-season agreement to continue the series from them. While Lyonne will no longer be playing Cale, there are plans for Peter Dinklage to take over the role.

== Premise ==
The series centers on Charlie Cale, a woman with an innate ability to detect lies, traveling across the United States in her 1969 Plymouth Barracuda on the run from a casino boss following a suspicious death. Along the way, she encounters colorful characters and solves homicides in a variety of settings. Poker Face is a murder mystery series stylized as a character-driven, case-of-the-week mystery, with each episode adapting the inverted detective story format popularized by Columbo.

== Cast and characters ==
=== Main ===
- Natasha Lyonne as Charlie Cale, a woman with the uncanny ability to tell when people are lying

=== Recurring ===
- Benjamin Bratt as Cliff LeGrand (season 1), the head of security at the casino where Charlie works, with whom she finds herself at odds
- Simon Helberg as Luca Clark, an FBI agent Charlie meets during her travels who helps her
- Rhea Perlman as Beatrix Hasp, Frost Sr.'s rival casino owner
- Steve Buscemi as the voice of Good Buddy (season 2), a CB radio user
- Patti Harrison as Alex (season 2), an awkward young woman that Charlie befriends in New York City

=== Guest ===
==== Season 1 ====
- Adrien Brody as Sterling Frost Jr., the manager of the casino where Charlie works.
- Dascha Polanco as Natalie Hill, Charlie's best friend and a maid at Frost's casino who comes across something insidious
- Noah Segan as Sheriff Parker, the local sheriff of fictional Frost County
- Ron Perlman as Sterling Frost Sr., Frost's ruthless father
- Hong Chau as Marge, a solitary, reclusive trucker whom Charlie befriends
- Megan Suri as Sara, a convenience store worker that both Jed and Damian have a crush on
- Colton Ryan as Jed, an unstable mechanic
- John Ratzenberger as Abe, Jed's uncle and boss
- Brandon Micheal Hall as Damian, a friendly Subway worker
- Chelsea Frei as Dana, a diner waitress
- Lil Rel Howery as Taffy Boyle, the co-owner and business side of a popular barbecue restaurant
- Danielle Macdonald as Mandy Boyle, Taffy's sister-in-law who works with him and George
- Shane Paul McGhie as Austin / Hanky T. Pickins, a bored radio station secretary with a talent for voice acting
- Larry Brown as George Boyle, the co-owner and chef of Taffy's restaurant whom Charlie befriends
- Chloë Sevigny as Ruby Ruin, the leader and vocalist of the band Doxxxology, who struggles to find success and hires Charlie
- Nicholas Cirillo as Gavin, a drummer and big Doxxxology fan
- Chuck Cooper as Deuteronomy, Doxxxology's roadie
- John Darnielle as Al, Doxxxology's guitarist
- G.K. Umeh as Eskie, Doxxxology's bassist
- Judith Light as Irene Smothers, a resident of a retirement home and Joyce's best friend
- S. Epatha Merkerson as Joyce Harris, a resident of a retirement home and Irene's best friend
- K Callan as Betty, a nosy resident of Joyce and Irene's community
- Reed Birney as Ben / Gabriel, a new resident of Joyce and Irene's community that they have a past with
- Ellen Barkin as Kathleen Townsend, an actress with a fading career who has a long-standing feud with Michael
- Tim Meadows as Michael Graves, a mostly retired actor who has a long-standing feud with Kathleen
- Audrey Corsa as Rebecca, the young third actor in Kathleen's play
- Jameela Jamil as Ava, Michael's wealthy wife
- Tim Blake Nelson as Keith Owens, an aging racer
- Charles Melton as Davis McDowell, a young racer that Charlie befriends
- Leslie Silva as Donna Owens, Owens's wife
- Angel Desai as Jean McDowell, Davis's mother
- Jasmine Aiyana Garvin as Katy Owens, Owens's daughter who seeks to become a racer
- Jack Alcott as Randy, Davis's friend who helps him with his car
- Nick Nolte as Arthur Liptin, the co-founder of LAM, a pioneer visual effects company, who Charlie befriends
- Cherry Jones as Laura, the co-founder of LAM
- Luis Guzmán as Raoul, LAM's archivist
- Rowan Blanchard as Lily Albern, an actress who worked on LAM's first film
- Tim Russ as Max, the co-founder of LAM
- Joseph Gordon-Levitt as Trey Nelson, a wealthy man on house arrest for insider trading
- David Castañeda as Jimmy Silva, Trey's estranged friend who runs a lodge
- Stephanie Hsu as Mortimer "Morty" Bernstein, a drifter and petty thief that crosses paths with Charlie
- Clea DuVall as Emily Cale, Charlie's estranged sister

==== Season 2 ====
- Cynthia Erivo as the Kazinsky sisters:
  - Amber Kazinsky, an aspiring artist and the primary caretaker for her mother, Norma
  - Bebe Kazinsky, a disc jockey
  - Cece Kazinsky, a professor of comparative literature
  - Delia "Dee Dee" Kazinsky, an employee at an apple orchard
  - Felicity Price, a mixed media artist
- Jin Ha as Paul Fletcher, a lawyer
- Jasmine Guy as Norma Kazinsky, the Kazinsky sisters' mother
- Giancarlo Esposito as Fred Finch, the director of a funeral home and Greta's husband
- Kevin Corrigan as Tommy Sullivan, a casting director on a film set
- Katie Holmes as Greta Finch, Fred's wife
- John Mulaney as Daniel "Danny" Clyde-Otis, an FBI agent
- Richard Kind as Jeffrey Hasp, Beatrix Hasp's husband
- Chris Bauer as Hooper, a Special Agent
- Gaby Hoffmann as Fran Lamont, a Florida police officer
- Kumail Nanjiani as Joseph "Gator Joe" Pilson, a Florida police officer and TikTok personality with a pet alligator
- John Sayles as Chief Hal, a Florida police officer
- Simon Rex as "Rocket" Russ Waddell, a once-popular baseball player who has lost the ability to throw a fastball
- Brandon Perea as Felix Domingo, a highly skilled baseball player
- Gil Birmingham as Skip, team manager of the Cheesemongers, a local minor league baseball team
- Carol Kane as Lucille, Hiram Lubinski's granddaughter and the manager of Velvety Canned Cheese Park
- Ego Nwodim as Gilda Deacon, the sports commentator for Velvety Canned Cheese Park
- B. J. Novak as Hiram Lubinski, the creator of Velvety Canned Cheese
- Noah Segan as Lew Dundee, the catcher for the Cheesemongers
- Eva Jade Halford as Stephanie Pearce, a high-achieving student at a private elementary school
- Callum Vinson as Elijah Turner, one of Stephanie's classmates
- David Krumholtz as JB Turner, Elijah's father and the janitor of the private school
- Margo Martindale as Dr. Hamm, the principal of the private school
- Adrienne C. Moore as Miss Dee, the teacher of the class that Stephanie and Elijah are in
- Sam Richardson as Kendall Hines, an employee at a big-box store called SuperSave
- Corey Hawkins as Bill Jackson, the manager of SuperSave
- James Ransone as Juice, an impulsive thief
- Geraldine Viswanathan as Jenny, an employee at an Indian restaurant
- Melanie Lynskey as Regina "Reggie" Galvary, the treasurer for the National Orphan Fund
- John Cho as Guy, a con artist
- Awkwafina as Madeline "Maddy" St. Marie, a bicycle messenger
- Alia Shawkat as Amelia Peek/Kate Forster, Anne's new girlfriend
- Lauren Tom as Anne St. Marie, Maddy's grandmother and a retired poetry professor
- David Alan Grier as Otto, the superintendent of the building that Anne and Maddy live in
- Myra Lucretia Taylor as Noreen, a woman who often sits outside the apartment building
- Cliff "Method Man" Smith as Frank "Brick" Bricatino, the owner and manager of a health club in Brooklyn called The Brick House.
- Jason Ritter as Rodney Schomburg, a health inspector who frequents The Brick House
- Natasha Leggero as Lily Bricatino, Frank's wife
- Justin Theroux as Todd Tolocci, a high school teacher who is later impersonated by a highly skilled, master-of-disguise assassin.
- Lili Taylor as FBI Agent Darville
- Haley Joel Osment as Kirby Kowalczyk, Beatrix Hasp's son
- Taylor Schilling as FBI Agent Annie Milligan

== Episodes ==
Season	Episodes	Originally released	
Season	Episodes	First released	Last released
1	10	January 26, 2023	March 9, 2023
2	12	May 8, 2025	July 10, 2025

=== Season 1 (2023) ===
No. overall	No. in season	Title	Directed by	Written by	Original release date
1	1	"Dead Man's Hand"	Rian Johnson	Rian Johnson	January 26, 2023
Laughlin, Nevada casino waitress Charlie Cale, a woman with the ability to tell if someone is lying, observes her maid friend Natalie Hill's abusive husband Jerry being ejected by head of security Cliff LeGrand. Manager Sterling Frost Jr. asks Charlie to help him scam client Kazimir Caine. Natalie discovers child pornography on Caine's computer. When she reports it to Frost, he deletes the evidence on her phone and has Cliff kill her and Jerry, staging it as a murder-suicide by using Jerry's gun. Charlie notices that Jerry's gun was in his right hand in a crime scene photo, although his ankle holster is on his left ankle. Charlie steals Natalie's tablet, finds the deleted evidence in the tablet's trash and presents it to Frost, believing Caine was responsible for Natalie's murder. She realizes Cliff kept Jerry's gun when she sees footage of the metal detector not going off as Jerry was removed. She reveals to Frost that she recorded him as he set up the scam poker game and sent it to Caine, irreparably damaging the casino's reputation. Frost commits suicide and Frost Sr. later calls Charlie, promising to kill her. Guest stars: Adrien Brody, Dascha Polanco and Noah Segan
2	2	"The Night Shift"	Rian Johnson	Alice Ju	January 26, 2023
Charlie's car breaks down in New Mexico and she gives it to mechanic Jed. Both he and Subway worker Damian have a crush on convenience store clerk Sara. When he realizes Damian has won the lottery, Jed pushes him off the body shop's roof, bludgeoning him to death with a crowbar. He takes the lottery ticket and hides the body in the vehicle of a passing trucker, Marge. She discovers it and tries to get rid of it, and Jed calls the police to frame her. Charlie's car is fixed, but Marge is blamed for Damian's murder and Jed claims the ticket is his. After he lies that Damian never won the lottery, Charlie reviews the body shop's security footage and notices it skips an hour. When she points out that the ticket's serial number does not match the time Jed claims to have bought it, he admits to the murder but has discovered that she is a person of interest and threatens to report her if she calls the police. As she leaves, a hidden camera radio show leads her to realize that a trucker she sat next to during Damian's murder would have caught the crime on his dash cam, asking his friends to turn the footage in to the police. Sara misdirects an arriving Cliff and Jed burns the ticket as the police arrive to arrest him. Guest stars: Hong Chau, Megan Suri, Colton Ryan, John Ratzenberger, Brandon Micheal Hall, and Chelsea Frei
3	3	"The Stall"	Iain B. MacDonald	Wyatt Cain	January 26, 2023
In Texas, a stray dog that follows Charlie eats barbecue at an outdoor restaurant run by the Boyle brothers. The business-minded Taffy Boyle demands Charlie pay for what it ate, so she takes a job there and bonds with head chef George Boyle. He is deeply moved when she shows him the film Okja and plans to give up his stake in the business. Unable to afford buying him out, Taffy pre-records a segment for his radio show and pretends to air it live while he seals George in his trailer and suffocates him with grill smoke, beating the dog when it attacks him as he leaves. Charlie finds the dog as she leaves town, realizing that the wood it was beaten with is the same wood that created the smoke that killed George and was only used by him. After confirming Taffy had time to kill George during the broadcast, she brings her findings to Mandy, George's wife, and realizes she is in on it. Charlie has station employee Austin impersonate Taffy over the phone to trick Mandy into thinking he is going to confess, prompting her to sell him out to the police. Austin plays her call on air in front of the police, getting them both arrested, and Charlie leaves the dog with him as she departs. Guest stars: Lil Rel Howery, Danielle Macdonald, Shane Paul McGhie, and Larry Brown
4	4	"Rest in Metal"	Tiffany Johnson	Christine Boylan	January 26, 2023
Charlie is hired by heavy metal band Doxxxology to sell merchandise on tour. She befriends the band's new drummer Gavin, who enjoys writing lyrics based on things around him. The group's original members, desperate to escape their one hit wonder "Staplehead", spot an opportunity to revive their stardom when Gavin presents the band with a catchy song called "Sucker Punch". Unwilling to let Gavin reap all the song's royalties, the band rigs Gavin's amplifier to fatally electrocute him when Ruby lets him sing "Staplehead" and then pass "Sucker Punch" off as their own creation. Charlie realizes the lyrics are based on items in Gavin's trash and learns that the band was wearing rubber soles after finding a camera Gavin set up to record his footwork. Charlie confronts the band for killing Gavin but is forced to flee when a video of her punching a band's promotional mascot goes viral, allowing Cliff to track her down. "Sucker Punch" revives interest in Doxxxology, but their lawyer informs them that the song's melody was directly taken from a TV show theme, prompting legal action if they continue to perform it. Compounding their misery, Charlie sends evidence of the band's murder plot to a true crime podcaster that she met on tour. Guest stars: Chloë Sevigny, Nicholas Cirillo, Chuck Cooper, and John Darnielle
5	5	"Time of the Monkey"	Lucky McKee	Wyatt Cain & Charlie Peppers	February 2, 2023
While working at a retirement home, Charlie befriends ex-felon residents Joyce Harris and Irene Smothers. They tell her of their past as cult members and lovers of their leader Gabriel until a police raid sent them to prison. They recognize a new resident as Gabriel, who reveals he sold the cult out to the authorities and begs forgiveness. Irene sneaks into his room and poisons him, switching his wearable heart monitor and having Joyce tase her to trick the orderly into thinking he died of cardiac arrest. Charlie bumps into Gabriel's "nephew" Luca Clark at his funeral, who admits he is an FBI agent with witness protection and explains that Irene and Joyce were actually arrested trying to bomb a Model UN meeting. A nosy resident tells Charlie that she saw Joyce tasing Irene, prompting them to kill her with a bomb. Charlie informs them that Gabriel's heart rate did not change when staff defibrillated him. They try to kill her, but the waiting FBI are alerted when she tases herself while wearing a heart monitor. When Charlie later starts a golf cart, she narrowly avoids death when it explodes, giving the women the middle finger as they are taken away by the police. Guest stars: Judith Light, S. Epatha Merkerson, K Callan, Reed Birney, Simon Helberg, and Darius Fraser
6	6	"Exit Stage Death"	Ben Sinclair	Chris Downey	February 9, 2023
Actress Kathleen Townsend visits her longtime nemesis and former costar Michael Graves to ask him for help putting on a one-night play and revitalizing her career. He reluctantly accepts after his wealthy wife Ava encourages him. Fed up with each other during the show, they rig a light and trapdoor to kill each other. Michael has a heart attack when the light misses him, and Ava falls to her death through the trapdoor when she runs to give him his medication. The show turns out to be an elaborate setup to kill Ava so they could be together. The show's popularity prompts Kathleen to give it another day, while the third actor Rebecca extorts them for money when she finds the script for the planned argument. Charlie, a waitress at the venue, determines the two are in love through their performances and learns that they rigged the stage earlier. Kathleen tries to kill Rebecca via her fatal nut allergy by contaminating a bowl of snack food. Charlie runs onstage and knocks over the bowl, pretending it is part of the play. Kathleen and Michael have an argument backstage, which Charlie records. Charlie plays their admission of guilt to the sheriff in the audience. Knowing she will soon be arrested, Kathleen uses this moment to give a stellar final performance, then falls through the trap door. Guest stars: Ellen Barkin, Tim Meadows, Audrey Corsa, Jameela Jamil, Niall Cunningham, and Chris McKinney
7	7	"The Future of the Sport"	Iain B. MacDonald	Story by : Joe Lawson & CS Fischer; Teleplay by : Joe Lawson	February 16, 2023
Aging Tennessee racer Keith Owens loses to young Davis McDowell. Owens, suffering from shaking hands when he races, had planned on retiring but decides he cannot retire without winning another race. His daughter Katy who had expected to take over racing for her dad becomes irate that she now has to wait and challenges Davis in go-karting. She wins every round, making Davis mad enough that he goes to her parents' home and vandalizes their mail box. Owens then sabotages Davis's car, but Davis witnesses this and sabotages it further. At a practice session, he lets Katy drive his car and it crashes, putting her in a coma. Having befriended Charlie and knowing of her lie detection ability, he shifts the blames to Owens, who publicly confesses his guilt when confronted. Charlie notices Davis lying about Katy's crash being an accident, and he catches her looking through his garage. He tries to run her off the road after refusing to answer his questions. At his next race, she tells him that Katy woke up and will race him after she recovers, and as she leaves, his hands start to shake. Guest stars: Tim Blake Nelson, Charles Melton, Leslie Silva, Angel Desai, Jasmine Aiyana Garvin, and Jack Alcott
8	8	"The Orpheus Syndrome"	Natasha Lyonne	Natasha Lyonne & Alice Ju	February 23, 2023
Max, the founder of visual effects company LAM, confronts co-founder Laura over something he found in old footage, so she poisons him. Charlie befriends the third co-founder, Arthur Liptin, and begins working as his assistant. He admits that he still blames himself for the death of Lilly Albert, an actress who drowned on the set of the first film he directed. Laura asks Arthur for a bust of Max's head to grieve, but actually uses it to pass the facial recognition software on his laptop and delete a piece of footage from the archives. Arthur watches the physical copy of the footage and realizes that Laura caused Lilly's death, burning the reel when confronted but keeping the incriminating frames, only to die from poisoning upon returning home. Charlie realizes Laura is lying about Max and Arthur's deaths. Laura takes Arthur's things for a memorial exhibit at LAM's offices but misses the hidden footage, which Charlie retrieves. As Laura memorializes Arthur and Max at the opening, Charlie plays the footage on the screen behind her to the large crowd. Laura flees, seeing visions of Arthur and Max and following the latter over a balcony to her death. Guest stars: Nick Nolte, Cherry Jones, Luis Guzmán, Rowan Blanchard, and Tim Russ
9	9	"Escape from Shit Mountain"	Rian Johnson	Nora Zuckerman & Lilla Zuckerman	March 2, 2023
While stranded in the Colorado mountains, Charlie picks up kleptomaniac drifter Mortimer "Morty" Bernstein and crashes her car while trying to avoid a deer. When Morty does not return with a tow truck, she tries to flag down a car and is hit by Trey Nelson, who is violating his house arrest while on parole. He drives her to his estranged friend Jimmy Silva's motel and has him help bury her outside. Charlie wakes up with a broken leg and crawls to the motel door just as Morty arrives in her car. As a blizzard traps the four in the motel, Morty realizes that Charlie found a bone outside and wonders if it could belong to Chloe Jones, a local woman who vanished a decade prior. She finds Chloe's remains where Charlie was buried, and she agrees to keep quiet in exchange for Trey's car when confronted. He beats her and pushes the car off a cliff with her inside. Jimmy intends to drug Charlie with a sedative, but she realizes he is lying about the pills being a painkiller and instead puts them into Trey's cup which is sitting on the table. Joey and Trey argue about their roles in Chloe's death. After Charlie convinces Jimmy that Trey killed Chloe, Trey shoots him and stabs Charlie, burying them with Chloe. Trey arrives home just in time to meet with his parole officer, only to realize that Charlie swiped his ankle monitor when they fought. In the hospital, Charlie learns that Trey was arrested and Morty was mistaken for her. She thinks the world will think she is dead, but Cliff waits for her outside the hospital. Guest stars: Joseph Gordon-Levitt, David Castañeda, and Stephanie Hsu
10	10	"The Hook"	Janicza Bravo	Rian Johnson	March 9, 2023
Tired of his year-long pursuit of Charlie, Cliff makes a deal with Frost Sr.'s rival Beatrix Hasp to kill him. Alerted to Charlie's location by news of her "death," he finds her room and calls Frost Sr., who orders him to wait months until she heals. Cliff forces her into the car when she leaves, trying to goad her into killing him with his gun and taking her to Hasp's Atlantic City casino. Frost Sr. reveals that he has all casinos wiretapped and learned that Frost Jr. was dealing with Hasp, no longer blaming Charlie for his son's death and asking for her help with Hasp. The lights go out and Cliff kills him with the gun Charlie touched before planting it on her. She hides out in her estranged sister's house, who gives her the keys to their father's boat and asks her to leave, not wanting her family involved with Charlie. She finds the boat too damaged to escape on and reluctantly calls Cliff, who asks her to meet him on his boat, calling the police beforehand to have her arrested. She finds poker chips that glow under blacklight and realizes he used them to see Frost Sr. in the dark. She fights with Cliff and jumps off the boat to escape just as the FBI arrive. Charlie had previously sent the FBI Sterling Frost Sr.'s recording of Frost Jr. ordering Natalie killed. Cliff testifies against Hasp and Charlie's name is cleared, only for Hasp to call her and give her the choice between working for her or dying. Charlie destroys her phone and flees. Guest stars: Ron Perlman, Simon Helberg, Clea DuVall, and Rhea Perlman (voice only)

=== Season 2 (2025) ===
No. overall	No. in season	Title	Directed by	Written by	Original release date
11	1	"The Game Is a Foot"	Rian Johnson	Laura Deeley	May 8, 2025
Amber Kazinsky, a former child actress, cares for Norma, her abusive, dying mother. Norma cuts Amber and her sisters, Bebe, Cece and Delia, out of her will in favour of Felicity Price. Amber discovers Felicity is a long-lost sister. After Norma dies, Amber changes her appearance to resemble Felicity and lures her to a bluff where she pushes her to her death. She severs the corpse's leg with a train after discovering Felicity had a prosthetic foot. Amber sends her siblings a video pretending she is committing suicide. As "Felicity", Amber shows up at Norma's funeral to claim her inheritance. Charlie, still running from Hasp's assassins, is a friend of Delia, accompanying her to the funeral. She immediately detects that "Felicity" lies whenever she talks about herself. Amber poses as Delia to sign a settlement agreement where the siblings agree not to contest Felicity's claim. As "Delia", Amber discovers Charlie's ability. She uses this to throw Charlie off with a powerful, truthful monologue as Felicity. However, Charlie and Delia discover the forged signature. Charlie realizes Felicity's artwork is foot-related and discovers her disability. Confronting Amber, Charlie exposes her by stabbing her in the foot. The police arrive, having identified Felicity's body via fingerprints. Amber is arrested, and the remaining sisters get Norma's money. Charlie flees when Hasp's hitmen find her again. Guest stars: Cynthia Erivo, Jin Ha, Jasmine Guy, and Anthony DeSando
12	2	"Last Looks"	Natasha Lyonne	Alice Ju & Natasha Lyonne	May 8, 2025
A horror film is being shot at a Florida funeral home owned and run by Fred and Greta Finch. Greta, feeling trapped in the marriage, asks for a divorce. A devastated Fred murders Greta when she returns from a night of drinking with friends. He uses the horror set to cover up his crime and transport Greta's cremated remains. Charlie, working as an extra on set, was one of the friends Greta had gone drinking with. She had promised to drive Greta to Miami the following morning, but awakes to discover her gone. Fred claims Greta was leaving him, but Charlie grows suspicious when she sees Fred dancing to a "funeral song" he had made for Greta. However, Fred inadvertently answers questions in ways that do not trigger Charlie's ability. Stuck, Charlie interviews the film crew and investigates the home with Tommy, the location manager. Charlie confronts Fred, nearly extracting a confession until Tommy receives a "text" from Greta. A guilty Charlie consoles Fred, but she discovers Greta's phone in his desk. Fred chloroforms Charlie and traps her in a coffin, intending to cremate her. However, Charlie escapes and starts a fire that spreads rapidly. Rather than abandon his beloved funeral home, Fred elects to die in the flames. Charlie tries to drive away but is captured by Beatrix Hasp before she can do so. Guest stars: Giancarlo Esposito, Kevin Corrigan, Katie Holmes, Kathrine Narducci, and Sherry Cola
13	3	"Whack-A-Mole"	Miguel Arteta	Wyatt Cain	May 8, 2025
Beatrix reveals her organisation is crumbling because of Cliff's testimony. Wanting to flee the country, Beatrix needs Charlie to use her power to determine which of her crew is an FBI informant. Charlie determines the capos and Beatrix's husband Jeffrey are clean. However, before the crew can escape via plane, the FBI (including Luca) raid the airfield. Luca shoots Jeffrey. A day earlier, Beatrix speaks with her mole in the FBI, Agent Daniel Clyde-Otis. The rat in Beatrix's crew is Jeffrey, who wants out of the criminal lifestyle. Charlie realized Jeffrey was the rat but covered for him. When pressed about the FBI mole, Jeffrey recognises Daniel but withholds his name until he is placed in witness protection. Luca agrees to help Jeffrey fake his death by "shooting" him with blanks. Unbeknownst to Luca, Daniel observed their conversation and replaced a blank bullet with a live one. During the raid, Luca fires the live bullet into Jeffrey, killing him. Furious, Beatrix takes Charlie hostage on the plane and subtly threatens to out Daniel if he does not help her escape. Luca and Charlie convince Beatrix to give up Daniel's identity. Daniel boards the plane and takes all three hostage, but is overpowered and apprehended after a fight. Beatrix agrees to go into witness protection in return for testimony and cancelling her hit on Charlie. Guest stars: John Mulaney, Rhea Perlman, Richard Kind, Chris Bauer, Simon Helberg, RJ Brown, and Gregg Bello
14	4	"The Taste of Human Blood"	Lucky McKee	Wyatt Cain	May 15, 2025
Gaby Hoffman stars as Officer Fran who is a successful Florida Cop, but is constantly thwarted by her nemesis, Gator Joe (Kumail Nanjiani). After losing the cop of the year for the 7th year, she tries to embarrass Gator Joe by giving him a laxative, but accidentally kills him. Charlie, working as a caterer who is trying to free Gator Joe's alligator, accidentally discovers Fran's secret. The two release the alligator (Daisy) and Charlie convinces Fran to turn herself in. Her boss refuses to accept her confession so Fran resigns and takes a job volunteering at a local gator sanctuary. Guest stars: Gaby Hoffmann, Kumail Nanjiani, Steve Buscemi (voice only), Shiloh Fernandez, John Sayles, and Matt Passmore
15	5	"Hometown Hero"	John Dahl	Tony Tost	May 22, 2025
Guest stars: Simon Rex, Brandon Perea, Steve Buscemi (voice only), Gil Birmingham, Carol Kane, Ego Nwodim, B. J. Novak, Noah Segan, and Ruffin Prentiss
16	6	"Sloppy Joseph"	Adam Arkin	Kate Thulin	May 29, 2025
Guest stars: Eva Jade Halford, Callum Vinson, David Krumholtz, Adrienne C. Moore and Margo Martindale
17	7	"One Last Job"	Adam Arkin	Taofik Kolade	June 5, 2025
Guest stars: Sam Richardson, Corey Hawkins, James Ransone, Geraldine Viswanathan, Abena, Grasie Mercedes, and Jordan Dean
18	8	"The Sleazy Georgian"	Mimi Cave	Megan Amram	June 12, 2025
Guest stars: Melanie Lynskey, John Cho, Brendan Sexton III, Joel Marsh Garland, GaTa, and Eric Satterberg
19	9	"A New Lease on Death"	Adamma Ebo	Tea Ho and Wyatt Cain	June 19, 2025
Guest stars: Awkwafina, Alia Shawkat, Lauren Tom, Patti Harrison, Steve Buscemi (voice only), David Alan Grier, Myra Lucretia Taylor, and Pej Vahdat
20	10	"The Big Pump"	Clea DuVall	Raphie Cantor	June 26, 2025
Guest stars: Cliff "Method Man" Smith, Jason Ritter, Patti Harrison, Natasha Leggero, and Myra Lucretia Taylor
21	11	"The Day of the Iguana"	Ti West	Andrew Sodroski	July 3, 2025
Guest stars: Justin Theroux, Lili Taylor, Patti Harrison, Haley Joel Osment, Taylor Schilling, Simon Helberg, and Rhea Perlman
22	12	"The End of the Road"	Natasha Lyonne	Laura Deeley	July 10, 2025
Guest stars: Justin Theroux, Lili Taylor, Patti Harrison, Haley Joel Osment, Taylor Schilling, Simon Helberg, Rhea Perlman, and Adam Arkin

== Production ==
Promotional posters for season 1 (left), and season 2 (right)

=== Development ===
The project was announced in March 2021, with Rian Johnson serving as creator, writer, director and executive producer. Johnson stated that the series would delve into "the type of fun, character driven, case-of-the-week mystery goodness I grew up watching." The series was inspired by Columbo, being referred as a "howcatchem". Johnson also used Magnum, P.I., The Rockford Files, Quantum Leap, Highway to Heaven and The Incredible Hulk as influences for the tone of the series. Johnson was interested in "doing that Columbo or even Quantum Leap thing of having every episode be an anthropological deep dive into a little corner of America that you might not otherwise see." On February 15, 2023, Peacock renewed the series for a second season. On November 13, 2025, Peacock canceled the series after two seasons, with Lyonne leaving the series. The series is being shopped to other networks for a two-season commitment, with Peter Dinklage replacing Lyonne as Charlie Cale.

=== Casting ===
The announcement of the series included that Natasha Lyonne would serve as the main lead actress. She was approached by Johnson about working on a procedural project together, with Lyonne as the lead character. As Johnson explained, the role was "completely cut to measure for her." While the series and lead character would share things in common with Columbo, the writers sought to differentiate the lead character by having her work outside of the law. Due to the series' procedural aspects, the episodes feature several guest stars. Johnson was inspired by the number of actors who guest starred on Columbo, wanting to deem each guest star as the star of the episode, which allowed them to attract many actors.

In April 2022, Benjamin Bratt joined the series. Instead of a guest role, his character would recur as Cliff, the head of security at a casino where Charlie works. When she escapes the casino, his character would go after her, which Bratt called "a ticking clock for the show". In July 2024, Giancarlo Esposito, Katie Holmes, Gaby Hoffmann, Kumail Nanjiani, Kathrine Narducci, Ben Marshall, Kevin Corrigan, and Sherry Cola were cast in guest roles for the second season. Cynthia Erivo, Margo Martindale, and B. J. Novak also joined the guest cast in September. In October, John Mulaney, Ego Nwodim, and Sam Richardson were cast in guest roles for the second season.

=== Filming ===
According to the director of the Hudson Valley Film Commission, filming was based in Newburgh, New York, and ran from April through October 2022, in locations throughout the mid-Hudson Valley. At least one episode of the series was filmed in late August 2022 in Albuquerque, New Mexico. Outdoor scenes were filmed in Laughlin, Nevada, in September 2022, with the Riverside Resort Hotel & Casino depicting the fictional Frost Casino. Filming for the second season started on July 1, 2024, and wrapped in late December 2024. Filming locations included Clover Stadium in Pomona, New York.

== Release ==
Poker Face premiered on January 26, 2023, on Peacock, with the first four episodes available immediately and the rest debuting on a weekly basis. The second season premiered on May 8, 2025, with the first three episodes available immediately and the rest debuting on a weekly basis. International sales are handled by Paramount Global Content Distribution. The series is available on Stan in Australia and on Citytv+ and Citytv in Canada. It began streaming on CBC Gem in Canada in February 2024. The series debuted in Asia via Rock Entertainment on May 24, 2023. The series then debuted in the United Kingdom on Sky Max on May 26, 2023. Paramount also handled home media distribution for the series, with Paramount Home Entertainment releasing the first season exclusively on Blu-ray on September 12, 2023. The first season debuted on USA Network on March 9, 2025.

== Reception ==
=== Critical response ===
Critical response of Poker Face
Season	Rotten Tomatoes	Metacritic
1	98% (116 reviews)	84 (44 reviews)
2	96% (77 reviews)	79 (26 reviews)

On the review aggregation website Rotten Tomatoes, the overall series holds a 97% rating. Meanwhile, on Metacritic, which uses a weighted average, the overall series received a score of 83 out of 100.

==== Season 1 ====
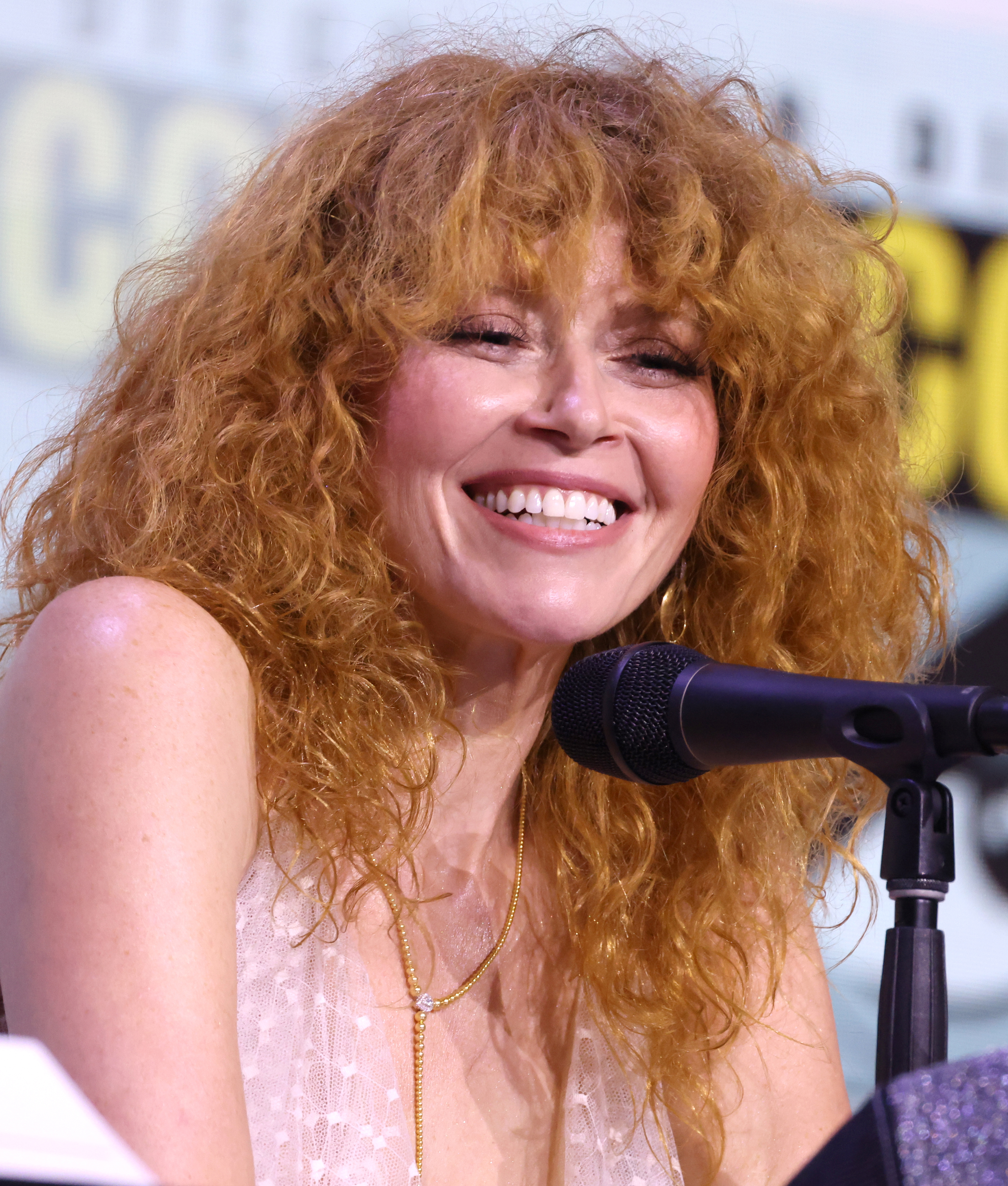
Natasha Lyonne garnered acclaim for her performance.

Poker Face was met with critical acclaim upon release. The review aggregator website Rotten Tomatoes reported a 98% approval rating for the first season based on 116 critic reviews. The website's critics consensus reads, "With the incomparable Natasha Lyonne as an ace up its sleeve, Poker Face is a puzzle box of modest ambitions working with a full deck." Metacritic, which uses a weighted average, assigned a score of 84 out of 100 based on 44 critics, indicating "universal acclaim".

Chicago Sun-Times's Richard Roeper gave a rating of 3.5 out of 4 stars and said, "The beauty part is watching the amazing Natasha Lyonne's Charlie puzzle out the crime in clever and often hilarious fashion." Peter Travers of ABC News felt Lyonne landed "the role of her career" in Charlie Cale and called Poker Face "the best joyride of the 2023 TV season." Linda Holmes of NPR felt Lyonne's "unforgettable" performance proved herself to be the "Peter Falk of her generation". Ben Travers of IndieWire gave the series a B and stated "All this star power is enough to guarantee Poker Face will be, at least, an enjoyable diversion. But... it's hard to shake the feeling that Poker Face isn't as good as it could've been." The Atlantic's Sophie Gilbert believed the show succeeded in its first episodes "by attending to the emotional cadences of overlooked people and places" but criticized the characters of later episodes for falling into tropes.

==== Season 2 ====
The second season also received critical acclaim. The review aggregator website Rotten Tomatoes reported a 96% approval rating based on 77 critic reviews. The website's critics consensus states, "Instead of reshuffling its winning formula, Poker Face's second season doubles down on the winning virtues of its predecessor and scores a jackpot." Metacritic, which uses a weighted average, assigned a score of 79 out of 100 based on 26 critics, indicating "generally favorable reviews".

Empire's David Opie awarded the second season with four out of five stars, stating, "The case-of-the-week format remains in place, mostly unchanged, but the serialised story that holds it together becomes more introspective and even existential, proving that the team's ambition isn't just limited to casting TV's most enviable guest list. If the impressive highs of Season 2 are anything to go by, Poker Face could easily go on for ten more seasons and just get better each time. (No lies detected.)" Consequence's Liz Shannon Miller wrote, "It's all so thoughtfully written and executed, at times to the point of devastation, though Charlie remains the show's emotional anchor, keeping the audience from drifting into despair. So much of this show works simply because we just like Charlie — and can see why other people like and trust her in a relatively short amount of time."

=== Accolades ===
Year	Category	Nominated work	Result	Ref.
American Film Institute Awards
2023	Top 10 Television Programs	Poker Face	Won (Note: This award does not have a single winner, but recognizes multiple programs.)	
Art Directors Guild Awards
2023	Outstanding Production Design for a Contemporary Single-Camera Series	Judy Rhee (for "Escape from Shit Mountain")	Nominated	
Artios Awards
2024	Outstanding Casting – Television Comedy Pilot or First Season	Poker Face (Note: Mary Vernieu, Bret Howe, Christine Kromer, Angelique Midthunder, and Derek Hersey)	Nominated	
Black Reel TV Awards
2023	Outstanding Guest Performance, Comedy Series	Lil Rel Howery	Nominated	
2023	Outstanding Guest Performance, Comedy Series	S. Epatha Merkerson	Nominated	
Critics' Choice Television Awards
2024	Best Comedy Series	Poker Face	Nominated	
2024	Best Actress in a Comedy Series	Natasha Lyonne	Nominated	
Golden Globe Awards
2024	Best Actress – Television Series Musical or Comedy	Natasha Lyonne	Nominated	
Golden Trailer Awards
2023	Best Comedy for a TV/Streaming Series (Trailer/Teaser/TV Spot)	"Fresh Starts" (Project X/AV)	Nominated	
Hollywood Critics Association TV Awards
2023	Best Streaming Series, Comedy	Poker Face	Nominated	
2023	Best Actress in a Streaming Series, Comedy	Natasha Lyonne	Nominated	
2023	Best Supporting Actor in a Streaming Series, Comedy	Benjamin Bratt	Nominated	
2023	Best Directing in a Streaming Series, Comedy	Rian Johnson (for "Escape from Shit Mountain")	Nominated	
2023	Best Writing in a Streaming Series, Comedy	Rian Johnson (for "Dead Man's Hand")	Nominated	
2023	Best Guest Actor in a Comedy Series	Simon Helberg	Nominated	
2023	Best Guest Actress in a Comedy Series	Hong Chau	Nominated	
2023	Best Guest Actress in a Comedy Series	Stephanie Hsu	Nominated	
2023	Best Contemporary Costumes	Poker Face	Nominated	
Make-Up Artists and Hair Stylists Guild Awards
2024	Best Contemporary Make-Up in Television	Poker Face (Note: Amy L. Forsythe, Heidi Pakdel-Payan, Rebecca Levine, and Shannon Dollison)	Nominated	
Primetime Emmy Awards
2023	Outstanding Lead Actress in a Comedy Series	Natasha Lyonne	Nominated	
2023	Outstanding Guest Actress in a Comedy Series	Judith Light (for "Time of the Monkey")	Won	
2023	Outstanding Production Design for a Narrative Contemporary Program	Judy Rhee, Martha Sparrow, and Cathy Marshall (for "The Orpheus Syndrome")	Nominated	
2023	Outstanding Stunt Coordination for a Comedy Series or Variety Program	Tom Place	Nominated	
2025	Outstanding Guest Actress in a Comedy Series	Cynthia Erivo (for "The Game Is a Foot")	Nominated	
2025	Outstanding Stunt Coordination for Comedy Programming	Tom Place	Nominated	
2026	Outstanding Stunt Coordination for Comedy Programming	Tom Place	Nominated	
Set Decorators Society of America Awards
2022	Best Decor/Design of a One Hour Contemporary Series	Cathy T. Marshall, Elizabeth Eggert, and Judy Rhee	Nominated	
2024	Best Achievement in Décor/Design of a One Hour Contemporary Series	Cathy T. Marshall, Heather Loeffle, and Judy Rhee	Nominated	
Television Critics Association Awards
2023	Program of the Year	Poker Face	Nominated	
2023	Outstanding New Program	Poker Face	Nominated	
2023	Outstanding Achievement in Comedy	Poker Face	Nominated	
2023	Individual Achievement in Comedy	Natasha Lyonne	Won	
Writers Guild of America Awards
2024	New Series	Poker Face (Note: Christine Boylan, Wyatt Cain, Chris Downey, CS Fischer, Rian Johnson, Alice Ju, Joe Lawson, Natasha Lyonne, Charlie Peppers, Lilla Zuckerman, and Nora Zuckerman)	Nominated	
2024	Episodic Comedy	Nora Zuckerman and Lilla Zuckerman (for "Escape from Shit Mountain")	Won	
