= Danielle Macdonald =

Australian actress (born 1991)

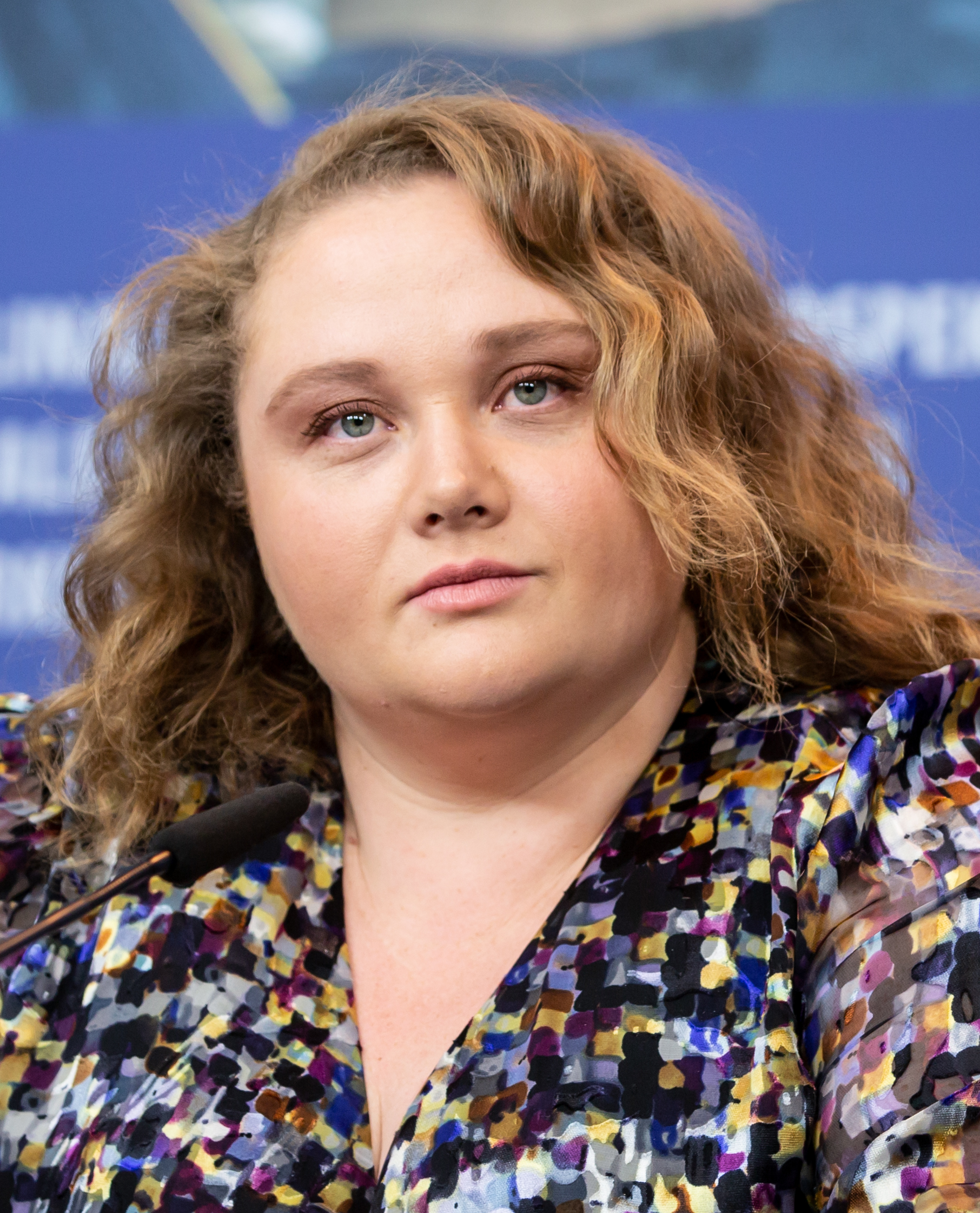
- Macdonald in 2019
- Born: Danielle Louise Macdonald; 19 May 1991 (age 35); Sydney, Australia
- Education: Australian Institute for Performing Arts
- Occupation: Actress
- Years active: 2010–present

Danielle Louise Macdonald (born 19 May 1991) is an Australian actress. After moving to America at the age of 18 to pursue her career, she made her acting debut with a variety of small roles on television, before her feature film debut in 2013. She gained wider recognition in 2017 with her first leading role in the drama film Patti Cake$ and a supporting role in Bird Box. Her career continued with her breakthrough role as the titular lead in Dumplin' (2018).

Macdonald has since starred in the films Bird Box, Skin (both 2018), Paradise Hills, I Am Woman (both 2019), French Exit (2020), and If I Had Legs I'd Kick You (2025). She has also acted in the Netflix series Unbelievable (2019), and the BBC One/Stan/HBO Max thriller series The Tourist (2022–2024), and the miniseries The Last Anniversary (2025).

== Early life and education ==
Danielle Louise Macdonald, who is of Italian and Scottish heritage, was born in Sydney in 1991.

Having taken performing arts classes in grade 8, she moved on to improv and screen classes when she was in grade 10. She attended the Australian Institute for Performing Arts in Artarmon, New South Wales. When she was 17, Macdonald took some acting classes in Los Angeles and was encouraged to move to the United States to pursue things further. After deciding that acting would be her life, Danielle moved to Hollywood at age 18.

== Career ==
At the age of 18, Macdonald moved to Los Angeles to pursue an acting career. She was originally booked for the role of Becca Huffstatter in the ABC drama series Huge, but her visa did not come in on time and she was unable to fill the role. Her first feature film was The East, which premiered at the 2013 Sundance Film Festival.

Macdonald is known for her starring role as Alice Manning in the 2014 crime film Every Secret Thing, alongside Dakota Fanning, Diane Lane, and Elizabeth Banks. Regarding Every Secret Thing, Katherine Pushkar from the New York Daily News wrote, "The film actually belongs to Danielle Macdonald, effective as cruel, jealous Alice." Macdonald also had a supporting role in the film Trust Me.

In 2016, she appeared in the season finale of American Horror Story: Roanoke as Bristol Windows. The following year, Macdonald starred opposite Bridget Everett and Cathy Moriarty in the drama film Patti Cake$ as the titular aspiring rapper in New Jersey. After working agentless for the first six years of her career, Macdonald signed with her first Hollywood agent after the success of Patti Cake$.

In December 2017, Macdonald appeared in the Netflix comedy series Easy, playing the role of a teenager who retaliates against her wealthy parents when they force her to go to church every week.

In 2018, Macdonald appeared in two Netflix films, opposite Jennifer Aniston in the adaptation of young adult novel Dumplin', by Julie Murphy; and Bird Box as Olympia, a pregnant woman who tries to survive the arrival of supernatural beings that make people want to kill themselves once they see it. She also portrayed Christa in the Academy Award-winning short drama film Skin.

In 2019, Macdonald appeared as Lillian Roxon in I Am Woman, the biopic of singer Helen Reddy, which showcased her Australian accent. About the role she said "I love that these are two Australian women that decided to go to the States by themselves in a time where that didn't happen, and have a commanding presence and say 'this is what I want to do, this is a career that I want to have.' I obviously moved from Australia when I was 18 to come and pursue a crazy career, so I could understand and relate.".

In 2021, Macdonald starred with Michelle Pfeiffer in French Exit. In the same year, Macdonald starred in the Ben Lewin-directed movie, Falling for Figaro. Macdonald plays Millie, a woman who quits her job to fulfill her dream of becoming an opera singer. She moves to Scotland where she is tutored by fearsome teacher, Meghan Geoffrey-Bishop (Joanna Lumley).

Macdonald starred in the series The Tourist alongside Jamie Dornan and Alex Dimitriades, in 2022. Macdonald plays the character of Helen Chambers, a police officer from a country town who is sent to investigate a man who suffered amnesia after a car crash.

In 2025, Macdonald appeared in the Foxtel series The Last Anniversary.

== Personal life ==
Macdonald was personally affected by the catastrophic summer bushfires in Australia over 2019–20 when her cousin's house burned down. While staying with family in Bateman's Bay over Christmas, Macdonald and her family fled to safety in a car journey that would normally have taken three hours but took 13 hours through the fire-ravaged region.

In September 2020, Macdonald was living with roommates and several rescue pets in Los Angeles. Animal welfare is important to Macdonald. She lived as a pescatarian for five years, choosing to convert to veganism at the beginning of 2020.

== Filmography ==
=== Film ===
Year	Title	Role	Notes
2013	The East	Tess	
2013	Trust Me	Delia	
2014	Every Secret Thing	Alice Manning	
2017	Patti Cake$	Patricia "Patti" Dombrowski	
2017	Lady Bird	Olympia	
2018	Skin	Christa	Short film
2018	Skin	Julie Price	
2018	Bird Box	Olympia	
2018	Dumplin'	Willowdean Dickson	
2019	Paradise Hills	Chloe	
2019	I Am Woman	Lillian Roxon	
2020	French Exit	Madeleine	
2020	Falling for Figaro	Millie	
2025	If I Had Legs I'd Kick You	Caroline	
2026	Saccharine	Josie	
2026	Evil Genius		

=== Television ===
Year	Title	Role	Notes
2011	Glee	Girl No. 1	Episode: "Born This Way"
2013	Newsreaders	Pam Bell	Episode: "Fit Town, Fat Town"
2014	Pretty Little Liars	Cathy Perez	Episode: "Whirly Girly"
2014	Toolies	Sarah Craig	5 episodes
2015	2 Broke Girls	Ashlin	Episode: "And the Knock-Off Knockout"
2015	The Middle	Amy RA	Episode: "Cutting the Cord"
2016	American Horror Story: Roanoke	Bristol Windows	Episode: "Chapter 10"
2017	The Rachels	Ashley	Movie
2017–2019	Easy	Grace	2 episodes
2019	Unbelievable	Amber	Main role
2022–2024	The Tourist	Helen	Main role, won Edinburgh International Television Festival Breakthrough Award
2023	Poker Face	Mandy Boyle	Episode: "The Stall"
2025	The Last Anniversary	Veronika	6 episodes
2025	Law & Order: Special Victims Unit	Natalie Tanzillo	Episode: "Feed the Craving"

=== Music video ===
Year	Title	Artist	Role	Notes
2022	"She"	Jelly Roll	Girl	
