= Nicholas Cirillo =

American actor

- Born: 5 June 1997 (age 29)
- Occupations: Actor, producer
- Years active: 2019–present

Nicholas Cirillo (born 5 June 1997) is an American actor and producer.

== Early life ==
He is from Wilkes County, North Carolina, and was a 2014 graduate of Wilkes Central High School. He trained as an actor at the Actor’s Group in Winston-Salem.

== Career ==
He had an early role in Stranger Things and featured in Hulu series The Act. He had a recurring role as Barry the drug dealer in Netflix series Outer Banks. He had a recurring role as Cousin Ched in Disney+ series She-Hulk: Attorney at Law and appeared as Jennings in Teenage Bounty Hunters. He could be seen as an ill-fated rock drummer in the episode "Rest in Metal" in Peacock’s 2023 mystery crime series Poker Face.

He made his feature film debut as Taylor in the mystery/crime thriller The Giant, which premiered in 2019. His film roles include 2021 film Ida Red, as well as 2023's Jesus Revolution, 2023 adventure comedy film Good Egg, and Kevin Smith comedy The 4:30 Movie. He featured as Allie in Jennifer Esposito 2024 gangster film Fresh Kills alongside Emily Bader.

In 2024, he was cast in series seven of Netflix dystopian drama Black Mirror.

== Personal life ==
His father was a gastroenterologist at Wilkes Medical Center. He has two sisters. He set-up the production company Enzo Entertainment in 2023 with fellow actor Matthew Montemaro whom he met on the set of Jesus Revolution.

== Filmography ==
Year	Title	Role	Notes
2019	The Act	Luke	1 episode
2019	The Giant	Taylor	Film
2019	Stranger Things	Teenager	1 episode
2020	Teenage Bounty Hunters	Jennings	2 episodes
2020–2026	Outer Banks	Barry	14 episodes
2021	Ida Red	Petey	Film
2022	She-Hulk: Attorney at Law	Cousin Ched	4 episodes
2023	Poker Face	Gavin	Episode: "Rest in Metal"
2023	Jesus Revolution	Charlie	Film
2023	Good Egg	Gio	Film
2023	Fresh Kills	Allie	Film
2024	The 4:30 Movie	Burny	Film
2025	Black Mirror	Shane	Episode: "Common People"
2025	Charlie Harper	TBA	Film
2025	Murdaugh: Death in the Family	Connor Cook	Miniseries
