= The Night Shift (Poker Face) =

- Poker Face episode
- Episode no.: Season 1 Episode 2
- Directed by: Rian Johnson
- Written by: Alice Ju
- Cinematography by: Christine Ng
- Editing by: Glenn Garland
- Original release date: January 26, 2023
- Running time: 62 minutes

Guest appearances
- Hong Chau as Marge; Megan Suri as Sara; Colton Ryan as Jed; John Ratzenberger as Abe; Brandon Micheal Hall as Damian; Chelsea Frei as Dana; Benjamin Bratt as Cliff LeGrand

Episode chronology
← Previous "Dead Man's Hand"	Next → "The Stall"

"The Night Shift" is the second episode of the American murder mystery comedy-drama television series Poker Face. The episode was written by consulting producer Alice Ju and directed by series creator Rian Johnson. It was released on Peacock on January 26, 2023, alongside "Dead Man's Hand", "The Stall" and "Rest in Metal".

The series follows Charlie Cale, a woman with the ability to detect if people are lying; after exposing a murder plot at a casino, she is now on the run from the owner's enforcer Cliff LeGrand. In the episode, Charlie flees to New Mexico where her car breaks down, while also befriending a trucker while awaiting repairs. When the trucker is arrested for suspected murder, Charlie sets out to prove her innocence.

The episode received positive reviews from critics, who praised Johnson's directing, performances, character development and pacing.

== Plot ==
In New Mexico, Damian (Brandon Micheal Hall) is a Marine Corps veteran who now works at a Subway. He often visits Sara (Megan Suri), a convenience store clerk whom he has a crush on, to buy a lottery ticket. As part of their routine, Sara lends Damian a state quarter from her collection to scratch the ticket. A young mechanic named Jed (Colton Ryan) is also interested in Sara, although he makes her uncomfortable.

Damian visits Jed to urge him to dial back his behavior, which seems to annoy Jed. Damian suddenly realizes that he finally won $25,000 in the lottery, which prompts Jed to throw him off the roof of his auto shop. He then finishes killing Damian with a blow to the head, although Damian slashes Jed in the calf before dying. After stealing the lottery ticket, Jed disposes of Damian's body by hiding it in a parked semi truck nearby. Returning to his shop, he spies a trucker, Marge (Hong Chau), discover the body and stash it next to a dumpster. He calls the police to report Marge in order to deflect suspicion.

One day prior, Charlie (Natasha Lyonne) is forced to leave her Plymouth Barracuda at the auto shop. The head mechanic, Abe (John Ratzenberger), informs her that the repair will cost $400, which Charlie does not currently have. Abe allows her to keep the Plymouth at the shop under the care of his nephew, Jed. After buying a sandwich from Damian, she stops at a restroom and meets Marge. Charlie then passes out due to blood loss from her gunshot wound shortly after. Marge then treats the wound with superglue and gives Charlie advice on how to go off the grid, telling Charlie to forgo her past life. With no money and nowhere to stay, Charlie is forced to sleep outdoors on a picnic table.

The next day, Charlie returns to the shop and discovers the crime scene, which led to Marge's arrest. Jed returns to the convenience store and buys a lottery ticket, pretending to have won with Damian's ticket. Since Marge told her that she was once tracked to a location within four hours of using an ATM there, Charlie retrieves $460 from the ATM and starts a four-hour timer on her watch, by which time she assumes Cliff will have tracked her. She has her car fixed and prepares to leave. However, she decides to stay after hearing that Marge supposedly "bludgeoned" Damian despite carrying a gun. Charlie reviews footage of the convenience store's cameras and questions Sara. Charlie believes Sara when she says Damian never won the lottery, but realizes Jed is lying when he says the same.

At Subway, Charlie finds a distinct bottle cap in Damian's uniform. She notices a time gap in the auto shop's security footage, during which the camera angle changed and nearby objects were moved. On the rooftop, she finds multiple caps from the same brand as the one found in Damian's uniform, as well as the Hawaii quarter Sara had lent him. Jed shows up, after having his advances rejected by Sara. Charlie confronts him over Damian's visit to the rooftop, and Jed claims that Damian visited him to tell him to leave Sara alone. Checking the scratch-off, she and Sara briefly retrieve the winning ticket. Charlie notes that the serial number of the winning ticket is several numbers behind that of a discarded ticket bought immediately before Jed claimed to have bought the winning ticket, revealing that the winning ticket was actually purchased some time before.

Charlie accuses Jed of murdering Damian. Jed, knowing she is a fugitive, threatens to turn her in to the police. Charlie reluctantly leaves as her timer beeps. However, when she hears about a hidden camera show on the radio, she visits a diner to ask about a trucker with a dashcam that filmed Damian's murder. She manages to identify the trucker and instructs the patrons to contact him and report the killing to the police. Meanwhile, Cliff (Benjamin Bratt) arrives at the convenience store. When he asks Sara about Charlie, she misleads him into thinking that Charlie was heading to Los Angeles after noticing that he is carrying a gun. Abe confronts Jed, pointing out that the brakes on Charlie's car were sabotaged but that he fixed them. Abe implies that he knows what Jed has done. As night falls, Jed burns the lottery ticket as police arrive at the auto shop.

== Production ==
=== Development ===
The series was announced in March 2021, with Rian Johnson serving as creator, writer, director and executive producer. Johnson stated that the series would delve into "the type of fun, character driven, case-of-the-week mystery goodness I grew up watching." The episode was directed by Johnson, while consulting producer Alice Ju wrote it. This was Johnson's second directing credit and Ju's first writing credit.

=== Casting ===
The announcement of the series included that Natasha Lyonne would serve as the main lead actress. She was approached by Johnson about working on a procedural project together, with Lyonne as the lead character. As Johnson explained, the role was "completely cut to measure for her." Benjamin Bratt also joined the series in the recurring role of Cliff, whose character chases Charlie after she runs away from the casino in the previous episode.

Due to the series' procedural aspects, the episodes feature several guest stars. Johnson was inspired by the amount of actors who guest starred on Columbo, wanting to deem each guest star as the star of the episode, which allowed them to attract many actors. The episode featured appearances by Hong Chau, Megan Suri, Colton Ryan, and Brandon Micheal Hall, who were announced to guest star in September 2022. John Ratzenberger also guest stars in the episode as Abe, with Johnson noting that the casting was part of "people coming onscreen that are gonna give you joy". He also added, "We're going for casting that's gonna give you the tingles."

=== Filming ===
The episode was filmed in the outskirts of Albuquerque, New Mexico. For the episode, production designer Judy Rhee and her crew built the Subway where Damian works, as well as Abe's garage. Despite the use of Subway in the episode, the series was not paid for the product placement. Due to the murder nature of the episode, the series asked Subway for permission to use their logo on the series. According to executive producer Nora Zuckerman, many pedestrians stopped by the built-in Subway, believing to be a real Subway.

== Critical reception ==
"The Night Shift" received positive reviews from critics. Saloni Gajjar of The A.V. Club gave the episode a "B+" grade and wrote, "She didn't expect to use her powers for this work, but here we are anyway. Poker Face begins with a luxurious pace as Charlie adapts to her surroundings, but it's a strong start; our patience is well-rewarded in these hourlong episodes."

Alan Sepinwall of Rolling Stone praised the episode, although he felt the episode took too long to place Charlie into the story, "the second episode, involving a trio of people working the night shift at shops next to a truck stop, really only takes off once that familiar mop of strawberry blonde hair comes into view. And even when she turns up, the flashback segments may occasionally leave you impatient to get to the part where Charlie begins poking holes in the killer's story." Amanda Whiting of Vulture gave the episode a 3 star rating out of 5 and wrote, "This risk-taking behavior may be the series' most complicated investigation so far. Charlie isn't Columbo, a homicide cop with open cases to clear. So why does she feel compelled to use her very particular set of skills for the greater good? In episode two, the answer is specific. Marge, a trucker who briefly helps Charlie on the road, ends up falsely accused of murder. Charlie helps, I guess, because she knows Marge to be a good person. Like Sir Galahad himself, she's pure and well intentioned — almost chivalrous, really, if you can accept that sometimes a knight rides a white horse and sometimes a knight is bleeding from the abdomen in a truck-stop bathroom."
