= Fresh Kills (film) =

2023 film by Jennifer Esposito

- Release poster
- Directed by: Jennifer Esposito
- Written by: Jennifer Esposito
- Produced by: Leslie Ann Owen; Jennifer Esposito; Christine Crokos; Samantha Sprecher
- Starring: Emily Bader; Odessa A'zion; Jennifer Esposito; Domenick Lombardozzi; Nicholas Cirillo; Annabella Sciorra
- Cinematography: Ben Hardwicke
- Edited by: Todd Sandler
- Music by: Theodosia Roussos
- Production companies: Rebellious Act Project; Owen Media Group; Faliro House Productions
- Distributed by: Quiver Distribution
- Release dates: June 16, 2023 (Tribeca); June 14, 2024 (United States)
- Running time: 120 minutes
- Country: United States
- Language: English
- Box office: $68,310

Fresh Kills is a 2023 American drama film marking the directorial debut of Jennifer Esposito, who also wrote and co-produced it. The film stars Esposito, Emily Bader, Odessa A'zion, Domenick Lombardozzi, Nicholas Cirillo and Annabella Sciorra.

Fresh Kills was released in the United States on June 14, 2024.

== Plot ==
The Larusso family—father Joe, mother Fran, and sisters Connie and Rose—move from Brooklyn to a new house in Staten Island. The adjustment is difficult: the neighborhood is bleak, Fran is unhappy, and the sisters miss their old life. Tensions simmer immediately when the fiery, protective Connie nearly gets into a fight with movers after they hit young Rose. Behind the facade of a fresh start, Joe is involved in organized crime. Rose and Connie secretly overhear Joe arguing with his associate, Nello, about illegal goods stored in their garage by their incompetent uncle, Nick. Soon after, Nick disappears, sending the first ripple of dread through the family.

The family tries to settle into their new community, attending Catholic school and church, where Connie's aggressive loyalty repeatedly leads to physical confrontations. Rose, more observant and introspective, begins to question their world, especially after being teased at school about her father's dishonesty. A brutal fight between Connie and a rival, Danielle, at a Christmas party underscores the violent code they live by. Rose's doubts create a rift with Connie, who violently insists she must always defend the family. The pressure escalates when Rose witnesses Connie's boyfriend, Bobby, commit a savage act of retaliation. After the sisters are ambushed and beaten, a weary Fran tends to them and reveals painful family history, including her own miscarriage and the truth about Uncle Nick's fate, implying some questions are too dangerous to ask.

In an attempt to provide legitimacy, Joe buys a bakery for Connie and Rose to run. Rose, however, feels increasingly trapped, uncertain about her engagement to Bobby and harboring secret dreams of a career beyond Staten Island. The fragile illusion shatters when Rose's young niece discovers a hidden stash of guns and drugs in the bakery's office, revealing the business is a front and their cousin, Allie, is involved. Connie, furious, orders Rose to stay silent. Seeking an escape, Connie drives Rose to Manhattan for an open audition to be a TV guest host. While waiting, Rose sees a live news report: her father and his associates have been arrested by the FBI for murder and racketeering, with an informant—revealed to be Allie—naming Joe as responsible for Uncle Nick's death.

The family is thrown into crisis. Connie and Rose go to the bakery to remove the guns, money and drugs that Lilly found while playing hide and seek in the bakery. Paranoid and armed, Allie accidentally shoots Connie, fatally wounding her, thinking that she and Rose were goons coming to kill him. Allie confesses to being the informant at the bakery, fearing for his life. Allie tells Rose to tell his mother that he is sorry before killing himself in front of Rose leaving her utterly traumatized as she cradles her dying sister.

Two years later, Joe is released from prison after serving a short sentence. Rose has become the primary caretaker for Connie's daughter, Lily. The family prepares for a strained homecoming. When Joe returns, attempting to resume his role with familiar gestures, Rose finally confronts him. She unleashes years of suppressed fear and anger, blaming him for Connie's death and the destruction of their family's chance at a normal life. She reveals she was the child in the garage who overheard his criminal dealings, and that he knew she was there. Her pivotal question, "Who protects us from you?" hangs in the air. Rose takes the money that she took from the bakery which she had hidden all these years and packs her bags. The film ends with Rose walking out of the house with Lily, symbolizing her definitive break from the cycle of violence and silence, as she chooses to find her own voice and path forward.

== Cast ==
- Jennifer Esposito as Francine
- Emily Bader as Rose
- Odessa A'zion as Connie
- Domenick Lombardozzi as Joe
- Annabella Sciorra as Christine
- Nicholas Cirillo as Alli
- Stelio Savante as Nello
- Franco Maicas as Frankie
- Callie Thorne as Linda
- Camryn Adele Portagallo as Tara

== Production ==
Jennifer Esposito told Variety that the idea for the script had been “percolating” in her mind since she was 16 years-old and growing up on Staten Island.

Esposito told Deadline Hollywood in October 2021, she had struggled to get financing for the project from financiers and distributors due to the lack of male lead actors in the film. Funding instead arrived from a unique source, with Deadline Hollywood calling it “the first feature film financed and traded by a global group of fan investors via this first-of-its-kind IPO on Upstream Exchange, the Ethereum-powered digital stock exchange”.

In November 2021, Annabella Sciorra joined Esposito in the cast playing Christine, the sister of Esposito's character Francine. Odessa A'zion and Emily Bader joined the cast in December 2021 as Francine's daughters.

Principal photography took place on Staten Island in February 2022.

== Release ==
The film premiered at the Tribeca Film Festival on June 16, 2023. Later that year it was shown at the Red Sea International Film Festival.

Fresh Kills was released in the United States on June 14, 2024.

== Reception ==
On the review aggregator website Rotten Tomatoes, 92% of 25 critics' reviews are positive, with an average rating of 7.4/10.
