= Time of the Monkey =

- Poker Face episode
- Episode no.: Season 1 Episode 5
- Directed by: Lucky McKee
- Written by: Wyatt Cain; Charlie Peppers
- Cinematography by: Christine Ng
- Editing by: Shaheed Qaasim
- Original release date: February 2, 2023
- Running time: 50 minutes

Guest appearances
- Judith Light as Irene Smothers; S. Epatha Merkerson as Joyce Carter; K Callan as Betty; Reed Birney as Ben Holmes; Simon Helberg as Luca Clark; Darius Fraser as Billy

Episode chronology
| ← Previous "Rest in Metal" | Next → "Exit Stage Death" |

"Time of the Monkey" is the fifth episode of the American murder mystery comedy-drama television series Poker Face. The episode was written by executive story editor Wyatt Cain and story editor Charlie Peppers and directed by Lucky McKee. It was released on Peacock on February 2, 2023.

The series follows Charlie Cale, a woman with the ability to detect if people are lying; after exposing a murder plot at a casino, she is now on the run from the owner's enforcer Cliff LeGrand. In the episode, Charlie works as a janitor at a retirement home. She becomes friends with two elderly ladies, Irene and Joyce, and must investigate when a new resident suddenly dies.

The episode received positive reviews from critics, who praised Lyonne's performance, the guest stars, tension and humor, although some questioned certain story decisions, with one review complaining about the suspension of disbelief in the episode. For the episode, Judith Light won Outstanding Guest Actress in a Comedy Series at the 75th Primetime Creative Arts Emmy Awards.

== Plot ==
At the Mossy Oaks retirement home in Millbrook, Ohio, friends Irene (Judith Light) and Joyce (S. Epatha Merkerson) live together in the same apartment. Irene uses a wheelchair. One day, they notice a man, Ben (Reed Birney), checking into the retirement home. Having known him, they conclude they must kill him. Irene locks herself in the restroom and climbs into Ben's room using the rose trellis, where she kills him with an injection of sodium nitrate and switches his medical wearable with hers before leaving the room. They then leave for the local zoo, where Joyce tasers Irene, causing the heart monitor on the wearable to flatline and alerting the staff, who pronounce Ben dead. When Irene and Joyce return to the retirement home, they switch the wearables again, providing them with an alibi.

A few days prior, Charlie (Natasha Lyonne) is revealed to be working at Mossy Oaks. Despite being warned to stay away from Irene and Joyce, she hangs out with them, with the three bonding over the ideology to stand up for one's beliefs. Irene and Joyce reveal that in their youth, they were hippies and part of a polyamorous cult, with both women having relationships with the leader, Gabriel. However, Gabriel abandoned them when police raided the cult, with a gunshot costing Irene the use of her legs. Later, Charlie unknowingly meets Ben, who was brought in by his nephew Luca (Simon Helberg). That night, Ben meets with Irene and Joyce, who are aware that he is Gabriel. Ben seeks forgiveness, revealing that he helped the police in the raid in exchange for protection. After he leaves, they conclude that they must kill him for his betrayal.

The next day, Ben dies while Charlie accompanies Joyce and Irene to the zoo. At his funeral, Charlie meets with Luca, who reveals that he is actually an FBI agent who was guarding Ben in the witness protection program. When Charlie reveals that Irene and Joyce are also at Mossy Oaks, Luca has an FBI team question them. He informs Charlie that the cult had planned to bomb a high school Model UN competition. Irene and Joyce are released due to lack of evidence, but they grow suspicious of Charlie revealing their identities.

With the help of a trio of murder-mystery-loving women known as "the Fletchers", Charlie learns that sodium nitrate could kill a person without leaving any trace in the autopsy, with Joyce having access to it. Charlie also discovers that Ben's wearable revealed that his heartbeat suddenly increased for his last hours. With the help of Pervy Pete and resident Betty (K Callan), she learns about erotic tasing and finds that Joyce tasered Irene, which could simulate a heart attack. However, Betty also informed Irene what she saw and is subsequently killed in a bomb hidden in her Instant Pot.

Charlie shows up in Irene and Joyce's apartment. She states that nurses tried to revive Ben with a defibrilator, yet the shocks were not registered in his wearable. Before she can inform the FBI, Irene and Joyce attack her, escalating into a brutal fight. When Joyce prepares to inject her with sodium nitrate, Charlie takes the taser and shocks herself. She is revealed to be wearing a wearable, which causes the FBI to storm the room and arrest Irene and Joyce. Luca offers Charlie a job at the FBI but she declines, realizing that the bureau has not received her evidence against Kazimir Caine. As she turns on her cart, she discovers it is rigged and jumps out before it explodes, while Irene and Joyce look on from the back of a squad car.

== Production ==
=== Development ===
The series was announced in March 2021, with Rian Johnson serving as creator, writer, director and executive producer. Johnson stated that the series would delve into "the type of fun, character driven, case-of-the-week mystery goodness I grew up watching." The episode was directed by Lucky McKee, a close friend of Johnson (Johnson co-edited McKee's 2002 feature directorial debut May), while executive story editor Wyatt Cain and story editor Charlie Peppers wrote it. This was McKee's first directing credit, Cain's second writing credit and Peppers' first writing credit for the show.

=== Casting ===
The announcement of the series included that Natasha Lyonne would serve as the main lead actress. She was approached by Johnson about working on a procedural project together, with Lyonne as the lead character. As Johnson explained, the role was "completely cut to measure for her."

Due to the series' procedural aspects, the episodes feature several guest stars. Johnson was inspired by the number of actors who guest starred on Columbo, wanting to deem each guest star as the star of the episode, which allowed them to attract many actors. The episode featured appearances by Simon Helberg, Judith Light, S. Epatha Merkerson and Reed Birney, who were announced to guest star in June and September 2022.

Light agreed to work on the project, on the condition that she could work with Merkerson, who was in talks to join the series. When Merkerson was thanked for her appearance, she was quoted as saying "someone finally let me say ‘motherfucker’ on TV!"

=== Writing ===
Rian Johnson explained that the writers intended for Charlie to be friends with Irene and Joyce. He explained, "That's always the slight tempting thing [making this the one case where Charlie walked away from the murder of the week without turning the culprits in], because the instant you start doing that subversion of, in this one, it's the killers that she becomes friends with — especially when they're as charismatic as Judith and S. Epatha, it leads to that question. And my position was always, that's not off the table — but that needs to be a really special case, that needs to be a last resort. Honestly, it was a lot more interesting, to me, the way that Natasha plays the scene where she realizes the truth about the ladies. And the notion of thinking that you've found someone to look up to, and then they severely let you down and being disillusioned with them seemed like a much more interesting thing and the place to go."

Regarding the nature of Irene and Joyce, Light said "This isn't about a couple of old ladies in a [nursing home], they're hiding out in this place. Where else are we gonna go? So it's the perfect setup for them to keep hiding and then they find out who this person is and it's like... now we have to kill you." She also added, "You have female detectives, but you don't get to see that kind of mature woman doing all that physical stuff and having a real mouth on them."

=== Filming ===
Light performed most of her stunts in the episode, with the help of the series' medical consultant Gary Baisley. Director Lucky McKee was worried about the nature of the episode, but the stunt coordinators helped in easing concerns. He said about the climatic fight, "We had done 70 setups or something that day, working with two cameras. It went off without a hitch." Johnson nicknamed it "the They Live fight".

== Critical reception ==
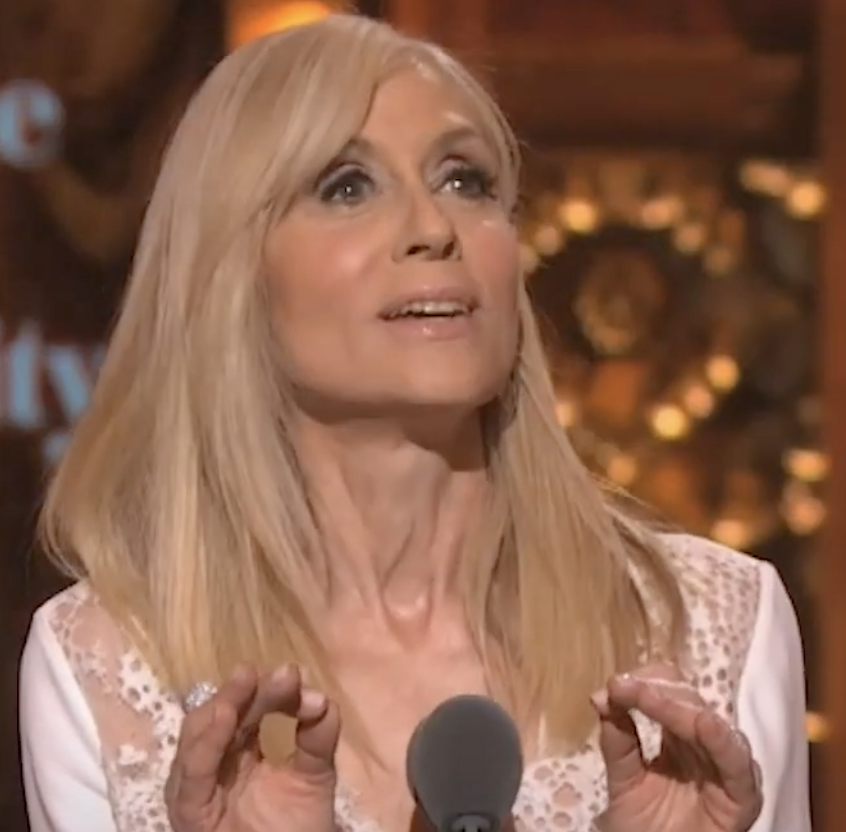
For the episode, Judith Light won Outstanding Guest Actress in a Comedy Series at the 75th Primetime Creative Arts Emmy Awards.

"Time of the Monkey" received positive reviews from critics. Saloni Gajjar of The A.V. Club gave the episode a "B–" grade and wrote, "A big gripe with episode five's central case is that it aims to get away with some incredulous logic, which takes me out of PF's wisely curated pastiche. (And feels surprising considering Johnson's knack for the genre). All the previous cases, from Natalie's murder in the pilot to Taffy plotting his brother's death in episode three, are well-executed. It's what the whole show hinges on. But not in 'Time Of The Monkey.'"

Alan Sepinwall of Rolling Stone wrote, "It's a much messier episode than the previous ones, but the spectacle of Lyonne mixing it up with Merkerson, Light, and/or their stuntwomen was more than enough payoff for an episode that featured the show's most entertaining villains to date." Amanda Whiting of Vulture gave the episode a 4 star rating out of 5 and wrote, "Watching the first four installments back to back to back to back, the simple, rhythmic pleasures of the howcatchem formula started to spoil. 'That's a red herring, Charlie!' I wanted to scream at our heroine, whose unhurried gumshoe-ing wasn't improving as quickly as my Monday morning quarterbacking. But 'Time of the Monkey' isn't just the only episode of Poker Face I watched this week, it's the only episode of TV I've watched, full stop. (It's been an admittedly weird week for me, a person who makes a living writing about the TV she's watched.) But absence made my heart grow fonder for this series, including its reliable reversals and roundabouts."

Meghan O'Keefe of Decider wrote, "Poker Face Episode 5 is the best of what the murder mystery genre is: an exploration of what we consider good and evil to actually be." Sarah Fields of Telltale TV gave the episode a 4 star rating out of 5 and wrote, "There are no red herrings to mislead us. It relies on simple framing devices to play with perspective and lets viewers' own inclinations do the rest. It all makes for another fun and particularly exciting hour of TV."

=== Accolades ===
TVLine named Judith Light and S. Epatha Merkerson as honorable mentions as the "Performer of the Week" for the week of February 4, 2023, for their performance in the episode. The site wrote, "Poker Face's scheming seniors Joyce and Irene might be in a retirement home, but they can still pack a punch. Esteemed TV veterans Judith Light and S. Epatha Merkerson — who have a trophy room full of acting awards between them — made a killer duo this week as Joyce and Irene, a pair of rebellious former hippies who quickly befriend Charlie by sharing their weed stash. Light and Merkerson had a vigorous, defiant energy together as the longtime pals gleefully made mischief, and they chilled our blood, too, when we learned they were very capable of murdering anyone who stood in the way of their revolution. They even mixed it up with Charlie in a hilariously brutal fistfight after Charlie discovered their crimes. Poker Face is a terrific showcase for one-off guest stars, and Light and Merkerson proved they still have more than a few tricks left up their sleeves."

Light received a nomination for Outstanding Guest Actress in a Comedy Series at the 75th Primetime Creative Arts Emmy Awards. She won the award, marking the first win for the series and her first Primetime Emmy Award win.
