= Dead Man's Hand (Poker Face) =

- Poker Face episode
- Episode no.: Season 1 Episode 1
- Directed by: Rian Johnson
- Written by: Rian Johnson
- Cinematography by: Steve Yedlin
- Editing by: Bob Ducsay
- Original release date: January 26, 2023
- Running time: 67 minutes

Guest appearances
- Adrien Brody as Sterling Frost Jr.; Dascha Polanco as Natalie; Benjamin Bratt as Cliff LeGrand; Noah Segan as Sheriff Parker; Ron Perlman as Sterling Frost Sr. (voice only)

Episode chronology
← Previous —	Next → "The Night Shift"

"Dead Man's Hand" is the series premiere of the American murder mystery comedy-drama television series Poker Face. The episode was written and directed by series creator Rian Johnson. It was released on Peacock on January 26, 2023, alongside the three follow-up episodes.

The series follows Charlie Cale, a woman with the ability to detect if people are lying. After using her ability to win poker tournaments, she is caught by a powerful casino owner in Laughlin. Rather than banning her from his casino, he gives her a job as a waitress. The episode follows Charlie as she finds that her friend Natalie has been killed, deducing that her death was staged to cover a bigger crime.

The series premiere received positive reviews from critics, who praised Johnson's directing, writing, editing, cinematography, Lyonne's performances and pacing as strong points.

== Plot ==
In Laughlin, Nevada, while cleaning a hotel room at the Frost Casino, housekeeper Natalie Hill (Dascha Polanco) discovers disturbing content on the laptop computer of Kazimir Caine, a very wealthy patron of the casino. She takes a picture with her phone and shows it to the head of security, Cliff LeGrand (Benjamin Bratt), and the casino's manager, Sterling Frost Jr. (Adrien Brody). Sterling claims he will take care of the matter but discreetly deletes the photos from Natalie's phone and tells her to go home. Acting on Sterling's orders, Cliff murders Natalie and her husband, staging the crime scene to look like a murder–suicide.

Earlier that day, Natalie had carpooled with her friend Charlie Cale (Natasha Lyonne), who works at the casino as a cocktail waitress. Shortly after their arrival, Natalie's abusive husband Jerry burst into the casino, drunkenly demanding to see her. Charlie distracted Jerry until Cliff and security guards were able to take his gun and throw him out of the building.

Charlie has the innate ability to detect lies, which Sterling wants to utilize to fleece Caine during the illegal poker games he holds in his hotel room. Appealing to her sense of loyalty and the fear of his father Sterling Frost Sr. (who had spared her life when he caught her using her lie-detecting skills playing poker at the casino several years earlier), Sterling persuades Charlie to join his plan.

The next day, Charlie learns of Natalie's murder, with the police concluding that Jerry killed her before killing himself. She suspects something else must have happened, since Natalie called her before her shift was over and left the casino in a hurry. At the police station, Charlie is denied access to the evidence locker but sees a picture of the crime scene depicting Jerry with his gun in his right hand; this piques Charlie's interest, as she knew that Jerry was left-handed. Sterling is informed of her visit and angrily orders Charlie to stop investigating any further.

Ignoring his warning, Charlie sneaks into Natalie's home. She retrieves Natalie's tablet computer and is eventually able to unlock it. She finds the deleted photos from Natalie's phone, including the criminal content on Caine's laptop. Charlie takes this evidence to Sterling, who claims they will report Caine to the FBI after their operation that night. While at a bar, she sees a news report of the "murder–suicide" that includes video footage of Jerry's outburst and expulsion from the casino.

Charlie confronts Sterling, telling him she knows he ordered Cliff to kill Natalie. She shows him the footage of Jerry's expulsion: as he passed through the metal detector, the indicator light was green, proving he did not have his gun because Cliff kept it. Sterling rebuffs the claims and threatens to throw her off the balcony and stage it as a suicide. However, Charlie reveals she alerted Caine of Sterling's plan to fleece him, effectively destroying the casino's reputation as none of the high-profile gamblers will be able to trust him. Unable to face the consequences of his actions and the disappointment of his father, Sterling jumps off the balcony to his death.

Cliff chases Charlie through the halls and shoots her in the side. She manages to leave the casino through a window and escapes Laughlin. At a bar, she sends the photos that Natalie took from Caine's laptop to the authorities. Sterling Sr. (Ron Perlman) gives Charlie a phone call, blaming her for Sterling Jr.'s suicide and vowing to track her down and kill her. Charlie destroys her phone and drives away in her blue Plymouth Barracuda.

== Production ==
=== Development ===
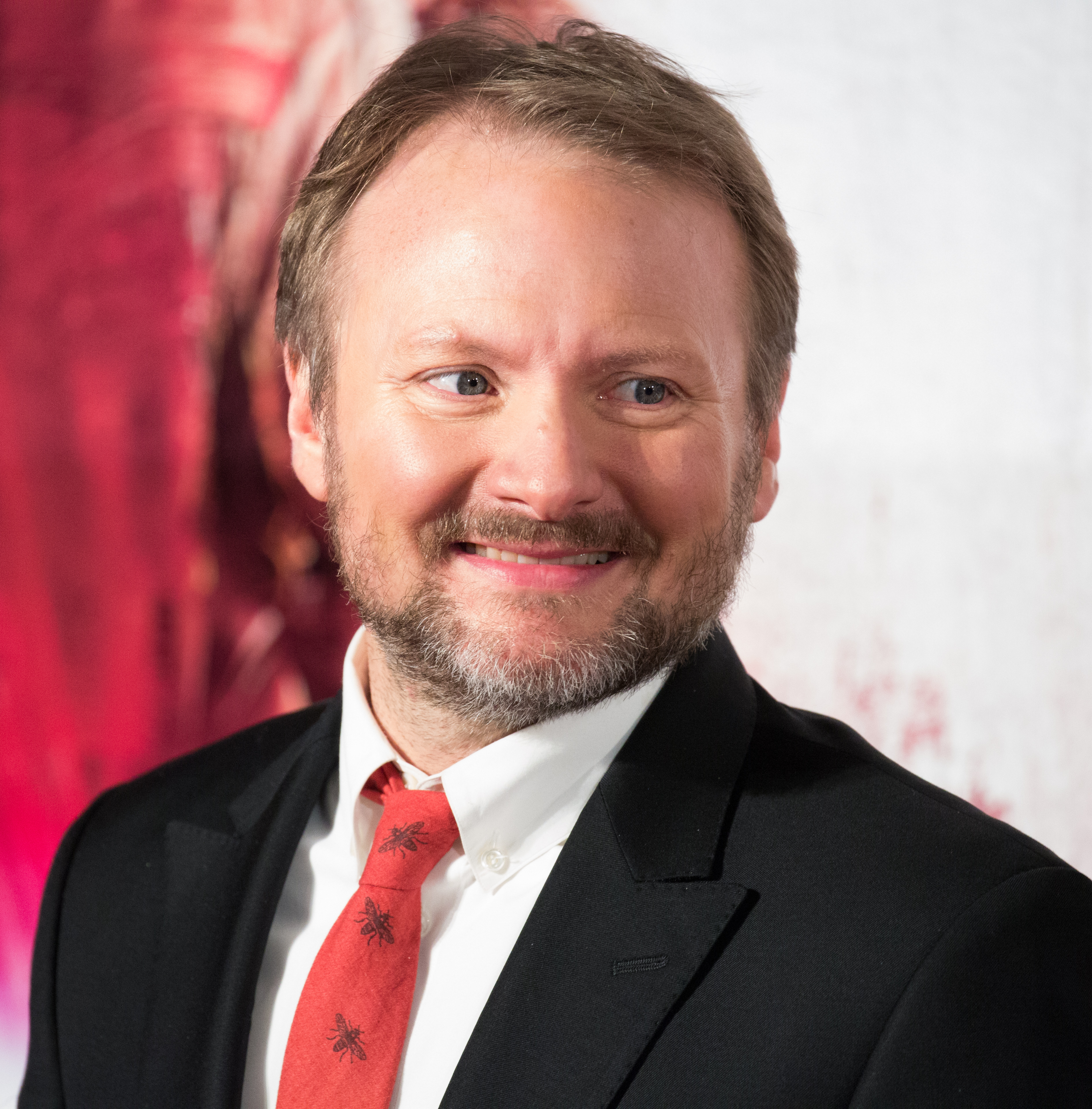
Series creator Rian Johnson wrote and directed the episode.

The project was announced in March 2021, with Rian Johnson serving as creator, writer, director and executive producer. Johnson stated that the series would delve into "the type of fun, character driven, case-of-the-week mystery goodness I grew up watching." The series was inspired by Columbo, being referred to as a "howcatchem". Johnson also used Magnum, P.I., The Rockford Files, Quantum Leap, Highway to Heaven and The Incredible Hulk as influences for the tone of the series. Johnson was interested in "doing that Columbo or even Quantum Leap thing of having every episode be an anthropological deep dive into a little corner of America that you might not otherwise see." The episode was directed by Johnson, who also wrote it. According to Johnson, the episode was written in 2020, before he started writing Glass Onion: A Knives Out Mystery.

=== Casting ===
The announcement of the series included that Natasha Lyonne would serve as the main lead actress. She was approached by Johnson about working on a procedural project together, with Lyonne as the lead character. As Johnson explained, the role was "completely cut to measure for her." While the series and lead character would share things in common with Columbo, the writers sought to differentiate the lead character by making her a con artist, instead of working with the law.

Due to the series' procedural aspects, the episodes feature several guest stars. Johnson was inspired by the amount of actors who guest starred on Columbo, wanting to treat each guest star as the star of the episode, which allowed them to attract many actors. The episode featured appearances by Adrien Brody and Dascha Polanco, who were announced to guest star in April and June 2022, respectively. The episode features an appearance by Noah Segan, a frequent collaborator of Johnson. Ron Perlman also guest stars in the series as Sterling Frost Sr., with his role credited as a voice cameo in the final scenes of the episode. The episode also includes an uncredited appearance by Ted Griffin, who previously worked with Johnson in Terriers.

In April 2022, Benjamin Bratt joined the series. Instead of a guest role, his character would recur as Cliff, the head of security at a casino where Charlie works. When she escapes the casino, his character would go after her, deeming it "a ticking clock for the show".

=== Filming ===
Despite being written as the series premiere, it was actually the second episode to be filmed. The exterior shots were filmed in Laughlin, Nevada, six months after filming on the episode had wrapped, with the Riverside Resort Hotel & Casino depicting the fictional Frost Casino.

== Critical reception ==
"Dead Man's Hand" received extremely positive reviews from critics. Saloni Gajjar of The A.V. Club gave the episode an "A-" grade and wrote, "Poker Face is clearly Charlie's story, but each episode presents enticing and serious subplots even if we don't spend sufficient time with them. The premiere's case deals with a child pornography ring that Frost Casino may or may not benefit from. Since Charlie is our lens into it all, and she's embarked on a road trip far away from Vegas, it's all we'll ever know (for now, at least). But that's alright because, as established, Charlie's journey is compellingly told."

Alan Sepinwall of Rolling Stone wrote, "Goddamn, what a relief and delight it is to see a TV show that actually wants to be a TV show, and that knows how to do that at this high a level." Amanda Whiting of Vulture gave the episode a 4 star rating out of 5 and wrote, "All in all, the episode is a fun little low-stakes romp — low-stakes because Sterling is such a smarmy buffoon that he can’t muster anything approaching actual menace."

Daniel D'Addario of Variety praised Lyonne's character, writing, "the character is a profound underachiever, capable of detecting any lie (and, as such, dominating at the card table) but content to take whatever job comes her way." Lauren Milici of Total Film gave the episode a 4.5 star rating out of 5 and wrote, "Poker Face is a modern throwback of a genre we haven't seen since the '90s. Sure, Knives Out's Benoit Blanc is an icon in his own right, but Charlie Cale is the relatable hero we've all been waiting for. Each episode pits her against a brand new guest star, and God only knows what other horrors she'll encounter while on the run. We're off to a great start for what's sure to be one hell of a ride."

IndieWire named "Dead Man's Hand" the twelfth best TV episode of 2023.
