= Ain't It Funny (disambiguation) =

"Ain't It Funny" is a 2001 single by Jennifer Lopez.

Ain't It Funny may also refer to:

- "Ain't It Funny (Murder Remix)", a 2002 song by Jennifer Lopez
- Ain't It Funny, a 1972 album by Anthony Newley
- "Ain't It Funny", a 2003 song by Soledad Brothers from Voice of Treason
- "Ain't It Funny", a 1998 song by Enuff Z'Nuff from Paraphernalia
- "Ain't It Funny", a 2012 song by George Jackson from The Jeb Loy Nichols Special
- "Ain't It Funny", a 1975 song by Peter Goalby
- "Ain't It Funny", a 1996 song by Ken Munshaw from Human Condition
- "Ain't It Funny", a 1994 song by Branford Marsalis from Buckshot LeFonque
- "Ain't It Funny", a 1999 song by Brainstorm
- "Ain't It Funny", a 1962 song by Gerri Granger
- "Ain't It Funny", a 1978 song by Colin Blunstone
- "Ain't It Funny", a 2016 song by Danny Brown from Atrocity Exhibition

== See also ==
- "Ain't It Funny What a Difference Just a Few Hours Make", a Broadway song
