= Akpobome =

Akpobome is a name from Urhobo people from Delta state, Nigeria.

== Notable individuals with the name ==
- Alex Akpobome is an American actor
- Alibaba Akpobome (born 24 June 1965) is a Nigerian stand-up comedian, master of ceremonies and actor.
