= Christina Elmore =

American actress

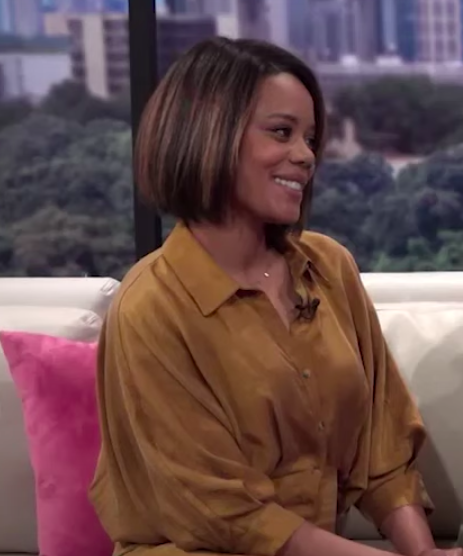
- Christina Elmore in 2020
- Born: Christina Lorenn Elmore; March 18, 1987 (age 38); Los Angeles, California, U.S.
- Education: Harvard University; American Conservatory Theater
- Occupation: Actress
- Years active: 2013–present
- Children: 2

Christina Lorenn Elmore (born March 18, 1987) is an American actress, known for her role in the TV series The Last Ship as Lieutenant Alisha Granderson, and her roles on Twenties and HBO's Insecure.

== Early life and education ==
Elmore was born to Dr. Ronn Elmore and Aladrian Slade Elmore, and raised in Los Angeles and Sacramento, California. She graduated from Franklin High School and then attended Harvard University, where she received a Bachelor of Arts degree in African American studies. She began acting in theater productions as an undergraduate. In 2012, she received her Master of Fine Arts degree in acting from American Conservatory Theater.

== Career ==
In 2014, Elmore played a lead role in Adam Rapp's The Purple Lights of Joppa Illinois, staged by South Coast Repertory.

Elmore's first film job was a small role in the critically acclaimed film Fruitvale Station. Her first series regular role was in the action-drama series The Last Ship, where she portrayed Lt. Alisha Granderson for five seasons. Elmore guest-starred in two episodes of HBO's Insecure and returned for a recurring role on season four.

Elmore was cast in a lead role on Twenties, which premiered on BET in 2020.

== Personal life ==
Elmore is married to Ryan Duke. As of September 2020, she was pregnant with their second child.

== Filmography ==
=== Film ===
Year	Title	Role	Notes
2013	Fruitvale Station	Ashae	
TBA	What If He Wins	Jades	

=== Television ===
Year	Title	Role	Notes
2014–2018	The Last Ship	Lt. Alisha Granderson	53 episodes
2016	Vehicle for Revenge	Det. Jackson	Television film
2018–2021	Insecure	Condola Hayes	12 episodes
2019	Roxie Wolfgang	Gemma Banks	1 episode
2020	Twenties	Marie	18 episodes
TBA	Under the Bridge	Brianna Reims	Television film
2024	The Girls on the Bus	Kimberlyn	Main role
