= Pumping Black =

Upcoming American thriller film

- Directed by: Mimi Cave
- Written by: Haley Hope Bartels
- Produced by: Stacey Sher; Natalie Portman; Sophie Mas; Mimi Cave; Sébastien Raybaud
- Starring: Jonathan Bailey; Natalie Portman; Lukas Gage; Alex Akpobome; Daniel Quinn-Toye; Lucas Lynggaard Tønnesen; Arieh Worthalter; Tony Hale
- Cinematography: Justin Brown
- Edited by: Martin Pensa
- Production companies: Anton Studios; MountainA; Shiny Penny
- Distributed by: Amazon MGM Studios
- Country: United States
- Language: English

Pumping Black is an upcoming American psychological thriller film set in the world of professional cycling. It is directed by Mimi Cave and stars Jonathan Bailey and Natalie Portman.

== Cast ==
- Jonathan Bailey as Taylor Mace
- Natalie Portman
- Lukas Gage
- Alex Akpobome
- Daniel Quinn-Toye
- Lucas Lynggaard Tønnesen
- Arieh Worthalter
- Tony Hale

== Production ==
The film is directed by Mimi Cave from a screenplay by Haley Hope Bartels. The script won one of the Academy of Motion Picture Arts and Sciences' five Nicholl Fellowships in Screenwriting in 2021. Producers on the film include Stacey Sher for Shiny Penny, Natalie Portman and Sophie Mas for MountainA and Cave and Sébastien Raybaud for Anton Studios. Amazon MGM Studios bought international rights to the film in May 2026.

The cast is led by Portman and Jonathan Bailey, with both attached by May 2026. The cast also includes Lukas Gage and Alex Akpobome, who both joined in August 2026, as well as Daniel Quinn-Toye, Lucas Lynggaard Tønnesen, Arieh Worthalter and Tony Hale.

Principal photography began in October 2026 in the French Alps, with filming scheduled to last until December 2026.
