= Hometown Hero (Poker Face) =

- Poker Face episode
- Episode no.: Season 2 Episode 5
- Directed by: John Dahl
- Written by: Tony Tost
- Cinematography by: Christine Ng
- Editing by: Melissa Kent
- Original air date: May 22, 2025
- Running time: 45 minutes

Guest appearances
- Simon Rex as Russ "Rocket" Waddell; Brandon Perea as Felix Domingo; Steve Buscemi as Good Buddy (voice only); Gil Birmingham as Skip Dooley; Carol Kane as Lucille; Ego Nwodim as Gilda Deacon; B. J. Novak as Hiram Lubinski; Noah Segan as Lew Dundee; Ruffin Prentiss as Goose

Episode chronology
| ← Previous "The Taste of Human Blood" | Next → "Sloppy Joseph" |

"Hometown Hero" is the fifth episode of the second season of the American murder mystery comedy-drama television series Poker Face. It is the fifteenth overall episode of the series and was written by showrunner Tony Tost, and directed by John Dahl. It was released on Peacock on May 22, 2025.

The series follows Charlie Cale, a woman with the ability to detect if people are lying, who is now embarking on a fresh start after criminal boss Beatrix Hasp cancels a hit on her. In the episode, Charlie gets a new job as a "ball girl" for a Minor League Baseball team and investigates a teammate's "accidental" death.

The episode received mixed reviews from critics. While Simon Rex earned high praise for his guest appearance, many critics were disappointed with the resolution to the episode's story, as well as its under-used guest stars.

== Plot ==
"Rocket" Russ Waddell (Simon Rex) is a pitcher for the Montgomery Cheesemongers, a Minor League Baseball team, but his age is catching up to him. After a poor performance, manager Skip Dooley (Gil Birmingham) tells Russ that he will be forced into retirement after his next starting game. Russ finds from his teammates that their own fans are gambling based on how many games they can lose. He convinces four of them to bet against their team and throw the next five games.

The conspiring players succeed in fixing the first four games. On the day of the fifth, Skip tells Russ that he is choosing to prioritize rookie pitcher Felix Domingo (Brandon Perea). To sabotage Felix's game, one of the teammates, Goose (Ruffin Prentiss), spikes his bubble gum with LSD, but inadvertently causes Felix to give an excellent performance. On the ninth inning, the catcher warns the opposing team's batter about a play, allowing the visitors to score and win. This makes the Cheesemongers the biggest losers in Minor League history and wins Russ and his friends $3,136,018. Russ sneaks into the locker room to discard the laced gum, only to be confronted by Felix. He mocks Russ and blackmails him for the entire $3 million. Angered, Russ hits Felix in the back of the head with a baseball at 101 miles per hour, killing him. He retrieves Felix's evidence and stages the scene to make it look like an accident with the pitching machine.

A few days prior, Charlie (Natasha Lyonne) is working as an administrative assistant in an office building near Velvety Canned Cheese Park. After being hit by a baseball, she returns the ball to ballpark owner Lucille (Carol Kane), who gives her a job as a ball girl. Charlie enjoys her job talking with regulars and flirts with Russ, who was a promising star until he lost his fastball. After the fifth loss, Charlie meets Felix, who expresses his LSD-induced desire to quit baseball. She eats some of his gum. After she leaves, Felix finds evidence linking the team's performance to their gambling. Now high herself, Charlie hallucinates talking with Velvety Cheese founder Hiram Lubinski (B. J. Novak). He tasks her with saving the ballpark and the team, leaving her confused.

The following day, a hungover Charlie is informed of Felix's death. As the antiquated pitching machine is deemed responsible, the park is at risk of closing due to a wrongful death lawsuit. Charlie points out that Felix was high, but the reagent test comes back negative. From questioning Carl, Charlie realizes that the team spiked Felix's gum for gambling purposes. She checks the coroner's report and notes that Felix was hit by a baseball going at least 100 mph, a figure that the machine is unable to reach. While testing it, she talks with Russ over his fastball, noting that he is lying about not having it anymore.

Russ prepares for his final game, which could also be the ballpark's final game. Charlie confronts him in private, having deduced that Russ got his fastball between Felix's debut and his death. Russ does not deny the accusation and states that the team plans to rig their upcoming game for a similar payout. Before he leaves, Charlie tells Russ that a major league scout is in attendance; Russ spots a man using a radar gun in the crowd. He abandons his plan and pitches a fastball at 101 mph. However, the man is revealed to be a police officer who assigns his officers to block the ballpark's exits. Knowing his arrest is imminent, Russ tips his hat to Charlie and continues playing his final game as the crowd cheers.

== Production ==
=== Development ===
The series was announced in March 2021, with Rian Johnson serving as creator, writer, director and executive producer. Johnson stated that the series would delve into "the type of fun, character driven, case-of-the-week mystery goodness I grew up watching." The episode was written by showrunner Tony Tost, and directed by John Dahl. This was Tost's first writing credit, and Dahl's first directing credit for the show.

=== Casting ===
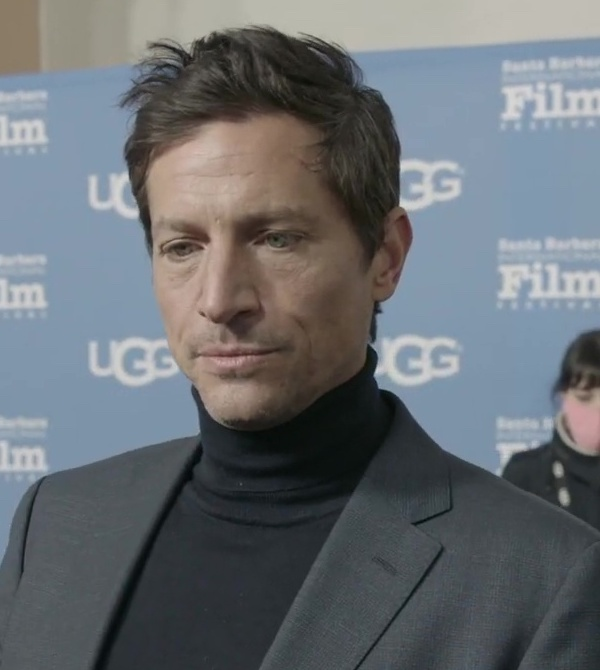
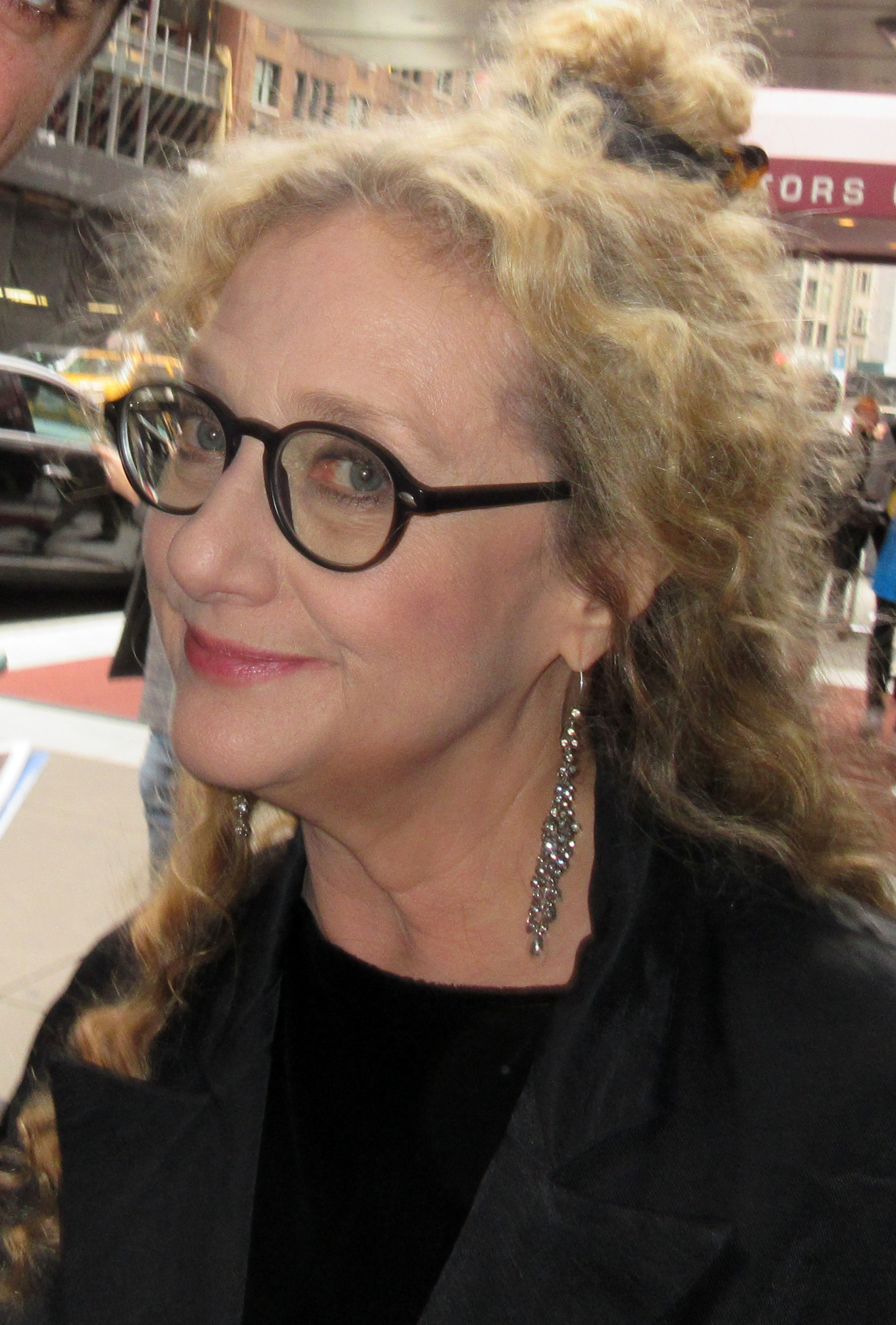
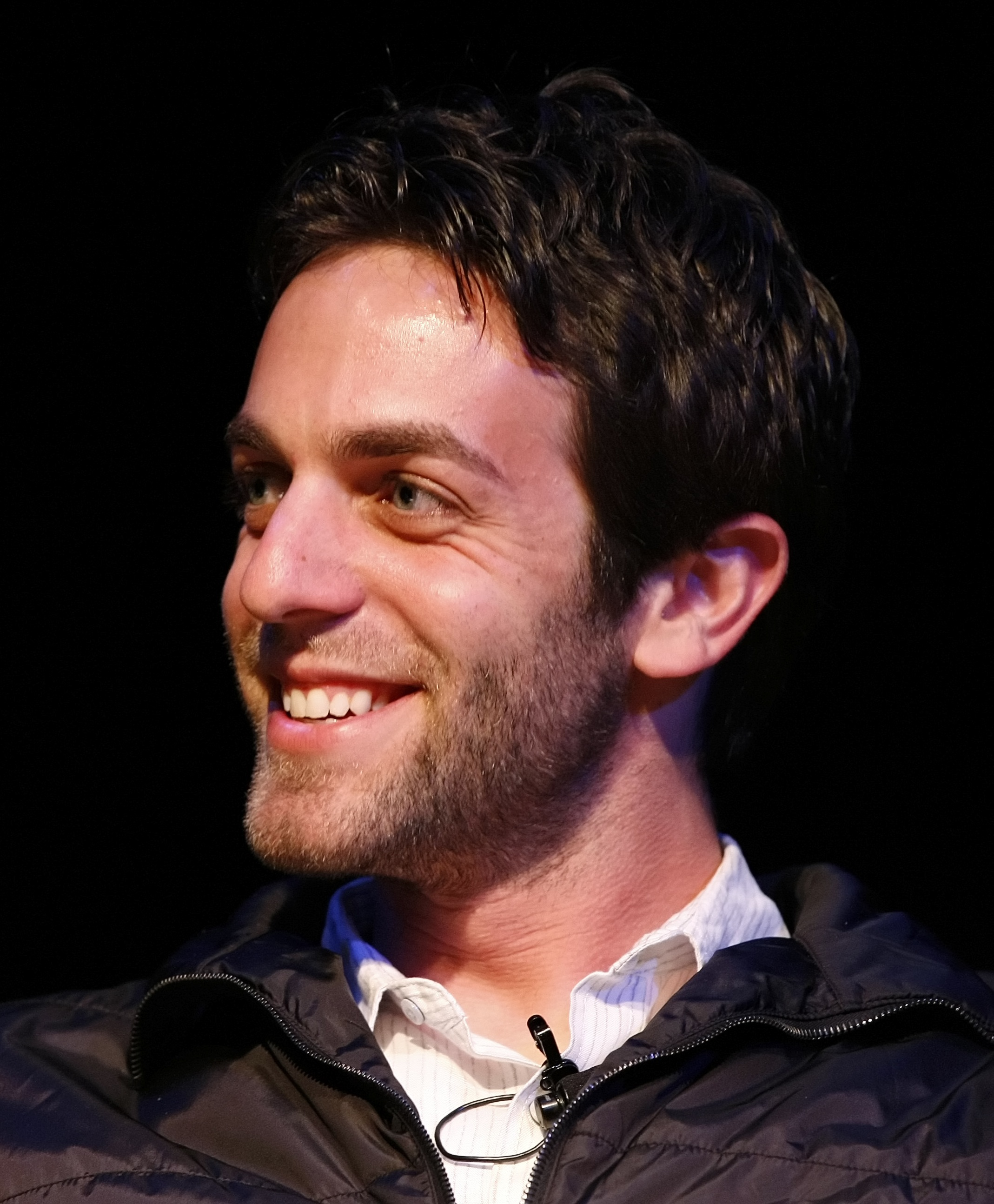
Simon Rex, Carol Kane and B. J. Novak guest star in the episode.

The announcement of the series included that Natasha Lyonne would serve as the main lead actress. She was approached by Johnson about working on a procedural project together, with Lyonne as the lead character. As Johnson explained, the role was "completely cut to measure for her."

Due to the series' procedural aspects, the episodes feature several guest stars. Johnson was inspired by the amount of actors who guest starred on Columbo, wanting to deem each guest star as the star of the episode, which allowed them to attract many actors. The episode featured guest appearances by B. J. Novak, Ego Nwodim, Simon Rex and Carol Kane, who were announced to guest star in September, October and November 2024, and February 2025, respectively.

The episode also includes a voice cameo from Steve Buscemi, with Tony Tost explaining that he would be prominent through the season, "In Season 2, he's a voice of comfort and reason for her." Tost added, "We liked how it was retro, like a show from the 1980s like Hardcastle and McCormick or Magnum, P.I. or The A-Team would have some confidant who was a recognizable actor's voice on the radio."

== Critical reception ==
"Hometown Hero" received mixed reviews from critics. Noel Murray of The A.V. Club gave the episode an "A–" grade and wrote, "This is an advantage that post-fugitive Poker Face has over the old version of the show. There needn't be a lot of wind-down and transition at the end of the hour. Instead, just like the series' spiritual forebear Columbo, an episode can just... end. In most Columbos, once the lieutenant solved the mystery by revealing the key piece of evidence, the episode cut to the credits in about a minute. Granted, it does take some confidence and skill even to attempt such a move. But this Poker Face episode? It has zip."

Alan Sepinwall wrote, "this is one of those episodes that feels like it needs more of Charlie interacting with the killer, and/or one more twist to the story. Nothing bad, but it didn't quite click. That said, I appreciate that, now that Charlie can actually call in the cops for help because she's not a fugitive, the show is being clever about how she calls them in. Having a cop pose as a major league scout to bait Russ into throwing his fastball is a smart piece of business, and true to the Columbo tradition of the killer's ego ultimately dooming them."

Louis Peitzman of Vulture gave the episode a 4 star rating out of 5 and wrote, "I am not a baseball person. I get it, in theory. With that in mind, I approached this baseball-centric episode of Poker Face with some trepidation. I didn't consent to having sports injected into my weekly howcatchem mystery! Thankfully, you don't really have to care about baseball to appreciate “Hometown Hero,” which is less about the game itself and more about baseball as metaphor for the passage of time." Elisa Guimarães of Collider wrote, "It's a very underwhelming ending to a very underwhelming story. More than that, it is an ending that makes us question whether Poker Face has forgotten about one of its core elements: the idea that hitting a bad guy where it hurts might be more important than bringing the cops into the game."

Ben Sherlock of Screen Rant wrote, "Most Poker Face episodes continually escalate their mysteries with new twists to keep us engaged, even after Charlie is onto the killer. But in “Hometown Hero,” once she determines that Rocket is the killer, the rest of the episode plays out in a very straightforward, unsurprising way." Melody McCune of Telltale TV gave the episode a 3 star rating out of 5 and wrote, "While “Hometown Hero” is far from perfect, there's still plenty to enjoy. I appreciate the show's willingness to swing for the fences in terms of silliness, especially the trippy imagery in this week's and last week's episodes. Here's hoping something, narratively or creatively, comes along to subvert certain aspects of the formula."
