= Sloppy Joseph =

- Poker Face episode
- Episode no.: Season 2 Episode 6
- Directed by: Adam Arkin
- Written by: Kate Thulin
- Cinematography by: Tari Segal
- Editing by: Paul Swain
- Original air date: May 29, 2025
- Running time: 44 minutes

Guest appearances
- Eva Jade Halford as Stephanie Pearce; Callum Vinson as Elijah Turner; David Krumholtz as J.B. Turner; Margo Martindale as Dr. Hamm; Adrienne C. Moore as Ms. Dee

Episode chronology
← Previous "Hometown Hero"	Next → "One Last Job"

"Sloppy Joseph" is the sixth episode of the second season of the American murder mystery comedy-drama television series Poker Face. It is the sixteenth overall episode of the series and was written by co-executive producer Kate Thulin, and directed by executive producer Adam Arkin. It was released on Peacock on May 29, 2025.

The series follows Charlie Cale, a woman with the ability to detect if people are lying, who is now embarking on a fresh start after criminal boss Beatrix Hasp cancels a hit on her. In the episode, Charlie gets a cafeteria job at a private school, and sets out to prove a student's innocence when the class pet is accidentally killed.

The episode received highly positive reviews from critics, who praised the episode's small scale, Arkin's directing and guest stars (particularly Halford and Vinson).

== Plot ==
Stephanie Pearce (Eva Jade Halford) is the top student of her class, always earning high praise from her teachers and topping the gold star chart by a wide margin. During a spelling bee contest, she incorrectly spells "Abracadabra" after complaining that it is not a real word. Her classmate Elijah Turner (Callum Vinson) correctly spells it out and wins the contest, earning 20 gold stars and almost catching up with Stephanie. However, an upcoming talent show is worth 30 gold stars.

Stephanie spies on Elijah, finding that he is going to perform a magic show in which he makes the class pet, a gerbil named Joseph, disappear after hitting it with a mallet. She sabotages the set, locking the compartment where Joseph is supposed to be safely placed. During the show, she distracts Elijah by threatening to project an embarrassing baby photo to the entire audience and flips the box upside down. During Elijah's show, he hits the box with the mallet, killing Joseph and splattering his classmates with blood. As everyone flees in panic, Stephanie stays seated, satisfied.

A few days prior, Charlie (Natasha Lyonne) takes a job at the Good Hope Academy cafeteria. She constantly argues with the principal, Dr. Hamm (Margo Martindale), but bonds with the janitor, J.B. (David Krumholtz). J.B. is the father of Elijah, who is allowed free tuition as long as J.B. works there. Elijah had decided to try magic as a hobby after his mother's death, though J.B. is worried about his lack of social skills. After the talent show's disaster, Charlie visits J.B., who is certain that Elijah's box set was sabotaged.

While covering for J.B.'s shift, Charlie begins to suspect Stephanie. She confronts her in the playground, noting she is lying about her jealousy, and also shows that she accidentally dropped one of her uniform's pins in J.B.'s office, indicating she was there to sabotage the act. Charlie finds evidence that Stephanie planned to humiliate Elijah with the slideshow before being summoned to Hamm's office, who fires her for harassing Stephanie. However, Hamm secretly meets with Charlie and reveals that Stephanie caught her stealing cash from the school box for her gambling addiction. Stephanie has been blackmailing her ever since, which is how she had access to J.B.'s office. Stephanie overhears, and mocks Charlie for failing to do anything.

Before leaving, Charlie stops by the class to feed the gerbils, and asks the teacher, Ms. Dee, for help. Elijah returns the following day, where he is welcomed by his classmates, who lie that Joseph did not die, having replaced him with another gerbil. Stephanie is upset, and her ire grows when her classmates decide to hand over their gold stars to Elijah. She leaves the classroom and steals the rest of the cash in the school box, and places it in J.B.'s jacket to frame him. Charlie records her actions and demands that she drop the blackmail. Stephanie shreds her pictures of Hamm's gambling and thievery, while Elijah and J.B. return to normalcy. In her car, Charlie finds that Stephanie left her a big gold star, warning that she will find her when she grows older. Seeing Stephanie watching her in the distance, Charlie speeds away.

== Production ==
=== Development ===
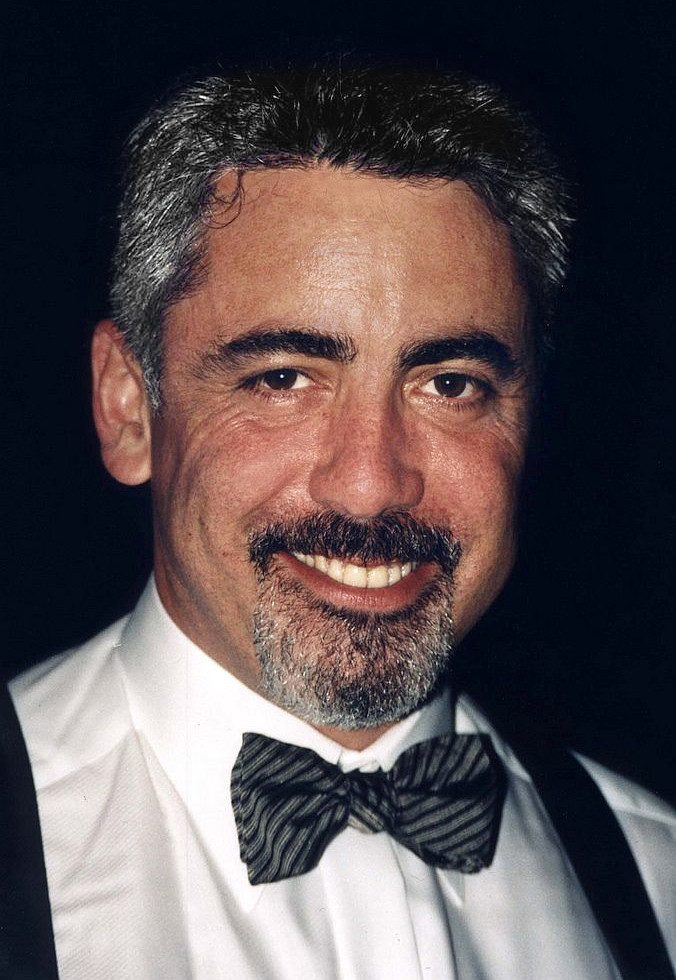
Adam Arkin directed the episode.

The series was announced in March 2021, with Rian Johnson serving as creator, writer, director and executive producer. Johnson stated that the series would delve into "the type of fun, character driven, case-of-the-week mystery goodness I grew up watching." The episode was written by co-executive producer Kate Thulin, and directed by executive producer Adam Arkin. This was Thulin's first writing credit, and Arkin's first directing credit for the show. According to Arkin, Johnson wanted to direct the episode but due to scheduling conflicts, asked Arkin to direct it instead based on his experience in directing kids.

Johnson said that for the season, "tonally and in terms of the ambitions of each episode and the style, I feel like they all take vastly different swings." He added, "The fact that the show can veer between tones like that, and then take a wild conceptual swing, like Adam Arkin's episode “Sloppy Joseph,” that's set in the grade school, I feel like is where I'm most excited about this season. The audience is never going to know what they're in for every time they hit play on the next episode, and that makes me happy."

=== Casting ===
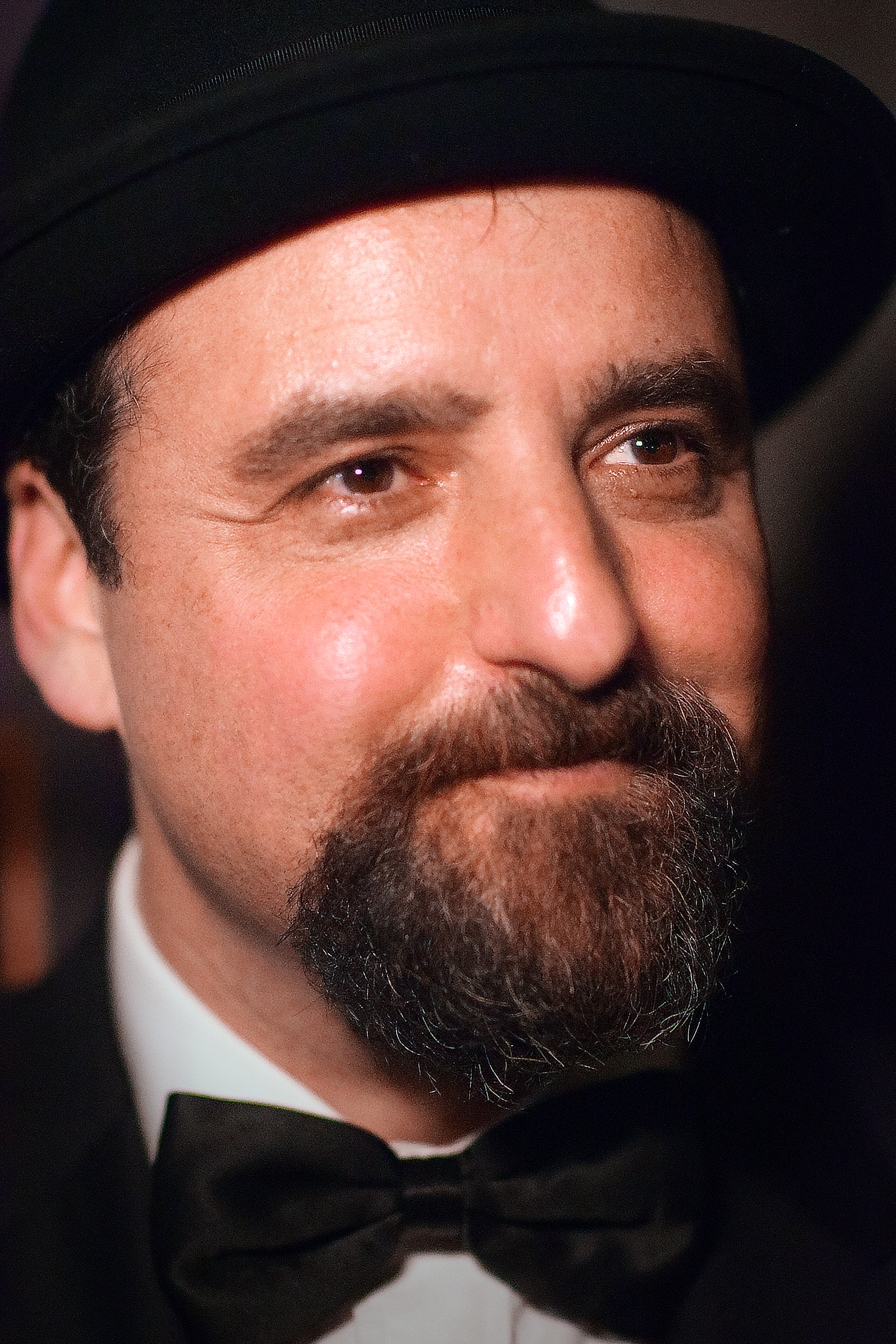
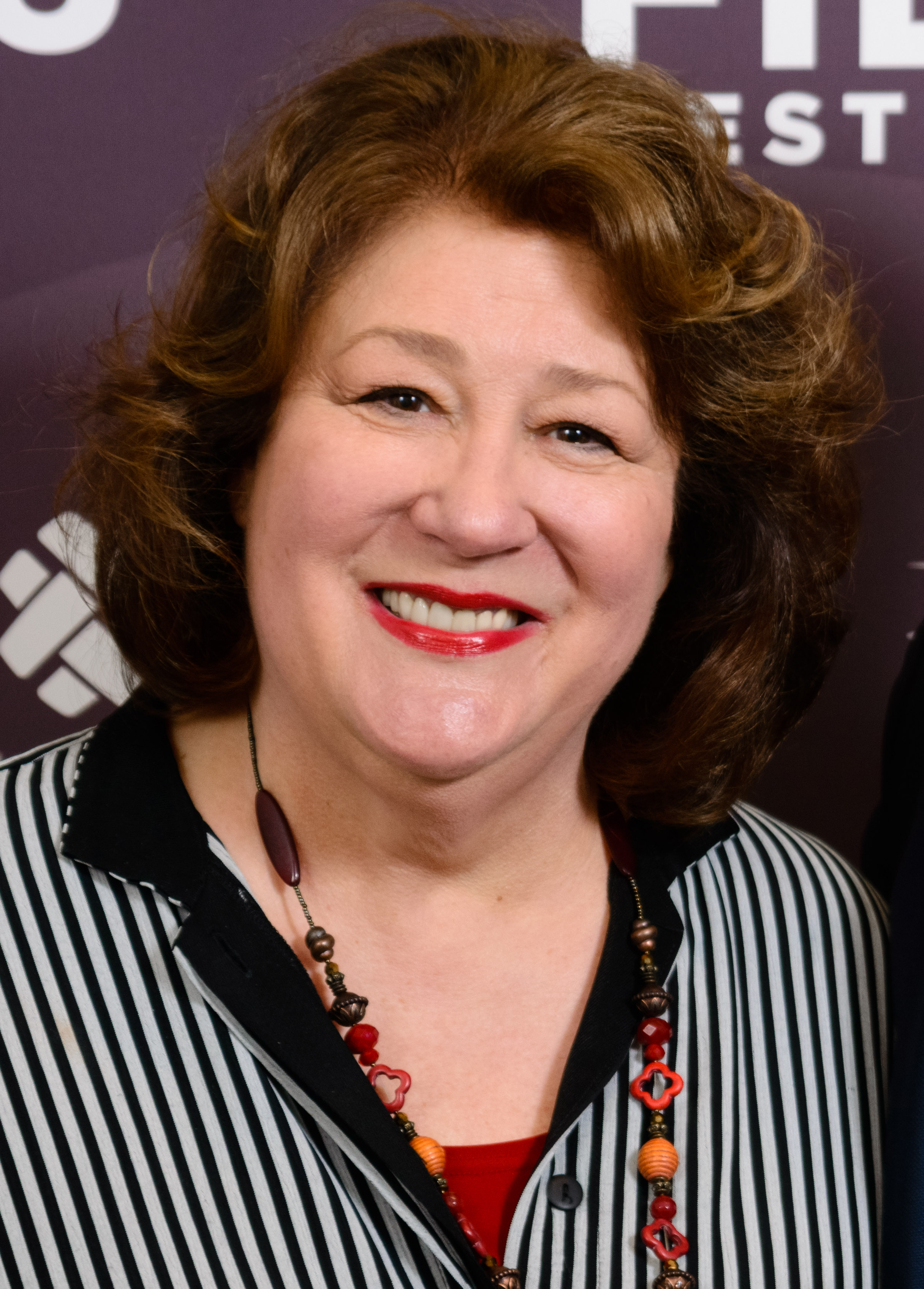
David Krumholtz and Margo Martindale guest star in the episode.

The announcement of the series included that Natasha Lyonne would serve as the main lead actress. She was approached by Johnson about working on a procedural project together, with Lyonne as the lead character. As Johnson explained, the role was "completely cut to measure for her."

Due to the series' procedural aspects, the episodes feature several guest stars. Johnson was inspired by the amount of actors who guest starred on Columbo, wanting to deem each guest star as the star of the episode, which allowed them to attract many actors. The episode featured guest appearances by Margo Martindale and David Krumholtz, who were announced to guest star in September 2024 and February 2025, respectively. Krumholtz and Lyonne previously starred in the 1998 film Slums of Beverly Hills, with Krumholtz commenting, "It wasn't lost on me that fans would watch this episode and recognize the reunion and then in a nostalgic way romanticize Slums of Beverly Hills. And it's a movie that should be romanticized." Coincidentally, Adam Arkin's father, Alan, also starred in the film.

Eva Jade Halford, who played Stephanie in the episode, commented on the episode, "It was really fascinating to watch the process and how they do things. I didn't really develop any habits from them, but for example — Adam was super particular with every single take that he would just want it to be just perfect. I think he had a vision, and I think he definitely made it come to life."

== Critical reception ==
"Sloppy Joseph" received highly positive reviews from critics. Noel Murray of The A.V. Club gave the episode a "B+" grade and wrote, "The playful, child-sized spin on a murder mystery is fun, if a bit light on plot twists; and there's some soulfulness to the way “Sloppy Joseph” digs into the root causes of Charlie's rootlessness. But honestly, my favorite parts of this episode are less about the crime and punishment and more about the heightened emotions and casual surrealism of childhood itself."

Alan Sepinwall wrote, "“Sloppy Joseph” is my favorite Poker Face of Season Two so far. It's another clever spin on the basic premise, this time with the murder victim being an elementary classroom pet with the incredible name “Joseph Gerbils.”"

Louis Peitzman of Vulture gave the episode a 3 star rating out of 5 and wrote, "In a howcatchem, there's no suspense over who did it and why; we just want to know how Charlie is going to put the pieces together. That doesn't mean endings aren't just as important, however, and “Sloppy Joseph” is an unfortunate reminder of how much a weak conclusion can undermine an otherwise strong episode. After last week's perfect final scene, I found myself extra let down by the show's inability to stick the landing here." Emma Fraser of The Daily Beast wrote, "Stephanie is given the killer in a horror movie treatment, with director Adam Arkin ensuring this episode walks the line between comic relief and terror, taking cues from Scream. Juggling these elements within the Poker Face parameters makes this an instant classic."

Ben Sherlock of Screen Rant wrote, "After an underwhelming installment last week, “Sloppy Joseph” is a return to form for Poker Face. It sets up a unique murder mystery, it escalates the stakes with unforeseen twists and turns, and it's anchored by two phenomenal child stars." Melody McCune of Telltale TV gave the episode a 4 star rating out of 5 and wrote, "Poker Face Season 2 Episode 6, “Sloppy Joseph,” sees the series take a creative swing for the fences with its silliest, campiest outing yet. It's a much-needed shot in the arm for the show, indicating a solid return to form after a few so-so installments."
