= The Sleazy Georgian =

- Poker Face episode
- Episode no.: Season 2 Episode 8
- Directed by: Mimi Cave
- Written by: Megan Amram
- Cinematography by: Jaron Presant
- Editing by: Paul Swain
- Original air date: June 12, 2025
- Running time: 48 minutes

Guest appearances
- Melanie Lynskey as Regina Gilvary; John Cho as Guy; Brendan Sexton III as Robin/Sketch; Joel Marsh Garland as Manny; GaTa as Gene; Eric Satterberg as David

Episode chronology
| ← Previous "One Last Job" | Next → "A New Lease on Death" |

"The Sleazy Georgian" is the eighth episode of the second season of the American murder mystery comedy-drama television series Poker Face. It is the eighteenth overall episode of the series and was written by Megan Amram, and directed by Mimi Cave. It was released on Peacock on June 12, 2025.

The series follows Charlie Cale, a woman with the ability to detect if people are lying, who is now embarking on a fresh start after criminal boss Beatrix Hasp cancels a hit on her. In the episode, Charlie finds herself involved in a scam run by a man who claims to steal money from other criminals.

The episode received critical acclaim, with critics praising the episode's deviation from the usual formula in the series.

== Plot ==
At a hotel bar in Philadelphia, Regina Gilvary (Melanie Lynskey) chats with a man named Alec (John Cho), noticing that many people are leaving him money in his duffel bag. Alec introduces himself as a former travel agent, and Regina takes an interest in him as she feels dissatisfied with her lonely, mundane life. At his hotel room, Alec explains that one of his clients is an exiled King of a place in Georgia, who has billions of dollars in Georgian lari. Alec helps him convert the lari into American dollars, earning a sizeable fee in the process.

Regina becomes interested and wants to be part of his scheme, which Alec refuses. When someone knocks the door, he has Regina hide in the bathroom while he meets with his handler. The man pulls a gun and kills Alec, prompting Regina to hide. As the man searches for her, Regina kills him with Alec's gun. She subsequently stages the scene to make it look like Alec killed the man and leaves with the bag containing $400,000.

Charlie (Natasha Lyonne) arrives at the hotel bar to cash a coupon, meeting Alec. Charlie notices that Alec is lying about everything about himself, including his name. Impressed, he takes her to meet his crew, revealing himself as Guy, a con man. He introduces her to bodyguard Manny (Joel Marsh Garland), accountant Gene (GaTa), and intern Cliff (Veronika Slowikowska). He explains that they use a scheme known as "The Sleazy Georgian", wherein they rob clients by making it appear like Guy has been shot by his handler, who is actually Manny. While Charlie opposes the idea of conning honest people, Guy claims they only steal from bad people who would kill for money.

The following day, Charlie confronts Guy, having learned he stole $20,000 from Regina, who had collected it on behalf of an orphan charity. She reveals that Regina committed suicide a few days earlier. Guy explains that Regina's greed got the best of her; she ignored all possible red flags and was willing to gamble the $20,000 to participate in his scheme, and he feels no remorse for her death. Charlie threatens to go to the police, unless Guy donates $20,000 to Regina's orphan fund. Manny interrupts them, having found a new potential mark at the hotel bar. Guy offers Charlie the chance to report them to the police, or help them with the new scam and get $20,000 for the fund. Charlie reluctantly accepts.

Guy and Charlie meet with the target, Sketch (Brendan Sexton III), a gambler. Sketch surprises them by claiming he can obtain $400,000 from his bank account, and he intends to return within one hour. Charlie tries to warn him away, but Guy stops her. When Sketch returns with the money, Charlie realizes that he has a gun and tries to get Guy to reveal his scheme. When Manny enters, Sketch shoots him and gets into a brawl with Charlie, accidentally shooting himself. Guy seizes the opportunity to escape with the satchel and returns to his crew to split the money, only to find coupons instead. Guy concludes that Charlie conned him, as police sirens are heard. Charlie is revealed to have conspired with Manny and Sketch, who is actually his husband Robin, to con Guy. They insist that Charlie take the money, and she donates it to Regina's charity.

== Production ==
=== Development ===
The series was announced in March 2021, with Rian Johnson serving as creator, writer, director and executive producer. Johnson stated that the series would delve into "the type of fun, character driven, case-of-the-week mystery goodness I grew up watching." The episode was written by Megan Amram, and directed by Mimi Cave. This was Amram's first writing credit, and Cave's first directing credit for the show.

According to showrunner Tony Tost, there was going to be a very different episode. He described the original episode as "some tech bros taking over a monastery and accidentally reinventing religion", with Charlie teaming up with a crow to solve the crime. While the script was completed, the idea was shelved and "The Sleazy Georgian" was made instead, which Tost believes was "the right call."

=== Casting ===
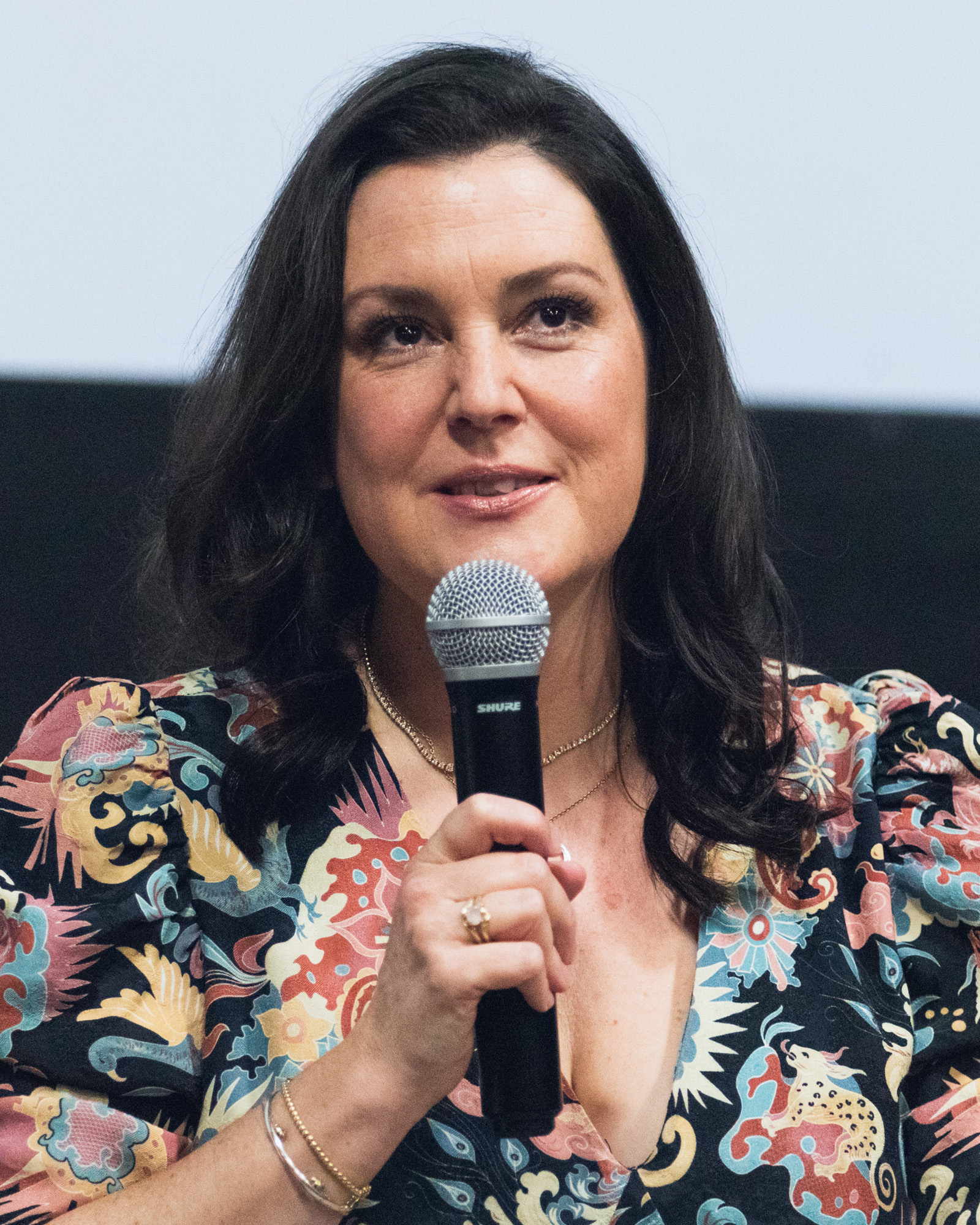
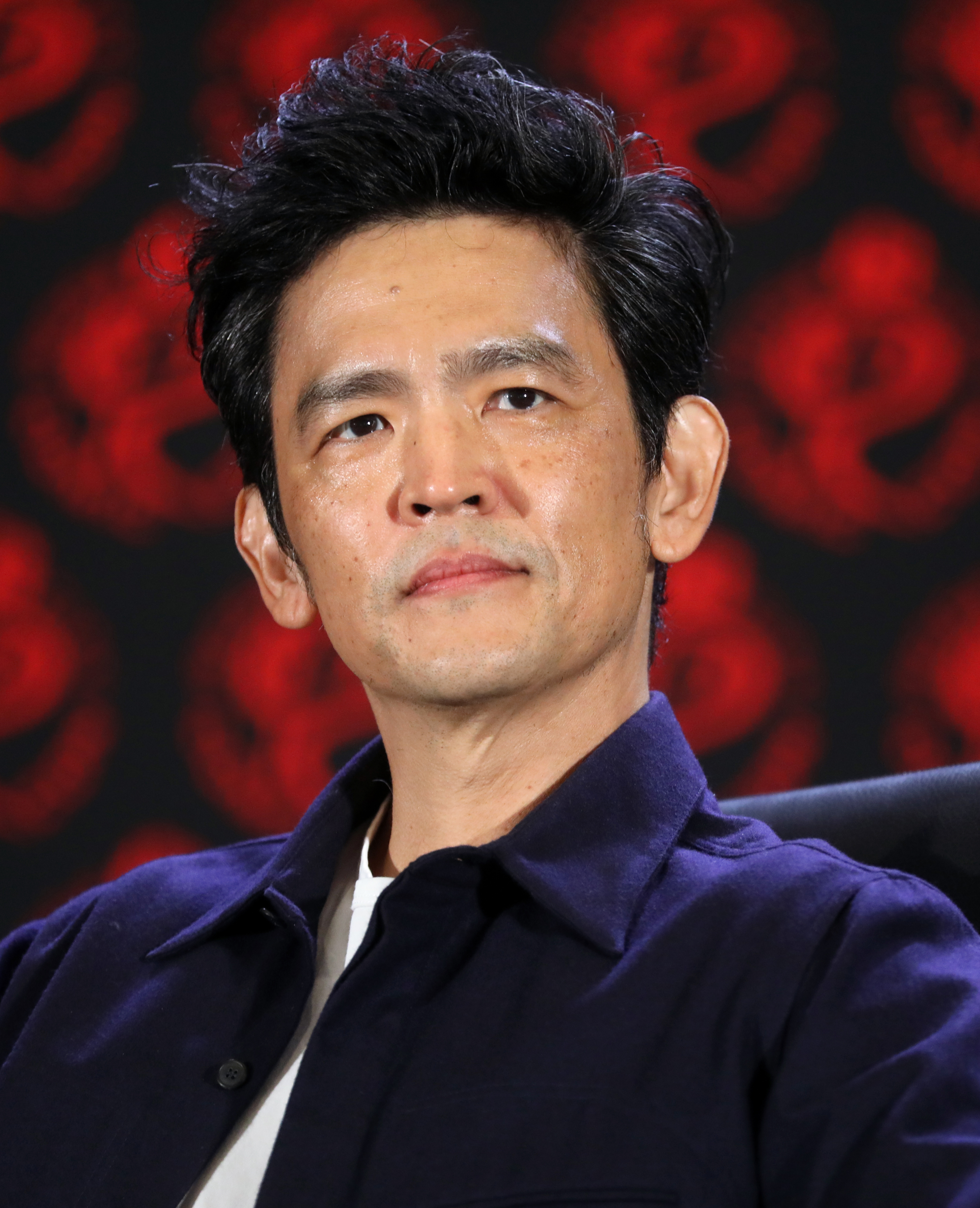
Melanie Lynskey and John Cho guest star in the episode.

The announcement of the series included that Natasha Lyonne would serve as the main lead actress. She was approached by Johnson about working on a procedural project together, with Lyonne as the lead character. As Johnson explained, the role was "completely cut to measure for her."

Due to the series' procedural aspects, the episodes feature several guest stars. Johnson was inspired by the amount of actors who guest starred on Columbo, wanting to deem each guest star as the star of the episode, which allowed them to attract many actors. The episode featured guest appearances by GaTa, John Cho, and Melanie Lynskey, who were announced to guest star in February 2025. Lynskey was offered a guest appearance earlier in the season, but her commitment to Yellowjackets delayed it until she was finally available. She said, "it's been a long time since I've done anything kind of light and funny. I was ready to sit in a hotel bar and be flirty with somebody. Also, I love the show so I really wanted to be part of it."

== Critical reception ==
"The Sleazy Georgian" received critical acclaim. Noel Murray of The A.V. Club gave the episode an "A–" grade and wrote, "As soon as I realized that this week's Poker Face was going to be about cons and double-crosses, I started trying to out-guess it. And while I got most of the way there, I never got all the way. I kept anticipating one more twist. But I'm actually glad it never came, because what doesn't happen in “The Sleazy Georgian” gives the episode a sting."

Alan Sepinwall wrote, "con jobs are a type of story I'm usually a sucker for, and this was a well-told one. Even though I knew in the back of my mind that Charlie was going to eventually find a way to scam the scammer, I still fell for the moment when the new mark had a gun and appeared to shoot the muscle, and was pleased when he turned out to be the muscle’s spouse, who hadn't been referred to with pronouns in earlier scenes." Louis Peitzman of Vulture gave the episode a perfect 5 star rating out of 5 and wrote, "The back half of Poker Face season two is already shaping up to be much more interesting than the first — and I say that as someone who mostly quite enjoyed the earlier six episodes! After last week's exceptional heist-movie rom-com, I was expecting something a bit more middle-of-the-road this week. Instead, we got another all-timer: a con-man story that smartly subverts the show’s typical formula and delivers one delicious twist after another. Ditching the threat of Beatrix Hasp has given the writers and Charlie room to stretch their wings, and at least for the time being, Poker Face is firing on all cylinders."

Ben Sherlock of Screen Rant wrote, "It's supposed to contain $400,000 in cash, but it actually contains all the hotel breakfast coupons that Charlie has been using to eat for free across the country. It was the perfect visual punchline on which to end one of Poker Face's strongest episodes to date." Melody McCune of Telltale TV gave the episode a 4.1 star rating out of 5 and wrote, "Poker Face Season 2 Episode 8, “The Sleazy Georgian,” subverts the show's trademark murder formula in favor of a delightful, fresh con artist story. Much like the last few episodes, it's a creative swing for the fences that successfully bears fruit, proving this series is capable of coloring outside the lines it sets for itself."
