= Jonica T. Gibbs =

American actress and comedian

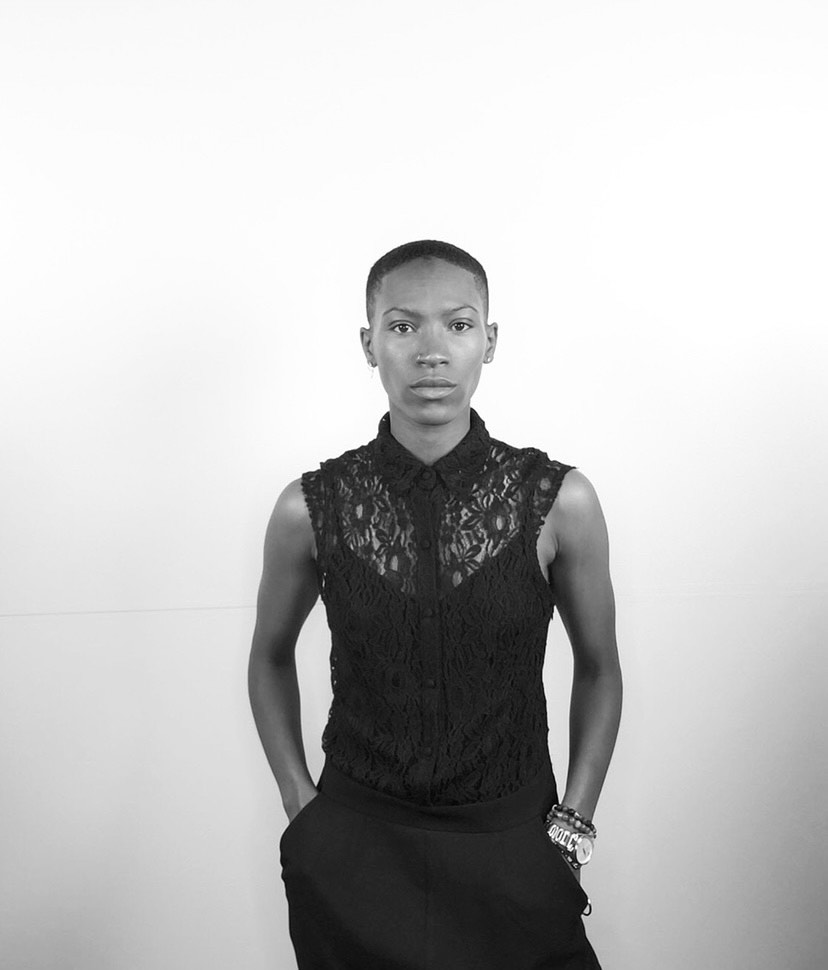
- Gibbs in 2018
- Born: Gaffney, South Carolina, U.S.
- Other names: JoJo T. Gibbs; Jojo T. Gibbs
- Occupations: Actress, comedian
- Years active: 2015–present
- Known for: Twenties
- Notable work: Fresh

Jonica T. Gibbs, credited as JoJo T. Gibbs and Jojo T. Gibbs since 2019, is an American actress and comedian. She plays the lead role of Hattie on the BET series Twenties.

== Early life and education ==
Gibbs was born in South Carolina and raised by her great-grandparents in Hampstead, North Carolina. She received her bachelor's degree in journalism from University of North Carolina at Chapel Hill. Negative experiences with faculty members in the department discouraged her from pursuing journalism. After graduation, she worked several jobs, including as a substitute teacher, and acted in student films at SCAD.

== Career ==
Gibbs moved to Los Angeles in 2015 to pursue acting professionally, a year after she began stand-up comedy. She and her close friend Rashonda Joplin started a production company and developed the web series No More Comics in L.A. They shot and financed two episodes and created a crowdfunding campaign to raise money for the remaining eight episodes. They reached out to a number of Black television creatives to market the campaign, including Lena Waithe.

Waithe invited Gibbs to audition for Twenties, which was her first audition. Gibbs was cast in the lead role as Hattie, a broke, queer, aspiring TV writer loosely based on Waithe's experiences. Gibbs has spoken about the significance of playing one of few masculine-of-center lesbians in American media.

Gibbs has a recurring role in Good Trouble and the scripted podcast The Left Right Game. Gibbs starred in the 2022 thriller Fresh.

== Personal life ==
Gibbs is openly gay. She came out to her mother at 19 after watching True Life: I'm Coming Out.

== Filmography ==
=== Television ===
Year	Title	Role	Notes
2019–2020	Good Trouble	Fundraiser Guest	Recurring role
2020	The Left Right Game	Eve (voice)	Podcast series
2020–2021	Twenties	Hattie	Main role
2021	Electric Easy	Omni / Martha (voice)	Podcast series

=== Film ===
Year	Title	Role	Notes
2022	Fresh	Mollie	
2022	Something from Tiffany's	Terri Blake	
2023	Past Lives	Janice	
2023	Dogman	Evelyn	
2024	Civil War	WF White House Sergeant	
	Dirty Angels	Geek	
