= One Last Job (Poker Face) =

- Poker Face episode
- Episode no.: Season 2 Episode 7
- Directed by: Adam Arkin
- Written by: Taofik Kolade
- Cinematography by: Christine Ng
- Editing by: Paul Swain
- Original air date: June 5, 2025
- Running time: 44 minutes

Guest appearances
- Sam Richardson as Kendall Hines; Corey Hawkins as Bill Jackson; James Ransone as Juice; Geraldine Viswanathan as Jenny; Abena as Tonya; Grasie Mercedes as Officer Grace Hardy; Jordan Dean as Officer Lancelot Judd

Episode chronology
← Previous "Sloppy Joseph"	Next → "The Sleazy Georgian"

"One Last Job" is the seventh episode of the second season of the American murder mystery comedy-drama television series Poker Face. It is the seventeenth overall episode of the series and was written by co-executive producer Taofik Kolade, and directed by executive producer Adam Arkin. It was released on Peacock on June 5, 2025.

The series follows Charlie Cale, a woman with the ability to detect if people are lying, who is now embarking on a fresh start after criminal boss Beatrix Hasp cancels a hit on her. In the episode, Charlie begins a relationship with the manager of a big box store. After a robbery places him as the main suspect, Charlie sets out to prove his innocence.

The episode received critical acclaim, with critics praising Arkin's directing, tone contrast, character development, and performances.

== Plot ==
In Washington, D.C., Kendall Hines (Sam Richardson) is an aspiring screenwriter who works as an electronics employee at SuperSave, a big-box store. His childhood friend, Bill Jackson (Corey Hawkins), is the store manager and they often discuss the film scripts that Kendall writes in his free time. Bill surprises Kendall by firing him, as he wants to invest money in security rather than employees due to recent robberies, encouraging him to move to Los Angeles and pursue his dream.

On his way out, Kendall finds a man stealing TVs and helps him leave without being detected. The man, Juice (James Ransone), buys him a drink at a bar, where Kendall reveals that his latest script One Last Job is based on SuperSave. Juice persuades him to help rob the store. Using store equipment, they start the robbery 30 minutes before the first employees arrive. When Juice leaves to inspect a noise nearby, Kendall stashes some of the money in his locker for himself. When Bill appears, Juice shoots him, unwilling to return to prison. He disposes of the body and they clean the scene before escaping.

A few days prior, Charlie (Natasha Lyonne) is working as a delivery girl for a local Indian restaurant. One night, she delivers food to Bill at SuperSave, and they form a connection. He continues making orders to the restaurant to see her. One day, he invites her to dinner for his birthday. Charlie comes to the store seeking advice on a gift, and befriends Kendall. That night, Bill shows Charlie his method of looping the camera feed, with a remote to call the police for emergencies, and explains that he is temporarily living in the store after a breakup. They end up kissing and having sex, with Charlie considering starting a new life in town with Bill.

After a weekend passes without Bill calling, Charlie is called to deliver to SuperSave. There, she finds police cruisers and a news reporter naming Bill as their prime suspect. Juice brings Kendall his share of the money and reveals that he "took care" of Bill's body by dressing him as the Santa Claus at the store's Christmas display. Kendall returns to the store, but is blocked from his locker by police presence. Noticing a naked mannequin nearby, Charlie discovers Bill's corpse in the Santa costume. When talking to the police, Charlie is confused by the use of a Polaroid to block the cameras.

Returning home, Kendall is confronted by Juice over his deception. Kendall accidentally stabs Juice with his katana. In the break room, Charlie finds the extra money in Kendall's locker, but Kendall stops her at gunpoint. Charlie reveals she has called the police using Bill's remote. A still-impaled Juice arrives, demanding the money. He pulls out the katana to attack her but collapses from his injuries; Kendall is apprehended by police. Charlie looks on as the final scene of Heat plays on the TVs.

== Production ==
=== Development ===
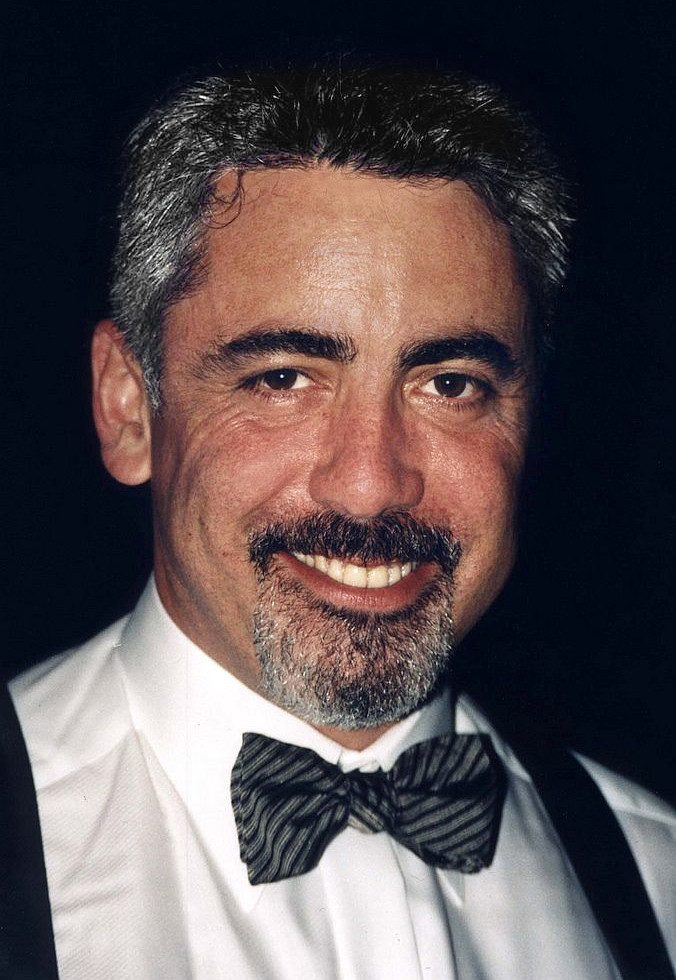
Adam Arkin directed the episode.

The series was announced in March 2021, with Rian Johnson serving as creator, writer, director and executive producer. Johnson stated that the series would delve into "the type of fun, character driven, case-of-the-week mystery goodness I grew up watching." The episode was written by co-executive producer Taofik Kolade, and directed by executive producer Adam Arkin. This was Kolade's first writing credit, and Arkin's second directing credit for the show. Arkin was attracted in directing the episode, saying "I like to think of myself as a film buff. I certainly love, and I feel like my my [sic] desire to be in this business, was informed by my love of being around films and watching films being made. This definitely had components in it that felt like a nod to all of my own background."

=== Casting ===
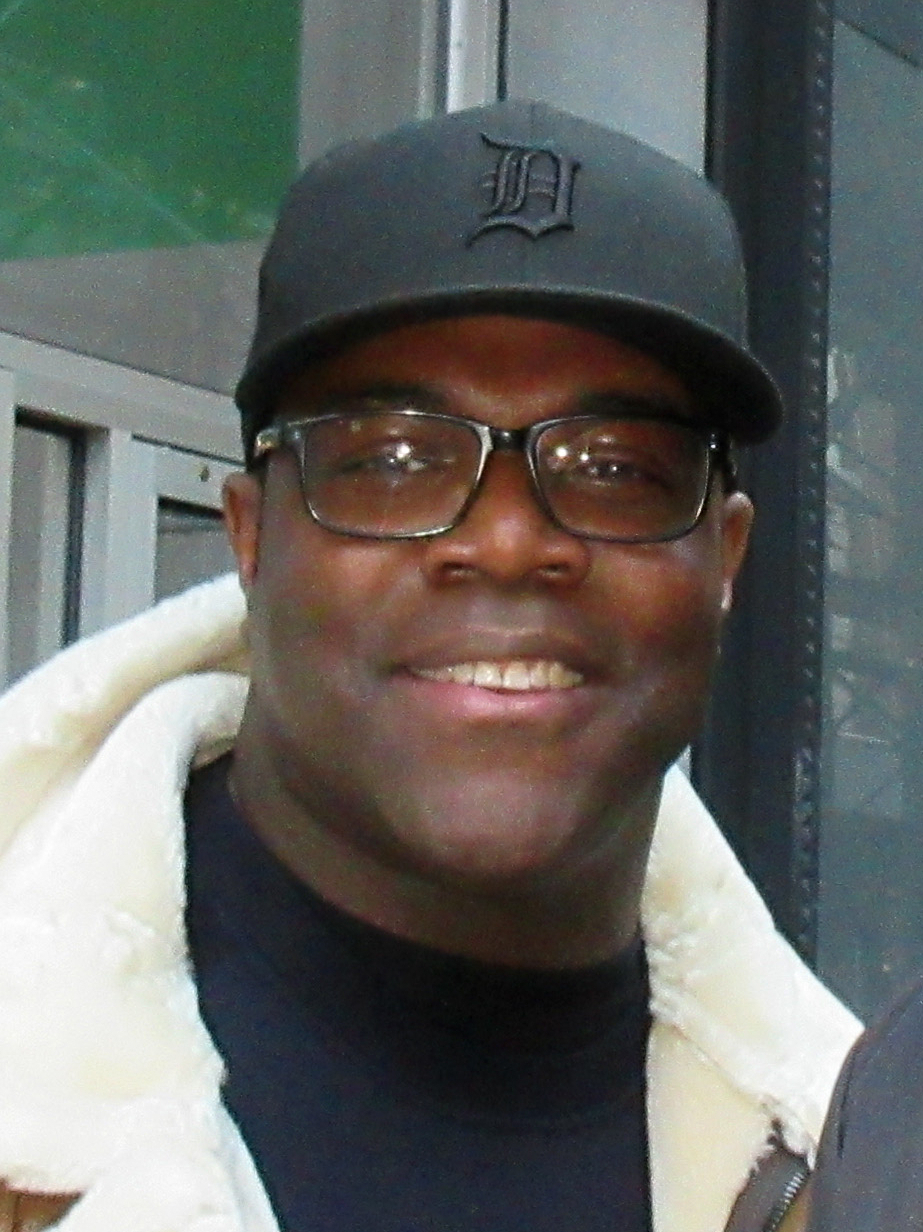
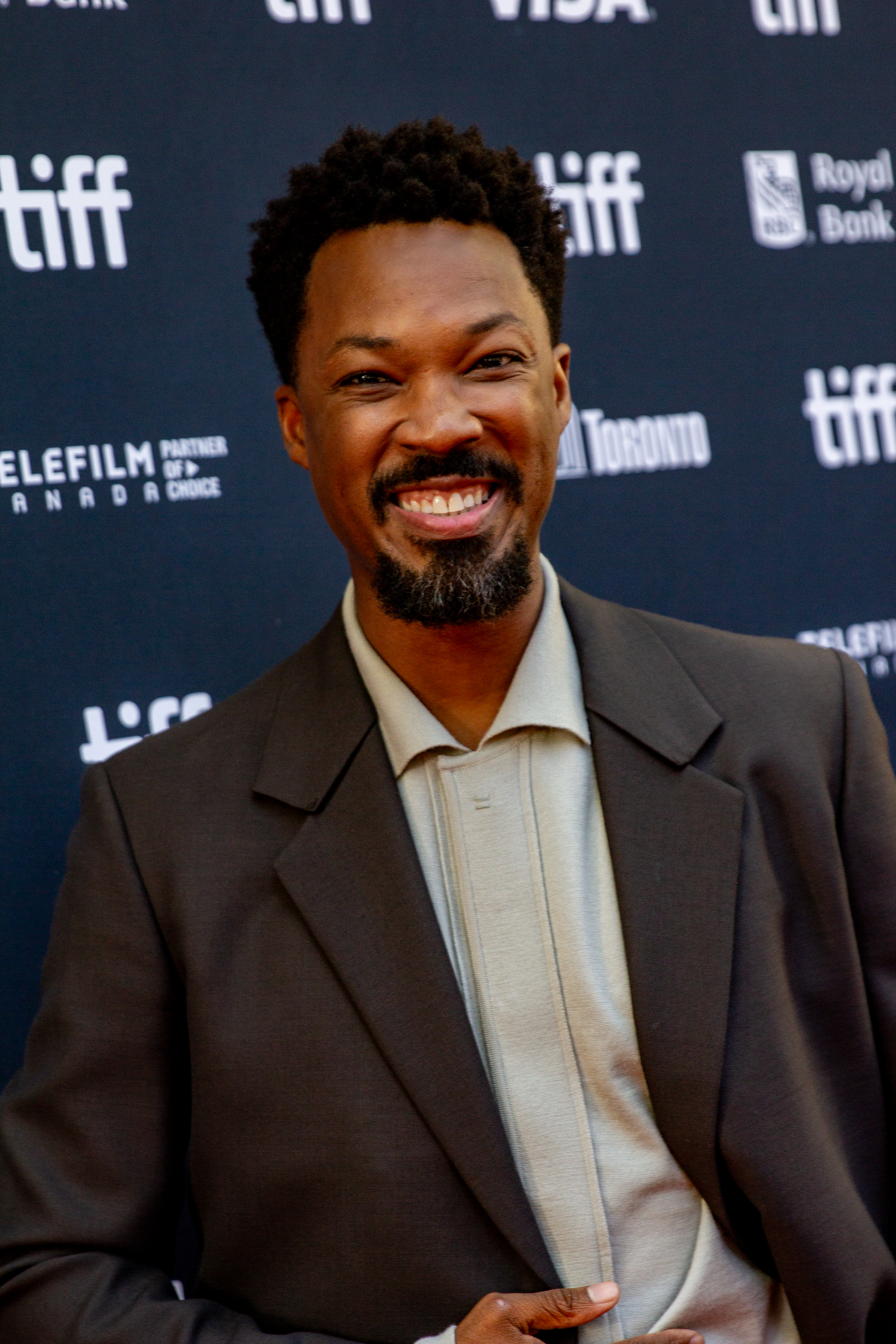
Sam Richardson and Corey Hawkins guest star in the episode.

The announcement of the series included that Natasha Lyonne would serve as the main lead actress. She was approached by Johnson about working on a procedural project together, with Lyonne as the lead character. As Johnson explained, the role was "completely cut to measure for her."

Due to the series' procedural aspects, the episodes feature several guest stars. Johnson was inspired by the amount of actors who guest starred on Columbo, wanting to deem each guest star as the star of the episode, which allowed them to attract many actors. The episode featured guest appearances by Sam Richardson, Corey Hawkins, and Geraldine Viswanathan, who were announced to guest star in October and November 2024, and March 2025, respectively.

=== Writing ===
Arkin said that he was interested in exploring Charlie's relationship with Bill in the store, "There was very little I had to do, except stay out of the way and make sure we filmed it correctly because there was a spark between the two of them and I think that's really palpable in the episode. I really loved the date that they have in the empty store." Natasha Lyonne also explained Charlie's role in the episode, "I guess the sadness maybe for Charlie is realizing sometimes that home is in another person, which is maybe its own kind of a sickness, a faulty belief system we have as a people, or maybe it's actually the truth. I've often found that in this life. I take a look at this guy [Rian Johnson], I like him. Whenever he's around, that feels safe."

== Critical reception ==
"One Last Job" received critical acclaim. Noel Murray of The A.V. Club gave the episode an "A–" grade and wrote, "What I liked most about this episode — and what I'm enjoying about this season — is that while it smashes together a bunch of references and movie modes, it's not particularly beholden to any one. Towards the end of season one, I felt this show began to find its own voice once it weaved away from being a mere Columbo homage and figured out how to tell stories in a Poker Face-y way, taking advantage of the shorter running time, the varied locations, and the unique blend of optimism and dissatisfaction that defines Charlie Cale."

Alan Sepinwall wrote, "This is a tricky tonal balance, and there are many ways it could have fallen apart. But Hawkins and Natasha Lyonne are very good together. And Richardson gets to play Kendall with just enough depth that he feels like a person, when he could easily come across as an I Think You Should Leave character." Louis Peitzman of Vulture gave the episode a perfect 5 star rating out of 5 and wrote, "Part of the appeal of a series like Poker Face, which delivers new characters, settings, and stories each week, is the way it gets to dabble in different genres. But “One Last Job” is the first time I can remember this show so consciously embracing the tropes of two at once: the heist movie and the rom-com. The pairing doesn't necessarily seem natural until you consider that the episode is heavily indebted to the work of Michael Mann — and that Mann, for all his apparently macho trappings, is secretly our most romantic filmmaker. The crime-romance mash-up results in the best episode of the season so far, one that embraces heightened self-awareness without losing its grounded emotional core."

Ben Sherlock of Screen Rant wrote, "As a big fan of both heist movies and romcoms, I really enjoyed Poker Face's two-for-one genre parody. “One Last Job” features a handful of memorable guest performances as usual — particularly by Richardson as a cinephile who tries his hand at a movie crime — and it was refreshing to see Charlie open up emotionally and allow herself to be vulnerable." Melody McCune of Telltale TV gave the episode a 4 star rating out of 5 and wrote, "Overall, “One Last Job” is well-paced and action-packed, delivering a few decent twists along the way. It's a creative swing for the fences that pans out well for the show and implements a delightful mix of levity and darkness."
