= Really Doe (Danny Brown song) =

Single by Danny Brown featuring Kendrick Lamar, Ab-Soul and Earl Sweatshirt

from the album Atrocity Exhibition
- Released: September 20, 2016
- Genre: Hip hop
- Length: 5:19
- Label: Warp
- Songwriters: Daniel Sewell; Herbert Stevens IV; Kendrick Duckworth; Thebe Kgositsile; Curtis Cross; Giovanni Cristiani
- Producer: Black Milk

Danny Brown singles chronology
"Pneumonia" (2016)	"Really Doe" (2016)	"Ain't It Funny" (2017)

Kendrick Lamar singles chronology
"Freedom" (2016)	"Really Doe" (2016)	"Don't Wanna Know" (2016)

Ab-Soul singles chronology
"Illest Nigga Ever" (2016)	"Really Doe" (2016)	"Huey Knew THEN" (2016)

Earl Sweatshirt singles chronology
"Grief" (2015)	"Really Doe" (2016)	"Nowhere2go" (2018)

"Really Doe" is a song by American hip hop recording artist Danny Brown, released as the third single from his fourth studio album, Atrocity Exhibition (2016). It was produced by Black Milk, and features additional verses from fellow American rappers Kendrick Lamar, Ab-Soul and Earl Sweatshirt, with the hook sung by Lamar. It was released on September 20, 2016, by Warp Records.

== Background ==
In an interview with NPR, Danny Brown said:

Me and Kendrick always talked about doing stuff, and I had the idea to get K.Dot and Earl together ... but first I got me and Ab-Soul. And then one day when I was mixing the album with Ali, K.Dot snuck in and just laced it. I had to be patient and wait on Earl, but it was all worth it you know because Hip-Hop needs that posse cut. We just wanna make the best possible song cause we know the hype on paper. I know it's gonna satisfy, my feet is up.

In April 2020, during a Twitch stream, Brown detailed his falling out with Ab-Soul after discovering that the track included more artists than just the two of them. According to Brown, Ab-Soul subsequently removed Brown's verse from the 2016 song "Huey Knew" and replaced him with fellow American rapper Da$H. During the stream, Brown also revealed that he had not initially intended to feature anyone on the song: "'Really Doe' was a song that was done. It was never a posse cut," he said, explaining that Kendrick Lamar recorded on the track while Brown was out in Los Angeles working with TDE's MixedByAli. Brown originally had two verses on "Really Doe" and had wanted Lamar on a different track: "If you listen to that song ... I feel like he set up to body me. That's how I looked at it." He would go on and turn it into a posse cut including Earl Sweatshirt. Ab-Soul later expressed his displeasure in a tweet that read "Originally 'Really doe' was just me n Danny. Had I known we were having company I would've used a different cadence," referring to how he wrote his verse to complement Brown's own verse.

Brown also detailed how he had trouble sequencing the verses on "Really Doe" after many of his friends and collaborators claimed Earl Sweatshirt's verse was "trash" in comparison to the others: "Everybody felt like Kendrick's verse should go last," he said. "You know me, I'm a battle rap fan. I'm a rapper fan ... Earl bodied all of us."

== Release and promotion ==
On September 19, 2016, Peter Rosenberg of New York City-based radio station Hot 97, premiered "Really Doe", after given permission from Danny Brown. "Really Doe" was later released as the album's third and final single via digital distribution on September 20. In an interview, Brown revealed that Kendrick Lamar was responsible for the creation of "Really Doe." On November 1, 2016, a lyric video for "Really Doe" was released. It features clips of live performances from each artist while the lyrics scroll up the screen.

== Critical reception ==
"Really Doe" received critical acclaim from contemporary music critics. The song was chosen upon release as Pitchfork's "Best New Track". Sheldon Pearce stated that, "They rip with reckless abandon. Though they each have their own particular methods—Danny bawls out quick-striking and unorthodox zingers, Ab-Soul imparts stoner wisdom through careful pronunciations, Kendrick winds knotty head-scratchers, and Earl packs dense wordplay in carefully unspooling schemes—they work well as a group, filling the crags of Milk's thwacking production with kinetic flows. "They say I got the city on fire," Kendrick crows on the hook—and honestly, that applies to pretty much everyone here."

== Track listing ==
Digital download
No.	Title	Length
1.	"Really Doe" (featuring Kendrick Lamar, Ab-Soul & Earl Sweatshirt)	5:19

== Release history ==
Region	Date	Format	Label	Ref.
United States	September 19, 2016	Radio premiere	Warp	
United States	September 20, 2016	Digital download	Warp	
