= When It Rain =

2016 single by Danny Brown

Single by Danny Brown

from the album Atrocity Exhibition
- Released: June 14, 2016
- Recorded: 2016
- Genre: Alternative hip hop
- Length: 3:20
- Label: Warp
- Songwriter(s): Daniel Sewell; Paul White
- Producer(s): Paul White

Danny Brown singles chronology
"Frankie Sinatra" (2016)	"When It Rain" (2016)	"Pneumonia" (2016)

Music video
- Music video on YouTube

"When It Rain" is a song by American hip hop recording artist Danny Brown, released as the lead single from his fourth studio album Atrocity Exhibition. It was produced by Paul White. The single was released digitally on June 14, 2016.

== Music video ==
The music video for "When It Rain" was directed by Mimi Cave and released on June 14, 2016, on the official Danny Brown Vevo YouTube channel. The song's music video has over 5 million views on YouTube as of March 2024.

== Track listing ==
Digital download
No.	Title	Writer(s)	Producer	Length
1.	"When It Rain"	Daniel Sewell; Paul White	White	3:20
