= Twenties (TV series) =

American comedy television series

- Official promotional poster
- Genre: Comedy
- Created by: Lena Waithe
- Written by: Lena Waithe
- Starring: Jonica T. Gibbs; Christina Elmore; Gabrielle Graham
- Composer: Amanda Jones
- Country of origin: United States
- Original language: English
- No. of seasons: 2
- No. of episodes: 18

Production
- Executive producers: Lena Waithe; Susan Fales-Hill; Rishi Rajani; Andrew Coles; Justin Tipping; Deborah Evans
- Camera setup: Single-camera
- Running time: 30 minutes
- Production companies: Hillman Grad; DAE Light Media

Original release
- Network: BET
- Release: March 4, 2020 – December 15, 2021

Twenties is an American single-camera comedy series created by Lena Waithe. The plot is semi-autobiographical and follows "a queer black girl, Hattie, and her two straight best friends, Marie and Nia, who spend most of their days talking 'ish' and chasing their dreams." The show stars Jonica T. Gibbs, Christina Elmore, Gabrielle Graham, Sophina Brown, and Big Sean. It premiered on BET on March 4, 2020. In June 2020, the series was renewed for a second season, which premiered on October 13, 2021.

== Plot ==
The scripted comedy series follows a queer black woman in her twenties, Hattie (Jonica T. Gibbs), and her two straight best friends, Marie (Christina Elmore) and Nia (Gabrielle Graham), as they try to find their footing in life, love, and the professional world in Los Angeles.

== Cast ==
- Jonica T. Gibbs as Hattie, a lesbian aspiring screenwriter
- Christina Elmore as Marie, a television studio executive
- Gabrielle Graham as Nia, a yoga teacher
- Sophina Brown as Ida B, Hattie's boss
- Big Sean as Tristan, Nia's love interest

=== Recurring ===
- Madeleine Byrne as Lauren
- Shylo Shaner as Idina
- Ashli Haynes as Courtney
- Parker Young as Zach
- Alex Akpobome as Ben
- Donnell Rawlings as Dwayne

=== Guest stars ===
- Jevon McFerrin as Chuck
- Rick Fox as Richard, Chuck's father
- Iman Shumpert as Quintrell
- Kym Whitley as Esther, Hattie's mom
- Vanessa Williams as Angela, Chuck's mother
- Nazanin Mandi as Soraya
- Louie Anderson as Maurice

== Episodes ==
=== Series overview ===
Season	Episodes	Originally released	
Season	Episodes	First released	Last released
1	8	March 4, 2020	April 15, 2020
2	10	October 13, 2021	December 15, 2021

=== Season 1 (2020) ===
Twenties, season 1 episodes
No. overall	No. in season	Title	Directed by	Written by	Original release date	U.S. viewers (millions)
1	1	"Pilot"	Justin Simien	Lena Waithe	March 4, 2020	0.56
2	2	"I've Got the World on A String"	Tiffany Johnson	Lena Waithe	March 4, 2020	0.45
3	3	"Happy Place"	Tiffany Johnson	Daniel Willis	March 11, 2020	0.47
4	4	"You Know How I Like It"	Juel Taylor	Kimiko Matsuda-Lawrence	March 18, 2020	0.56
5	5	"Ain't Nothing Like The Real Thing"	Juel Taylor	Naomi Iwamoto	March 25, 2020	0.53
6	6	"Redemption Song"	Justin Tipping	Keli Goff	April 1, 2020	0.52
7	7	"What Would Todd Do?"	Justin Tipping	Patricia Ione Lloyd	April 8, 2020	0.49
8	8	"Living The Dream"	Justin Tipping	Azie Dungey	April 15, 2020	0.51

=== Season 2 (2021) ===
Twenties, season 2 episodes
No. overall	No. in season	Title	Directed by	Written by	Original release date	U.S. viewers (millions)
9	1	"One Night Only?"	Diego Velasco	Susan Fales-Hill	October 13, 2021	0.49
10	2	"Special Delivery"	Diego Velasco	Daniel Willis	October 20, 2021	0.49
11	3	"Killing Me Softly with His Song"	Steven Tsuchida	LaDarian Smith	October 27, 2021	0.63
12	4	"Everything"	Steven Tsuchida	M. Cornish	November 3, 2021	0.56
13	5	"Cop or Drop?"	Malakai	Naomi Iwamoto	November 10, 2021	0.46
14	6	"Epiphany"	Malakai	Patricia Ione Lloyd	November 17, 2021	0.59
15	7	"Dancing in the Moonlight"	Cierra Glaude	Kimiko Matsuda-Lawrence	November 24, 2021	0.49
16	8	"New Beginnings"	Jingyi Shao	Naomi Iwamoto	December 1, 2021	0.60
17	9	"Everything I Wanted"	Jingyi Shao	Brenson Thomas	December 8, 2021	0.52
18	10	"How Do You Feel?"	Cierra Glaude	M. Cornish	December 15, 2021	0.54

== Twenties After-Show With B. Scott ==
No.	Title	Original release date	U.S. viewers (millions)
1	"Lena Waithe & Jonica T. Gibbs"	October 13, 2021	0.31
2	"Iman Shumpert NBA player and & JessHilarious"	October 20, 2021	0.31
3	"Xavier Watson & Amber Whittingham"	October 27, 2021	0.37
4	"Jevon McFerrin & Crystal Anderson"	November 3, 2021	0.32
5	"Sophina Brown, Derica Cole Washington & Rich Fresh"	November 10, 2021	0.27
6	"Kenya Moore & Shylo Shaner"	November 17, 2021	0.40
7	"Parker Young & Christina Elmore"	November 24, 2021	0.26
8	"Estelle, David Bernard Jones, Lea Robinson"	December 1, 2021	0.38
9	"Donnell Rawling & Nia Jervier"	December 8, 2021	0.34
10	"Jonica T. Gibbs, Big Sean & Gabrielle Graham"	December 15, 2021	0.32

== Production ==
=== Development ===
Lena Waithe wrote the series when she was in her twenties based on her experience of Los Angeles when she first moved there. She stated that she was intentional about creating a series starring a "masculine-presenting stud" with straight friends because that was her own personal experience. Waithe asked Susan Fales-Hill to help her produce the series, which was initially in talks to be produced by BET, then landed at Hulu before being picked up by BET again. It is the first series on the network to center a queer lead character.

On April 15, 2019, BET announced that they had ordered the eight-episode comedy series, Twenties, written by Lena Waithe. Waithe is the co-showrunner with Fales-Hill. The two are also executive producers with Rishi Rajani and Andrew Coles. The director of the pilot, and co-executive producer is Justin Tipping.

Of her experience filming Twenties, Waithe stated that BET gave no notes and was supportive of the producers' creative vision.

On June 26, 2020, BET renewed the series for a second season. A talk show hosted by B. Scott, Twenties After-Show With B. Scott, premiered on October 13, 2021.

=== Release ===
The series premiered on March 4, 2020. The second season premiered on October 13, 2021.

== Critical reception ==
Twenties has received "generally favorable reviews" according to aggregator Metacritic, where it received a score of 73/100. It received a 93% rating on Rotten Tomatoes and is described in the critics consensus, "sharply written and hilarious relatable, Twenties is another impressive series from creator Lena Waithe that also announces Jonica T. Gibbs as a talent to watch."

In a review for Variety, Caroline Framke wrote, "In large part thanks to Gibbs' appealingly loose performance, it's entertaining to watch Hattie figure out how to break into the business, but without any clear motivations pushing her, it's frustratingly ephemeral. If she and Twenties want to be memorable, they both have to figure out what's actually driving them to do it." In a less positive review, Kellee Terrell of The A.V. Club stated: "Pilots are always tricky because they have to introduce viewers to new characters and rules, but the hyperfocus on Blackness distracts from the real issue at hand: [] character development."

=== Accolades ===
Year	Award	Category	Recipient(s)	Result	Ref.
2022	GLAAD Media Awards	Outstanding Comedy Series	Twenties	Nominated	
