= Mimi Cave =

American filmmaker

Mimi Cave is an American filmmaker and film producer. She is known for directing the horror film Fresh (2022) and the comedy-mystery film Holland (2025). Cave began her career in dance, music videos, and theatre described as utilising an "eerie" and "disquieting" style.

== Filmography ==
Short film

- Vessel (2015) (Also producer and writer)
- I'm Happy, I Promise (2019)

Feature film

- Fresh (2022)
- Holland (2025)
- Pumping Black (2027) (Also producer)

Television

| Year | Title | Episode |
|---|---|---|
| 2025 | Poker Face | "The Sleazy Georgian" |

Music video

| Year | Title | Artist |
|---|---|---|
| 2011 | "Bizness" | Tune-Yards |
| 2014 | "Turn It Around" | Lucius |
| 2015 | "Whip It!" | LunchMoney Lewis Feat. Chloe Angelides |
| 2016 | "When It Rain" | Danny Brown |
| 2017 | "And Saints" | Sleigh Bells |
| 2017 | "Die Young" | Sylvan Esso |
| 2018 | "We're Going Home" | Vance Joy |

== Personal life ==
Cave is originally from St. Charles, Illinois, the daughter of Marjorie (née Morris) and Robert A. Cave. She received her degree from Colorado College. She has a sister Elizabeth Ashley Himes and a brother named Charles Alden Cave. Cave has a pet doodle, Olive.
