= Fresh (2022 film) =

Horror film by Mimi Cave

- Release poster
- Directed by: Mimi Cave
- Written by: Lauryn Kahn
- Produced by: Adam McKay; Kevin Messick
- Starring: Daisy Edgar-Jones; Sebastian Stan; Jonica T. Gibbs; Charlotte Le Bon; Andrea Bang; Dayo Okeniyi; Brett Dier
- Cinematography: Pawel Pogorzelski
- Edited by: Martin Pensa
- Music by: Alex Somers
- Production companies: Hyperobject Industries; Legendary Pictures
- Distributed by: Searchlight Pictures
- Release dates: January 20, 2022 (Sundance); March 4, 2022
- Running time: 114 minutes
- Country: United States
- Language: English
- Budget: $15–20 million

Fresh is a 2022 American horror thriller film directed by Mimi Cave, in her directorial debut, from a screenplay by Lauryn Kahn. The film stars Daisy Edgar-Jones and Sebastian Stan. It is a co-production between Legendary Pictures and Hyperobject Industries; Adam McKay produced the film alongside Kevin J. Messick.

Fresh had its world premiere at the Sundance Film Festival on January 20, 2022, and was released on March 4, 2022, via Hulu by Searchlight Pictures in the United States and Disney+ via Star internationally, marking the first Legendary film released by Disney rather than Warner Bros. Pictures, Universal Pictures or Netflix. The film received generally positive reviews from critics.

== Plot ==
Noa, a woman from Portland, is increasingly disillusioned with online dating and the crass men she encounters. A man calling himself Steve flirts with her at a supermarket and they exchange numbers. On their first date, the two form a bond. After several dates, Steve invites Noa for a weekend getaway to a surprise destination. Against the advice of her best friend Mollie, Noa agrees. Planning to travel early the following day, Noa spends the evening at Steve's luxury home, but he drugs her cocktail and she collapses.

Noa awakens in captivity, chained to the floor. Steve explains that he is a butcher of human meat, which he both consumes and sells to wealthy gastronomic cannibals (Note: Gastronomic cannibals eat human flesh for culinary appreciation, without any cultural or religious ceremony.) for whom he regularly lures and abducts young women. He informs Noa that he will keep her alive as long as possible in order to keep her meat fresh as he intends to surgically remove pieces of her body over time. Noa speaks to a woman named Penny who is being held captive in an adjacent cell, who says that she has suffered multiple meat harvests and that another woman, Melissa, has gone insane. Noa attempts to escape when given an opportunity to shower and Steve harvests meat from her buttocks as punishment.

Meanwhile, Mollie becomes concerned about Noa's disappearance and begins investigating with her friend Paul, a bartender who served Noa and Steve on their first date. After searching online, Mollie discovers Steve is actually named Brendan and is married to a woman named Ann with whom he has children. Mollie visits Ann and informs her of Brendan's apparent affair. Brendan arrives and denies any knowledge of Noa when questioned by Mollie. As she leaves, Mollie calls Noa's phone, which begins ringing in Brendan's pocket. Ann, realizing she's been exposed, knocks Mollie unconscious. In a shower scene, Ann is shown to have a prosthetic leg.

Noa learns from Penny that she is the only prisoner who had sex with Brendan. She makes herself more alluring and pretends to be curious about the taste of human meat. Brendan invites her to share a gourmet dish of human meat with him, which Noa pretends to enjoy but secretly vomits up. Meanwhile, Brendan takes Mollie away for harvesting. Brendan invites Noa to a formal dinner, providing her a pink dress to wear. Between dishes, Brendan shows Noa a concealed case containing the belongings of two dozen victims; amongst the trophies, Noa recognizes Mollie's phone. Following dinner and dancing, Noa persuades Brendan to have sex with her and let her perform fellatio on him; she injures him by biting his penis. Noa helps Mollie and Penny escape their cells while Brendan attends to his injury. After using the dumbwaiter to carry amputee Penny out of the basement, the three fight Brendan in the kitchen, then escape into the woods. Brendan pursues them with a handgun.

In the meantime, Paul becomes concerned when Mollie doesn't respond to messages and follows the location of her phone to Brendan's house. However, he questions what he is doing and drives away upon hearing gunshots.

In the woods, Noa, Mollie, and Penny attack Brendan again. Noa takes the gun and shoots him dead. Ann arrives, finds Brendan's body, and orders a companion to put it in the walk-in freezer. Ann encounters Noa in the woods and tries to strangle her, but Noa stabs Ann in the neck with car keys. As Ann recovers and attempts to strangle Noa again, Mollie bludgeons Ann to death with a shovel. Noa and Mollie relax at last, and Noa receives a booty call text from a toxic man she dated before Brendan.

A mid-credits scene depicts five of Brendan's clients in a white room, seated at a table with bleeding human meat at the center.

== Cast ==
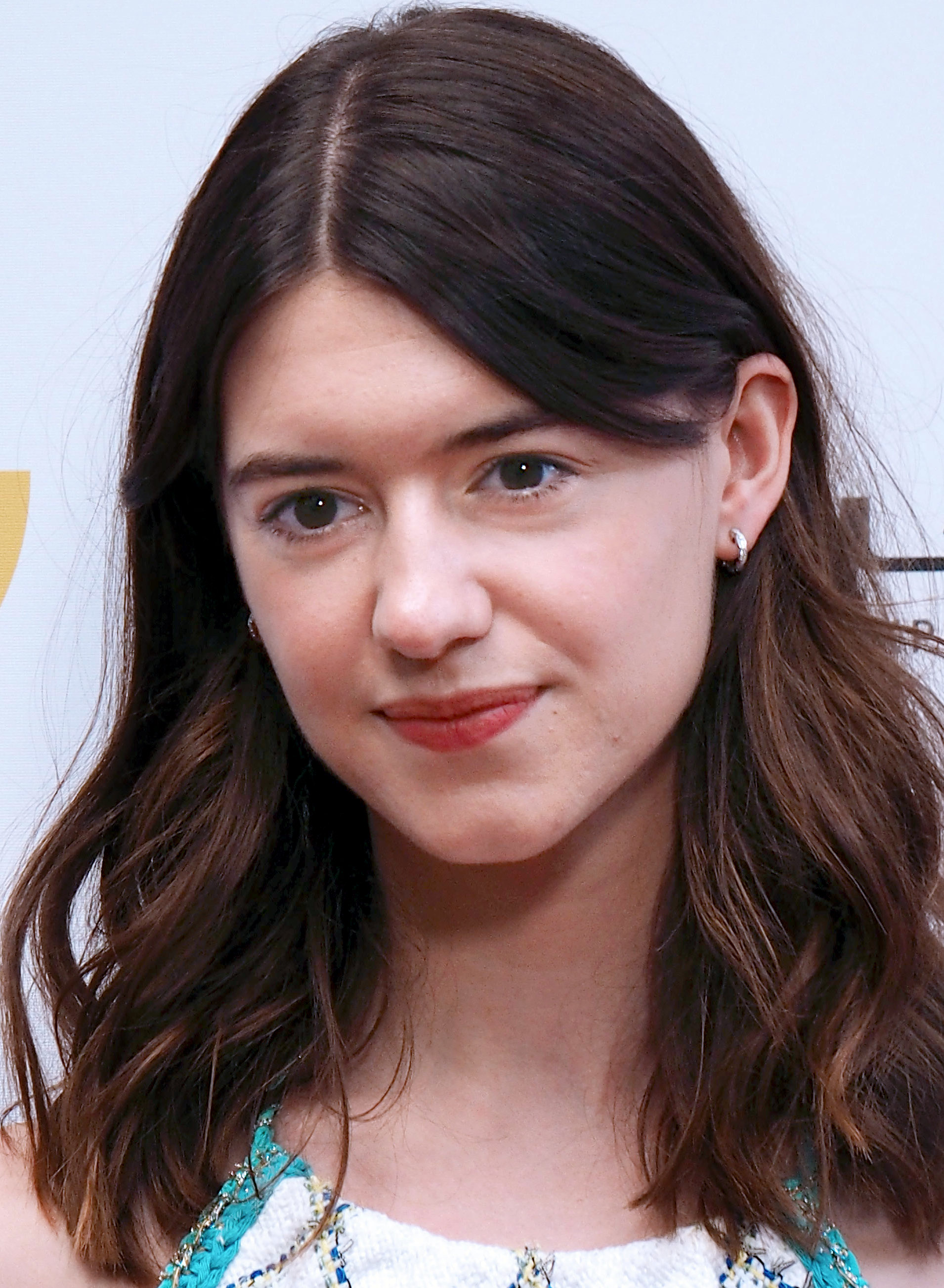
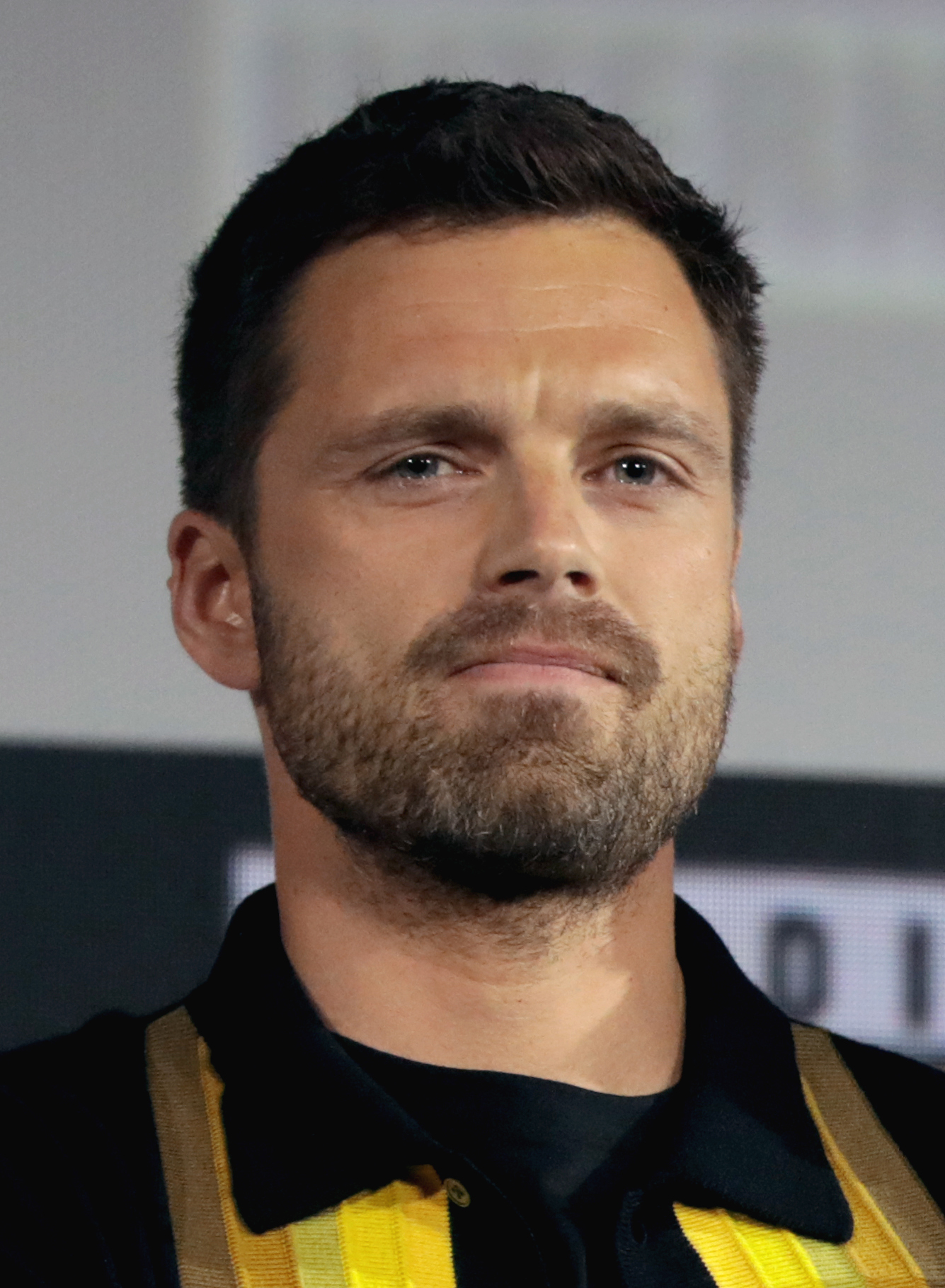
The cast includes Daisy Edgar-Jones (left) as Noa and Sebastian Stan (right) as Steve.
- Daisy Edgar-Jones as Noa
- Sebastian Stan as Steve/Brendan
- Jonica T. Gibbs as Mollie
- Charlotte Le Bon as Ann
- Andrea Bang as Penny
- Dayo Okeniyi as Paul
- Brett Dier as Chad

== Production ==
Screenwriter Lauryn Kahn, a fan of the horror genre growing up, said she wanted to write a film that would appeal to people who were horror fans and people who were not. In July 2020, it was reported Mimi Cave would direct the film in her directorial debut, for Legendary Pictures, with Adam McKay producing under his Hyperobject Industries banner. To play the antagonist, Sebastian Stan sent Cave an audition video featuring himself dancing with a knife in hand. He added: "The dance sequences were a big concern for [Cave] and just in case she had any doubts that I could do it, I recorded myself in this video." Between September and December 2020, Daisy Edgar-Jones, Stan, and Jonica T. Gibbs were announced to star. Principal photography took place from February 3 to March 17, 2021, in British Columbia, Canada. Alex Somers composed the score.

== Release ==
The film premiered online at the Sundance Film Festival on January 20, 2022. Ahead of its premiere, Searchlight Pictures acquired the film's worldwide distribution rights. An in-person premiere was held on March 3, 2022, inside Hollywood Legion Post 43 on Highland Avenue. Instead of an afterparty, the premiere had a pre-screening reception due to the film's subject matter. Gina Wade Creative created a display for the reception featuring a large table with food on it, cleavers hanging on a wall, glass jars filled with raw meat, and boxes of snacks shaped like body parts. Fresh was released on Hulu in the United States on March 4, 2022, with a Latin American premiere on Star+ and a Disney+ release in all other territories on the same date via the Star content hub. The film was released on March 18, 2022, in the United Kingdom and Ireland, after being pushed back a few weeks.

== Reception ==
=== Critical response ===
On the review aggregator website Rotten Tomatoes, 82% of 208 critics' reviews are positive, with an average rating of 7.1/10. The website's consensus reads: "As gripping as it is upsetting, Fresh makes a provocative meal out of the horror of modern dating." Metacritic, which uses a weighted average, assigned the film a score of 67 out of 100, based on 34 critics, indicating "generally favorable" reviews.

Angela Tricarico of Business Insider found the portrayal of modern dating across the horror genre authentic and realistic while complimenting the chemistry of Daisy Edgar-Jones and Sebastian Stan. William Bibbiani of TheWrap praised the chemistry between Jones and Stan through the film, and claimed that Mimi Cave and Pawel Pogorzelski successfully manage to provide a horror movie that balances romance and gore. Sarah-Tai Black of Los Angeles Times stated that the movie takes a fresh approach to the horror genre through its handle of horror and comedy elements, and praised the performance of Stan.

Tara Brady of The Irish Times rated the film four out of five stars, complimented the performance of the cast, and reviewed positively the feminist approach of the movie across the mental trust and friendship provided between the female characters. Tomris Laffly of RogerEbert.com rated the film three out of four stars and declared that Cave and Pogorzelski skillfully create a satirical movie through its use of humor and gore, while acclaiming the performances of Jones and Stan.

=== Viewership ===
According to Whip Media's TV Time, Fresh was the second most streamed movie across all platforms in the United States, during the week of March 4 to March 6, 2022, and the sixth during the week of March 11 to March 13, 2022. According to the streaming aggregator Reelgood, Fresh was the sixth most watched program across all platforms during the week of March 24, 2022.

=== Accolades ===
Year	Award	Category	Nominee(s) and recipient(s)	Result	Ref.
2022	Hollywood Critics Association Midseason Film Awards	Best Actor	Sebastian Stan	Nominated	
2022	Hollywood Critics Association Midseason Film Awards	Best Actress	Daisy Edgar-Jones	Nominated	
2022	Hollywood Critics Association Midseason Film Awards	Best Horror	Fresh	Won	
2022	Hollywood Critics Association TV Awards	Best Streaming Movie	Fresh	Nominated	
2022	Hollywood Critics Association TV Awards	Best Actor in a Streaming Limited or Anthology Series or Movie	Sebastian Stan	Nominated	
2022	Hollywood Critics Association TV Awards	Best Actress in a Streaming Limited or Anthology Series or Movie	Daisy Edgar-Jones	Nominated	
2022	Hollywood Critics Association TV Awards	Best Directing in a Streaming Limited or Anthology Series or Movie	Mimi Cave	Nominated	
2022	Hollywood Critics Association TV Awards	Best Writing in a Streaming Limited or Anthology Series or Movie	Lauryn Kahn	Nominated	
2023	Critics' Choice Awards	Best TV Movie	Fresh	Nominated	
2023	Satellite Awards	Best Television Film	Fresh	Nominated	

== See also ==
- What You Wish For, 2023 American film about culinary human cannibalism.
- Delicious, 2025 German film about human cannibalism.
