= Petite Noir =

Congolese musician

- Also known as: Iamwaves; Noirwaves
- Born: Yannick Diekeno Ilunga; 24 August 1990 (age 35); City of Brussels Belgium
- Origin: Congolese
- Genres: Art rock; art pop; indie; post-punk; R&B; afrobeat; electronic; new wave
- Occupations: Singer; songwriter; musician; record producer
- Instruments: Vocals; piano; guitar; percussion
- Years active: 2009–present
- Labels: Double Six, Roya

Yannick Diekeno Ilunga (born 24 August 1990), known professionally as Petite Noir, is a South African raised, Belgian born, Congolese musician singer, songwriter, musician, and record producer. His debut extended play The King of Anxiety was released in January 2015 and his debut studio album La vie est belle / Life Is Beautiful was released in September of the same year via Domino Records' Double Six Imprint.

== Career ==
=== 2009–12: Popskarr ===
Petite Noir began his musical career in 2009 with record producer Terrence Pearce as the music duo Popskarr. They have released various singles from 2009 to 2012 and have not released any material together since. Noir's debut solo single "Till We Ghosts" was released in 2012 and was later included on his 2015 debut extended play The King of Anxiety. Also in 2012, Noir released the non-album single "Disappear".

=== 2013–14: Early solo career ===
In May 2013, English hip hop recording artist Wretch 32 released a Petite Noir remix of his song "Blackout". Noir released another non-album single called "Noirse" in 2013. In November 2013, a remix of "Noirse" was included on the compilation album Saint Heron. In 2014, Noir released a track called "Chess", which would later be included in both his debut extended play The King of Anxiety and his debut studio album La vie est belle / Life Is Beautiful.

=== 2015–present: The King of Anxiety and La vie est belle / Life Is Beautiful ===
On 19 January 2015, Petite Noir released his debut extended play The King of Anxiety. Pitchfork Media praised the EP as "seamless, subtle and lithe and luminously sexy". It was supported by two singles, "Till We Ghosts" and "Chess".

On 11 September 2015, he released his debut studio album, La vie est belle / Life Is Beautiful It scored a 79 on aggregate review website Metacritic. It was supported by four singles, "Chess", "Down", "Best", and "MDR". In 2015 and 2016, Noir performed live with artists Mac Demarco, Vince Staples, Kendrick Lamar, Killer Mike, and El-P, among others.

In September 2016, Noir was featured on American hip hop recording artist Danny Brown's fourth studio album Atrocity Exhibition on track "Rolling Stone". It was officially released on 27 September, but played on Zane Lowe's Beats 1 radio show on 15 September.

=== 2018 - La Maison Noir / The Black House ===
A new track entitled Blame Fire was released in July 2018, ahead of a new album La Maison Noir / The Black House due out on 5 October on Roya records (part of the WARP records group). The new release will be a six track mini-album featuring guest appearances from Danny Brown and Saul Williams.

== Discography ==
=== Studio albums ===
List of studio albums, with year released
Title	Album details
La vie est belle / Life Is Beautiful	Released: 11 September 2015; Label: Double Six Records; Format: Digital download, CD, vinyl
MotherFather	Released: 14 April 2023; Label: Roya Records; Format: Digital download, CD, LP

=== Mini-albums ===
List of mini-albums, with year released
Title	Album details
La Maison Noir / The Black House	Released: 5 October 2018; Label: ROYA; Format: Digital download, vinyl

=== EPs ===
List of extended plays, with year released
Title	Album details
The King of Anxiety	Released: 19 January 2015; Label: Double Six; Format: Digital download, CD, vinyl

=== Singles ===
==== As lead artist ====
List of singles as lead artist, with showing year released and album name
Title	Year	Album
"Till We Ghosts"	2012	The King of Anxiety
"Disappear"	2012	non-album singles
"Noirse"	2013	non-album singles
"Chess"	2014	The King of Anxiety
"Chess"	2014	La vie est belle / Life Is Beautiful
"Down"	2015	La vie est belle / Life Is Beautiful
"Best"	2015	La vie est belle / Life Is Beautiful
"MDR"	2015	La vie est belle / Life Is Beautiful

=== Guest appearances ===
List of non-single guest appearances, with other performing artists, showing year released and album name
Title	Year	Artist(s)	Album
"Blackout" (Petite Noir Remix)	2013	—N/a	—N/a
"Noirse" (Pional Remix)	2013	—N/a	Saint Heron
"Lost in London"	2015	The Shoes	Chemicals
"Capture"	2015	Baloji, Muanza	64 Bits and Malachite
"Night Time" (Petite Noir Remix)	2015	The fin.	Night Time
"Rolling Stone"	2016	Danny Brown	Atrocity Exhibition
"Swnerve"	2017	Cid Rim	Material
