= Mr. Crocket =

2024 film by Brandon Espy

- Release poster
- Directed by: Brandon Espy
- Screenplay by: Brandon Espy; Carl Reid
- Based on: Mr. Crocket by Brandon Epsy
- Produced by: David Brooks; Jenna Cavelle; Josh Feldman; Jesse Ford; Sean King O'Grady; Arbi Pedrossian; Carl Reid
- Starring: Elvis Nolasco; Jerrika Hinton; Ayden Gavin; Kristolyn Lloyd; Alex Alomar Akpobome
- Cinematography: Powell Robinson
- Edited by: Alex Familian
- Music by: Alex Winkler
- Production companies: Hulu Originals; WorthenBrooks
- Distributed by: Hulu (United States); Disney+ (international)
- Release date: October 11, 2024
- Running time: 88 minutes
- Country: United States
- Language: English

Mr. Crocket is a 2024 American supernatural horror film directed by Brandon Espy in his feature directorial debut from a screenplay he co-wrote with Carl Reid. Based on Espy's 2022 short film of the same name, the film stars Elvis Nolasco as the title character, with Jerrika Hinton, Ayden Gavin, Kristolyn Lloyd, and Alex Akpobome in supporting roles. It follows a mother who embarks on a quest to rescue her son from a demonic children's television series host who is kidnapping children.

The film was first announced in July 2024 as a full-length version of Epsy's original short that he directed for Hulu's Bite Size Halloween series. Nolasco and Hinton were attached to star in the film, with Nolasco also acting as associate producer.

Mr. Crocket premiered at Fantastic Fest on September 26, 2024, and was released by WorthenBrooks as a Hulu original film in the United States and on Disney+ internationally on October 11. It received mixed-to-positive reviews from critics.

== Plot ==
In 1993, young Darren Harper becomes obsessed with Mr. Crocket's World, a children's television series hosted by the titular Mr. Crocket and his puppets Boogaloo Blue and Squawky Bird. During dinner, Darren's stepfather Kevin verbally abuses him until Mr. Crocket emerges from the television. He kills Kevin and disappears with Darren, leaving his mother, Rhonda, horrified.

One year later, Summer Beverly struggles to manage her disobedient son Major in the wake of her husband Jerrel's death. Rhonda, now a homeless woman, warns Summer about Mr. Crocket. Summer finds a Mr. Crocket's World VHS tape in a free library outside her home and gives it to Major, who quickly becomes obsessed with the show. Meanwhile, Mr. Crocket kills a drug addict, Bill, and kidnaps his daughter, Carey, while she is watching the same tape.

One day, as Summer tries convincing Major to go outside, Major throws a tantrum. Summer snaps at him about wanting to quit as his mother and sends him to his room as a punishment for disobeying her. That night, Mr. Crocket emerges from the television and takes Major with him through a portal created with his magic marker. Summer learns about Bill's death and connects Carey's kidnapping to Major's. She researches Mr. Crocket and learns that his full name is Emanuel Crocket, a local children's show host who was killed in a police shootout after he had allegedly kidnapped young Anthony Williams in 1979.

Summer meets Eddie Briggs, a man who believes in her story after Mr. Crocket kidnapped his daughter a few months ago. They realize that Rhonda might know about Mr. Crocket's next abduction and track her to an encampment surrounded by televisions. Rhonda reveals that Mr. Crocket's powers are tied to airwaves and she has telekinetically tapped into them to locate where he will be. The trio confronts Mr. Crocket and he proceeds to attack them, stabbing Rhonda while Summer and Eddie enter through his portal to a nightmarish version of the Mr. Crocket's World set where Major, Darren, Carey, and several other children are under his control.

While monstrous versions of Boogaloo Blue and Squawky Bird restrain Summer, Mr. Crocket recounts how he killed his abusive father and made it look like an accident. Motivated to help other neglected children, Mr. Crocket grew up as a children's entertainer and created his show. During a taping, he met Anthony and realized he had suffered abuse. Mr. Crocket took him to his house, but police officers considered it a kidnapping, resulting in the confrontation that killed him. After dying, Mr. Crocket made a deal with the Devil to deliver the souls of abusive parents in exchange for coming back to life with supernatural powers to protect children, a place to call his own and have the abused children he "saved" become his new family for all eternity.

Eddie reveals that he is actually Anthony and has been manipulating Summer to get back with Mr. Crocket. However, Mr. Crocket rejects him because he is no longer a child and has done nothing with his life other than obsess over rejoining Mr. Crocket. He orders Boogaloo Blue to maul Eddie to death. Mr. Crocket allows Major to decide between him or Summer, to which Major chooses Mr. Crocket and is given a knife to kill his mother. When Summer expresses her love for Major, he secretly steals the magical marker from Mr. Crocket and Summer uses it to slice Mr. Crocket in half. She exits with Major and the other children to the real world as Mr. Crocket vows revenge while telling Major he will always be watching him and will go to his side should he ever call on him.

A still-alive Rhonda reunites with Darren while Summer's relationship with Major improves as both resume their normal lives. Sometime later, Summer learns that Major's aggressive behavior is growing and children at his school are afraid of stories about his new "father". As Summer realizes that Mr. Crocket's influence is still present, Major pulls out the magical marker.

== Cast ==
- Elvis Nolasco as Mr. Emanuel Crocket
- Jerrika Hinton as Summer Beverly
- Ayden Gavin as Major Beverly
- Kristolyn Lloyd as Rhonda Harper
- Alex Alomar Akpobome as Eddie Briggs / Anthony Williams
- Jabari Striblin as Darren Harper
- Alex Morf as Bill
- Riley Vinson as Carey
- Akim Black as Kevin
- Jermaine Rivers as Jerrel Beverly

== Production ==
=== Casting ===
In July 2024, it was announced that Elvis Nolasco and Jerrika Hinton would star in the film, with Nolasco also acting as associate producer. Nolasco was chosen because of the actor's desire to play the role; the actor remained in character throughout filming and introduced himself to the cast and crew as Mr. Crocket.

=== Production and development ===
Espy came up with the concept for Mr. Crocket after seeing his eldest son obsessively watch the television show Blippi, wondering what it would be like if the character came out of the television set. He also drew inspiration from Mister Rogers' Neighborhood, Pee-wee's Playhouse, and A Nightmare on Elm Street. Espy turned the concept into the 2022 short film of the same name for Hulu's Bite Size Halloween, later developing it into a full feature length film. Per cinematographer Powell Robinson, Espy wanted the film to have the tone of an "80s style horror movie, but it happens to be set in the 90s", recommending that he view Menace II Society and Juice, along with one of the A Nightmare on Elm Street films. The crew chose to use more practical effects as opposed to visual effects, as they felt that it would better allow the film to keep a '90s feel and that the horror audience would appreciate this.

Filming took place during summer 2024; Hinton and Nolasco completed their scenes in July 2024.

=== Release ===
The film's first trailer was released on September 18, 2024, less than a month before its release, alongside exclusive first look images from the film. Mr. Crocket premiered at Fantastic Fest on September 26, 2024, and was released by WorthenBrooks as a Hulu original film in the United States and on Disney+ internationally on October 11.

The short film upon which Mr. Crocket was based was first released in 2022 as part of Hulu's Bite Size Halloween program. It was later also screened at Screamfest on October 14, 2023.

== Reception ==
=== Critical response ===
On the review aggregator website Rotten Tomatoes, 68% of 22 critics' reviews are positive.

The film received mixed to positive reviews upon its release. Karina Adelgaard of Heaven of Horror highlighted the film’s "gorgeous practical effects," noting they "worked exactly as intended." However, she found the film "very predictable," and Dempsey Pillot of The DisInsider described it as "conflicting." He praised Espy's direction and the well-developed characters but remarked that the film draws heavily on familiar tropes from other works.

Tyler Nichols of JoBlo.com noted, "Jerrika Hinton delivers a solid performance, but her character can be a bit frustrating. Her treatment of her child and actions that enable Crocket to take him make it difficult to find her sympathetic. However, I didn’t mind this aspect, as the film made it enjoyable to root for the villain." He also expressed disappointment that some of the creative elements weren't fully explored throughout the film's entire runtime. Matthew Donato of Collider rated Mr. Crocket 6 out of 10, describing it as a "decent all-ages thriller" that leans into its adults-only rating. He wrote that while director Espy "succeeds better than expected in his debut expansion on an existing concept," he struggles with stretching a short-form idea to feature length. However, Donato concluded that the film's practical effects and fast pacing help balance its thinner storytelling.

== Possible sequel ==
Espy has expressed interest in creating a sequel, stating that "Crocket, he's immortal."
