= Alex Akpobome =

American actor

Alex Akpobome is an American actor, known for his work on the TV shows Industry and Based on a True Story.

== Early life and education ==
Akpobome was raised by a single mother in Glendale and Los Feliz. He is an only child. During his teenage years he attended boarding school in Oregon, was homeschooled in high school and briefly attended Los Angeles City College. In 2013, he enrolled in the London Academy of Music and Dramatic Arts on the 3 years Bachelor course graduating in 2016.

== Career ==
After completing drama school and starring in a series of short films in 2020 Akpobome was cast as a leading role in Lena Waithe's Twenties. He also recurred on Apple’s “For All Mankind”.

In 2022, he joined the second season of Industry as series regular Danny “DVD” Van Deventer and following that as Kaley Cuoco’s potential love interest in the first season of Based on a True Story.

== Personal life ==
Akpobome was born and raised in Los Angeles and is a recreational skateboarder.

== Filmography ==
| Year | Title | Role | Notes |
|---|---|---|---|
| 2020–2021 | Twenties | Ben Okwu | 15 episodes |
| 2021 | For All Mankind | Paul DeWeese | 3 episodes |
| 2022 | Industry | Daniel Van Deventer | 8 episodes |
| 2023 | Based on a True Story | Ryan | 4 episodes |
| 2024 | Mr. Crocket | Eddie | |
| TBA | Pumping Black † | | Filming |
