= Atrocity Exhibition (album) =

Studio album by Danny Brown
- Released: September 27, 2016
- Recorded: 2014–2016
- Studios: Copper Top (Michigan); Red Bull (London)
- Genre: Progressive rap
- Length: 46:38
- Labels: Fool's Gold; Warp
- Producers: The Alchemist; Black Milk; Evian Christ; Paul White; Petite Noir; Playa Haze

Danny Brown chronology
Old (2013)	Atrocity Exhibition (2016)	UKnoWhatImSayin? (2019)

Singles from Atrocity Exhibition
- 1. "When It Rain" Released: June 14, 2016; 2. "Pneumonia" Released: August 19, 2016; 3. "Really Doe" Released: September 20, 2016; 4. "Ain't It Funny" Released: April 22, 2017

Atrocity Exhibition is the third studio album by American rapper Danny Brown. It was released on September 27, 2016, by Fool's Gold Records and Warp Records. It is primarily produced by English producer Paul White, and features guest appearances from Kendrick Lamar, Ab-Soul, Earl Sweatshirt, B-Real, Kelela, and Petite Noir.

Atrocity Exhibition was supported by pre-release singles "When It Rain", "Pneumonia", and "Really Doe", with "Ain't It Funny" being released as a single after the album's release. The album received widespread acclaim from critics, appearing on the year-end lists of many publications.

== Artwork ==
The artwork for Atrocity Exhibition was created by Timothy Saccenti. It features a databent image of Danny Brown, who appears to have his skin peeled to bone on his right side.

== Release and promotion ==
On October 28, 2014, Danny Brown announced that he was working on a new album. On April 25, 2015, when asked if his album was done, Brown responded: "Almost, I took a break from it cause I'm so ahead of schedule with it knowing it ain't coming out no time soon."

On June 14, Brown announced that he had signed a deal to Warp Records. On July 17, Brown stated that his new album would be titled Atrocity Exhibition, taking inspiration from both the Joy Division song of the same name and J. G. Ballard's novel of the same name. On August 16, Brown unveiled the album's track-listing and release date. On September 15, Brown was interviewed by NPR Music. He spoke on the creation process of the album and premiered a song, titled "Rolling Stone". On September 21, Brown debuted the track, called "Tell Me What I Don't Know" during his interview on Zane Lowe's Beats 1 radio show. From September 14 to November 5, 2016, Brown embarked on The Exhibition 2016 Tour with special guests Maxo Kream and Zelooperz. On September 27, Brown released the album three days ahead of its schedule at 3:00 p.m. EST. A sitcom-themed music video for "Ain't It Funny" directed by Jonah Hill was released on March 28, 2017.

In support of the album's tenth anniversary, Brown announced a four show tour and an expanded reissue of the album with instrumental versions of the album's songs.

=== Singles ===
The album's lead single, "When It Rain", was released on June 14, 2016, alongside its music video. The song was produced by Paul White. The album's second single, "Pneumonia", was released on August 19, 2016, the song features background vocals from Schoolboy Q and production from Evian Christ. A music video for "Pneumonia" was released on October 13, 2016.

On September 19, 2016, Peter Rosenberg of New York City-based radio station Hot 97, premiered a new Danny Brown song, titled "Really Doe", after given permission from Brown. The track features vocals from Kendrick Lamar, Ab-Soul and Earl Sweatshirt, with the production that was handled by Brown's longtime collaborator Black Milk. "Really Doe" was later released as the album's third and final single via digital distribution on September 20. In an interview, Brown revealed that Lamar was responsible for the creation of "Really Doe".

== Critical reception ==
Professional ratings
Aggregate scores
Source	Rating
AnyDecentMusic?	8.1/10
Metacritic	85/100
Review scores
Source	Rating
AllMusic	5/5 stars
The Guardian	5/5 stars
The Independent	3/5 stars
Mojo	4/5 stars
The Observer	4/5 stars
Pitchfork	8.5/10
Q	4/5 stars
Rolling Stone	4/5 stars
Uncut	8/10
Vice	B+

Atrocity Exhibition was met with widespread critical acclaim. At Metacritic, which assigns a normalized rating out of 100 to reviews from professional publications, the album received an average score of 85, based on 31 reviews. Aggregator AnyDecentMusic? gave it 8.1 out of 10, based on their assessment of the critical consensus.

David Jeffries of AllMusic said, "Atrocity Exhibition is Danny Brown at his least diluted, almost unrelentingly grim and completely engrossing". Hugh Leask of Clash said, "Yet beyond this wired mix of post-punk anxiety, splintered techno elements and haunting soul samples, it's Danny Brown's rhyming ability that ultimately sees the LP flourish". A. Harmony of Exclaim! said, "Overall, Atrocity Exhibition is chewy and eclectic, a rich experience that reveals a new surprise with each listen. Years from now, there will still be goodies to unpack". Ben Beaumont-Thomas of The Guardian said, "His voice, agitatedly squawking and yet dainty as a ballerina, is one of contemporary music's greatest pleasures. He quotes Outkast's "B.O.B" on Today, and is the true successor to their trailblazing spirit". Kevin Ritchie of Now said, "Thematically he might travel into dark and desperate places, but the idea that one can find salvation in music is made vividly real by the rush of energy that is Atrocity Exhibition". Damien Morris of The Observer said, "Normally you'd change carriages to avoid someone sounding this unhinged, but the 15 dosages Brown dispenses here are worryingly addictive". Matthew Ramirez of Pitchfork said, "Atrocity Exhibition finds Brown back behind the lens, capturing raw emotion with grainy 16mm". Emmanuel Elone of PopMatters said, "As an album, it is both as lovably outrageous as Danny Brown, but also as menacing and impenetrable as his city is. Ultimately, it is this duality that makes Atrocity Exhibition the masterpiece it is". Sheldon Pearce of Spin said, "With help from frequent collaborators Paul White and Black Milk, UK electronic producer Evian Christ, and crate-digging maestro The Alchemist, Brown brings his persistent terrors to life". Steve Yates of Q stated, "The oddball rapper with the humdrum name is carving out a space all of his own". Andy Baber of MusicOMH said, "The whole of Atrocity Exhibition takes Brown's craft to a new level, even if his delivery occasionally grates. It's by far the best thing he's released and confirms his arrival among the rap elite".

Christopher Weingarten of Rolling Stone said, "The fourth album from Detroit's Danny Brown is the year's most thrilling cry for help". Bryce Jones of Slant Magazine said, "The music is dementedly, nihilistically danceable. The propulsion of certain tracks seems designed to irrevocably drag the listener into Brown's contemplative, paranoid psyche and deep-welled emotionality and, though stylized, intimates the horrors he's seen and felt". Scott Glaysher of XXL said, "At times, he comes across as brilliantly unorthodox with flows, genre-crossing beats and meticulously honest lyrics but those unfamiliar with his outré style may be pushed even further away from the album's peculiarity". Nick Hasted of The Independent said, "This fourth album is produced by south London's Paul White, and a shared taste for Talking Heads and especially Joy Division (the LP is named after their song, more than J. G. Ballard's novel) takes it way off the mainstream hip-hop map".

=== Rankings ===
Select rankings of Atrocity Exhibition
Publication	List	Rank	Ref.
Complex	The 50 Best Albums of 2016	12	
Consequence	Top 50 Albums of 2016	25	
The Guardian	The 40 Best Albums of 2016	13	
NME	Top 50 Albums of 2016	16	
Paste	Top 50 Albums of 2016	21	
Paste	The 300 Greatest Albums of All Time	237	
Pitchfork	Top 50 Albums of 2016	11	
Rolling Stone	Top 50 Albums of 2016	19	
The Skinny	Top 50 Albums of 2016	30	
Spin	Top 50 Albums of 2016	16	
Stereogum	Top 50 Albums of 2016	10	

=== Industry awards ===
Awards and nominations for Atrocity Exhibition
Year	Ceremony	Category	Result	Ref.
2016	Independent Music Companies Association	European Independent Album of the Year	Shortlisted	

== Commercial performance ==
Atrocity Exhibition debuted at number 77 on the US Billboard 200, with 7,000 equivalent album units and nearly three million streams, in an abbreviated week.

== Track listing ==
All tracks produced by Paul White, except where noted.

Atrocity Exhibition track listing
No.	Title	Writer(s)	Producer(s)	Length
1.	"Downward Spiral"	Daniel Sewell; Paul Williams White; Alex Genrich; Mani Neumeier; Ulrich Trepte		2:52
2.	"Tell Me What I Don't Know"	Sewell; White		2:31
3.	"Rolling Stone" (featuring Petite Noir)	Sewell; Yannick Ilunga	Petite Noir	3:47
4.	"Really Doe" (featuring Kendrick Lamar, Ab-Soul and Earl Sweatshirt)	Sewell; Herbert Stevens IV; Kendrick Duckworth; Thebe Kgositsile; Curtis Cross; Giovanni Cristiani	Black Milk	5:19
5.	"Lost"	Sewell; Deven Welch; Chen Gexin; Tao Qin	Playa Haze	2:07
6.	"Ain't It Funny"	Sewell; White		2:57
7.	"Golddust"	Sewell; White		2:24
8.	"White Lines"	Sewell; Alan Maman; Dave Greenslade	The Alchemist	2:23
9.	"Pneumonia"	Sewell; Joshua Leary; Raz Mesinai	Evian Christ	3:39
10.	"Dance in the Water"	Sewell; White; Kim Davis; Min Sanchez; Dany Johnson; Ande Whyland; April Palmeri; Stacey Elkin; Lori Montana; Jean Leider; Ann Magnusen; Wendy Wild		2:37
11.	"From the Ground" (featuring Kelela)	Sewell; White; Kelela Mizanekristos; Laurence Creme; Kevin Godley		2:18
12.	"When It Rain"	Sewell; White; Delia Ann Derbyshire		3:15
13.	"Today"	Sewell; White		3:07
14.	"Get Hi" (featuring B-Real)	Sewell; Louis Freese; White		3:33
15.	"Hell for It"	Sewell; White		3:49
Total length:				46:38

Sample credits

- "Downward Spiral" contains elements from "Oxymoron", written by Alex Genrich, Mani Neumeier and Ulrich Trepte and performed by Guru Guru.
- "Really Doe" contains elements from "Fragments of Crystal", written and performed by Giovanni Cristiani.
- "Lost" contains elements from "Flame of Love" (Chinese: 戀之火), written by Chen Gexin and Tao Qin and performed by Bai Guang.
- "Ain't It Funny" contains elements from "Wervin'", performed by Nick Mason.
- "Golddust" contains elements from "People From Out the Space", performed by Embryo.
- "White Lines" contains elements from "Dry Land", written and performed by Dave Greenslade.
- "Pneumonia" contains elements from "Black Mamba", performed by Cut Hands; and "White Room", written and performed by Raz Mesinai.
- "Dance in the Water" contains elements from "Ungawa Part II (Way Out Guyana)", written by Kim Davis, Min Sanchez, Dany Johnson, Ande Whyland, April Palmeri, Stacey Elkin, Lori Montana, Jean Leider, Ann Magnusen and Wendy Wild and performed by Pulsallama.
- "From the Ground" contains elements from "Sleeping Earth", written and performed by Lol Creme and Kevin Godley.
- "When It Rain" contains elements from "Pot Au Feu", written and performed by Delia Derbyshire.

== Charts ==
Chart performance for Atrocity Exhibition
Chart (2016)	Peak position
Australian Albums (ARIA)	48
Belgian Albums (Ultratop Flanders)	99
Canadian Albums (Billboard)	50
French Albums (SNEP)	161
New Zealand Heatseekers Albums (RMNZ)	7
US Billboard 200	77
US Top R&B/Hip-Hop Albums (Billboard)	5
