= Ain't It Funny (Danny Brown song) =

- Picture disc illustration

Single by Danny Brown

from the album Atrocity Exhibition
- B-side: "Worth It"
- Released: April 22, 2017
- Recorded: 2015
- Genre: Experimental hip hop
- Length: 2:57
- Label: Warp
- Songwriters: Daniel Sewell; Paul White
- Producer: Paul White

Danny Brown singles chronology
"Really Doe" (2016)	"Ain't It Funny" (2017)	"Kool Aid" (2017)

Music video
- Music video on YouTube

"Ain't It Funny" is a song by American rapper Danny Brown. The song was initially released by Warp Records on September 27, 2016 as the sixth track on his third studio album Atrocity Exhibition, and was later released on a limited edition picture disc on April 22, 2017 as the fourth and final single from the album. The song has received widespread critical acclaim, with many critics listing it as the best song on the album, and retrospectively of Brown's career.

== Composition ==
"Ain't It Funny" is an experimental hip hop song lasting two minutes and fifty seven seconds at a tempo of 114 beats per minute. The song's instrumental contains atonal saxophones and a rhythm inspired by no wave, while Brown "raps like he's running out of air" according to Matt McDermott of Resident Advisor. Yoh Burgundy of DJBooth felt that "This beat is a monster, [...] it sounds like it took bath salts. It will probably eat your face if you saw it on the wrong street corner." Son Raw of Passion of the Weiss described the song as going "full glam", while Jacob Nierenburg of Stanford Daily wrote that the song "sounds like Brown is backed by a marching band from hell". "Ain't It Funny" contains samples of the song "Wervin'" by Pink Floyd drummer Nick Mason.

== Music video ==
A music video directed by actor Jonah Hill was premiered on March 28, 2017, starring Brown as well as Gus Van Sant, Joanna Kerns, Lauren Alice Avery, and Jason Maybaum; the latter is credited as "This Fucking Kid". The video parodies early 90s family sitcoms, starring a stereotypical sitcom family with Brown, who plays a fictionalized version of himself named "Uncle Danny". Uncle Danny struggles with addiction, but his family and the studio audience laugh at him. At the end of the video, a personified cough syrup bottle and Xanax tablet stab and kill Uncle Danny while the audience continues to laugh. Michael Nordine of IndieWire compared the video to Full House, describing it as similar to a "bizarre, would-be wholesome sitcom" world. Jordan Raup of The Film Stage stated that Hill was "testing out his skills in capturing the [mid-90's] time period" in relation to his then-upcoming directorial debut Mid90s, while Rap-Up's Andres instead compared it to late '80s sitcoms. In 2023, Rolling Stone Australia would rank the music video as the 80th greatest hip hop video of all time.

== Critical reception ==
"Ain't It Funny" received critical acclaim from contemporary music critics. Lawrence Burney of Vice praised the song as the album's "most transparent track" where "All of [the album's] sentiments come full circle", stating it proved Brown as a "master at dressing up cries for help with mind-twisting production and crazed vocal inflections that can distract from the point, a musical expression of the lived impulse to deal with his problem by further submerging himself in it". Chet Betz of Killscreen described the album as Atrocity Exhibition's "simultaneous peak and valley". Hip-Hop Golden Age retrospectively listed the song as Brown's best in their ranking of his top 15 best songs in 2025, writing "Through its aggressive sound, raw lyricism, and self-immolating visuals, the track refuses comfort, demanding the listener confront what they’re really engaging with when they press play."

== Track listing ==
10" picture disc

No.	Title	Length
1.	"Ain't It Funny"	2:57
2.	"Ain't It Funny" (Acapella)	2:37
3.	"Worth It" (with Clams Casino)	2:49
4.	"Ain't It Funny" (Instrumental)	2:57
