= Nichole Sakura =

American actress

- Other names: Nichole Bloom; Nichole O'Connor
- Education: University of Southern California (BFA)
- Occupation: Actress
- Years active: 2010–present

Nichole Sakura O'Connor (formerly credited as Nichole Bloom) is an American actress best known for her roles as Cheyenne Tyler Lee in the NBC sitcom Superstore (2015–2021), Amanda in Shameless (2014–2016), and as Emily Davis in the horror video game Until Dawn.

== Early life ==
Sakura was born to a Japanese mother and an American father with Irish ancestry. She was raised in San Francisco and usually spent her summers as a child visiting relatives in Japan. She went to Santa Susana High School in Simi Valley and later attended the University of Southern California, from which she graduated after three years as a theater major. After college, Sakura briefly attended classes at The Groundlings Theatre but was cut from the program, which she considered "devastating".

== Career ==
She had the recurring role of Amanda on Shameless from 2014 to 2016.

In 2015, Sakura starred in the music video for one of Phantoms's two singles, "Broken Halo", from their EP of the same name. Later that year, she was added to the main cast of the NBC sitcom Superstore as Cheyenne, a 17-year-old store employee who is pregnant at the start of the series. The series followed a group of employees working at Cloud 9, a fictional big-box chain store in St. Louis, Missouri.

She had voice roles in numerous animated film and television series, including Suzume, OK K.O.! Let's Be Heroes, Kiff, and Central Park. In 2023, she had a recurring role as a ghost named Jessica on the CBS sitcom Ghosts. In November of that year, Sakura starred alongside the troupe Please Don't Destroy in the comedy film Please Don't Destroy: The Treasure of Foggy Mountain, directed by Paul Briganti and written by the former group.

== Personal life ==
Her stage name was previously Nichole Bloom. The name "Bloom" was chosen as an homage to her middle name, Sakura, the Japanese word for "cherry blossom". In an August 2020 post on Instagram, she announced her decision to change her name to Nichole Sakura. In the same post, Sakura wrote that she had changed her name for her acting credits to honor her mother and her Japanese heritage. She stated that she had adopted the stage name Nichole Bloom out of fear of being typecast into stereotypical Asian roles.

== Filmography ==
=== Film ===
Year	Title	Role	Notes
2010	Everyday	Nichole O'Connor	Short film
2011	Carpool	Rachel	Short film
2012	Project X	JB's Girlfriend	
2012	Model Minority	Kayla Tanaka	
2013	Full Circle	Nichole	Short film
2015	Man Up	Kayla	
2016	Teenage Cocktail	Annie Fenton	Main role
2017	Lazer Team 2	Maggie Wittington	
2023	Suzume	Suzume Iwato	Voice; Main role, English dub
2023	Please Don't Destroy: The Treasure of Foggy Mountain	Amy Murphy	
2024	Micro Budget	Jenny	
2026	Hoppers	Reptile Queens	Voices

=== Television ===
Year	Title	Role	Notes
2014	Teen Wolf	Rinko	2 episodes
2014	Grey's Anatomy	Leanne	1 episode
2014–2016	Shameless	Amanda	Recurring role; 17 episodes
2015–2021	Superstore	Cheyenne Thompson	Main cast; 111 episodes
2017–2019	OK K.O.! Let's Be Heroes	Carla, Pepelina, Nanini, Gecky, Bobo	Voice; 6 episodes
2018–2020	Robot Chicken	Various Characters	Voice; 2 episodes
2020	Where's Waldo?	Wizard Amber	Voice; 1 episode (as Nichole Bloom)
2020	Big Hero 6: The Series	Olivia Mole	Voice; 1 episode
2021–2022	Maggie	Louise	Main cast; 13 episodes
2021	Star Wars: Visions	Haru	Voice; Short film: The Village Bride: English language dub
2022	Beavis and Butt-Head	Girl	Voice; 1 episode
2023	Central Park	(voice)	2 episodes
2023	Ghosts	Jessica	3 episodes
2023–present	Kiff	Terri Buns and Various roles	Voice; 25 episodes
2024	The Finnish Line	Elyse	Television film
2025	Royal-ish	Lacey Pope	Hallmark Channel Movie

=== Video games ===
Year	Title	Role	Notes
2015, 2024	Until Dawn	Emily "Em" Davis	Also performed motion-capture

=== Music videos ===
Year	Song	Artist	Role	Notes
2015	"Broken Halo"	Phantoms		
