= Whack-A-Mole (Poker Face) =

- Poker Face episode
- Episode no.: Season 2 Episode 3
- Directed by: Miguel Arteta
- Written by: Wyatt Cain
- Cinematography by: Jaron Presant
- Editing by: Shaheed Qaasim
- Original air date: May 8, 2025
- Running time: 41 minutes

Guest appearances
- John Mulaney as Agent Daniel Clyde-Otis; Richard Kind as Jeffrey Hasp; Chris Bauer as Special Agent Hooper; Simon Helberg as Agent Luca Clark; Rhea Perlman as Beatrix Hasp; R.J. Brown as Agent Gary Prescott; Gregg Bello as Peter

Episode chronology
← Previous "Last Looks"	Next → "The Taste of Human Blood"

"Whack-A-Mole" is the third episode of the second season of the American murder mystery comedy-drama television series Poker Face. It is the thirteenth overall episode of the series and was written by producer Wyatt Cain, and directed by Miguel Arteta. It was released on Peacock on May 8, 2025.

The series follows Charlie Cale, a woman with the ability to detect if people are lying; after the events of the first season, Charlie is being pursued by hitmen sent by criminal boss Beatrix Hasp. The episode finds Charlie taken hostage by Hasp and forced to help her in escaping the country with her husband.

The episode received highly positive reviews from critics, who praised the humor, guest appearances and closure to Beatrix Hasp's story arc. Some expressed curiosity over the series' future, particularly over its ending.

== Plot ==
One year prior, Charlie (Natasha Lyonne) is contacted by Beatrix Hasp (Rhea Perlman), who swears revenge for causing a war in the criminal underworld. (Note: As depicted in "The Hook".) In present day, Hasp explains that she plans to flee the country by plane, but wants Charlie to root out the mole within her organization first.

Discovering that their safe house is compromised, Hasp has Charlie drive to a motel where she is hiding with her husband Jeffrey (Richard Kind) and three enforcers. Charlie confirms that none of them are moles. Wary of a setup, Hasp takes Charlie to the airstrip and forces her to board the plane first. Charlie finds that the pilot is a dummy, and FBI agents raid the scene, including Luca (Simon Helberg). Jeffrey runs towards the plane and is shot down by Luca; Hasp takes Luca's gun and shoots him in the head. She gets in the plane, blaming Charlie for Jeffrey's death, and shoots at her.

A few weeks prior, the FBI holds a meeting regarding Hasp's whereabouts, where Luca claims he has an informant within her organization. Fellow agent Daniel Clyde-Otis (John Mulaney) is revealed to be working for Hasp, assigned to find the identity of the informant. Daniel meets with Hasp at a gas station, warning her that her safe house is compromised. After Hasp fails to show up at the safe house, Luca meets with his informant: Jeffrey, annoyed that Hasp prioritizes her work over their marriage. Jeffrey is willing to cooperate in exchange for witness protection; he recognizes Daniel as the informant, but tells Luca he will not disclose the name until he is safe. They orchestrate a scheme where Luca will pretend to shoot Jeffrey to fake his death. Daniel watches from another car, with a lip reader detailing the conversation.

At the motel, Charlie realizes that Jeffrey is the mole but lies for him. She contacts Luca, who instructs her to lock herself in the cockpit and to not trust any other FBI agent. Luca loads his gun with blanks, but Daniel replaces one with a real bullet, killing Jeffery but leaving Luca unharmed. When she shoots at Charlie, Hasp realizes the gun is loaded with blanks and deduces that her husband was the mole. When she demands to see him, she is informed of his death. While shaken, she demands a real pilot from the FBI, threatening to reveal the identity of her mole.

Charlie gets Hasp to see that her informant must have been responsible for Jeffery's death, as he threatened to expose him. Luca sneaks onto the plane and promises to protect her if she reveals her mole. Hasp exposes Daniel on a walkie-talkie to the FBI, but he enters with a gun and threatens the trio. Charlie helps Luca gain the upper hand, and Daniel is arrested. For exposing an informant and testifying against the other crime families, Hasp is granted witness protection. She also cancels the hit on Charlie. Charlie is curious over her new "fresh start" without being on the run, and randomly picks a place in her map to decide where to go next.

== Production ==
=== Development ===
The series was announced in March 2021, with Rian Johnson serving as creator, writer, director and executive producer. Johnson stated that the series would delve into "the type of fun, character driven, case-of-the-week mystery goodness I grew up watching." The episode was written by producer Wyatt Cain, and directed by Miguel Arteta. This was Cain's third writing credit, and Arteta's first directing credit for the show.

=== Casting ===
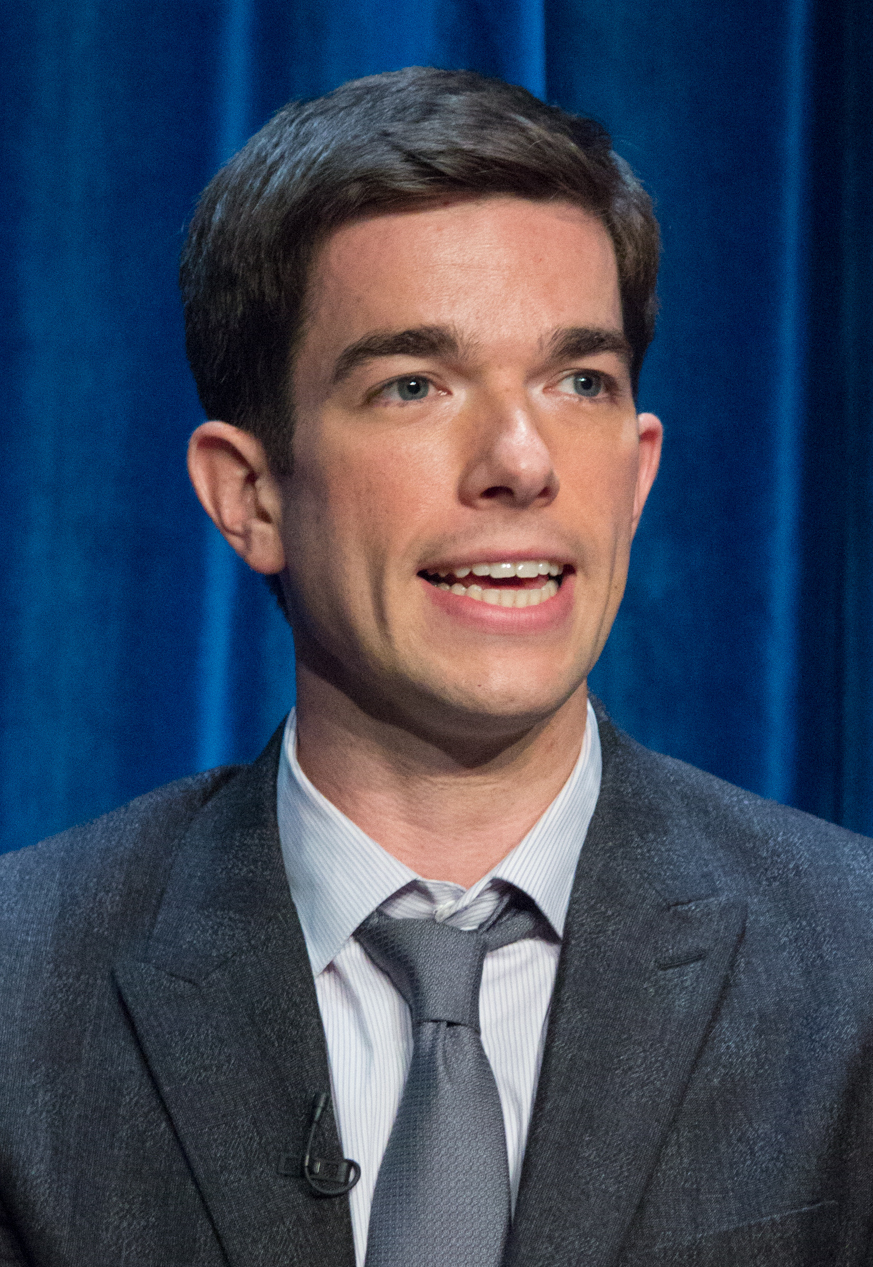
John Mulaney guest stars in the episode.

The announcement of the series included that Natasha Lyonne would serve as the main lead actress. She was approached by Johnson about working on a procedural project together, with Lyonne as the lead character. As Johnson explained, the role was "completely cut to measure for her."

Due to the series' procedural aspects, the episodes feature several guest stars. Johnson was inspired by the amount of actors who guest starred on Columbo, wanting to deem each guest star as the star of the episode, which allowed them to attract many actors. The episode featured a guest appearance by John Mulaney, who was announced to guest star in October 2024. As the crew considered possible guest stars, writer Wyatt Cain said that the character of Daniel Clyde-Otis should be a "John Mulaney type". As Lyonne was friends with Mulaney, they contacted him to see if he would be interested. Mulaney accepted the offer, to the point that he canceled a birthday trip to Hawaii to appear in the series. The episode reunited Mulaney with Richard Kind, after both worked together on John Mulaney Presents: Everybody's in LA, although Kind states that their casting was simply a coincidence.

=== Writing ===
Rian Johnson explained that the writers decided to finish the Hasp story arc as he was worried it would feel repetitive of the first season. He also felt that he "really wanted to define both for the writing staff and also for the audience, bring this back to being an episodic show, and make sure the emphasis is on that." Showrunner Tony Tost added that the resolution "kind of gives us maybe a little bit more breathing space to lightly explore her character and what she's actually looking for in the world and what her life might look like without having necessarily the same kind of ticking clock, or a Big Bad breathing down her neck."

== Critical reception ==
"Whack-A-Mole" received highly positive reviews from critics. Noel Murray of The A.V. Club gave the 3-episode premiere an "A–" grade and wrote, "This brings us to “Whack-A-Mole,” the final episode of this trifecta and in some ways the weakest — though for the most part all three are consistently entertaining. Director Miguel Arteta and screenwriter Wyatt Cain play with the Poker Face formula a little here, beginning right where the last episode left off, with Beatrix holding Charlie hostage. The whole first act is spent with these two, setting up the plot and springing a twist."

Alan Sepinwall wrote, "This one's fascinating as an inverse of the show's formula, where we see how Charlie is involved first, and only after do we find out who the murderer is and how they pulled off what they think is the perfect crime. But it still works, and it's nice to have Simon Helberg back as Luca, whose career keeps soaring on the back of cases that Charlie gift wraps for him." Elisa Guimarães of Collider wrote, "Honestly, after the disappointment that was "Last Looks," it feels nice to be reminded that Poker Face can still deliver the basic bread and butter that actually makes it tick. Writer Wyatt Cain and director Miguel Arteta charm and entertain with a fast-paced, enthralling plot that blindsides everyone, including Charlie herself."

Amanda Whiting of Vulture gave the episode a 3 star rating out of 5 and wrote, "In “Whack-a-Mole,” however, the show tries something different, and while it should be an exciting twist on the format, it ends up falling a little flat. The problem isn't the deviation itself so much as the way it's executed. Thankfully, the high standards of a show as rock solid as this one mean that even a middling installment has plenty to offer." Melody McCune of Telltale TV wrote, "Episode three is fast-paced, intense, and stuffed to the gills with action. “Whack-a-Mole” moves at a steady clip, packing in quite a bit into its tight 40-minute runtime. There are legitimate twists and turns, and, like episode two, you feel like Charlie is in legitimate danger (plot armor aside)."

Ben Sherlock of Screen Rant wrote, "The third episode, “Whack-a-Mole,” deviates drastically from the usual formula but it's just as brilliant as the other episodes (maybe even more so). The opening shootout seems pretty straightforward, but then the episode goes back and introduces a mole, a crooked cop, a couple of secret phone calls, and a planned ruse that make the situation significantly more complicated. Every twist and turn lands in a thrilling standalone showdown that also deftly sets up the premise for the rest of the season." Shay McBryde of Show Snob wrote, "John Mulaney is some all-star casting, but I can't say he makes a convincing FBI agent in this plot. He comes across very unintelligent. I can see why Danny became an informant for the mob because he’s not near as successful as Luca Clark is."
