= Please Don't Destroy =

American comedy troupe

- (l to r:)Ben Marshall, John Higgins, & Martin Herlihy backstage at UCB NYC, in 2021
- Education: New York University

Comedy career
- Years active: 2017–present (as a trio); 2021–2025 (SNL tenure)
- Genres: Sketch comedy, slapstick, off-color humor
- Members: Ben Marshall; John Higgins; Martin Herlihy
- Website: pleasedontdestroy.com

Please Don't Destroy is an American comedy group in New York City composed of Ben Marshall, John Higgins, and Martin Herlihy, who began collaborating as students at New York University. The group was founded in 2017 and based on an act titled Please Don't Destroy My Farm. The troupe performed monthly comedy shows, appeared at the New York Comedy Festival, and produced sketch videos posted to YouTube. During the COVID-19 pandemic, the trio began creating short-form videos for TikTok and Twitter.

In 2021, the trio was hired as writers on Saturday Night Live (SNL) to produce prerecorded digital videos for the show's 47th season. Please Don't Destroy debuted on SNL on October 9, 2021 with the sketch Hard Seltzer. Its song "Three Sad Virgins", with Pete Davidson and Taylor Swift, received widespread attention. In 2023, the group did a 26-date live comedy tour of the United States. In the same year, the trio wrote and starred in Please Don't Destroy: The Treasure of Foggy Mountain, a comedy film that follows three friends as they struggle through early adulthood and search for treasure.

In July 2025, Please Don't Destroy began a comedy tour of seven U.S. cities. In September 2025, it was announced that Higgins would not return for Saturday Night Live's 51st season, while Herlihy would remain as a writer and Marshall would be promoted to cast member. Herlihy continued to appear in prerecorded sketches written and directed by him during the season. However, a year later in September 2026, it was announced that Herlihy would also depart from SNL ahead of its 52nd season, leaving Marshall as the only member of the trio to remain on the show. Please Don't Destroy has stated that they would not break up, but would no longer produce sketches for SNL.

== Members ==
=== Ben Marshall ===
Ben Marshall (born May 1, 1995) grew up in Savannah, Georgia, where he attended the Savannah Arts Academy. He graduated from the NYU Tisch School of the Arts in 2017. At NYU, he was involved in the Hammerkatz sketch comedy and Astor Place Riots stand-up comedy groups. Prior to SNL, he worked as an after-school counselor at the 14th Street Y while pursuing comedy. In 2025, he guest-starred in an episode of season two of Poker Face. On September 2, 2025, Marshall was announced to become a featured player on SNL, promoted from writer and short-form video creator to full-time cast member.

=== John Higgins ===
John Higgins (born November 14, 1995) grew up in Montclair, New Jersey. Born into an entertainment family, he is one of four children of Steve Higgins, a producer and writer for SNL most widely known as the announcer of The Tonight Show Starring Jimmy Fallon. He is the nephew of actor David Anthony Higgins, actor Chris Elliott, and comedy writer Alan J. Higgins and the cousin of actress Abby Elliott. He attended Montclair Kimberley Academy, and has cited Simon Rich as a major influence during this time. Higgins attended New York University where he was part of the Hammerkatz sketch comedy troupe and graduated with an English degree from the NYU College of Arts & Sciences in 2018. Outside of his work with Please Don't Destroy, he has appeared in the films A Man Called Otto (2022) and the indie comedy The Country Club (2023). He is married to comedian Emily Wilson. In September 2025, Higgins announced that he would leave SNL after four seasons as a writer.

=== Martin Herlihy ===
Martin Herlihy (born September 13, 1998) grew up in Ridgefield, Connecticut, the son of Tim Herlihy, a longtime comedy partner of Adam Sandler and a writer-producer for SNL in the 1990s. Herlihy attended Ridgefield High School and graduated from NYU Tisch in 2019. At NYU, he was involved in Astor Place Riots stand-up comedy. In September 2026, it was announced that Herlihy would leave SNL after five seasons as a writer.

== Saturday Night Live prerecorded sketches ==
Season	Episodes	Shorts aired	Shorts cut	Originally released	
Season	Episodes	Shorts aired	Shorts cut	First released	Last released
Season 47	21	7	5	October 9, 2021	April 16, 2022
Season 48	18	11	0	October 8, 2022	April 15, 2023
Season 49	20	10	1	October 14, 2023	May 11, 2024
Season 50	21	6	1	October 19, 2024	May 17, 2025

=== Season 47 (2021–22) ===
Title	Original airdate	Description
Hard Seltzer	October 9, 2021	Three Saturday Night Live writers – Martin, Ben, and John – discover a variety of hard seltzers.
Rami Wants a Treat	October 16, 2021	Host Rami Malek explains why he deserves to be rewarded for being on his best behavior at SNL. Filmed for Malek's episode but cut for time.
Calling Angie	November 6, 2021	John tries to reconcile with his ex-girlfriend Angie (Sarah Sherman), but the call goes off the rails.
Three Sad Virgins	November 13, 2021	Pete Davidson creates a music video about three sad virgins (Martin, Ben, and John) and is joined by musical guest Taylor Swift.
Touch Up	November 20, 2021	Martin, Ben, and John discuss the work they've had done, including Ben's botox and John's longer fingers. Filmed for the Simu Liu episode but cut for time.
Future Selves	December 11, 2021	Martin, Ben, and John are visited by their future selves who warn them of disasters, but they become distracted by how disappointing their future lives are. Features guest stars James Ciccone, Tim Hayes, and George Aloi as the future selves. Filmed for the Billie Eilish episode but cut for time.
New Personalities	January 22, 2022	The three writers try out some new personalities such as "Dude whose years of research got rocked" and "The Subway Guy." Filmed for the Will Forte episode but cut for time.
Martin's Friend	January 29, 2022	Martin introduces John and Ben to his new friend Connor, who is 10 years old. John and Ben initially dislike Connor, but the four end up becoming friends. Connor wants to pitch jokes to Colin Jost for Weekend Update, and Jost appears telling Connor he loves them.
Good Variant	February 26, 2022	A celebration breaks out after news of a new COVID variant that is actually good. Host John Mulaney plays a news anchor reporting on the new variant. Paul Rudd tests positive for the variant and passes it to Martin, Ben and John. Al Roker and Sarah Sherman also join the celebrations.
We Got Her a Cat	March 12, 2022	The three writers plan to surprise host Zoë Kravitz with a cat, but it does not go as expected. Paul Dano is found to be living in the writers' office as he is doing research for a movie about "three guys who suck."
Three Normal Goths	April 2, 2022	A group of goths with conventional tastes live completely normal lives. Host Jerrod Carmichael appears and is judged by the goths for his fashion choices. Filmed for Carmichael's episode but cut for time.
Lizzo Has Writer's Block	April 16, 2022	Host and musical guest Lizzo needs help writing two new songs for her SNL performance. Andrew Dismukes appears as himself and threatens to kill Lizzo if her new songs are not good enough.

=== Season 48 (2022–23) ===
Title	Original airdate	Description
Tommy	October 8, 2022	Martin, Ben, and John play high school versions of themselves who find out that their best friend Tommy (played by host Brendan Gleeson) is a 67-year-old Irish man. This is the first PDD sketch to take place completely outside of their office.
Wellness	October 15, 2022	The boys talk about things that they do to stay healthy.
Election Night	November 12, 2022	New cast member Molly Kearney suddenly wins the election for Attorney General of Ohio thanks to a drunken Tweet, and the boys must mold them into a proper, TV-ready politician in time for their victory speech. Steve Kornacki cameos as himself, giving the election results. Also features Sarah Sherman and Steve Higgins.
Chelsea	December 10, 2022	Martin and Ben find themselves in a bad situation when John reunites with his ex-girlfriend (Sarah Sherman). Also features Chloe Fineman, Michael Che, and hosts Steve Martin and Martin Short. Sherman's father, Andrew Sherman, cameos in this film.
Plirts	December 17, 2022	The boys create a shirt made of plastic, pitching the idea to host Austin Butler. New cast members Devon Walker and Marcello Hernández join in on the fun, as does musical guest Lizzo.
The Stakeout	February 25, 2023	Ben holds a stakeout with host Woody Harrelson to find out what Martin and John are hiding from him. It turns out they have a secret family and are holding auditions to replace Ben. Also features Kenan Thompson.
Self-Defense	March 4, 2023	After being insulted by the interns, the boys go to a self-defense class led by Kirk Lightning (played by host Travis Kelce).
Road Trip	March 11, 2023	The boys and host Jenna Ortega sing about going on a cross country road trip.
Street Eats	April 1, 2023	Three guys film a show called Street Eats where they go around New York to try exotic foods and interact with people of different races. Also features host Quinta Brunson and Marcello Hernández.
Molly Shannon2k23	April 8, 2023	The boys show host Molly Shannon a video game where they simulate her life. Eventually, she gets into the game as well.
Hangxiety	April 15, 2023	The boys and host Ana de Armas talk about having a hangover after the show's afterparty. Also features Michael Longfellow, Ego Nwodim, Heidi Gardner, Bowen Yang, and Chloe Fineman.

=== Season 49 (2023–24) ===
Title	Original airdate	Description
The Original Princes of Comedy	October 14, 2023	The guys reflect on their early comedy careers with host Pete Davidson.
Bad Bunny is Shrek	October 21, 2023	Bad Bunny (the host and musical guest for this episode) writes his own version of Shrek, with each of the boys playing their own character (Ben as Puss in Boots, Martin as Donkey, and John as Michael Jackson).
Dawg Food	October 28, 2023	Martin and John eat "Dawg" Food, while Ben is clearly disgusted.
Jumper	November 11, 2023	Martin, Ben, and John find a suicidal musician (played by host Timothée Chalamet) on the ledge of a building, and they try to talk him off of it.
Ramen Order	November 18, 2023	The boys attempt to order ramen as John finds out his girlfriend is breaking up with him.
AI	December 2, 2023	Martin tries to confess his love for host Emma Stone, but due to a hard drive malfunction, the producers use AI technology in some shots to replace her with stunt double and cast member Punkie Johnson, with Ben and John also being replaced by AI. Also features Marcello Hernández.
Pimp My Ride	January 20, 2024	The boys attempt to fix a janitor's (played by host Jacob Elordi) car. Filmed for Elordi's episode but cut for time. Also features Mikey Day and Xzibit.
Roast	January 27, 2024	The boys and host Dakota Johnson trade insults about each other.
Gone Too Soon	March 2, 2024	The boys tell host Sydney Sweeney about a friend of theirs who just died. Features Steve Higgins, and James Ciccone as Chef Boyardee.
We Got Too High	March 30, 2024	Whilst at a club with host Ramy Youssef and musical guest Travis Scott, the boys sing a song about getting too high on weed.
Explore Page	May 11, 2024	The boys try to hide their Instagram explore pages from their girlfriends (played by Sarah Sherman, Ego Nwodim, and Chloe Fineman). It's revealed that their pages are full of videos from Uneesa Confidence (played by host Maya Rudolph).

=== Season 50 (2024–25) ===
Title	Original airdate	Description
Skydiving	October 19, 2024	The boys try to go skydiving, but soon start having second thoughts. Featuring appearances by Michael Keaton and Emil Wakim.
Mean Cute	November 16, 2024	Charli XCX (the host and musical guest for this episode) bumps into the boys in meet-cute fashion but ends up trading insults with them. Filmed for Charli XCX's episode but cut for time.
Paul Mescal Is Daddy	December 7, 2024	Host Paul Mescal expresses his love for the boys and wants to start a life with them.
The Sound	March 1, 2025	On a parody of The Voice, the judges (played by the boys and Ego Nwodim) are repulsed by an ugly contestant who can sing (played by host Shane Gillis).
Mikey Madison is Squidward	March 29, 2025	Host Mikey Madison pitches her newest idea to the boys: a version of SpongeBob SquarePants with the main characters as best friends living life in New York City.
Missing Person	April 13, 2025	The boys and host Jon Hamm are police detectives ordering dinner while dealing with a missing person case.
First Class	May 17, 2025	The boys and host Scarlett Johansson rap about their fears about crashing during a plane flight to Newark. Featuring an appearance by musical guest Bad Bunny.

== Filmography ==
Please Don't Destroy film work
Title	Release	Description
The Treasure of Foggy Mountain	November 17, 2023	Three childhood friends who live and work together do not like where their lives are headed and set off to find treasure that is rumored to be buried on a nearby mountain.
Please Don't Destroy LIVE: Full Sketch Special / Tour Doc	July 14, 2025	A documentary film of Please Don't Destroy's Summer 2023 live sketch tour, released directly to YouTube.

== See also ==
- SNL Digital Shorts
- The Lonely Island
