= Paul Briganti =

American director (born 1987)

- Born: 1987 (age 38–39); Stratford, Connecticut, United States
- Education: School of the Visual Arts
- Occupation: Director
- Years active: 2010–present
- Known for: video director on Saturday Night Live
- Children: 1

Paul Briganti (born c. 1987) is an American director. He rose to prominence as a video director for Saturday Night Live for five seasons.

== Personal life ==
Briganti grew up in Stratford, Connecticut. His parents divorced when he was a child.

After making films with his friends during high school, Briganti moved to New York City where he studied film editing at the School of Visual Arts.

As of 2023, Briganti lives in Los Angeles, California with his wife and child.

== Career ==
After graduating from college, Briganti moved to Bushwick and began making comedic videos for the humour website CollegeHumor, going on to become site director. Briganti also directed videos for other online media including Funny or Die and the Onion. In 2010, Briganti directed "Fuck Me, Ray Bradbury", a satirical video featuring Rachel Bloom that was nominated for the Hugo Award for Best Dramatic Presentation, Short Form.

In 2016, Briganti was hired as a director on Saturday Night Live. He directed several noticeable performances, including multiple sketches featuring Melissa McCarthy as Sean Spicer, as well as Brad Pitt as Anthony Fauci. In 2021, the comedy troupe Please Don't Destroy joined the writing the staff of Saturday Night Live; Briganti directed their first sketches on the programme, including "Three Sad Virgins" featuring Taylor Swift, before leaving the show at the end of the season.

In television, Briganti also directed segments of The Late Late Show with James Corden, as well as episodes of Adam Ruins Everything, Crazy Ex-Girlfriend, Chad and At Home with Amy Sedaris. He also directed commercials for Citi, Hanes, Wendy's, Burger King and Hotels.com.

In 2019, the film Greener Grass was released, adapted from Briganti's short film of the same name produced in 2015.

In 2021, it was announced that Briganti would direct The Black Belt, starring and produced by Chris Pratt, from a script by Randall Green. In 2022, Briganti was reported to be working on an original television project with Tina Fey.

Briganti directed his first feature-length film project, Please Don't Destroy: The Treasure of Foggy Mountain, starring John Higgins, Ben Marshall and Martin Herlihy of Please Don't Destroy, as well as Conan O'Brien and John Goodman. Produced by Judd Apatow, filming took place in 2022 in North Carolina. While the film was initially announced as having a theatrical release, it was ultimately released on the streaming platform Peacock in 2023. The Treasure of Foggy Mountain received mixed to negative reviews, but did chart at number 9 on Peacock's top 10 streaming chart in January 2025.

In November 2026, it was announced that Briganti would direct the comedy film Non-Refundable, starring Millie Bobby Brown and Jack Innanen, and to be released by Netflix.

== Influences ==
Briganti has cited Mel Brooks as being an influence in his work, as well as watching romantic comedies like Broadcast News and Moonstruck as a child and Wet Hot American Summer as a teenager. He has also stated his admiration for directors including Steven Soderbergh, Nora Ephron and James L. Brooks.
