= Please Don't Destroy: The Treasure of Foggy Mountain =

2023 film by Paul Briganti

- Promotional release poster
- Directed by: Paul Briganti
- Written by: Martin Herlihy; John Higgins; Ben Marshall
- Produced by: Judd Apatow; Jimmy Miller
- Starring: Martin Herlihy; John Higgins; Ben Marshall; Bowen Yang; Meg Stalter; X Mayo; Nichole Sakura; Cedric Yarbrough; Sunita Mani; Conan O'Brien
- Cinematography: Isiah Donté Lee
- Edited by: Daniel Gabbe
- Music by: Amie Doherty
- Production companies: Apatow Productions; Mosaic
- Distributed by: Peacock (through Universal Pictures)
- Release date: November 17, 2023
- Running time: 92 minutes
- Country: United States
- Language: English

Please Don't Destroy: The Treasure of Foggy Mountain is a 2023 American buddy comedy adventure film directed by Paul Briganti, produced by Judd Apatow and Jimmy Miller, and written by and starring the comedy troupe Please Don't Destroy, consisting of Martin Herlihy, John Higgins, and Ben Marshall. In the film, a fictionalized version of the group searches for a lost treasure that they had initially been searching for as kids. Bowen Yang, Meg Stalter, X Mayo, Nichole Sakura, Cedric Yarbrough, Sunita Mani, and Conan O'Brien also star.

Please Don't Destroy: The Treasure of Foggy Mountain was released on Peacock on November 17, 2023. The film received mixed reviews from critics.

== Plot ==
Ben, John, and Martin are childhood friends who live and work together at Trout Plus, an outdoor store owned by Ben's father Farley. John, who is becoming anxious at his friends' new interests—Ben in taking over Trout Plus from his father, Martin in his new religious girlfriend Amy—discovers through a TikTok video that a compass the three found as children may be a clue to a treasure hidden by explorer Jean Pierre La Roche. The treasure, a bust of Marie Antoinette, is worth $100 million.

The three set off for Foggy Mountain State Park, where they encounter park rangers Lisa and Taylor. Lisa and John take an instant interest in each other, and John reveals the goal of their trip. After meeting up with the trio in the park and Lisa sharing an intimate night with John, the two steal the boys' map and attempt to search for the treasure themselves. The boys discover that the compass points the way to the treasure, and after Ben unsuccessfully tries to fly to the location with a wingsuit, they are led to a hidden chamber inside a rock formation. The three fend off a wild animal and retrieve the bust.

After escaping from Lisa and Taylor, the boys come across a cult made up of treasure hunters who failed to find the bust. John attempts to hide the treasure, but it is found by the cultists, who prepare to ritually burn it as a rejection of their former greed. The cult's leader, Deetch Nordwind, has second thoughts, but before he can retrieve the bust John uses stage magic to disappear with the treasure; however, he decides to turn it over to Ben and Martin and return to the cult.

Two weeks later, Ben and Martin meet on the day the bust is to be sold. They are interrupted by John, who begs the two to rescue him from the cult. After initial reluctance, the two rush to save John and Lisa, who has also joined the cult. John accidentally reveals to the cult that the bust will be sold, and they rush to Trout Plus to steal the bust for themselves, leaving John behind. Ben and Martin rescue John and successfully use their wingsuits to fly back to the store, where the bust is being delivered to Gaten Matarazzo, only for him to be murdered by the cult. A battle ensues, with Nordwind retrieving the bust, only for a hawk the trio befriended to snatch it away. After Nordwind rushes to chase the hawk, it returns the bust to the boys. With the money from the bust, each of the boys achieve their dreams: John takes a trip to London with his friends, Ben starts his own business—a hair salon for boys—and Martin and Amy purchase a house together.

== Cast ==
- Ben Marshall as Ben
- John Higgins as John
- Martin Herlihy as Martin / Lawrence
- Conan O'Brien as Farley
- Bowen Yang as Deetch Nordwind
- Megan Stalter as Lisa
- X Mayo as Taylor
- Nichole Sakura as Amy
- Cedric Yarbrough as Gates
- Chloe Troast as Poppy
- Sunita Mani as Tricia
- Gaten Matarazzo as Himself
- John Goodman as Narrator

== Production ==
In July 2022, it was announced Universal Pictures acquired distribution rights for an untitled buddy comedy film starring comedy trio Please Don't Destroy from Apatow Productions. Shortly after its announcement, Conan O’Brien, Bowen Yang, Megan Stalter, X Mayo and Nichole Sakura joined the cast.

Filming took place in and around Charlotte, North Carolina, including the NoDa neighborhood in North Charlotte, beginning in mid-July 2022 and lasting for seven weeks. A Crunch Fitness in Charlotte's University City neighborhood was used as the exterior of Trout Plus, while the store's interiors were filmed in a former Dick's Sporting Goods at the Northlake Mall. Scenes set on the fictional Foggy Mountain were filmed in South Mountains State Park, Crowders Mountain State Park, and Mount Mitchell State Park. Bost Grist Mill, an historic farm in Concord, was used for the location of the cult's commune, as well as other forest scenes.

== Release ==
Please Don't Destroy: The Treasure of Foggy Mountain was initially slated for a theatrical release on August 18, 2023, but in May 2023 it was announced that Universal Pictures would instead release the film as a Peacock exclusive on November 17, 2023.

== Reception ==
On the review aggregator website Rotten Tomatoes, 42% of 31 critics' reviews are positive, with an average rating of 5.6/10. The website's consensus reads: "Please Don't Destroy: The Treasure of Foggy Mountain has its share of funny moments, but they aren't enough to fill a full-length feature." Metacritic, which uses a weighted average, assigned the film a score of 49 out of 100, based on 13 critics, indicating "mixed or average" reviews. Reactions ranged from Brian Tallerico at RogerEbert.com, who wrote that the film "has the common problem of sketch artists turned filmmakers in that the runtime feels like a lot for a few jokes," to Dan Kois in Slate, who wrote that it "made me laugh so hard I missed a number of jokes."
