= Escape from Shit Mountain =

- Poker Face episode
- Episode no.: Season 1 Episode 9
- Directed by: Rian Johnson
- Written by: Nora Zuckerman; Lilla Zuckerman
- Cinematography by: Steve Yedlin
- Editing by: Bob Ducsay
- Original release date: March 2, 2023
- Running time: 59 minutes

Guest appearances
- Joseph Gordon-Levitt as Trey Nelson; David Castañeda as Jimmy Silva; Stephanie Hsu as "Mortimer Bernstein"; Benjamin Bratt as Cliff LeGrand

Episode chronology
← Previous "The Orpheus Syndrome"	Next → "The Hook"

"Escape from Shit Mountain" is the ninth episode of the American murder mystery comedy-drama television series Poker Face. The episode was written by showrunners Nora Zuckerman and Lilla Zuckerman and directed by series creator Rian Johnson. It was released on Peacock on March 2, 2023.

The series follows Charlie Cale, a woman with the ability to detect if people are lying; after exposing a murder plot at a casino, she is now on the run from the owner's enforcer Cliff LeGrand. In the episode, Charlie tries to leave a snowy town in the mountains of Colorado. After meeting a pickpocket, she finds her life in danger.

The episode received critical acclaim, with critics praising Johnson's directing, and the writing, performances, tension and cinematography.

== Plot ==
Former trader Trey Nelson (Joseph Gordon-Levitt), having been placed under house arrest for insider trading, is warned by his parole officer that his ankle monitor will be deactivated for the night due to a blizzard. Seizing the opportunity, Trey leaves his house and recklessly drives his Lamborghini Urus; in the process, his car accidentally hits a woman. Believing the woman is dead, Trey places her in the car's trunk and drives to a motel owned by his friend Jimmy Silva (David Castañeda). With Jimmy's reluctant help, he throws the woman's body in "the spot", a hole under a tree in the nearby woods. Back at the motel, the pair discuss their history together over Trey's favorite brand of coconut rum until they hear someone aggressively knocking on the door. They open the door and find the woman, who is still alive and has dug her way out and crawled to the motel. Jimmy prepares to shoot her until he notices a blue Plymouth Barracuda approaching. Trey hides the gun in his pocket and asks the driver for help.

A few months earlier, Charlie (Natasha Lyonne) is driving her Plymouth to a national park in Colorado. She decides to settle in "Magic Mountain" after striking up a romance with a local man. By February, she is alone again and trying to earn money to leave "Shit Mountain". Charlie catches a kleptomaniac shoplifter (Stephanie Hsu) trying to steal her wallet. Charlie calls the shoplifter "Morty" after the name on the stolen credit card she carries, "Mortimer Bernstein". Morty offers to pay the gas for Charlie's car in exchange for catching a ride with her. While driving, a deer steps in front of the car, causing Charlie to swerve off the road and get stuck. Distrustful of her, she has Morty return to the gas station to ask for a tow truck while she remains in the car. After night falls, Morty has not returned. Charlie decides to get help by herself, but after a few steps out towards the road, she is hit by Trey's Lamborghini.

Charlie wakes up under the tree's roots. She crawls out and manages to reach the motel, but briefly passes out due to exhaustion. Morty arrives at the same time in Charlie's car. Charlie wakes up with a broken leg, probed by Trey and Jimmy about what she remembers, but she does not fully recollect the events. Because of the blizzard, the group is unable to leave the motel or use the phone. Morty picks up a "stick" Charlie used to knock on the door and is horrified to discover that it is actually a bone. Inspecting it, Charlie and Morty deduce that it possibly belongs to Chloe Jones, a local woman who went missing ten years earlier, and find that there is a $75,000 reward for information on her whereabouts. Charlie notices Trey's ankle monitor and grows wary of him and Jimmy, while Morty is fixated over the reward money. Trey and Jimmy, being the ones who hid Chloe's body in "the spot" years ago, argue over what to do with Charlie and Morty. Jimmy wants Trey to pay them for their silence, while Trey wants to kill them.

Morty leaves to purportedly retrieve items from the car, but actually goes to the spot and takes photos of Chloe's remains. Trey arrives to kill her, but realizes she took his gun. Trey offers his Lamborghini in exchange for Morty's silence. However, once Morty takes the driver's seat, Trey smacks her head on the wheel. He retrieves the gun, erases the evidence from her phone and pushes the Lamborghini off a cliff, killing Morty. Back at the motel, Charlie and Jimmy bond over Jimmy's history with Chloe, as he reveals that he was smitten with her, while she was in a complicated relationship with Trey. He secretly feels guilty, thinking he caused her death with drugs he had given to Trey. He gives Charlie what he claims to be ibuprofen tablets. When she goes to drink in Trey's cup, she recognizes the rum's smell from when she was dragged into the car trunk. She connects the dots as she seemingly passes out from the drug.

Trey returns and reveals that he killed Morty, angering Jimmy and leading to an argument. Charlie, who faked taking the pills, tries to retrieve her car keys while overhearing the two. She is cornered by Trey and Jimmy. Charlie tells Jimmy that Trey lied about how Chloe died; in actuality, Trey killed her in a fit of rage. Trey tries to buy his way out, but Jimmy, convinced by Charlie's plea, refuses. He takes a knife and stands up for Charlie, only to be shot by Trey. Charlie retrieves Jimmy's knife and cuts Trey's leg. He overpowers her and stabs her in the chest. He places the bodies of Charlie and Jimmy in "the spot" and leaves, but not before unknowingly drinking the spiked rum. He returns home in Charlie's car despite the drug's effect, in time to meet with his parole officer. However, he notices too late that his ankle monitor is missing. Charlie is revealed to be alive and to have taken the monitor when she cut him, clutching on to it while she was thrown in the hole.

Charlie wakes up in a hospital room, where she sees a news report that the authorities have found the bodies and arrested Trey, identifying Morty as Charlie Cale since Morty took Charlie's wallet. Charlie sees a "Jane Doe" tag on her wrist and bursts out laughing, elated to discover that she has been declared dead. However, in the hospital parking lot, Cliff (Benjamin Bratt) is seen talking with Sterling Frost Sr. on the phone, ready to ambush Charlie.

== Production ==
=== Development ===
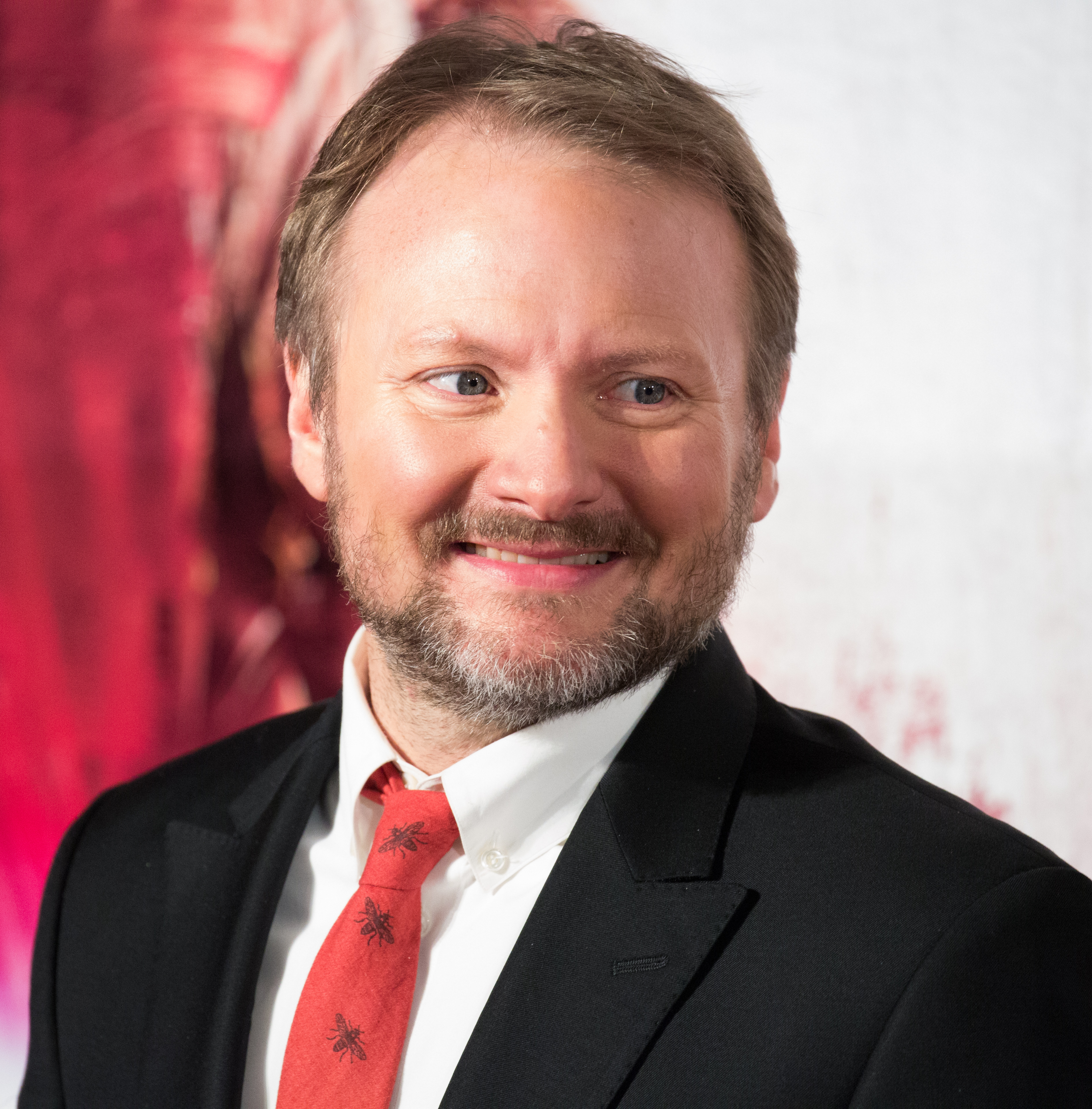
Series creator Rian Johnson directed the episode.

The series was announced in March 2021, with Rian Johnson serving as creator, writer, director and executive producer. Johnson stated that the series would delve into "the type of fun, character driven, case-of-the-week mystery goodness I grew up watching." The episode was directed by series creator Rian Johnson, while executive producers Nora Zuckerman and Lilla Zuckerman wrote it. This was Johnson's third directing credit, and the Zuckermans' first writing credit for the show. Nora Zuckerman later revealed that the episode was "probably the lowest script fee we've ever received in our careers."

=== Casting ===
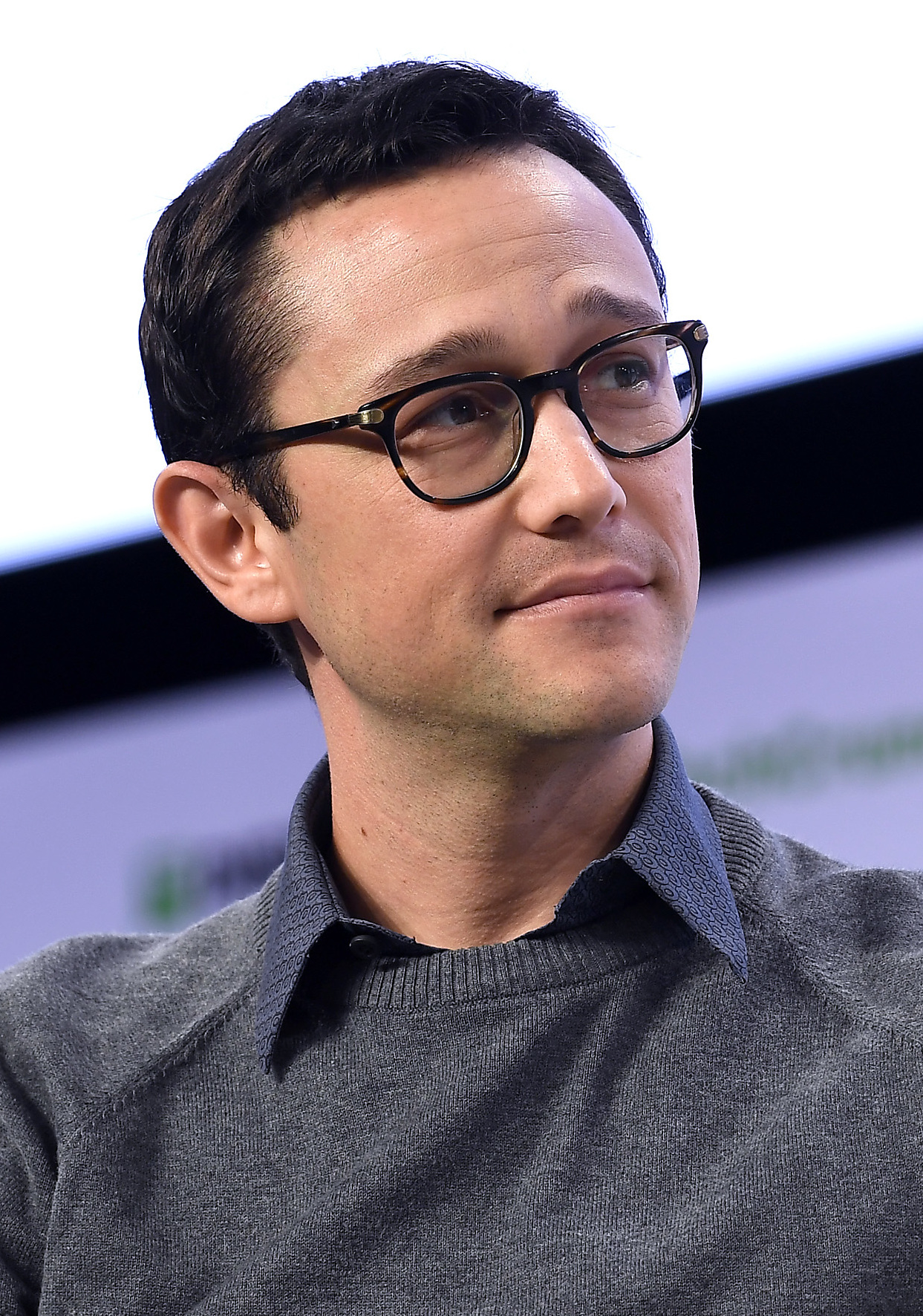
Joseph Gordon-Levitt guest stars in the episode, having appeared in all of Johnson's films.

The announcement of the series included that Natasha Lyonne would serve as the main lead actress. She was approached by Johnson about working on a procedural project together, with Lyonne as the lead character. As Johnson explained, the role was "completely cut to measure for her." Benjamin Bratt also joined the series in the recurring role of Cliff, whose character chases Charlie after she ran away from the casino in the first episode.

Due to the series' procedural aspects, the episodes feature several guest stars. Johnson was inspired by the amount of actors who guest starred on Columbo, wanting to deem each guest star as the star of the episode, which allowed them to attract many actors. The episode featured appearances by Joseph Gordon-Levitt, Stephanie Hsu, and David Castañeda, who were announced to guest star in April 2022.

Gordon-Levitt previously worked with Johnson in all of his films, accepting the extended role compared to his previous cameos, as his schedule allowed it. As his past roles were voice cameos, this was the first on-set collaboration between Gordon-Levitt and Johnson since Looper. He explained his approach to portraying Trey, "What are the circumstances that led them to be making these bad choices... with this character, I didn't feel as obligated to find the complexity. In fact, I thought it would be fun to lean into playing a really bad person who just sucked."

=== Writing ===
Johnson pitched the concept of setting the episode in a motel during a snowstorm. From there, the writers came up with concepts on what would happen, with Wyatt Cain suggesting that the motel could be related to a car accident, which by itself led to the tree spot.

The montage with Charlie at the beginning was done to further highlight her arc, with Nora Zuckerman saying "we had talked about Charlie lives her life on the road. And most of the time that we've picked her up at the beginning of these episodes and she's in a pretty good place. She's started a job somewhere. She's doing all right. In this, once you get past the Magic Mountain part when you find her at Sh** Mountain, she's not in a good place. She's really struggling and we liked that because I think that's realistic. Life on the road is not always easy. She's just desperate to get off Sh** Mountain."

=== Filming ===
While the episode was the ninth to air, it was actually the first episode to be filmed. Nora Zuckerman explained the episode's placement, "Because we leave Charlie in such a state that you can't just pick her up and move her to working with go karts. It really had to be the second to last episode. We broke it in the middle of the season, but we knew it was going to be the second to last episode, which is also part of the fun of working on a show like this, where every episode is basically standalone and you don't necessarily have to have them in order when you're breaking them." It was shot in Upstate New York in the spring, with the snow added in post-production.

== Critical reception ==
"Escape from Shit Mountain" received critical acclaim. Saloni Gajjar of The A.V. Club gave the episode an "A–" grade and wrote, "For a penultimate hour, I'm thrilled we finally see a more profound payoff for her year on the road and a glimpse of her backstory. Johnson is saving more details about Charlie's history for season two, but we forgive him because he helms a fantastic episode this week with 'Escape From Shit Mountain'. It features Lyonne's best Poker Face performance to date, answers some burning questions, and, of course, welcomes some exciting guest stars–a PF trademark at this point, much like its inspiration, Columbo."

Alan Sepinwall of Rolling Stone wrote, "This one was just a masterclass in suspense, because Charlie is at such a seeming disadvantage this time: terribly injured, isolated, and outnumbered, especially since Hsu's Morty is mostly out for herself."

Amanda Whiting of Vulture gave the episode a perfect 5 star rating out of 5 and wrote, "I watched 'Escape From Shit Mountain,' the first episode since the premiere to come to a truly satisfying and unexpected conclusion. Even the other episodes I've most enjoyed — the Chloë Sevigny and Judith Light ones — didn't feel this complete. It has sizzle; it has scares; an attractive man appears shirtless for reasons entirely superfluous to the plot. And the guest stars all crackle with chaotic energy." Sarah Fields of Telltale TV gave the episode a 4 star rating out of 5 and wrote, "'Escape From Shit Mountain' might not be one of Poker Face's most original episodes, but it is still one of its best and sets viewers up perfectly for what will no doubt be an intense finale."
