= X Mayo =

American comedian and actress (born 1987)

- Born: July 27, 1987 (age 39); Inglewood, California, U.S.

Comedy career
- Years active: 2017–present
- Medium: Television, film
- Website: xmayo.me

Xochitl Gabriela Mayo (born July 27, 1987), known professionally as X Mayo (/ˈmaɪ.oʊ/ MY-oh), is an American comedian, writer, producer, and actress. She was a staff writer for The Daily Show. Mayo has acted in the series Strangers, The Good Doctor, Swarm, American Auto (2021–2023), Loot, and Wonder Man. She also acted in the films The Farewell (2019), The Blackening (2022), and Freakier Friday (2025).

== Early life ==
Mayo was born and raised in Inglewood, California. She is Afro-Latina. She trained in dance, writing, and acting while growing up. After attending college, she dropped out and began training as a makeup artist. She moved to New York City to work in the makeup industry and went on to study improvisational comedy at Upright Citizens Brigade.

== Career ==
Mayo produced and starred in the sketch comedy web series Who Made the Potato Salad, which co-starred other comedians of color. In 2019 she worked with Shenovia Large to host the comedy show "Unsung Heroes Of...", which was recommended by Time Out New York.

Her first professional comedy writing job was as a staff writer on The Daily Show from 2018–2021. She was nominated for a Primetime Emmy Award for Outstanding Writing for a Variety Series for her work.

Mayo was a recurring cast member on the Facebook Live series Strangers. She was also a supporting character in the films Finding ʻOhana and The Farewell. In 2022, Mayo co-starred in the film The Blackening. She had a supporting role in the Amazon series Swarm.

She was a main cast member on the NBC series American Auto, which ran for two seasons (2021–2023). In October 2023, it was reported that Mayo was being considered as a host for After Midnight, the series that would take over the timeslot held by The Late Late Show with James Corden after Corden's departure, although the role was ultimately granted to Taylor Tomlinson.

In 2023, she joined the cast of the movie The Treasure of Foggy Mountain, playing park ranger Taylor, alongside Megan Stalter.

In December 2025 it was announced that Mayo will write and produce the comedy series Checkpoint for CBS, based on her previous experiences working as a TSA agent.

She was a co-lead in the 2026 Marvel television series Wonder Man. The following month Mayo featured in the Scrubs revival series as Nurse Pippa Raymond, alongside Michael James Scott as Nurse Francois Dubois.

== Awards and nominations ==
- 2020 – Nominee, Primetime Emmy Award for Outstanding Writing for a Variety Series (for The Daily Show)

== Filmography ==
=== Television ===
Year	Title	Role	Notes	Ref.
2018	Strangers	Robbie	Recurring role	
2018–2021	The Daily Show	Various	Staff writer	
2021	The Good Doctor	Zara Norton	1 episode	
2021	Yearly Departed	Herself		
2021–2023	American Auto	Dori Otis	Main role; 20 episodes	
2023	Swarm	Cheeks	Episode: "Honey"	
2024-2026	Abbott Elementary	Lisa	2 episodes	
2025	Loot	Destiny	Recurring role	
2026	Wonder Man	Janelle Jackson	6 episodes	
2026	Scrubs	Nurse Pippa Raymond	6 episodes	

=== Film ===
Year	Title	Role	Notes	Ref.
2019	The Farewell	Suze		
2021	Finding ʻOhana	Melody		
2022	The Blackening	Shanika		
2023	Please Don't Destroy: The Treasure of Foggy Mountain	Taylor		
2025	Freakier Friday	Principal Waldman		
2026	Office Romance	Vanessa		
