= Last Looks (Poker Face) =

- Poker Face episode
- Episode no.: Season 2 Episode 2
- Directed by: Natasha Lyonne
- Written by: Alice Ju; Natasha Lyonne
- Cinematography by: Jaron Presant
- Editing by: Shaheed Qaasim
- Original air date: May 8, 2025
- Running time: 50 minutes

Guest appearances
- Giancarlo Esposito as Fred Finch; Kevin Corrigan as Tommy Sullivan; Katie Holmes as Greta Finch; Rhea Perlman as Beatrix Hasp; Kathrine Narducci as Mrs. Hoppenstammer; Sherry Cola as Paige

Episode chronology
| ← Previous "The Game Is a Foot" | Next → "Whack-A-Mole" |

"Last Looks" is the second episode of the second season of the American murder mystery comedy-drama television series Poker Face. It is the twelfth overall episode of the series and was written by co-executive producer Alice Ju and main lead actress Natasha Lyonne, and directed by Lyonne. It was released on Peacock on May 8, 2025.

The series follows Charlie Cale, a woman with the ability to detect if people are lying; after the events of the first season, Charlie is being pursued by hitmen sent by criminal boss Beatrix Hasp. In the episode, Charlie befriends a woman unhappy with her marriage to a funeral home owner. After the woman disappears, Charlie suspects the husband is involved.

The episode received highly positive reviews from critics, who praised Lyonne's directing, dark tone, and cliffhanger ending.

== Plot ==
In Yulee, Florida, a film crew is shooting a low-budget horror film set in 1973 at a funeral home. Owner Fred Finch (Giancarlo Esposito) is annoyed by the chaos and that all the lights cause an outage in the morgue. Fred's wife, Greta (Katie Holmes), is thrilled by the film crew's presence, but Fred is incensed to learn that she forgot to inform a family that they had to reschedule a funeral for their grandmother due to the shooting. Greta asks Fred for a divorce so she can move to Miami per a crew member's suggestion. When he suggests having a baby to save their marriage, Greta admits that she has felt trapped since they got married.

After the crew wraps and leaves, Fred lures Greta into the living room, where he kills her. He cremates her body, putting the ashes in an urn. The crew comes in the next day, cleaning up her blood along with the fake blood and taking the urn with them. After the crew leaves, Fred delightedly continues with his activities in the funeral home, turning Greta's remains into a vinyl of "Sleep Walk".

A few days prior, Charlie is approached by location manager Tommy Sullivan (Kevin Corrigan), who asks to use her Barracuda for a film set. Charlie agrees and is also cast as a background corpse in a casket. During a break, she meets Greta, who relates her unhappy marriage and her desire to become a makeup artist. As a woman offers her a job in Miami, Fred pulls her aside for failing to reschedule a funeral. Later, Charlie runs into Fred, who reveals that he earns extra revenue by turning dead people's remains into keepsakes for their loved ones. That night, Charlie gets drunk with Greta and the film crew, then takes her home, promising that they will leave for Miami together in the morning.

The following day, Charlie is told by Fred that Greta left with the rest of the film crew already. Using the crew's call sheet, she arrives at their new location to question her whereabouts. While Tommy is unable to find her, he agrees to help Charlie. They sneak into the funeral home, where Charlie spots blood on a light bulb. As she retrieves it, she is confronted by Fred. Charlie notes that while filming, the bulb would have been protected from blood splatter by a sheet of white silk. She deduces that he killed Greta after she asked for the divorce, and demands that he say that he did not kill her. However, Tommy arrives—Greta had just texted him that she was in Miami.

Fred feigns an emotional breakdown, causing Charlie to apologize and console him. In his office, Fred shows that he keeps deceased family members' remains in different parts of the room. When Charlie goes to the bathroom, she hears Greta's phone ringing and realizes Fred had sent the message when she finds it in a drawer. Fred drugs her and locks her in a casket, planning to cremate her. Charlie tips the casket over to escape and throws her vape cartridge into the fire, causing an explosion that injures Fred and sets the house ablaze. Charlie tries to drag him out, but a devastated Fred refuses to leave his family and Charlie flees alone. As she gets into her car, she is held at gunpoint by Beatrix Hasp (Rhea Perlman), who instructs her to drive.

== Production ==
=== Development ===
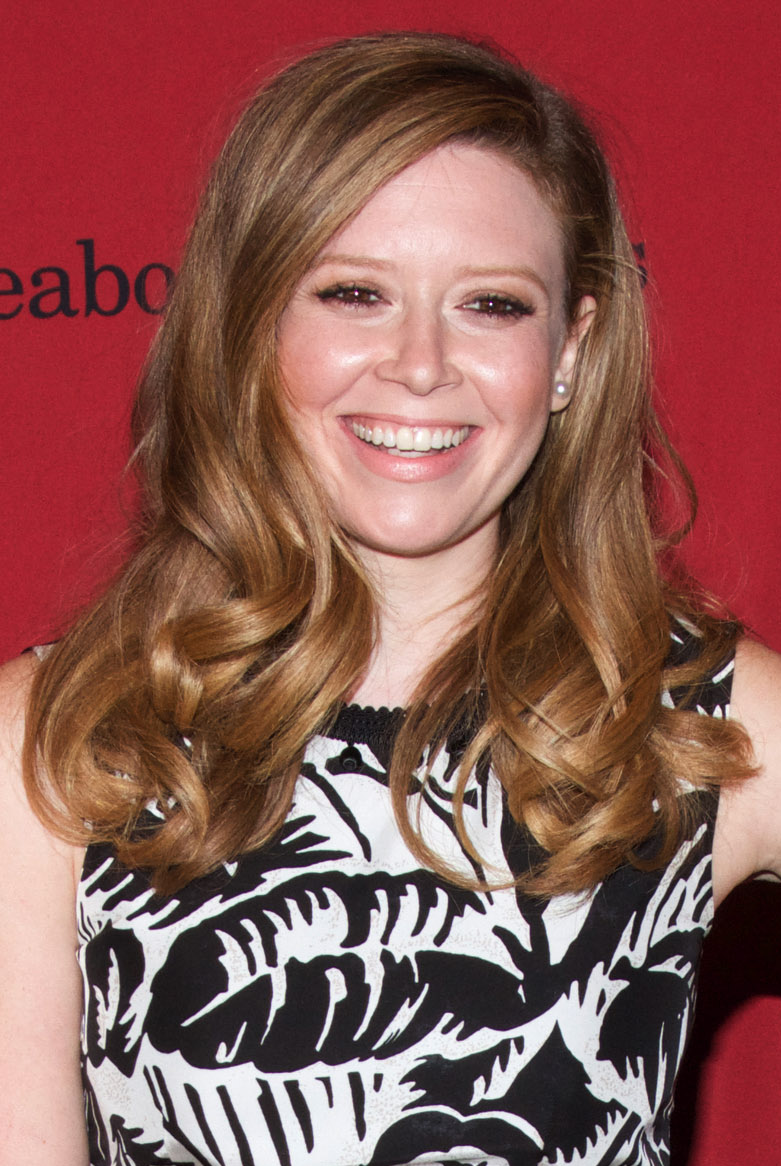
Series star Natasha Lyonne co-wrote and directed the episode.

The series was announced in March 2021, with Rian Johnson serving as creator, writer, director and executive producer. Johnson stated that the series would delve into "the type of fun, character driven, case-of-the-week mystery goodness I grew up watching." The episode was written by co-executive producer Alice Ju and main lead actress Natasha Lyonne, and directed by Lyonne. This was Ju's third writing credit, Lyonne's second writing credit, and Lyonne's second directing credit for the show.

=== Casting ===
The announcement of the series included that Natasha Lyonne would serve as the main lead actress. She was approached by Johnson about working on a procedural project together, with Lyonne as the lead character. As Johnson explained, the role was "completely cut to measure for her."

Due to the series' procedural aspects, the episodes feature several guest stars. Johnson was inspired by the amount of actors who guest starred on Columbo, wanting to deem each guest star as the star of the episode, which allowed them to attract many actors. The episode featured guest appearances by Giancarlo Esposito, Katie Holmes, Kevin Corrigan, Kathrine Narducci and Sherry Cola, who were announced to guest star in July 2024.

=== Filming ===
Filming for the episode began on July 1, 2024. While it was the first episode of the season to be filmed, it was the second to air.

== Critical reception ==
"Last Looks" received highly positive reviews from critics. Noel Murray of The A.V. Club gave the 3-episode premiere an "A–" grade and wrote, "“Last Looks” was directed by Lyonne, who also co-wrote the script with Alice Ju. That same team produced season one's “The Orpheus Syndrome,” a stylish mystery set in the world of motion-picture special effects. This episode is similarly moody, using the shooting of a horror movie as an excuse for a lot of skewed angles and deep shadows."

Alan Sepinwall wrote, "Lyonne is really good at playing a more vulnerable Charlie, but it's also a place that the series needs to be judicious about going to. She can be threatened by the killer in most episodes, but it has to be rare for her to seem this close to death for those moments to have weight. This one did, and it led into a rare cliffhanger, with Beatrix appearing in the back of the Barracuda, a gun at the ready." Elisa Guimarães of Collider wrote, ""Last Looks" is a story that falls on the darker side of Rian Johnson's creation, one that is on par with Season 1's "Escape from Shit Mountain." However, while that episode came later in the season and thus felt like it had higher stakes when it put Charlie's life on the line, "Last Looks" feels somewhat hollow in that regard. Its villain-of-the-week gets an appropriate ending, but how we get there and what happens to Charlie herself just doesn't seem earned."

Amanda Whiting of Vulture gave the episode a 4 star rating out of 5 and wrote, "Can we take a moment to celebrate Natasha Lyonne? I know we celebrate her fairly often, but the second episode of Poker Face's sophomore season is a testament to her range and her idiosyncrasies. As Charlie, she gets to show shades of the character we've rarely seen before, but Lyonne's stamp is all over “Last Looks” as its director and co-writer." Melody McCune of Telltale TV wrote, "Like episode one, the pacing is a bit on the slower side and inconsistent overall. However, the laid groundwork sets up that action-packed climax and cliffhanger. It's more narratively fruitful than the premiere, and it delightfully leans into some fun horror tropes."

Ben Sherlock of Screen Rant wrote, "Esposito was the perfect guest star for this role. Ever since his iconic turn as Gus Fring, he's made a career of playing characters who put on a friendly, unassuming facade to cover up their true evil nature. When Charlie is onto him and he turns on her, Esposito is every bit as terrifying as his Breaking Bad villain." Shay McBryde of Show Snob wrote, "It was great to see Charlie kick back and have some fun with some strangers at the banger in Poker Face season 2 episode 2. She has such a warm heart for people in need. It's a shame she couldn't catch a fresh start in Miami with Greta. Nonetheless, things worked out the way they were meant to."
