= The Game Is a Foot =

- Poker Face episode
- Episode no.: Season 2 Episode 1
- Directed by: Rian Johnson
- Written by: Laura Deeley
- Cinematography by: Jaron Presant
- Editing by: Bob Ducsay
- Original air date: May 8, 2025
- Running time: 55 minutes

Guest appearances
- Cynthia Erivo as the Kazinsky sisters; Jin Ha as Paul Fletcher; Jasmine Guy as Norma Kazinsky; Anthony DeSando as Gino

Episode chronology
| ← Previous "The Hook" | Next → "Last Looks" |

"The Game Is a Foot" is the first episode of the second season of the American murder mystery comedy-drama television series Poker Face. It is the 11th overall episode of the series and was written by co-executive producer Laura Deeley, and directed by series creator Rian Johnson. It was released on Peacock on May 8, 2025.

The series follows Charlie Cale, a woman with the ability to detect if people are lying; after the events of the first season, Charlie is being pursued by hitmen sent by criminal boss Beatrix Hasp. In the episode, Charlie finds herself involved in a family plot, in which a quintuplet killed one of her sisters to inherit their mother's fortune.

The episode received highly positive reviews from critics, who praised the humor and performances. Cynthia Erivo's guest appearance as the quintuplets earned her a Primetime Emmy Award nomination.

== Plot ==
In Conway, New Hampshire, Amber Kazinsky (Cynthia Erivo) takes care of her dying mother, Norma (Jasmine Guy). Her artistic career disappoints Norma, who uses every opportunity to insult her and mock her. Amber learns that Norma met with her lawyer Paul Fletcher (Jin Ha) and has cut her and her sisters out of her will, leaving everything to a woman named Felicity Price.

Amber travels to Vermont to meet Felicity, who is revealed to be a fifth identical sister. Felicity reveals that she grew up with their father, who hid her from the other sisters and died in a car crash they were both in. Realizing the only way to get the inheritance is to become Felicity, Amber undergoes a makeover to look exactly like her and visits Norma, who suffers a fatal stroke. Amber lets Norma die by removing the emergency call button and meets with Felicity wearing identical clothes. Amber fights Felicity and throws her off the cliff, then sends a video to her sisters detailing her intention to commit suicide. Amber discovers that Felicity had a prosthetic leg when inspecting the corpse, so she moves the body to a train track to make it look like Felicity's leg was crushed by the oncoming train. As the other sisters—Bebe, Cece, and Delia—find the body at the cliff, Amber poses as Felicity and meets with Paul to ask for the will.

Prior to this, Charlie (Natasha Lyonne) is seen taking different jobs across the country, forced to run away from hitmen sent by Beatrix Hasp. While working at an apple orchard, her co-worker Delia covers for her. Delia reveals that she and her identical sisters shared the lead role on the television show Kid Cop: Nights, for which Norma kept all the money earned, and pitted her daughters against each other. Charlie accompanies her to the funeral and meets Bebe and Cece. When "Felicity" shows up and relates her background to the sisters, Charlie detects that she is lying.

"Felicity" tells the sisters that she is keeping all of the money but is willing to give them $150,000 each if they sign a contract to not dispute the will. Bebe and Cece sign, but Delia refuses, feeling it was unfair to Amber after enduring the most abuse from Norma. Paul warns that if Delia files a lawsuit, it will hold up the estate for years and no one will receive any money. When Delia leaves, Amber dresses up as her and signs the paper on her behalf. However, she runs into Charlie before she can change back and is forced to remain while Charlie questions Paul over Felicity's background. Charlie notes that while Paul's claims are true, "Felicity" is lying when she says the same things. When Charlie confronts "Felicity", Amber assuages her suspicions by asserting that her identity is fluid, adopting different accents.

When the real Delia returns, she and Charlie realize that someone pretended to be her to sign the paper. The police are unable to find the foot supposedly crushed by the train. An officer mentions that he has "Footloose" stuck in his head, and Charlie realizes that all of Felicity's artwork is foot-related; she deduces Felicity was missing her left foot from the car accident. Amber shows her prosthetic, but Charlie drops a statue on her foot, causing it to bleed. The police arrive, having identified Felicity's fingerprints, and arrest Amber. As Felicity had no living relatives, the sisters receive Norma's money, allowing Delia to buy the apple orchard. Noticing the hitmen arrive, Charlie flees again.

== Production ==
=== Development ===
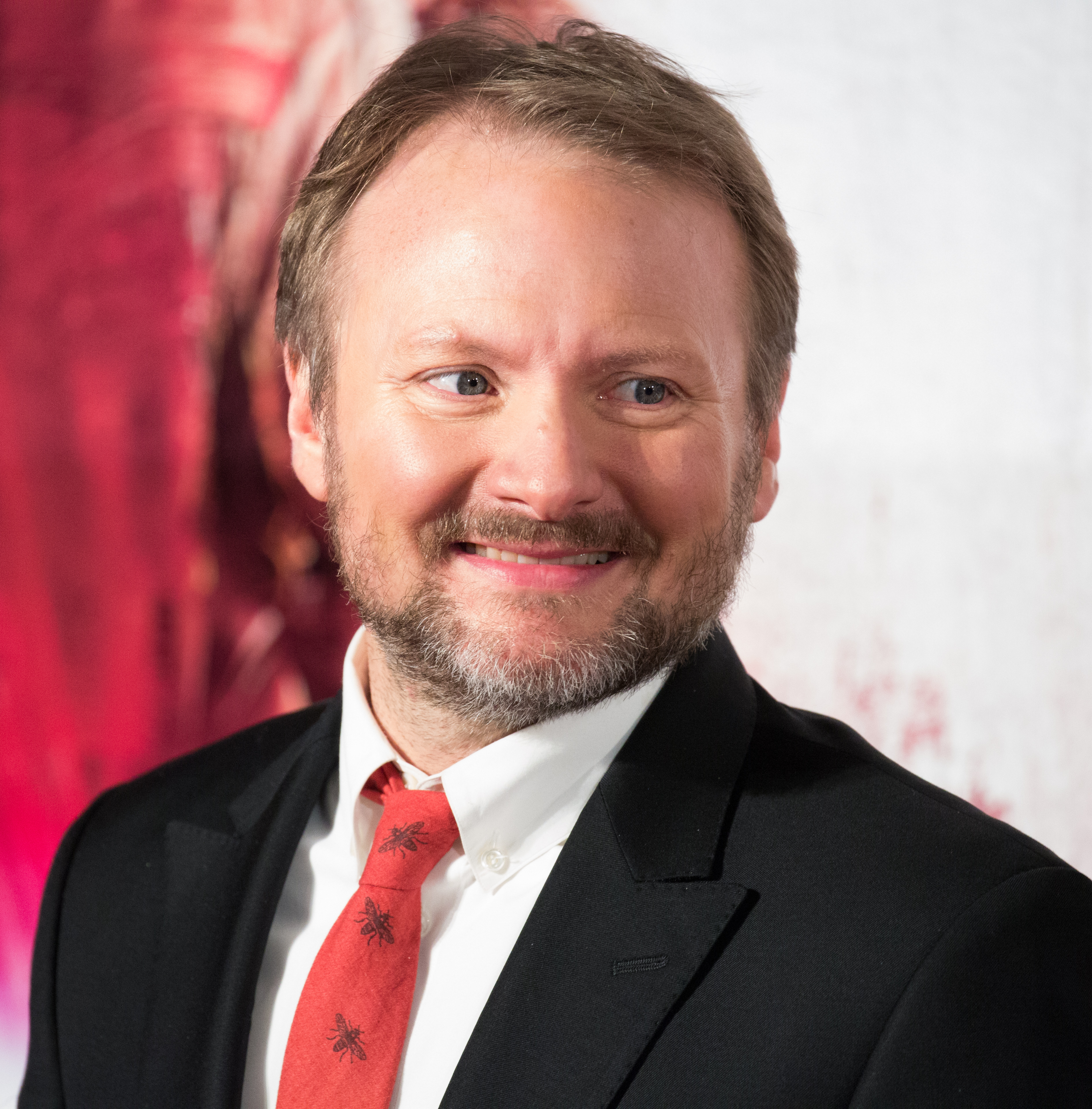
Series creator Rian Johnson directed the episode.

The series was announced in March 2021, with Rian Johnson serving as creator, writer, director and executive producer. Johnson stated that the series would delve into "the type of fun, character driven, case-of-the-week mystery goodness I grew up watching." The episode was written by co-executive producer Laura Deeley, and directed by series creator Rian Johnson. This was Deeley's first writing credit, and Johnson's fourth credit for the show.

=== Casting ===
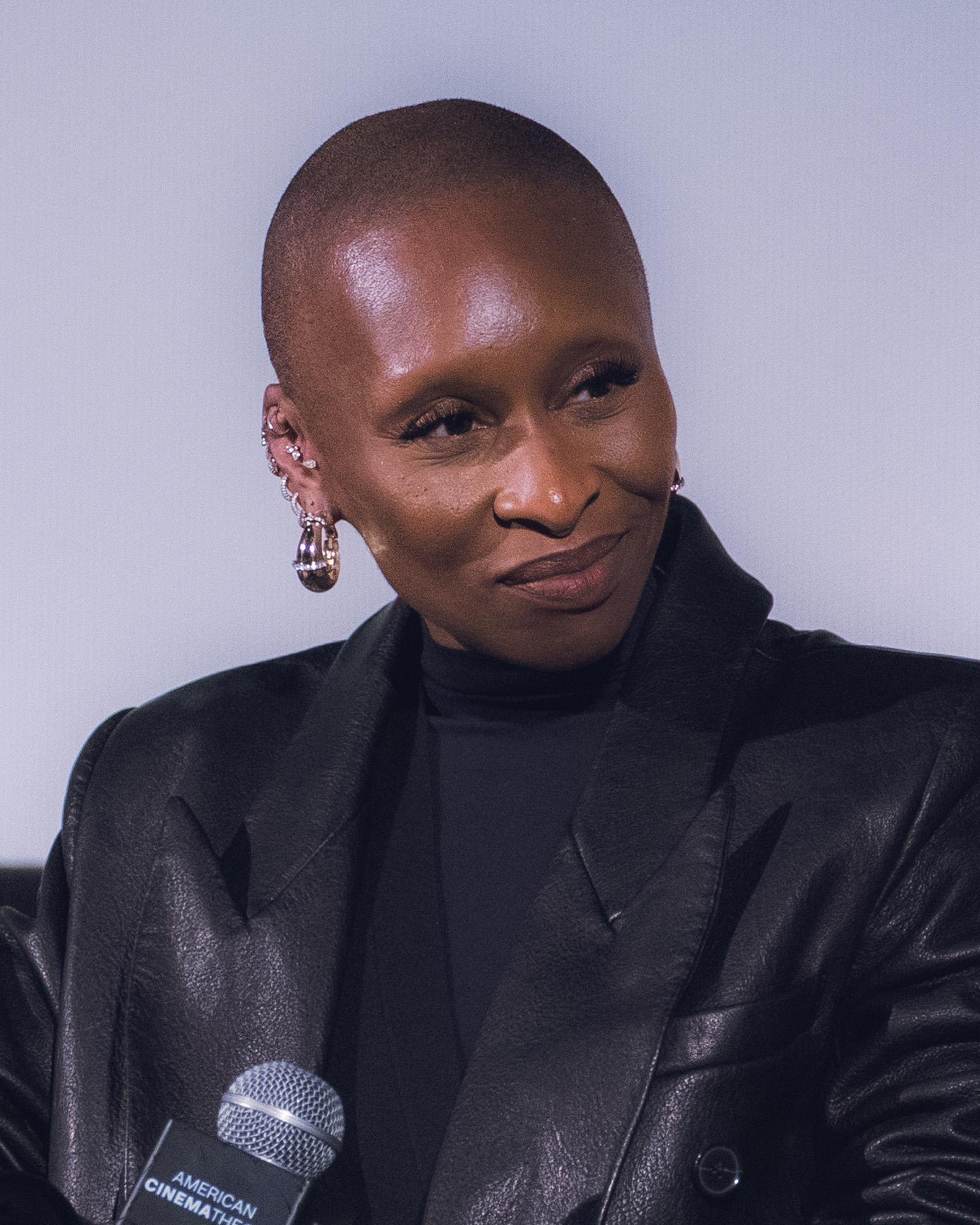
Cynthia Erivo guest stars in the episode.

The announcement of the series included that Natasha Lyonne would serve as the main lead actress. She was approached by Johnson about working on a procedural project together, with Lyonne as the lead character. As Johnson explained, the role was "completely cut to measure for her."

Due to the series' procedural aspects, the episodes feature several guest stars. Johnson was inspired by the amount of actors who guest starred on Columbo, wanting to deem each guest star as the star of the episode, which allowed them to attract many actors. The episode featured a guest appearance by Cynthia Erivo, who was announced to guest star in September 2024.

In February 2025, Erivo's role was revealed to be sextuplets. Erivo worked with the staff in creating the different character designs, personality and look, saying "I wanted you to be able to see the same face but see very different experiences in life. Because I think it added to the comedy, and it adds to how you feel about each of these women." On playing the antagonist Amber, Erivo added, "I think she thinks what she's doing is wonderful. That's where you have to have empathy for her, because you know it's absolutely horrific, terrible. But she's put so much energy into them, and she believes that she is just as good as Felicity and should have just as much praise for her work. She's really dedicated to all those spangles. She thinks they have just as much of a place in the world as her art. And it's so deeply sad. Like, poor little Amber."

=== Writing ===
Rian Johnson said that the writers came up with the idea of having Beatrix Hasp's hitmen pursue Charlie, as it would allow the character to move to different places across the country. He said, "I don't think the audience genuinely cares that there are people chasing her with guns. I think she moves to a different place each week and they go with it. So, for a lot of reasons, it made sense and it felt like a way to dig in deeper to the character."

=== Filming ===
The crew had to film the whole episode in 10 days, which was shorter than usual. Johnson commented, "It's not like we were using high, crazy camera technology. It was literally leaving the camera there, Cynthia would do half of her scene, she would go and change and she somehow kept it all in her head and was the loveliest person in the world."

== Critical reception ==
"The Game is a Foot" received highly positive reviews from critics. Noel Murray of The A.V. Club gave the three-episode premiere an "A–" grade and wrote, "Tip a cap to Erivo, who seems to be having a ball playing multiple Kazinskys—and sometimes playing a Kazinsky pretending to be another Kazinsky. In a scene where Charlie challenges the fake Felicity's broad southern accent, Erivo delivers a remarkable monologue, describing a hard childhood while changing accents pointedly throughout, illustrating Amber's new philosophy of life: “You must kill the old you to birth the new you.”"

Alan Sepinwall wrote "The punnily-titled “The Game Is A Foot” has fun with jokes about cheesy Nineties high-concept shows like Kid Cop Nights, where four of the five Cynthias Erivo starred as children. But it's a clever case of the show having its cake and eating it, too, since the idea of having Erivo play quintuplets — four who grew up together, one who's a total stranger — is itself the sort of gimmicky thing TV did a lot more of in decades past. Some of the quints are broader than others, but Erivo drills in effectively on the two main ones, and does a nice job playing Amber playing Felicity."

Amanda Whiting of Vulture gave the episode a four star rating out of five and wrote, "“The Game Is a Foot” features notable names like TV icon Jasmine Guy and Broadway star Jin Ha, but it's recent Oscar nominee Cynthia Erivo who emerges as the standout by virtue of the fact that she takes on five separate roles — seven, if you count one character impersonating two others — and makes them each her own." Elisa Guimarães of Collider wrote, ""The Game Is a Foot" isn't Poker Face trying to be a serious mystery, but instead, Poker Face trying to be a comedy. And, by God, does the show excel at that!"

Ben Sherlock of Screen Rant wrote, "Cynthia Erivo anchors the episode as identical sextuplets [sic], which not only showcases Erivo's incredible acting skills but also keeps you on your toes. Charlie never knows which sister she's talking to, so she could be giving crucial intel away to the wrong person. It's a perfect reintroduction to this show's particular brand of be-careful-who-you-trust twist-laden storytelling." Shay McBryde of Show Snob wrote, "Erivo puts on her best Eddie Murphy shoes in this role, giving each of the sisters a unique personality. No singing in this episode, unfortunately, but her acting is enough to keep you glued in. This episode really gives Erivo a chance to shine and show off her range, which she does beautifully."
