= Take Me Home (4 Christmas) =

Single by Olivia Rodrigo
- B-side: "Miss This Christmas"
- Released: November 5, 2026
- Genre: Christmas; pop rock
- Length: 2:57
- Label: Interscope
- Songwriters: Olivia Rodrigo; Daniel Nigro; Amy Allen
- Producer: Daniel Nigro

Olivia Rodrigo singles chronology
"Expectations" (2026)	"Take Me Home (4 Christmas)" (2026)

Music video
- "Take Me Home (4 Christmas)" on YouTube

"Take Me Home (4 Christmas)" (stylized in all lowercase) is a Christmas song by American singer-songwriter Olivia Rodrigo. It was released on November 5, 2026, through Interscope Records. She and Amy Allen co-wrote the track with its producer Daniel Nigro. Lyrically, "Take Me Home (4 Christmas)" explores the excitement and nervousness of spending the Christmas holidays with a loved one's family. Its release was accompanied by a music video starring Rodrigo, Cynthia Nixon, and Ben Marshall.

The song has reached the top 20 of the national charts for Germany, Ireland, and the United Kingdom. Upon release, "Take Me Home (4 Christmas)" was made available digitally and through physical editions, including a seven-inch vinyl and a cassette. A second Christmas song, "Miss this Christmas", was included as a B-side on the vinyl release.

== Production and release ==
On November 2, 2026, Olivia Rodrigo announced "Take Me Home (4 Christmas)" through her social media accounts, describing it as her first Christmas song. She also revealed the single's cover artwork, featuring herself wearing a Santa Claus hat and red lipstick. The song's release time was given as November 5, 2026, at 5:00 p.m. Pacific Time Zone.

The song is an homage to "Christmas Wrapping" by new wave band The Waitresses. Rodrigo sent a preview of the song to the band's founder and songwriter, Chris Butler. While Butler initially did not know who Rodrigo was, he went on to praise her career and appreciated how Rodrigo understood his songwriting.

The single received physical editions on seven-inch vinyl and cassette. These included "Miss this Christmas" as a B-side. On the same day the song came out, an accompanying music video premiered with Cynthia Nixon and Ben Marshall appearing with Rodrigo.

== Composition ==
"Take Me Home (4 Christmas)" runs for 2 minutes and 57 seconds. It is a Christmas and pop rock song with lyrics about feeling excited and nervous about spending the Christmas holidays with somebody one loves. Rodrigo, Amy Allen, and Dan Nigro co-wrote the song, with Nigro also handling the production. The song's melody and beat has been compared to Robbie Williams's 2012 song "Candy", leading to allegations of plagiarism. Williams rejected the allegations by calling them "complete bollocks" and said he "couldn't care less", explaining that inspiration is "how music works" and noting there was a difference between "protecting your work and treating every vaguely familiar sequence of notes as a winning lottery ticket".

== Track listing ==
Both tracks are stylized in all lowercase.

No.	Title	Length
1.	"Take Me Home (4 Christmas)"	2:57
2.	"Miss this Christmas"	2:32

== Personnel ==
Credits taken from Interscope Records.

=== "Take Me Home (4 Christmas)" ===
- Olivia Rodrigo – songwriting, lead vocals, background vocals
- Daniel Nigro – production, songwriting, engineering, background vocals, guitar, percussion, sleigh bells, organ, mixing
- Amy Allen – songwriting, background vocals
- Emily Williams – background vocals
- Saoirse Nigro – background vocals
- Sterling Laws – drums
- Ryan Linvill – bass
- Ariana Powell – guitar
- Mike Bozzi – mastering
- Jack Doutt – mastering assistance

=== "Miss This Christmas" ===
- Olivia Rodrigo – songwriting, lead vocals
- Daniel Nigro – production, songwriting, background vocals, piano, Wurlitzer, mixing
- MUSYCA Children's Choir (Note: The MUSYCA Children's Choir consists of Christina Lingle, Sadie Stallcup, Maya Shtangrud, Natasha Samuel, Natalie Shtangrud, and Romy Levy.) – choir vocals
- Misha Shtangrud – choir conducting
- Randy Merrill – mastering

== Charts ==
Chart performance
Chart (2026)	Peak position
Argentina Anglo Airplay (Monitor Latino)	15
Australia New Music Singles (ARIA)	11
Austria (Ö3 Austria Top 40)	67
Canada Hot 100 (Billboard)	44
Germany (GfK)	6
Global 200 (Billboard)	80
Ireland (IRMA)	13
Japan Hot Overseas (Billboard Japan)	3
Netherlands (Single Top 100)	45
New Zealand Hot Singles (RMNZ)	1
UK Singles (Official Charts)	8
US Billboard Hot 100	32
US Adult Contemporary (Billboard)	25
US Hot Rock & Alternative Songs (Billboard)	8

== Release history ==
Release dates and formats
Region	Date	Format(s)	Label	Ref.
Various	November 5, 2026	Download; streaming	Interscope	
Various	November 6, 2026	7" vinyl; cassette	Interscope	
