= The Hook (Poker Face) =

- Poker Face episode
- Episode no.: Season 1 Episode 10
- Directed by: Janicza Bravo
- Written by: Rian Johnson
- Cinematography by: Jason Presant
- Editing by: Glenn Garland
- Original release date: March 9, 2023
- Running time: 56 minutes

Guest appearances
- Ron Perlman as Sterling Frost Sr.; Simon Helberg as Luca Clark; Clea DuVall as Emily Cale; Benjamin Bratt as Cliff LeGrand; Rhea Perlman as Beatrix Hasp (voice only); Stephanie Hsu as "Mortimer Bernstein" (uncredited)

Episode chronology
← Previous "Escape from Shit Mountain"	Next → "The Game Is a Foot"

"The Hook" is the tenth episode and first season finale of the American murder mystery comedy-drama television series Poker Face. The episode was written by series creator Rian Johnson and directed by Janicza Bravo. It was released on Peacock on March 9, 2023.

The series follows Charlie Cale, a woman with the ability to detect if people are lying; after exposing a murder plot at a casino, she is now on the run from the owner's enforcer Cliff LeGrand. This episode follows Charlie, having been found by Cliff, who takes her to Atlantic City to see the casino owner Sterling Frost Sr. to settle her debts.

The episode received critical acclaim, with critics praising the directing, writing, performances, tension, humor and closure of storylines.

== Plot ==
At the coroner's office in Laughlin, Nevada, Sterling Frost Sr. (Ron Perlman) has just seen the corpse of his son. He calls Charlie (Natasha Lyonne), informing her he will use every resource at his disposal to track her down. (Note: Previously depicted from her point of view in "Dead Man's Hand".) He then assigns Cliff (Benjamin Bratt) to find her, telling him that once he does he must call him to ask "how deep to dig the hole". (Note: The same phrase he used when calling him at the end of "Escape from Shit Mountain".)

After over a year of pursuing Charlie, Cliff finally tracks her down while she is hospitalized in Denver. Unexpectedly, Frost tells him to wait until she recovers before taking her to him, much to Cliff's frustration. Two months later, Charlie is released and informed that her bills have been paid by a private party. As she steps outside, she finds Cliff waiting for her and despondently goes with him. During the road trip, Charlie asks Cliff if he was the one who killed her friend Natalie; he silently confirms. Stopping the car, he tempts her into taking out a revolver in his glovebox, but she refuses to shoot. Cliff drives her to Atlantic City, New Jersey, where Charlie meets Frost at a casino hotel.

Charlie is surprised to find that Frost no longer blames her for his son's death. He reveals why he had Cliff pursue her: since he wiretapped his casinos, he recorded a conversation between his son and Beatrix Hasp, a rival crime boss and the owner of the casino they are currently in. Against Frost's wishes, his son planned to go into business with Hasp, who is in the mob. Frost offers $500,000 and freedom if Charlie sits with him during the meeting to detect any possible lie. Charlie is delighted at the opportunity, and Frost complements the gesture with a gift. They are surprised, however, when she pulls a revolver from the box. As she does so, the lights go out and Frost is shot dead. Charlie flees while Cliff calls for security.

In a flashback, it is revealed that Cliff's patience and his loyalty towards Frost had run out during his pursuit of Charlie, and he conspired with Hasp to kill Frost. To Cliff's delight, Hasp's crime family planned to use Charlie as a scapegoat to hide their involvement, which, if known, would threaten the delicate peace with the other families. Cliff retrieved the revolver Charlie touched from his car and replaced the content of Frost's gift box (her old name tag) with a similar revolver. During their conversation at the casino, Cliff used a remote control to turn off the lights and kill Frost with the revolver covered with Charlie's fingerprints, which he then swapped with the revolver Charlie dropped for the FBI to find.

Hiding in the hotel, Charlie calls FBI Agent Luca Clark (Simon Helberg). (Note: Previously seen in "Time of the Monkey".) Luca has been assigned to lead the murder case, having been promoted after Charlie supplied him with the information regarding Kazimir Caine. While Luca will not pursue Charlie, he advises her to leave town. She manages to escape by joining a bachelorette's party bus. She then reaches the home of her estranged sister, Emily (Clea DuVall). Emily gives Charlie the keys to their father's boat, and while she admits she knows her sister is a good person at heart, she also says she has left no place for her and her niece to be a part of the life she chose for herself.

Charlie is unable to use the boat due to a massive hole in the hull. With no other option, she calls Cliff for help, unaware of his role in Frost's death. He tells her to meet him on his boat, where he plans to deliver her to the authorities. Coincidentally being not that far away, Charlie comes along before they arrive. She discusses possible scenarios with Cliff, who carefully avoids lying by indirectly answering her questions. As he stalls her by pretending to start up the boat, Charlie finds blacklight-reactive poker chips, which were used to mark Frost during the blackout. She instantly realizes what happened just as police sirens are heard.

Charlie fights off Cliff, hitting him in the eye with a penis-shaped ring that she received from the bachelorette's party, and escapes by jumping into the water. Cliff, now partially blind, is met by an FBI team led by Luca, who recovered an incriminating tape where Frost's son ordered Cliff to kill Natalie and her husband; he is arrested. A while later, Luca drives Charlie's Plymouth Barracuda to a diner where they reunite. With Cliff's testimony, Charlie's name has been cleared while the authorities look for Hasp. He once again offers her a job at the FBI, but she declines, leaving Luca to settle the diner's bill.

Once Charlie leaves the diner, she is called by Hasp (Rhea Perlman), who wants revenge after Charlie's actions ruined her plans and ignited a war in the criminal underworld. She offers her a deal: Charlie can work for the mob, or she will be hunted down. Charlie chooses the latter and destroys her phone, ready to take on the road again.

== Production ==
=== Development ===
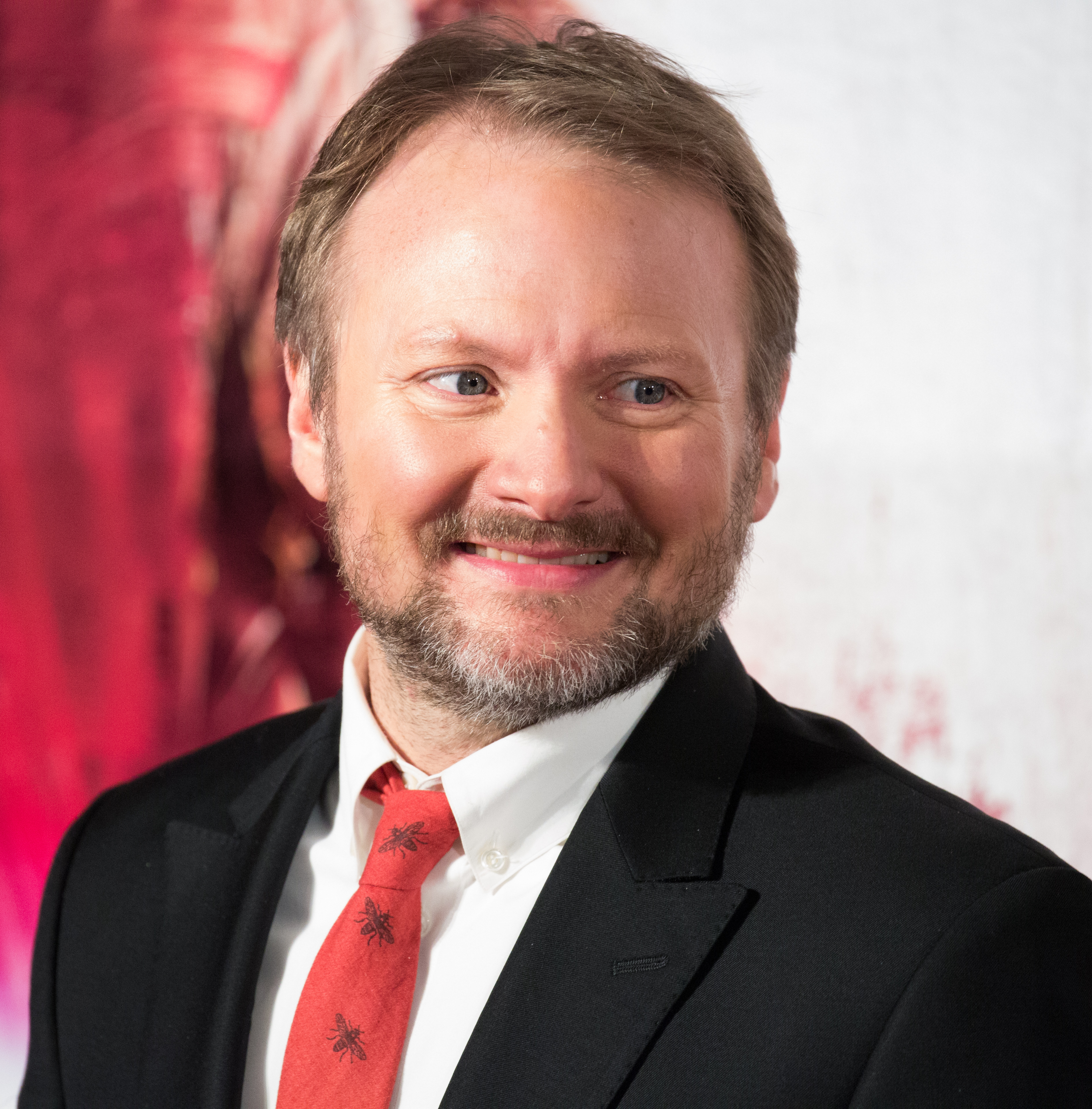
Series creator Rian Johnson wrote the episode.

The series was announced in March 2021, with Rian Johnson serving as creator, writer, director and executive producer. Johnson stated that the series would delve into "the type of fun, character driven, case-of-the-week mystery goodness I grew up watching." The episode was directed by Janicza Bravo, while series creator Rian Johnson wrote it. This was Bravo's first directing credit, and Johnson's second writing credit for the show.

=== Casting ===
The announcement of the series included that Natasha Lyonne would serve as the main lead actress. She was approached by Johnson about working on a procedural project together, with Lyonne as the lead character. As Johnson explained, the role was "completely cut to measure for her." Benjamin Bratt also joined the series in the recurring role of Cliff, whose character chases Charlie after she ran away from the casino in the first episode.

Due to the series' procedural aspects, the episodes feature several guest stars. Johnson was inspired by the amount of actors who guest starred on Columbo, wanting to deem each guest star as the star of the episode, which allowed them to attract many actors. The episode featured appearances by Simon Helberg, Ron Perlman, Clea DuVall, and Rhea Perlman, who were announced to guest star in June, August and October 2022, respectively. Ron Perlman previously appeared in "Dead Man's Hand" in a voice cameo at the end of the episode, while Simon Helberg reprised his role from "Time of the Monkey".

=== Writing ===
The episode deviates from previous episodes; instead of the howcatchem structure, it was used to move forward with the Frost storyline. Rian Johnson compared it to Quantum Leap, which often had episodes that could move the storyline. He said, "I don't think I could have ended the season without giving it some big season ending. It felt really good to do something that broke the mold and felt like a cap in a satisfying way, which means calling back to the beginning."

Throughout the episode, there are many easter eggs revolving around "hooks". These include the episode's title, Cliff reciting the song "Hook" by Blues Traveler, and Hook playing when Charlie visited Emily. Johnson explained that it means "the format of the show, and the addictive little hooks in life that pull us into situations."

The episode introduced Charlie's sister, Emily, played by Clea DuVall. The writers wanted to explore Charlie's past without delving too much. Co-showrunner Lilla Zuckerman explained, "we arrived at this idea of her having a scene with her sister while we were breaking the rest of the season, and I think it was smart for us to save it for the finale." Charlie's scenes with Emily were inspired by Inside Llewyn Davis, where "you don't necessarily understand all of the old wounds between these people — you just get a little peek."

Charlie choosing to go on the run again was described as a "bittersweet" ending by co-showrunner Nora Zuckerman, who explained, "She is so aware of who she is and what her problems are. [...] But she is confident as she leaves the finale that she will be OK. Maybe we're not so sure, but Charlie is. So, I think we want to go on the ride with her."

== Critical reception ==
"The Hook" received critical acclaim. Saloni Gajjar of The A.V. Club gave the episode an "A–" grade and wrote, "For the most part, Rian Johnson's Peacock drama has evolved into a crackerjack hit centered around Charlie's lie-sniffing gimmick. The show has delivered thrilling murder mysteries, fascinating characters played by notable stars, and the slowest of slow reveals about Charlie's history. The first season wraps on a high note by finally pulling on that last thread and introducing Charlie's estranged sister, Emily, played by Clea DuVall. It's a proper BIAC reunion."

Alan Sepinwall of Rolling Stone wrote, "'The Hook' so expertly bottled that delicate balance of comedy, drama, and suspense that has made this show so wonderful. Some episodes this season trended more towards silliness, some more towards danger, and some — this one included — had it all in spades. It's an hour where Charlie can be in genuine fear for her life, while also escaping peril for the moment by sneaking aboard a party bus full of drunken bridesmaids."

Amanda Whiting of Vulture gave the episode a 4 star rating out of 5 and wrote, "Personally, I like it this way. Poker Face was billed as a 'ten-part mystery series', but the door has been left open for a little more Charlie to come. Perhaps Johnson and Natasha Lyonne will even take a page from Columbo's book, a show that between 1990 and 2003 put out another 14 episodes, sometimes with years between them. Maybe Charlie is a character we'll check in on from time to time over the next decade just to prove that she's still out there, doing good while always claiming to be the kind of person who does the least."

Miles Surrey of The Ringer gave the episode a 4 star rating out of 5 and wrote, "Poker Face can take solace in the fact that its first season went out with a winning hand." Spencer Kornhaber of The Atlantic wrote, "As this week's season finale culminated with shots of a highway cutting through amber-toned fields, it inspired a counterintuitive feeling: hope in the American dream. The brutality contained in Poker Face's 10 episodes is outweighed by humor, humanism, intelligence, and, perhaps most crucially, optimism."

=== Accolades ===
TVLine named Natasha Lyonne as the "Performer of the Week" for the week of March 11, 2023, for her performance in the episode. The site wrote, "In the end, Charlie caught the bad guy, of course — using an, um, unusual ring to subdue Cliff — and went back on the run, this time with a different casino boss vowing to track her down. (And we can't wait to see Lyonne tangle with Rhea Perlman in Season 2.) But for now, let's enjoy what Lyonne has given us this season: an instantly memorable TV character with an endless supply of sassy one-liners and a few hidden depths still left to explore."
