= UCB =

UCB may stand for:

== Banking ==
- UCB Home Loans, a mortgage lender in the UK
- Uganda Commercial Bank, a former state-owned bank in Uganda
- United Carolina Bank, a former bank based in North Carolina, USA
- Union Commercial Bank, former name of Mauritius Commercial Bank
- United Commercial Bank Ltd, a private bank in Bangladesh
- United Community Bank, based in South Carolina, USA

== Education ==
=== Universities ===
- University of California, Berkeley, in the U.S. state of California
- Umwelt-Campus Birkenfeld, a branch of the Trier University of Applied Sciences in the German state of Rhineland-Palatinate
- Universidad Central de Bayamón, a private Catholic university in the U.S. territory of Puerto Rico
- Universidade Católica de Brasília, a private Catholic university in Brazil
- University College of Bahrain, in Saar, Bahrain
- University College, Bangor, predecessor to Bangor University, in Wales, United Kingdom
- University College of Bangor, a campus of the University of Maine at Augusta, in the U.S. state of Maine
- University College Birmingham, in England, United Kingdom
- University College at Buckingham, predecessor to University of Buckingham, in England, United Kingdom
- University of Colorado Boulder, in the U.S. state of Colorado

=== Other schools ===
- Uva College, Badulla, a public boys school in Sri Lanka

== Art, entertainment, and media ==
- Upright Citizens Brigade, a US comedy group
- United Christian Broadcasters, an international broadcasting organisation

== Other uses ==
- UCB (company), a global biopharmaceutical manufacturer
- Ulanqab Jining Airport, IATA code UCB
- Unconjugated Bilirubin, in clinical biochemistry, the yellow breakdown product of normal heme catabolism
- Union of Burkinabé Communists, a political party in Burkina Faso in the 1980s
- Unit Control Block, in computing, an area of memory in IBM's z/OS
- United Cricket Board of South Africa, a former name of the governing body of cricket in South Africa
