= The Taste of Human Blood =

- Poker Face episode
- Episode no.: Season 2 Episode 4
- Directed by: Lucky McKee
- Written by: Wyatt Cain
- Cinematography by: Christine Ng
- Editing by: Glenn Garland
- Original air date: May 15, 2025
- Running time: 51 minutes

Guest appearances
- Gaby Hoffmann as Fran Lamont; Kumail Nanjiani as Joseph "Gator Joe" Pilson; Steve Buscemi as Good Buddy (voice only); Shiloh Fernandez as Hutch; Ben Marshall as Rusty; John Sayles as Chief Hal Pendleton; Matt Passmore as himself

Episode chronology
← Previous "Whack-A-Mole"	Next → "Hometown Hero"

"The Taste of Human Blood" is the fourth episode of the second season of the American murder mystery comedy-drama television series Poker Face. It is the fourteenth overall episode of the series and was written by producer Wyatt Cain, and directed by Lucky McKee. It was released on Peacock on May 15, 2025.

The series follows Charlie Cale, a woman with the ability to detect if people are lying, who is now embarking on a fresh start after criminal boss Beatrix Hasp cancels a hit on her. In the episode, Charlie stays in Florida to help volunteers from an alligator sanctuary to release an exploited alligator from her social media-obsessed owner. When the gator is accused of killing the owner, Charlie sets out to find the truth.

The episode received generally positive reviews from critics, who praised its humor and performances, although some were mixed over the episode's tone and plot conveniences.

== Plot ==
In 2019, Florida police officer Fran LaMont (Gaby Hoffmann) is informed by Chief Hal Pendleton (John Sayles) that she has been nominated for Cop of the Year at the annual Florida Panhandle Cop Awards, or "FlopaCopa". Fran is indifferent, but Chief Hal encourages her to attend the ceremony, as it would benefit the precinct. At the ceremony, hosted by Matt Passmore, Fran loses the award to Officer Joseph Pilson (Kumail Nanjiani), who adopted a baby alligator rescued from a meth dealer.

Six years later, Joe has won the same award in all the ceremonies since and grown popular on social media as "Gator Joe", while Fran has grown increasingly frustrated by her many losses. Before the upcoming ceremony, Fran discovers that Joe has won again. Joe walks in to find her crying and gloats over his many victories. Incensed, Fran slips cisapride into Joe's power juice to induce severe diarrhea during the ceremony, but Joe collapses and dies from an overdose. She releases his alligator Daisy, giving her crystal meth to get her to maul Joe's corpse. Soon afterwards, the police find his body.

A few days prior, Charlie (Natasha Lyonne) is debating where to go next now that she is no longer on the run. Over CB radio, she talks with a man known as "Good Buddy" (Steve Buscemi), who motivates her to find a new "beginning" for her life. At an alligator sanctuary, she befriends one of the workers, Hutch (Shiloh Fernandez), who convinces Charlie to help his group liberate animals like Daisy. They infiltrate FlopaCopa and send Charlie to get Daisy from Joe's room. Unable to move her, Charlie leaves to steal Oreos from a storage room but returns to find Daisy gone. An officer begins screaming that Daisy killed Joe.

Police authorities surround the bathroom and plan to kill Daisy. A suspicious Charlie finds a trail of Oreos on the floor and the lock on the cage untied, indicating human involvement. Hutch's team leaves, since Daisy has tasted human blood and can no longer be saved. Fran learns that Joe posted a TikTok of their last conversation in the trophy room and deduces he had cameras in his glasses, which were swallowed by Daisy. When the police enter the room, they find that Daisy has escaped through the vents. Consulting pictures from the photo op with many bags of meth, Charlie realizes Daisy was drugged. She locates Daisy in the storage room eating Oreos. Bursting in, Fran agrees to help sneak Daisy out of the building.

While driving to a swamp, Charlie realizes that Fran is lying and stops her before she can shoot Daisy. Charlie remarks that she saw Joe running to the bathroom due to laxatives, which makes no sense as he knew he was going to win the award in a few minutes. She tells Fran to look in Daisy's eyes and understand her gentle nature. They free Daisy, who defecates the glasses. Fran confesses her crime to Chief Hal, who decides to bury it as it is "the most Florida Man shit of all time" and no judge would believe it. Nonetheless, Fran resigns to work at the gator sanctuary. Before leaving, Charlie exchanges one last look with Daisy, though she flees when Daisy appears to be drawn to her blood.

== Production ==
=== Development ===
The series was announced in March 2021, with Rian Johnson serving as creator, writer, director and executive producer. Johnson stated that the series would delve into "the type of fun, character driven, case-of-the-week mystery goodness I grew up watching." The episode was written by producer Wyatt Cain, and directed by Lucky McKee. This was Cain's fourth writing credit, and McKee's second directing credit for the show.

=== Casting ===
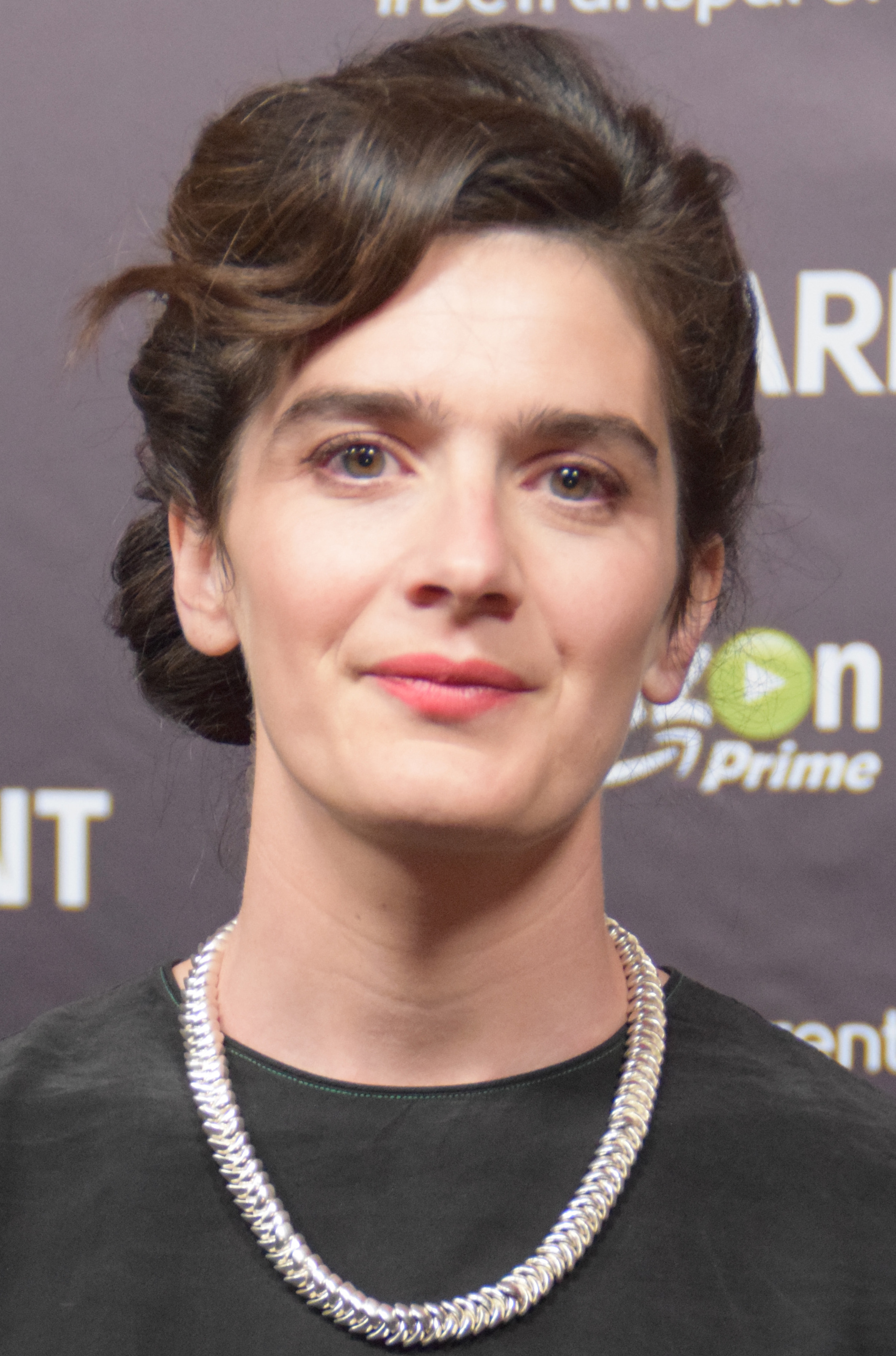
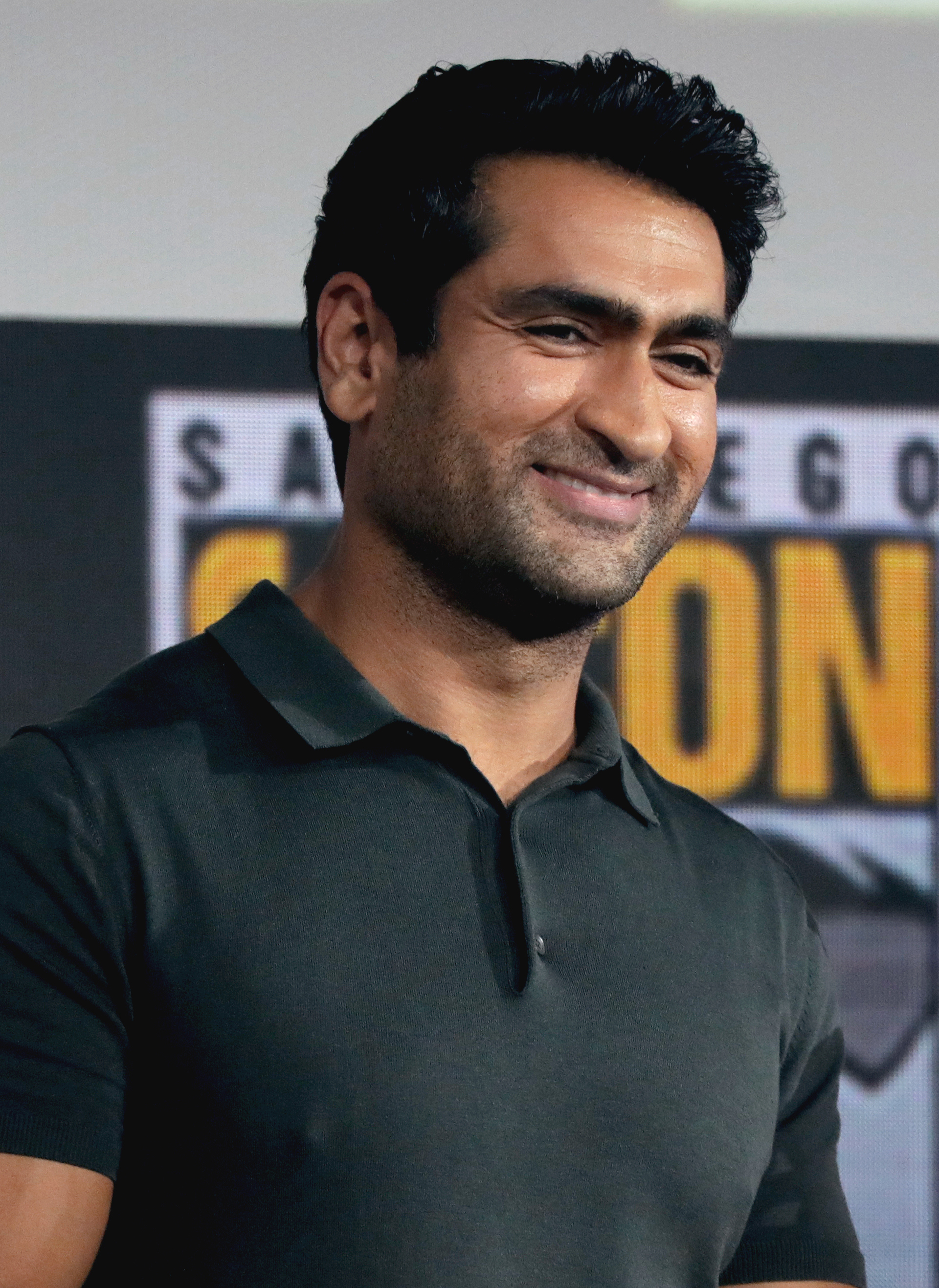
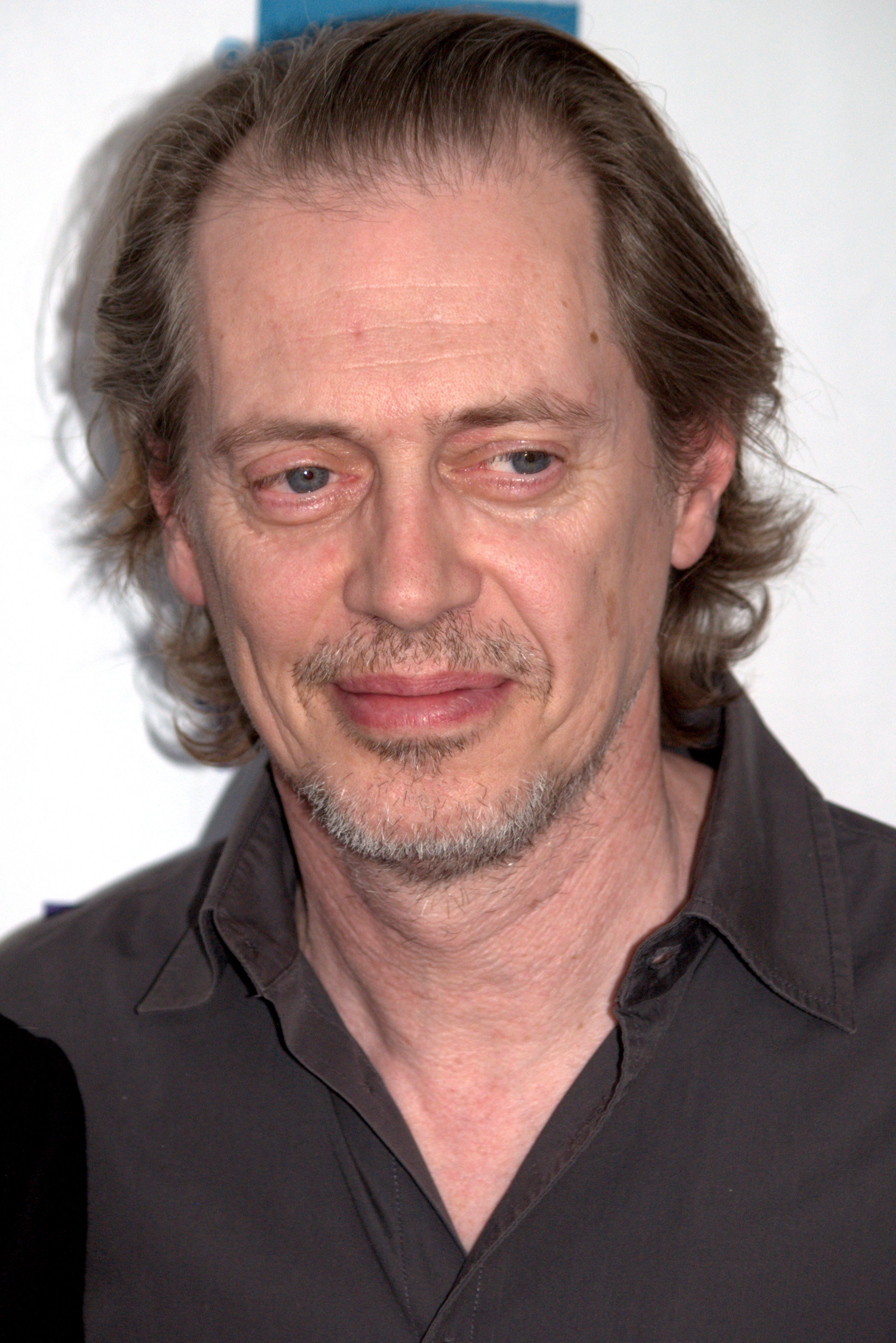
Gaby Hoffmann, Kumail Nanjiani and Steve Buscemi guest star in the episode.

The announcement of the series included that Natasha Lyonne would serve as the main lead actress. She was approached by Johnson about working on a procedural project together, with Lyonne as the lead character. As Johnson explained, the role was "completely cut to measure for her."

Due to the series' procedural aspects, the episodes feature several guest stars. Johnson was inspired by the amount of actors who guest starred on Columbo, wanting to deem each guest star as the star of the episode, which allowed them to attract many actors. The episode featured guest appearances by Kumail Nanjiani and Gaby Hoffmann, who were announced to guest star in July 2024. The episode also includes an off-screen guest appearance by Steve Buscemi, who voices the character "Good Buddy" on the radio. Lyone and Buscemi previously worked on the latter's directed-film Animal Factory, although Lyonne had her scene cut from the film. Originally, Buscemi was approached to direct an episode for the second season; while he had scheduling conflicts, he agreed to voice "Good Buddy" on the episode. Showrunner Tony Tost said that the character was inspired by the films Smokey and the Bandit and Every Which Way but Loose, and Rian Johnson suggested that the casting should "go where we're not expecting, with Steve Buscemi, kind of a consummate New Yorker, as this trucker."

== Critical reception ==
"The Taste of Human Blood" received generally positive reviews from critics. Noel Murray of The A.V. Club gave the episode a "B" grade and wrote, "In some ways, this episode seems designed as a kind of reflective pause, as Poker Face readjusts its premise from “fugitive Charlie” to “free-spirit Charlie.” As she heads into the next phase of her life, maybe she'll see Fran’s story as a cautionary tale. Charlie has been used to not wanting recognition. Maybe she sees now that staying incognito is still the best way to live, even if she doesn't have to. It's all too easy for just a little bit of hunger for fame to turn into a ravenous craving."

Alan Sepinwall wrote, "much of the episode ultimately spins around Charlie and then Fran having some kind of cosmic vision while staring into the gator's eyes. Is it strange? Yes. Is it silly? Absolutely. Would I want Poker Face to do this kind of thing every week? Nope. But as an odd change of pace outing, I found it pretty delightful." Elisa Guimarães of Collider wrote, ""The Taste of Human Blood" mostly throws away the chance to start developing Charlie's character, which was more than welcome after the end of "Whack-a-Mole." With no one on her tail, Charlie should be striving to find out who she is and what she truly wants from life, which the script tells us she is doing through her own mouth. However, when it comes time to show it, Cain just gets her on the radio with a random guy who tells her that life is all about the journey. Charlie doesn't get any closer to self-realization. She just keeps on floating around from one town to the other, from one episode to the other. Let's hope this changes as the season progresses."

Louis Peitzman of Vulture gave the episode a 2 star rating out of 5 and wrote, "For my part, I've had no problem embracing the occasional wackiness and credulity-straining thanks to the top-tier writing, direction, and performances. “The Taste of Human Blood,” however, has pushed me past my breaking point. For the first time, Poker Face has crossed the line into “too goofy” territory." Melody McCune of Telltale TV gave the episode a 3.5 star rating out of 5 and wrote, "“The Taste of Human Blood” gets kooky and quirky, defends alligators, and sees Charlie thrive in the aftermath of the mob storyline. It's not perfect, but few things are. Here's hoping our modern-day Columbo's travels take her to someplace safer. Why not solve a “safe” murder next time, sans dinosaur-like creatures?"

Ben Sherlock of Screen Rant wrote, "“The Taste of Human Blood” might have a much sillier setup than the average Poker Face episode — the whole thing is basically a lavish, hour-long Florida Man meme — but its execution is just as smart." Shay McBryde of Show Snob wrote, "As far as killers go in this series, this was not a truly exciting one. Though, if I were Cale, I would stop cornering people and accusing them of murder. She may have been gator bait if it wasn’t for Daisy protecting her. The deed is completed nonetheless."
