= Ben Marshall (comedian) =

American comedian, writer and actor (born 1995)

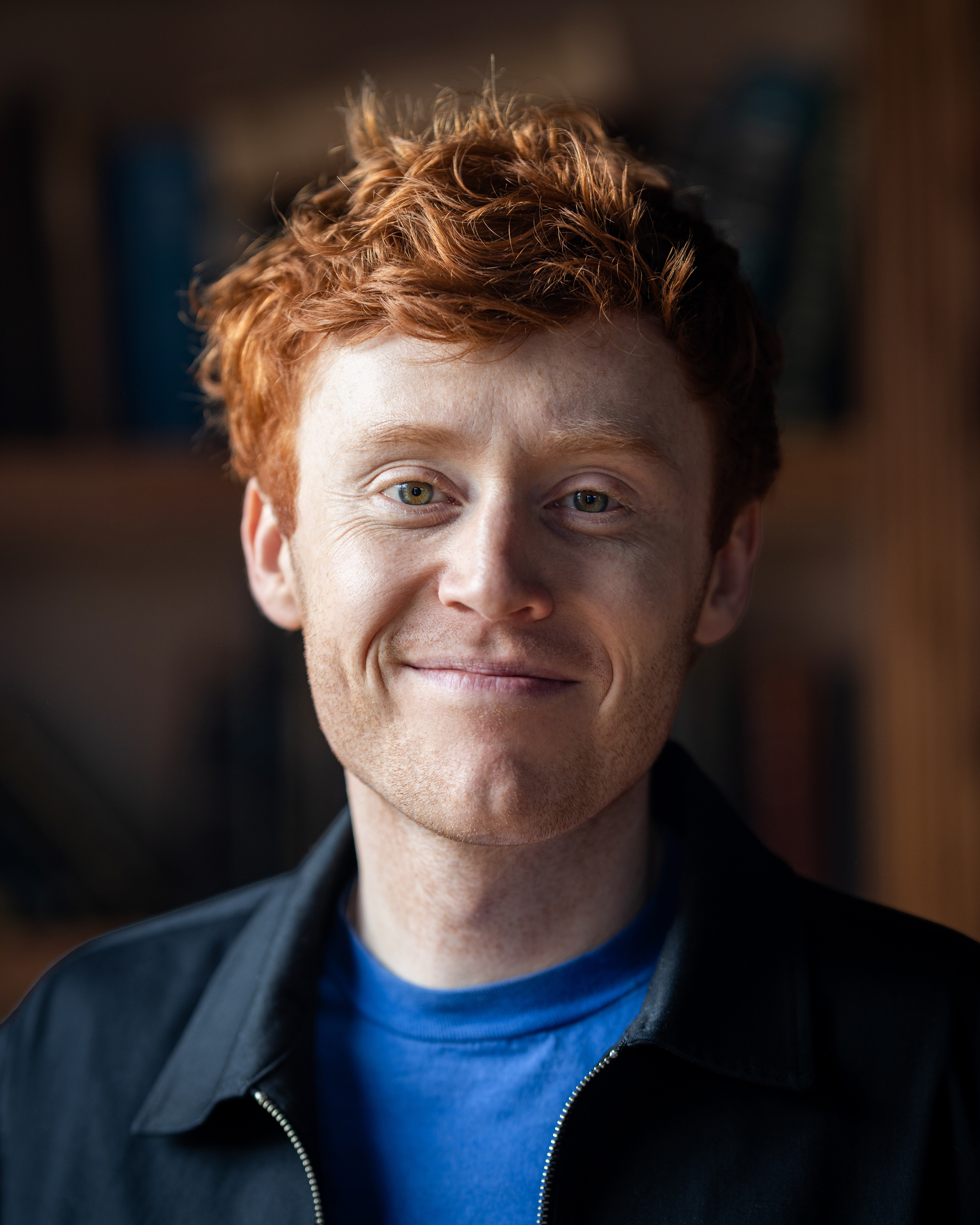
- Marshall in 2025
- Born: May 1, 1995 (age 31); Savannah, Georgia, U.S.
- Education: New York University (BFA)
- Occupations: Actor; comedian; writer
- Years active: 2017–present

Ben Marshall (born May 1, 1995) is an American comedian, writer, and actor. He is best known for his work with the comedy trio Please Don't Destroy, particularly for its shorts created for Saturday Night Live (SNL). Marshall originally joined SNL as a writer in 2021 before becoming a full-time cast member in 2025.

== Early life ==
Marshall was born and raised in Savannah, Georgia, where he attended Savannah Arts Academy, a public high school for the performing and visual arts. He earned a bachelor of fine arts degree from New York University's Tisch School of the Arts in 2017. At NYU, he was involved in the Hammerkatz sketch comedy and Astor Place Riots stand-up comedy groups. Prior to SNL, he worked as an after-school counselor at the 14th Street YMHA while pursuing comedy.

== Career ==
Marshall co-founded the comedy group Please Don't Destroy in 2017 alongside John Higgins and Martin Herlihy while the three were students at New York University. The troupe performed monthly comedy shows and appeared at the 2018 New York Comedy Festival. They also produced sketch videos posted on YouTube and, during the COVID-19 pandemic, began creating short-form videos for TikTok and Twitter (now X).

In 2021, the trio was hired as writers for the 47th season of Saturday Night Live (SNL) to produce prerecorded sketch videos. Please Don't Destroy debuted on SNL on October 9, 2021, with the sketch Hard Seltzer. In 2023, the group did a 26-date live comedy tour of the United States. The same year, they wrote and starred in Please Don't Destroy: The Treasure of Foggy Mountain, a comedy film that follows three friends as they search for hidden treasure.

In June 2025, Marshall joined the cast of the Kevin Hart-led Netflix comedy film 72 Hours, which was released in the summer of 2026. He later guest-starred in an episode of season two of Poker Face. On September 2, 2025, Marshall was announced as a new featured player on SNL, promoted from writer/short maker to full-time cast member.

In June 2026, Marshall was announced to have a guest appearance in season 2 of Adults. In November 2026, Marshall appeared in the music video for Olivia Rodrigo's "Take Me Home (4 Christmas)" in the role of her boyfriend. He previously acted alongside Rodrigo when she hosted SNL earlier in 2026.

== Filmography ==
=== Film ===
Key
†	Denotes films that have not yet been released

Year	Title	Role	Notes
2023	Please Don't Destroy: The Treasure of Foggy Mountain	Ben	Also co-writer
2026	72 Hours	Hunter	
2026	One Night Only	Patrick Brunson	

=== Television ===
Year	Title	Role	Notes
2017	The Tonight Show Starring Jimmy Fallon	Lipstick model	Episode: "Drew Barrymore/ Tom Brokaw/Parquet Courts
2017	Personal Business	Ben	8 episodes; Also, writer
2017	Above Average Presents	Groomsman/ Ben/ Scott Mulcher	5 episodes; Also, writer
2021	The Basics	Huge Jacked Man 2	Episode: "Finale"
2021–present	Saturday Night Live	Himself, various characters	Writer, appeared in Please Don't Destroy sketches (2021–2025); cast member (2025–present)
2025	Abolish Everything	Himself	Panelist
2025	Poker Face	Rusty	Episode: "The Taste of Human Blood"
2026	Adults	Colin	Episode: "Room Swap" (guest appearance)

=== Music videos ===
Year	Title	Artist	Role	Ref.
2026	"Take Me Home (4 Christmas)"	Olivia Rodrigo	Boyfriend	

== See also ==
- List of NYU Tisch School of the Arts people
