= Savannah Arts Academy =

Performing and visual arts school in Savannah, Georgia, United States

Location
- 500 Washington Avenue; Savannah, Georgia 31405; United States; 32°02′46″N 81°05′34″W

Information
- Type: Magnet, public high school
- Established: 1998 (28 years ago)
- CEEB code: 112696
- Principal: Anna Belue
- Staff: 63.10 (FTE)
- Grades: 9-12
- Enrollment: 853 (2023-2024)
- Student to teacher ratio: 13.52
- Colors: Black, silver, white, hot pink
- Mascot: Panther
- Website: saa.sccpss.com

Savannah Arts Academy (SAA) is the first dedicated performing and visual arts school in Savannah, Georgia, United States. It is part of the Savannah-Chatham County Public Schools. Savannah Arts Academy was granted charter school status and the former Savannah High School building in July 1998, and opened in August of the same year with 397 students enrolled.

As of 2023, the school is ranked the #7 high school in Georgia, and #276 high school nationally, ranked by U.S. News & World Report.

== History ==
The Savannah Arts Academy building is located on a site that was originally planned as a luxury tourist hotel called the Hotel Georgia. The Works Progress Administration, in the midst of the Great Depression, expressed interest in the site for use as the new Savannah High School, which was dedicated on June 15, 1937. After 61 years on Washington Avenue, Savannah High School classes were moved to a new building on Pennsylvania Avenue, leaving the structure available for the newly formed Savannah Arts Academy for the school year beginning August 1998.

=== Awards and recognition ===
During the 2006–07 school year, Savannah Arts Academy was recognized with the Blue Ribbon School Award of Excellence by the United States Department of Education. "The Blue Ribbon award is given only to schools that reach the top 10 percent of their state's testing scores over several years or show significant gains in student achievement." Savannah Arts currently ranks #1 in the Savannah-Chatham County Public School District, ranks #14 in Georgia for public high schools, and ranks in the top 400's in the United States, competing with 24,000 other public high schools.

== Student activities ==
=== Savannah Arts Fashion Show ===
Formerly known as Junk 2 Funk, the SAA Fashion Show is an annual show put on by the visual arts and theater departments. Prior to the COVID-19 pandemic, Junk 2 Funk consisted of four shows in January; however, in 2021, there were no performances open to the public, and in 2022, one public show was performed as well as one school show. In 2023, the show was performed at the Alee Shriners Temple of Savannah with the theme Tabula Rasa. In 2024, the show was held in the school's theater with a Metaphysical Aquatica theme and was shown three times to the public.

=== Film and Media Festival ===
The SAA Film and Media Festival is an annual showing of the Savannah Art's film department's student work. Awards for different categories of filmmaking are handed out to select students.

== Notable alumni ==
Name	Class year	Notability	Reference(s)
Ligel Lambert	2000	Visual artist	
Cheryl Haworth	2001	Olympic weightlifter	
Ben Marshall	2013	Comedian	
