= A New Lease on Death =

- Poker Face episode
- Episode no.: Season 2 Episode 9
- Directed by: Adamma Ebo
- Written by: Tea Ho; Wyatt Cain
- Cinematography by: Christine Ng
- Editing by: Shaheed Qaasim
- Original air date: June 19, 2025
- Running time: 47 minutes

Guest appearances
- Alia Shawkat as Amelia Peek; Lauren Tom as Anne Saint Marie; Patti Harrison as Alex; Steve Buscemi as Good Buddy (voice only); David Alan Grier as Otto; Myra Lucretia Taylor as Noreen; Pej Vahdat as Abdul

Episode chronology
← Previous "The Sleazy Georgian"	Next → "The Big Pump"

"A New Lease on Death" is the ninth episode of the second season of the American murder mystery comedy-drama television series Poker Face. It is the nineteenth overall episode of the series and was written by executive story editor Tea Ho and producer Wyatt Cain, and directed by Adamma Ebo. It was released on Peacock on June 19, 2025.

The series follows Charlie Cale, a woman with the ability to detect if people are lying, who is now embarking on a fresh start after criminal boss Beatrix Hasp cancels a hit on her. In the episode, Charlie moves in to an apartment in Brooklyn to take care of a friend's apartment, when she finds that one of the tenants died in a freak accident.

The episode received positive reviews from critics, who praised the performances and tone, although some considered the episode's themes as less interesting than previous episodes.

== Plot ==
Maddy Saint Marie (Awkwafina) lives with her grandmother Anne (Lauren Tom) in Brooklyn. Anne meets and begins dating a younger woman named Kate Forster (Alia Shawkat), and two weeks later Kate moves in with them.

Maddy asks her friend Ricardo to investigate Kate and discovers she is Amelia Peek, a felon with three arrest warrants in Minnesota. Realizing that "Kate" is only dating Anne to take advantage of their rent-controlled apartment, Maddy warns her to leave, or she will report her to the authorities. Amelia asks for one last day with Anne to say goodbye, which Maddy accepts. Instead, Amelia orchestrates an accident in the laundry room, setting up a bottle of bleach to fall into a puddle of descaler while Maddy is locked in the room, which kills her with the resulting chlorine gas.

A few weeks earlier, Charlie moves into Good Buddy (Steve Buscemi)'s apartment in the same building. She avoids superintendent Otto (David Alan Grier), who does not allow subletters. While picking up groceries, she runs into "Kate", identifying her as a liar trying to scam refunds from the store owner, Abdul. She meets Maddy when a defective lock traps her in the laundry room, then befriends both her and Anne.

After learning of Maddy's death, Charlie comes to visit a devastated Anne and is surprised to see "Kate" in the apartment, claiming that she and Anne will soon be engaged. When Charlie investigates the laundry room, Otto tells her that he repaired the door prior to Maddy's death and that the current lock on the door is not the one he installed. Charlie asks Abdul who bought the new lock, and he tells her it was the woman who asks for refunds on food.

Amelia threatens Ricardo into staying silent and pulls the fire alarm to prevent Charlie from questioning him. When she learns that Anne wants to move out of the building, due to the painful reminders of Maddy, a desperate Amelia decides she must marry Anne immediately to get control of the apartment. When Amelia returns with the marriage paperwork, she finds Charlie talking with Anne. While Anne is out of the room, Amelia pushes Charlie out a window. However, Charlie lands safely on an air cushion that she asked a firefighter to set up for her. Anne and her lawyer have recorded the whole incident, leading to Amelia's arrest. As Anne packs her belongings, she gives Charlie a poetry book to thank her for her help.

== Production ==
=== Development ===
The series was announced in March 2021, with Rian Johnson serving as creator, writer, director and executive producer. Johnson stated that the series would delve into "the type of fun, character driven, case-of-the-week mystery goodness I grew up watching." The episode was written by executive story editor Tea Ho and producer Wyatt Cain, and directed by Adamma Ebo. This was Ho's first writing credit, Cain's third writing credit, and Ebo's first directing credit for the show.

=== Casting ===
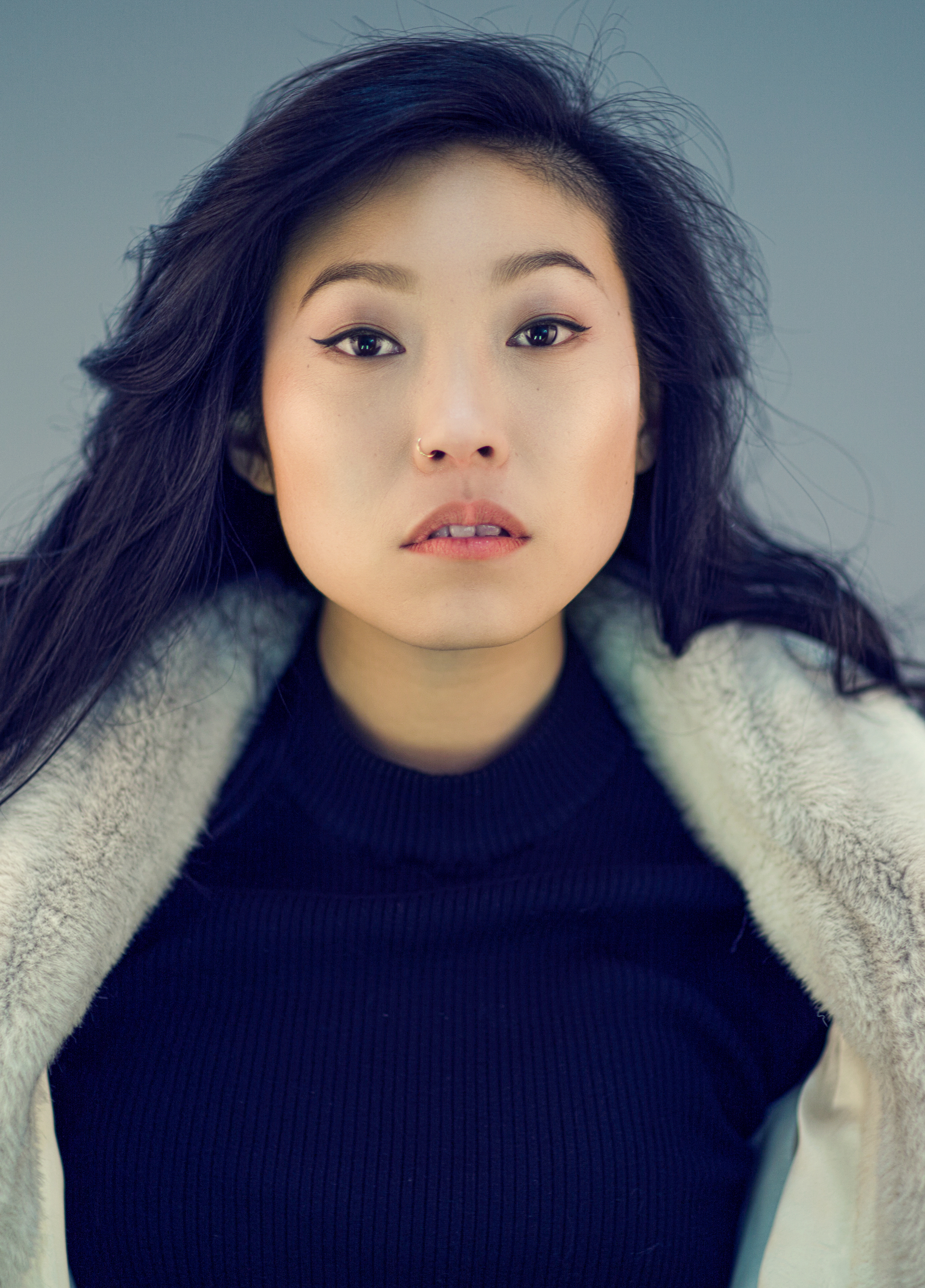
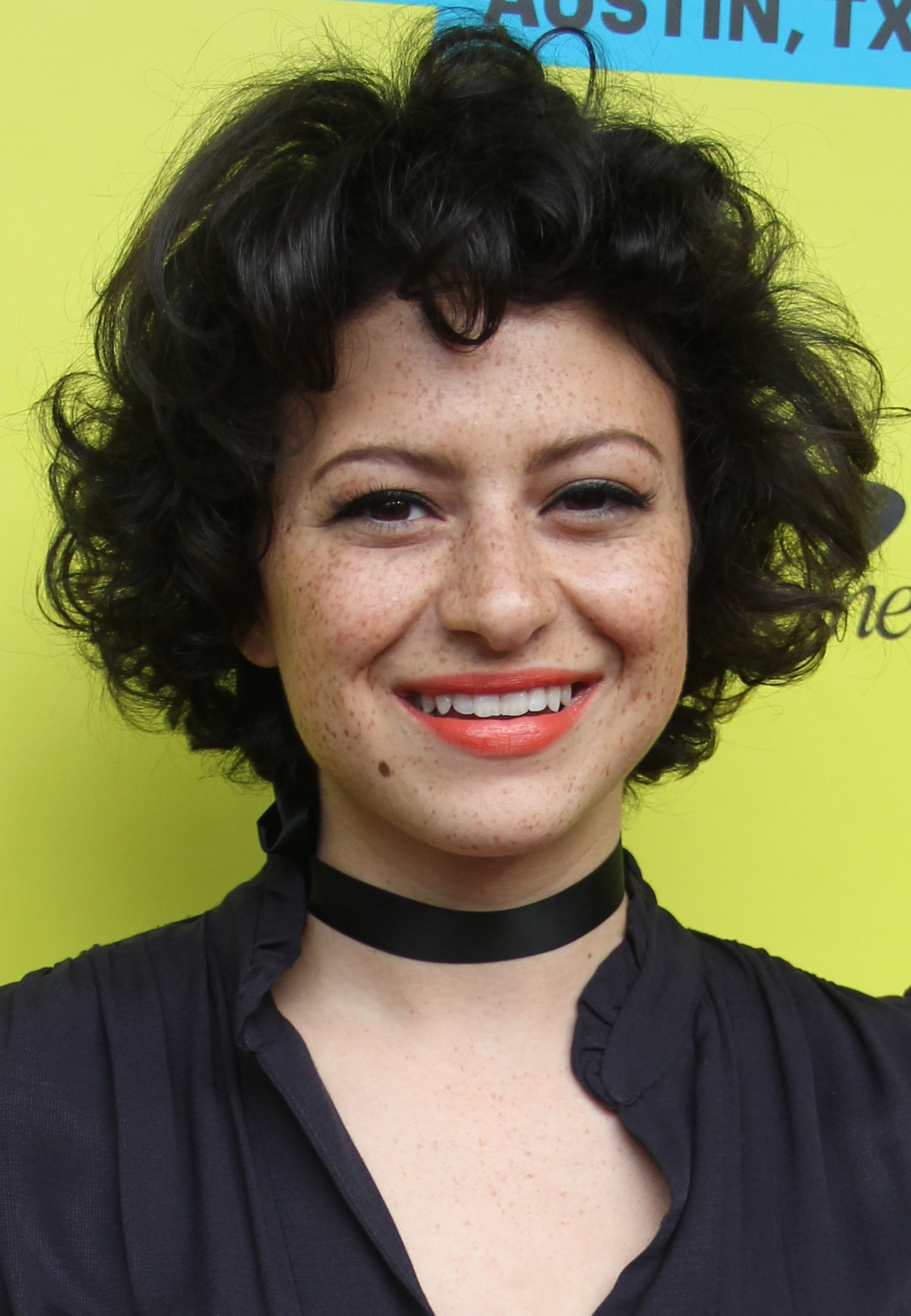
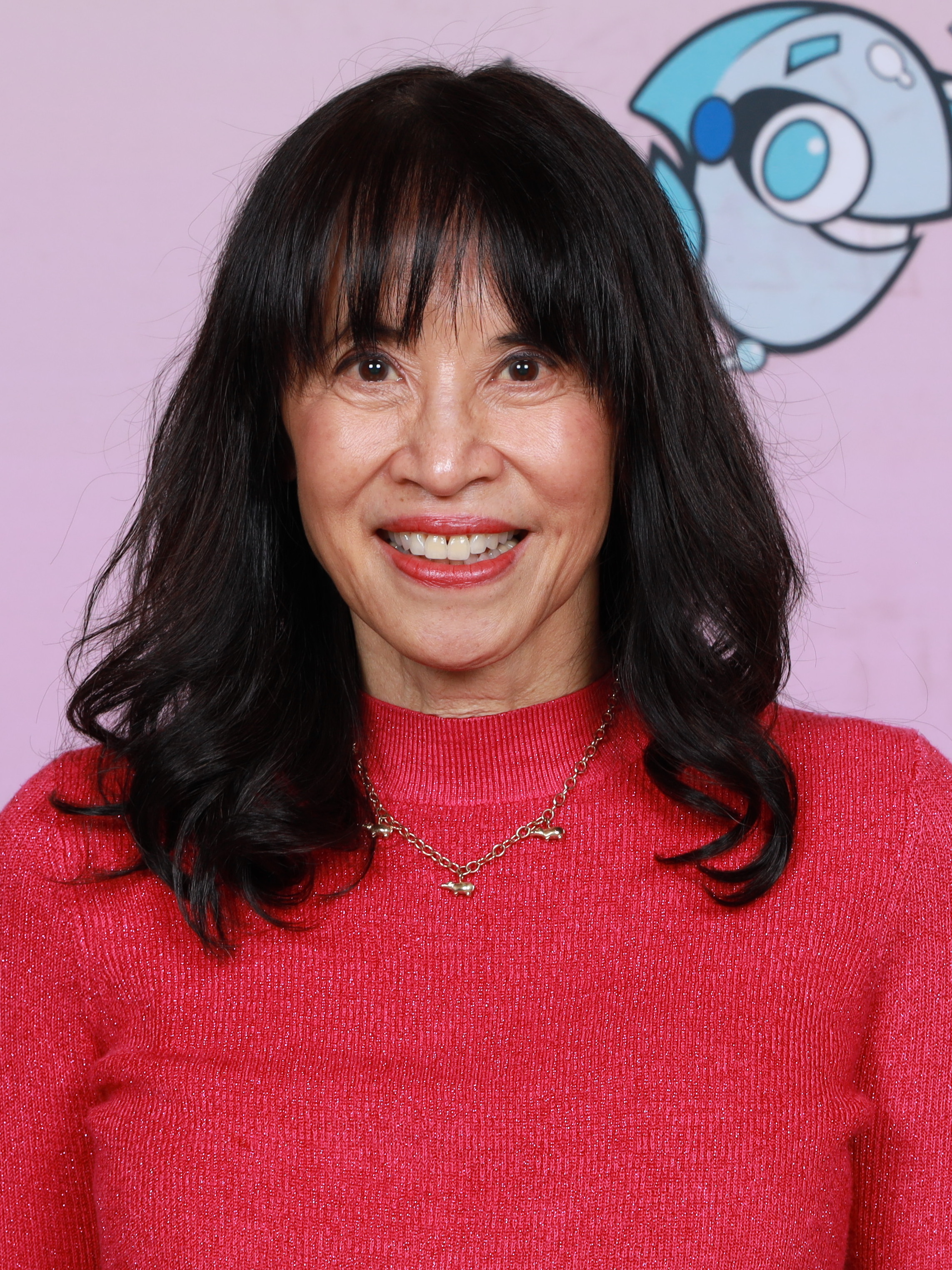
Awkwafina, Alia Shawkat, and Lauren Tom guest star in the episode.

The announcement of the series included that Natasha Lyonne would serve as the main lead actress. She was approached by Johnson about working on a procedural project together, with Lyonne as the lead character. As Johnson explained, the role was "completely cut to measure for her."

Due to the series' procedural aspects, the episodes feature several guest stars. Johnson was inspired by the amount of actors who guest starred on Columbo, wanting to deem each guest star as the star of the episode, which allowed them to attract many actors. The episode featured guest appearances by Awkwafina, Patti Harrison and Alia Shawkat, who were announced to guest star in November 2024 and February 2025. Lauren Tom also guest stars, having been introduced to the series through executive producer Adam Arkin. When she was offered the role of Anne, she accepted it, saying "I just thought, 'Oh my gosh, I'm gonna have so much fun working with my friends!’ Also, meeting Awkwafina because I had never worked with her before, so I was super jazzed. And, I got to do my first lesbian sex scene!"

== Critical reception ==
"A New Lease on Death" received positive reviews from critics. Noel Murray of The A.V. Club gave the episode a "B" grade and wrote, "I confess that part of the reason “A New Lease On Death” never fully sparked for me is that I'm not that keenly interested in or amused by New Yorkers' real-estate woes. I get that it's a reliable source for drama, comedy and satire; it just strikes me as a rather insular subject, aimed at New Yorkers only."

Alan Sepinwall wrote, "Despite an impressive guest star roster — Awkwafina, Alia Shawkat, Lauren Tom, David Alan Grier, Harrison, etc. — “A New Lease on Death” was less exciting than the last few, in part because it overlapped too much with the last few. This is two con artist stories in a row, and two of the last three episodes where the plot winds up mirroring a movie one or more of the characters is obsessed with. And while I know that it's a trope of this genre for the victim to foolishly threaten their killer with exposure, rather than simply exposing them, Poker Face is usually better about finding a new spin on the old tropes than what happened here." Louis Peitzman of Vulture gave the episode a 3 star rating out of 5 and wrote, "The idea of Charlie not on the road is an intriguing prospect, but something about this episode didn't entirely click for me. In part, it's that it feels a little like we're watching a pilot for a new series, creating an odd vibe this far into the season. But it's also that the case of the week is not as tight as I've come to expect, with a very sloppy killer depicted as a criminal mastermind."

Ben Sherlock of Screen Rant wrote, "Poker Face's mysteries-of-the-week are almost always compelling, but this one is more emotionally involving than most of the others." Melody McCune of Telltale TV gave the episode a 3.6 star rating out of 5 and wrote, "The show's reverence for cinema really shines through in every frame, from storytelling homages to various classic films to even this week's nod to Michael Clayton. The plot moves at a nice clip, too. Beyond that, the episode's greatest strength is the cast's performances. Sometimes, that's all one needs — good acting (and maybe a rent-controlled penthouse in NYC)."

=== Accolades ===
TVLine named Alia Shawkat as an honorable mention for the "Performer of the Week" for the week of June 21, 2025, for her performance in the episode. The site wrote, "Poker Face has a grand tradition of bringing in familiar faces for juicy guest roles, and Alia Shawkat sunk her teeth into a good one this week as murderous grifter Kate. Setting her sights on that ultimate New York City prize — a cheap rent-controlled apartment — Kate wooed retired professor Anne to get her hands on the lease, with a smiling Shawkat laying down a barrage of phony love-bombing. But Kate needed to get Anne's granddaughter out of the way first, and Shawkat was downright frightening as Kate plotted to knock her off in secret. When Charlie got on the case, Kate even tried to woo her, too, and Shawkat nimbly toggled between seductress and killer before finally getting caught. Kate will go down as one of Charlie Cale's most formidable adversaries yet, though, thanks to Shawkat's deliciously sinister turn."
