= The End of the Road (Poker Face) =

- Poker Face episode
- Episode no.: Season 2 Episode 12
- Directed by: Natasha Lyonne
- Written by: Laura Deeley
- Cinematography by: Jaron Presant
- Editing by: Glenn Garland
- Original air date: July 10, 2025
- Running time: 42 minutes

Guest appearances
- Justin Theroux as Todd Tolocci; Lili Taylor as Agent Darville; Patti Harrison as Alex; Haley Joel Osment as Kirby Kowalczyk; Taylor Schilling as Agent Annie Milligan; Simon Helberg as Agent Luca Clark; Rhea Perlman as Beatrix Hasp; Adam Arkin as Mark Getzler

Episode chronology
← Previous "The Day of the Iguana"	Next → —

"The End of the Road" is the series finale of the American murder mystery comedy-drama television series Poker Face. It is the 12th episode of the second season and the 22nd overall episode of the series, and was written by co-executive producer Laura Deeley, and directed by main lead actress Natasha Lyonne. It was released on Peacock on July 10, 2025.

The series follows Charlie Cale, a woman with the ability to detect if people are lying, who is now embarking on a fresh start after criminal boss Beatrix Hasp cancels a hit on her. In the episode, Charlie and Alex reach Indiana to try and save Beatrix Hasp from a deadly assassin.

The episode received critical acclaim, with critics praising the episode's plot twist, performances, tone, directing, and set-up for next season.

== Plot ==
While traveling to Greenville, Indiana, to meet with Beatrix Hasp (Rhea Perlman), Charlie (Natasha Lyonne) and Alex (Patti Harrison) are called by Luca (Simon Helberg), who warns her that "The Iguana" might be following them, and it could be anyone. Charlie hangs up the phone before the FBI can trace her precise location; while Luca and Milligan (Taylor Schilling) determine she is heading for Indiana, there are over 50 safe houses in the state.

When they stop at a diner, Charlie notices a suspicious man with the same injury as Tolocci. He notices Alex, calling her "oyster girl", and is tackled by other patrons as they flee. Convinced they lost the Iguana, Charlie and Alex head to Hasp's house, where Charlie leaves to investigate. She returns to find Alex missing from the car. Inside, she finds Hasp's corpse and the bodies of multiple federal agents. When Alex appears, Charlie deduces that she was the Iguana all along.

Alex explains that she had killed powerful people across different circles in the world but had become bored by the lack of challenge in her jobs. One day, her agent had told her about Charlie, who cannot be lied to and is the only one with a connection to their target, Beatrix Hasp. By carefully suppressing her involuntary responses, she has been able to successfully dupe Charlie and earn her trust. When she found that Kirby (Haley Joel Osment) was going to get married, she hired another assassin (Justin Theroux) who also specialized in lookalike disguises to kill him. Alex then killed the assassin and intentionally implicated herself to secure Charlie's help in finding Hasp. At the diner, she offered a man in the bathroom an oyster before attacking him so that he would later confront her.

Alex prepares to kill Charlie, but the latter reveals that she triggered the smoke alarm, which alerts the authorities and allows the FBI to find the safe house. Taking Charlie hostage at gunpoint, Alex flees in the Barracuda with the FBI in pursuit. Charlie goads Alex into playing Two Truths and a Lie: if Charlie wins, she stops the car and they become lifelong nemeses; if Charlie loses, Alex will drive them off a cliff. Charlie wins, but the car's brakes fail. She jumps out of the car and is helped up by Luca.

Luca tells Charlie that she will be hunted by the FBI for unwittingly abetting The Iguana in murdering Hasp, but he lets her go with a warning that he will arrest her if he finds her again. At the bottom of the cliff, Milligan finds the Barracuda empty. Charlie and a stray dog are picked up by a trucker (Steve Earle) on the way to Wichita, Kansas.

== Production ==
=== Development ===
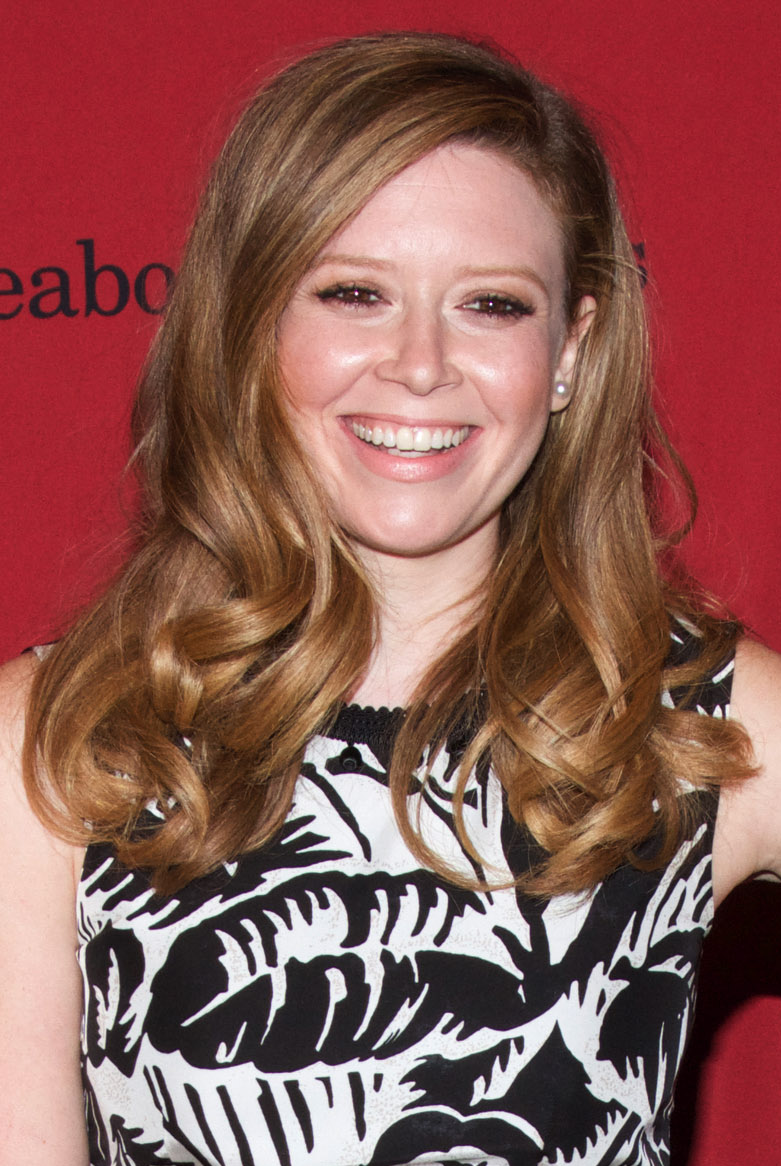
Series star Natasha Lyonne directed the episode.

The series was announced in March 2021, with Rian Johnson serving as creator, writer, director and executive producer. Johnson stated that the series would delve into "the type of fun, character driven, case-of-the-week mystery goodness I grew up watching." The episode was written by co-executive producer Laura Deeley, and directed by main lead actress Natasha Lyonne. This was Deeley's second writing credit, and Lyonne's third directing credit for the show.

Before the episode aired, Johnson said that the episode would be part of a two-parter season finale, "It's something that — in a really fun, unexpected way — caps the season. It's not just another Poker Face episode. It’s a finale-finale for the season. [...] It's almost like the last two are a two-parter. Ti West directed episode 11 and Natasha directed 12 [the finale], and you have two beautiful, beautiful brains concocting this one-two punch that is so surprising. We didn't even show it to the press."

=== Writing ===
The episode reveals that Alex was a deadly assassin, setting her as Charlie's nemesis. Co-executive producer Laura Deeley came up with the plot twist, introducing her as someone who can challenge Charlie's lie detector. Showrunner Tony Tost explained, "We've got our kind of spin on a classic old-school detective, and there's a set number of archetypes there. So we thought it would be fun to introduce a character that seems like she's going to be Charlie's Watson, but ends up being her Moriarty."

The writers decided that Alex would come out to kill Beatrix Hasp, as Tost says "what would justify the world's greatest hit woman to come in?" Patti Harrison added, "The actual process of building the character and stuff, was really fun. It was really daunting. I appreciated how much space I had with fleshing out the character, but I do think they also wanted something specifically with the tone, and I think a lot of times, that's challenging if you’re in a dramedy or a show that tonally needs to be able to get back to the emotional stakes without being too hammy or weird."

Simon Helberg commented on Luca's decision to give a head start to Charlie before she is pursued by the FBI, "It was really spectacular. It feels like they've really teed up, in terms of the characters, that they're in this impossible situation. They're both sort of attracted and repelled by one another, given who they are and what they need and want. And you feel that in that moment, and you wonder, 'Oh my God, how are they ever going to cross paths again?' But of course, how are they not? We want to see that and yet it feels kind of tragic."

=== Casting ===
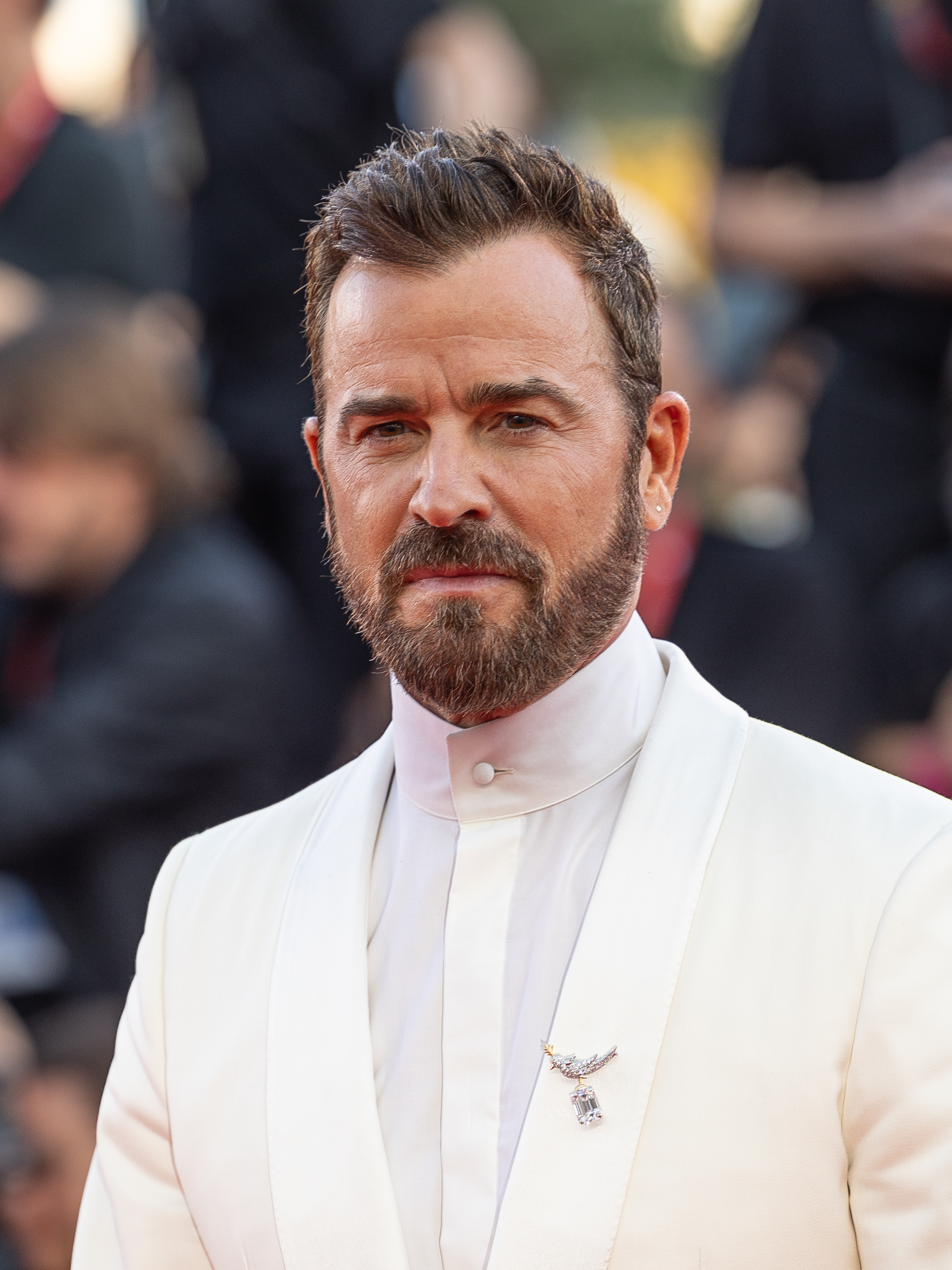
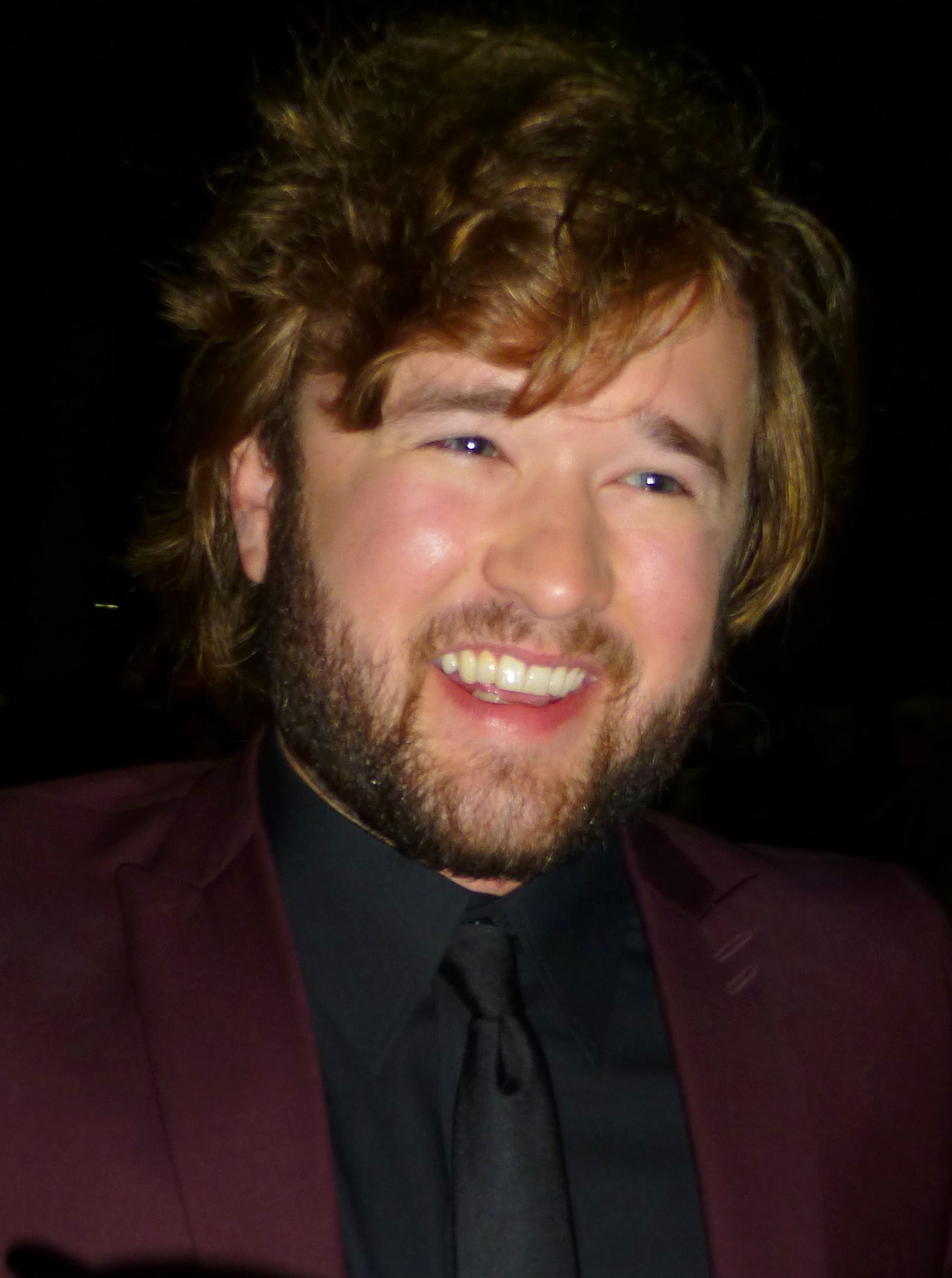
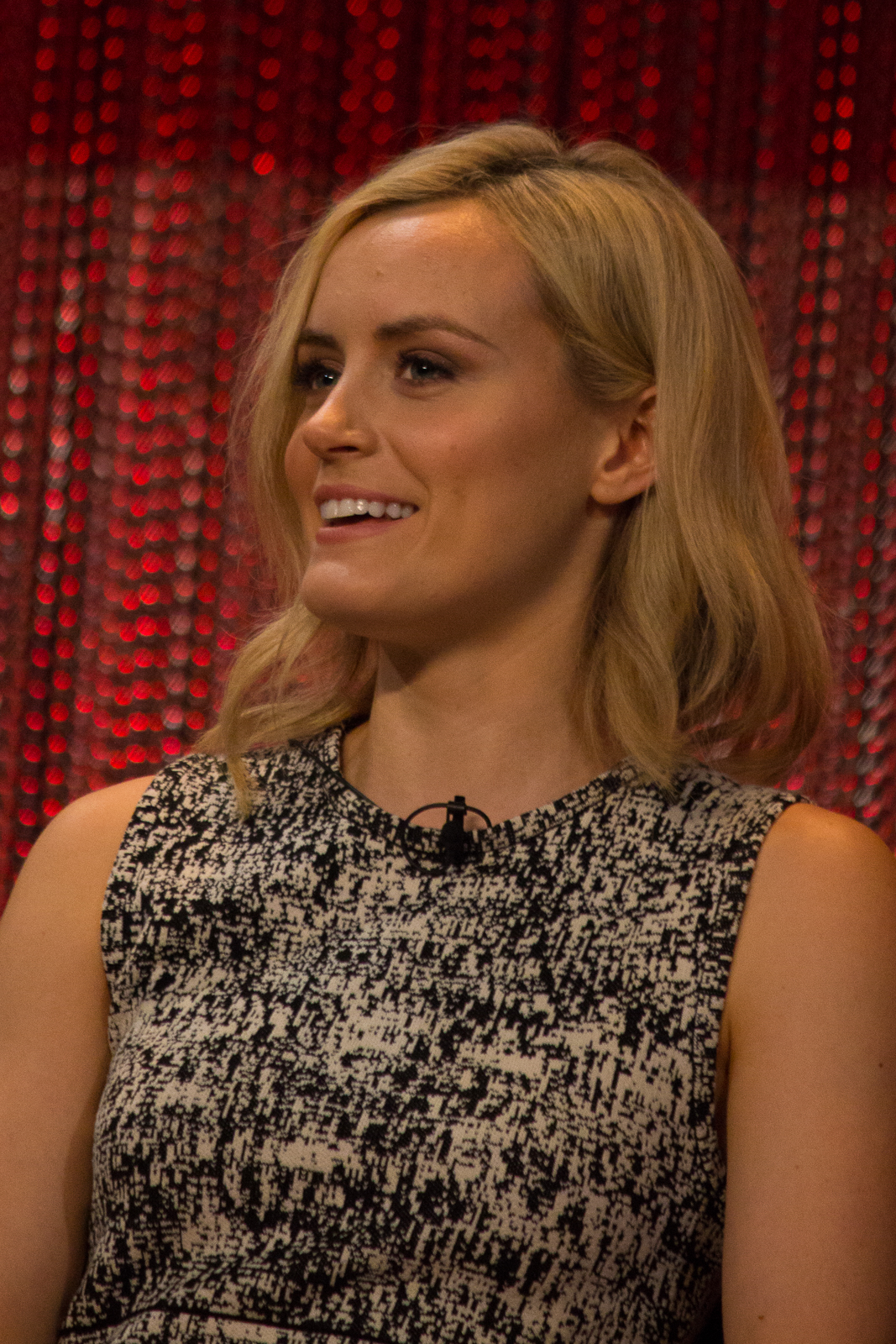
Justin Theroux, Haley Joel Osment, Patti Harrison, and Taylor Schilling guest star in the episode.

The announcement of the series included that Natasha Lyonne would serve as the main lead actress. She was approached by Johnson about working on a procedural project together, with Lyonne as the lead character. As Johnson explained, the role was "completely cut to measure for her."

Due to the series' procedural aspects, the episodes feature several guest stars. Johnson was inspired by the amount of actors who guest starred on Columbo, wanting to deem each guest star as the star of the episode, which allowed them to attract many actors. The episode featured guest appearances by Justin Theroux, Haley Joel Osment, Patti Harrison, and Taylor Schilling, who were announced to guest star in February and March 2025.

== Critical reception ==
"The End of the Road" received critical acclaim. Noel Murray of The A.V. Club gave the episode an "A" grade and wrote, "how you feel about the Poker Face season two finale will almost certainly be tied to whether or not you like its big twist. Me? I enjoyed being fooled, especially given that I had entertained the possibility of Alex's big switcheroo before deciding, “Nah, not happening.” Still, I can certainly understand why some fans might be disappointed in how this all goes. It was so nice for Charlie to have a friend. Did she need her own personal Moriarty? Here's the thing, though: Alex is a really good Moriarty. And one thing I love about crime stories Rian Johnson is involved with: For the most part, the pieces fit together neatly."

Alan Sepinwall wrote, "My only real gripe with "The End of the Road" was the Thelma & Louise gag, where it appears that Charlie and Alex have driven off the cliff together in a freeze-frame, only for the action to rewind so we see that Charlie escaped. On the whole, I've enjoyed the slightly goofier tone of several of this season's episodes, but this felt like an odd moment for something that formally weird, given how tense the closing act of the episode was." Louis Peitzman of Vulture gave the episode a 4 star rating out of 5 and wrote, "While some recent episodes, including last week's lackluster installment, have shown signs of a sophomore slump, we're ending on a high note. Should the series get a third season, I'll be excited to find out where this story is headed next."

Ben Sherlock of Screen Rant wrote, "Poker Face's second season hasn't been perfect, but it's had a lot more hits than misses, and this finale is a more than satisfying conclusion." Melody McCune of Telltale TV gave the episode a 4.2 star rating out of 5 and wrote, "“The End of the Road” is proof positive that when this series fires on all cylinders, it becomes so hot that the brakes give out and it careens off a cliff. Well, figuratively. And, thankfully, we have time to tuck and roll before the narrative wreckage consumes us, marveling at where this series can — and should — go."
