= The Day of the Iguana =

- Poker Face episode
- Episode no.: Season 2 Episode 11
- Directed by: Ti West
- Written by: Andrew Sodroski
- Cinematography by: Christine Ng
- Editing by: Shaheed Qaasim
- Original air date: July 3, 2025
- Running time: 43 minutes

Guest appearances
- Justin Theroux as "The Iguana" / Todd Tolocci; Lili Taylor as Agent Darville; Patti Harrison as Alex; Haley Joel Osment as Kirby Kowalczyk; Taylor Schilling as Agent Annie Milligan; Simon Helberg as Agent Luca Clark; Rhea Perlman as Beatrix Hasp

Episode chronology
← Previous "The Big Pump"	Next → "The End of the Road"

"The Day of the Iguana" is the eleventh episode of the second season of the American murder mystery comedy-drama television series Poker Face. It is the 21st overall episode of the series and was written by consulting producer Andrew Sodroski, and directed by Ti West. It was released on Peacock on July 3, 2025.

The series follows Charlie Cale, a woman with the ability to detect if people are lying, who is now embarking on a fresh start after criminal boss Beatrix Hasp cancels a hit on her. In the episode, Charlie decides to help Alex with a new oyster business at a wedding venue, when the groom is found murdered.

The episode received highly positive reviews from critics, with praise towards Theroux's guest appearance, tension and set-up for the season finale. However, some were mixed on the episode's lack of resolution.

== Plot ==
In New York City, high school teacher Todd Tolocci (Justin Theroux) prepares to attend the wedding of Kirby Kowalczyk (Haley Joel Osment), creator of an energy drink. A chauffeur arrives to drive him there. As Todd lets him in, the man enters the house, kills him, and removes his glass eye. After using a machine to liquefy Todd's body, the man dons facial prosthetics to resemble Todd.

At the wedding, "Todd" notices Luca Clark (Simon Helberg) and other federal agents surveilling the scene, and contacts his handler for not informing him. His handler tells him to find a "patsy" for the assassination for double the money. Alex (Patti Harrison), working as an oyster caterer for the wedding, walks in. "Todd" flirts with her as a cover. Inside, he strangles Kirby, injects him with a sedative, and moves him to the boathouse where he stabs him in the eye with Alex's oyster knife. Alex arrives at the boathouse to collect more oysters and finds Kirby's corpse, before "Todd" knocks her unconscious. He then drops them off in a boat, where Kirby's wife, Victoria Noble-Perdue, finds them. Alex wakes up holding the knife.

A few days earlier, Alex convinces Charlie (Natasha Lyonne) to work with her at the wedding. Unbeknownst to them, Luca is survelling with the help of agents Darville (Lili Taylor) and Milligan (Taylor Schilling). Charlie runs into Luca and, noticing a gift from Beatrix Hasp, realizes that Kirby is Hasp's son. Luca reveals that Hasp's deal granted her a livestream of Kirby's wedding, whom she has not seen since he was born, but Kirby has refused. Charlie finds him at the port and convinces him that his mother arranged so much just to see him. While taking a break later, she notices a man carrying another man to the boathouse.

Kirby's body is discovered and Charlie sees Alex proclaim her innocence and escape. With the FBI looking for Alex for the murder, and Hasp's mob connections looking for her son's murderer, Charlie finds her in the kitchen and they sneak out to the boathouse via mascot costumes. Luca notices them but fails to convince Charlie to turn back. Upon reaching the port, they escape in Charlie's car, while Luca is reprimanded by his colleagues. As Charlie tries to find ways to help Alex, she realizes she can only ask Hasp herself for help. Checking her Instagram account, she manages to find her address in Greenville, Indiana. Back in the venue, Milligan tells Luca and Darville that the possible assassin might be the "Iguana", the deadliest assassin in the world. Luca realizes that the Iguana did not just plan Kirby's murder; he is following Charlie and Alex so they can lead him to Hasp. In Greenville, Hasp (Rhea Perlman) is seen at her house preparing food and taking pictures.

== Production ==
=== Development ===
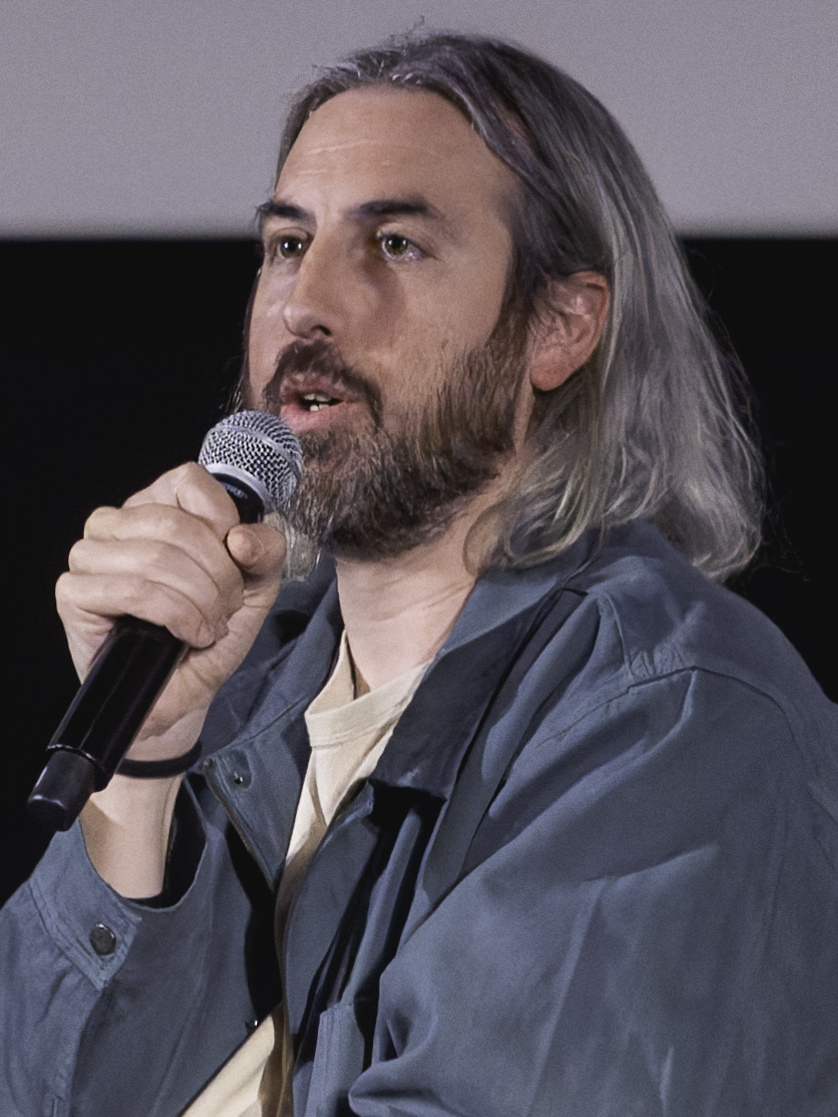
Ti West directed the episode.

The series was announced in March 2021, with Rian Johnson serving as creator, writer, director and executive producer. Johnson stated that the series would delve into "the type of fun, character driven, case-of-the-week mystery goodness I grew up watching." The episode was written by consulting producer Andrew Sodroski, and directed by Ti West. This was Sodroski's first writing credit, and West's first directing credit for the show.

Before the episode aired, Johnson said that the episode would be a two-parter season finale, "It's something that — in a really fun, unexpected way — caps the season. It's not just another Poker Face episode. It’s a finale-finale for the season. [...] It's almost like the last two are a two-parter. Ti West directed episode 11 and Natasha directed 12 [the finale], and you have two beautiful, beautiful brains concocting this one-two punch that is so surprising. We didn't even show it to the press."

=== Casting ===
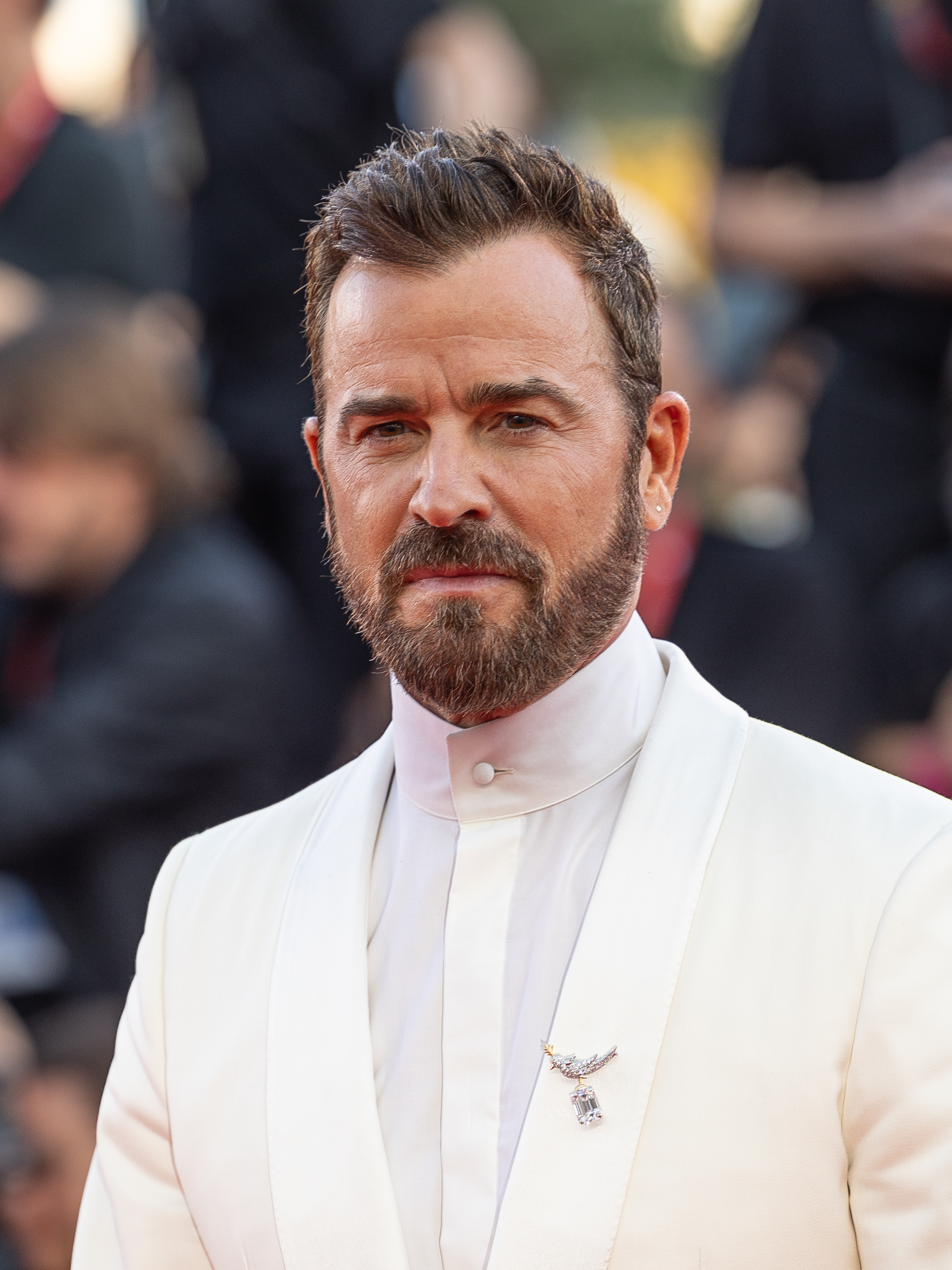
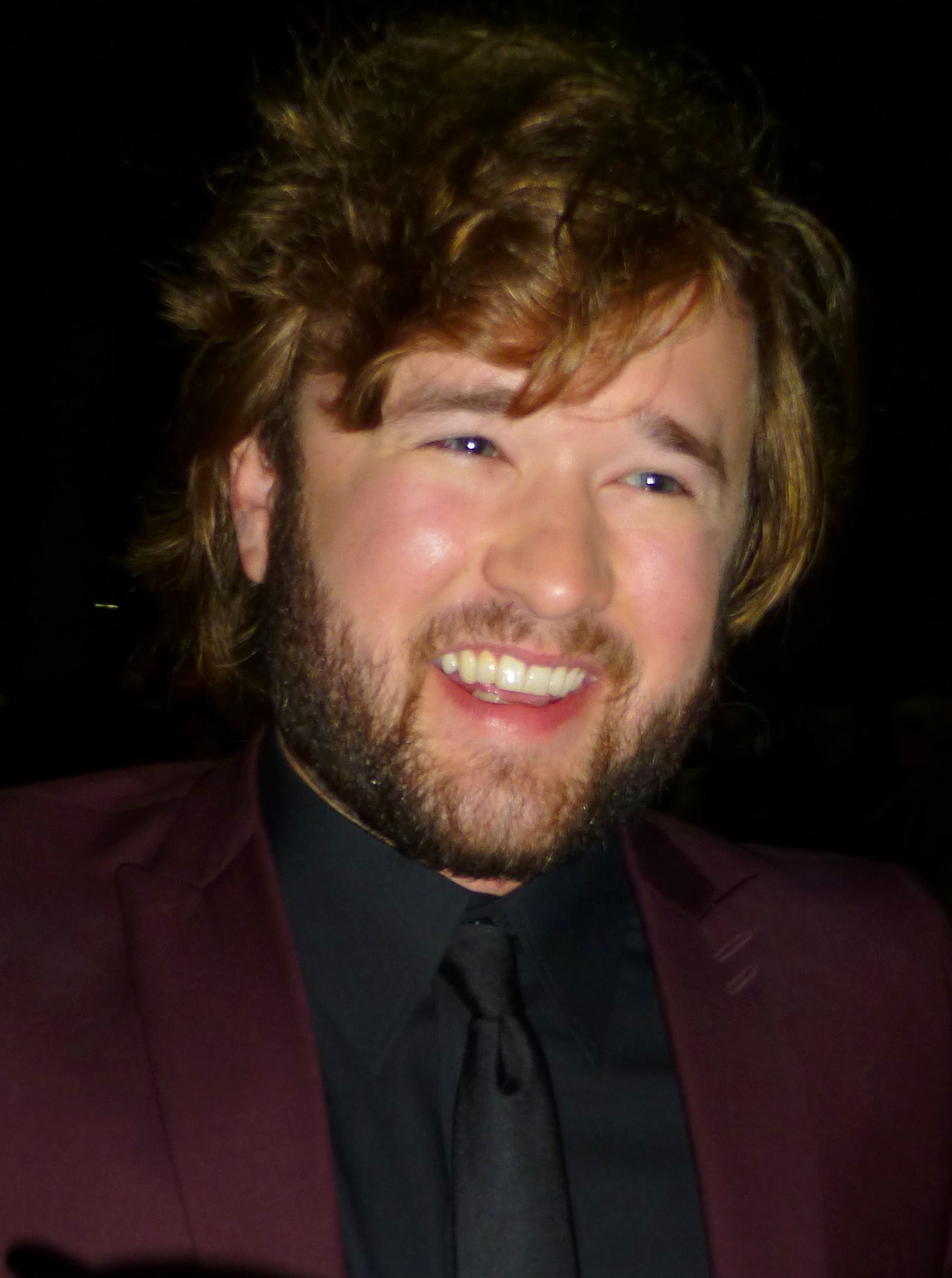
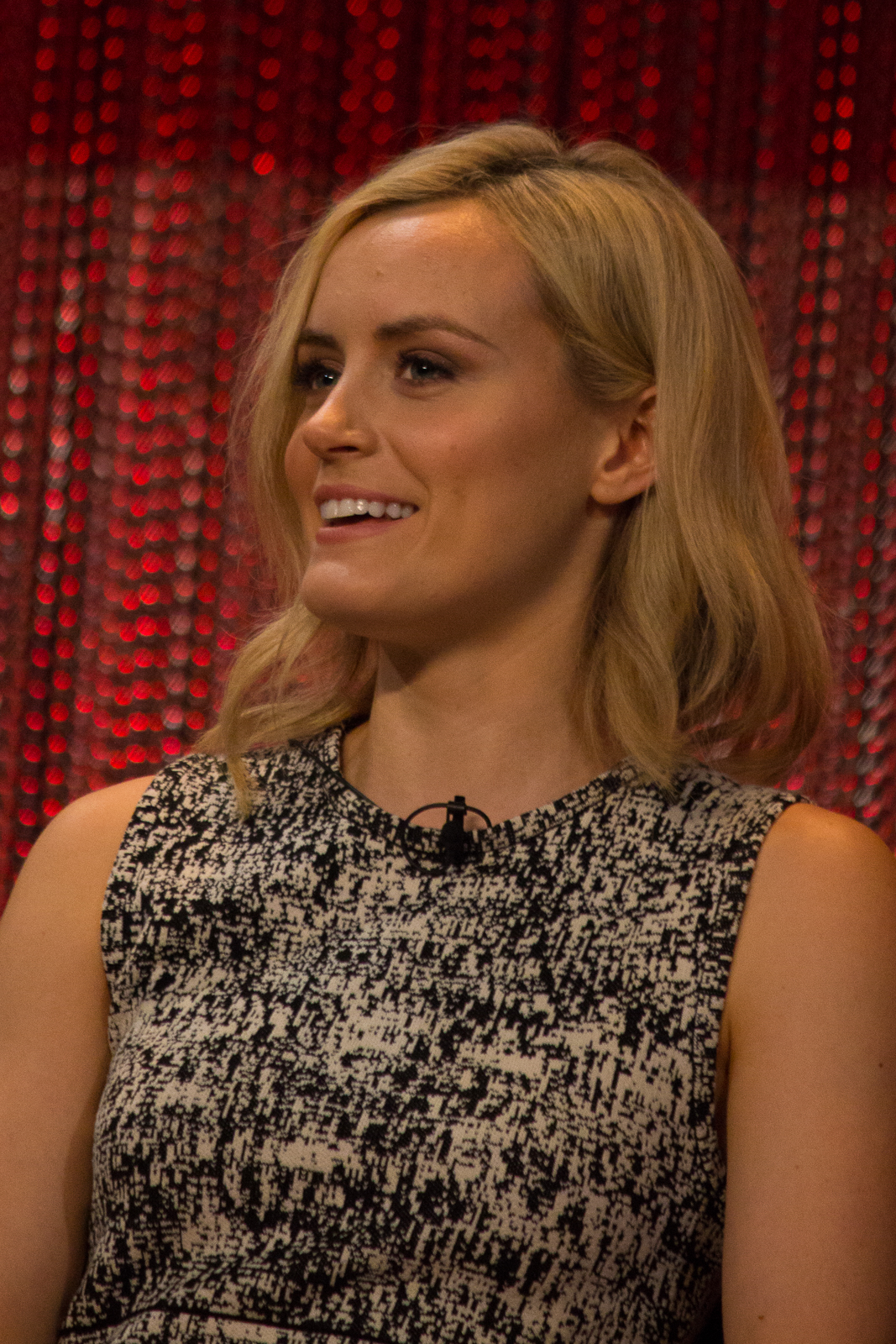
Justin Theroux, Haley Joel Osment, Patti Harrison, and Taylor Schilling guest star in the episode.

The announcement of the series included that Natasha Lyonne would serve as the main lead actress. She was approached by Johnson about working on a procedural project together, with Lyonne as the lead character. As Johnson explained, the role was "completely cut to measure for her."

Due to the series' procedural aspects, the episodes feature several guest stars. Johnson was inspired by the amount of actors who guest starred on Columbo, wanting to deem each guest star as the star of the episode, which allowed them to attract many actors. The episode featured guest appearances by Justin Theroux, Haley Joel Osment, Patti Harrison, and Taylor Schilling, who were announced to guest star in February and March 2025.

== Critical reception ==
"The Day of the Iguana" received highly positive reviews from critics. Noel Murray of The A.V. Club gave the episode an "A" grade and wrote, "“Day Of The Iguana” is a very funny episode — so much so that I'm going to have to consign most of the best lines to stray observations. And it features multiple kinds of terrible people. Sure, the Iguana is a ruthless assassin, but he's not the one serving wedding guests a signature cocktail made of vodka, botanicals, and Ballzilla."

Louis Peitzman of Vulture gave the episode a 2 star rating out of 5 and wrote, "It's not like there isn't fun to be had in “Day of the Iguana,” the penultimate episode of the season, but on a show that's made a name for itself with its throwback case-of-the-week format, the reveal that this installment is just set up for the finale is more than a little deflating. What is Poker Face if Charlie doesn’t solve a crime?"

Ben Sherlock of Screen Rant wrote, "Poker Face usually resolves its mysteries of the week, well, within the week. But with sky-high stakes, returning characters, and a victim we already care about, this one is worth stretching out to a couple of episodes. It might be a bit unbelievable that Hasp, a notorious criminal hiding out in witness protection, would be careless enough to post a picture on Instagram with her address in plain sight. But it's an exciting setup for next week’s finale to feel truly climactic." Melody McCune of Telltale TV gave the episode a 4.2 star rating out of 5 and wrote, "Poker Face Season 2 Episode 11, “Day of the Iguana,” artfully combines elements from the overarching narrative to create a thrilling penultimate outing. While there are fun comedic beats, the episode really leans into the thriller genre, throwing Charlie headfirst into a high-stakes, frightening adventure featuring her most powerful foe yet."
