= The Big Pump =

- Poker Face episode
- Episode no.: Season 2 Episode 10
- Directed by: Clea DuVall
- Written by: Raphie Cantor
- Cinematography by: Jaron Presant
- Editing by: Melissa Kent
- Original air date: June 26, 2025
- Running time: 42 minutes

Guest appearances
- Cliff "Method Man" Smith as Francis "Brick" Bricatino; Jason Ritter as Rodney; Patti Harrison as Alex; Natasha Leggero as Lily Bricatino; Myra Lucretia Taylor as Noreen

Episode chronology
← Previous "A New Lease on Death"	Next → "The Day of the Iguana"

"The Big Pump" is the tenth episode of the second season of the American murder mystery comedy-drama television series Poker Face. It is the twentieth overall episode of the series and was written by Raphie Cantor, and directed by Clea DuVall. It was released on Peacock on June 26, 2025.

The series follows Charlie Cale, a woman with the ability to detect if people are lying, who is now embarking on a fresh start after criminal boss Beatrix Hasp cancels a hit on her. In the episode, Charlie is still in New York City, and reluctantly agrees to help a woman in solving a mysterious death in a gym.

The episode received mostly positive reviews from critics, who praised the performances, Charlie's character development and DuVall's directing.

== Plot ==
In Brooklyn, Brick (Cliff "Method Man" Smith) owns a gym, The Brick House, where he aims to build a strong connection with his regular customers. One of them, Rodney (Jason Ritter), is frustrated that he has seen no gains in his muscles despite attending for one year. He asks Brick to get him some of the "good stuff", as he wants to face his former bully at his upcoming high school reunion. Brick reluctantly agrees and gets his wife Lily (Natasha Leggero) to retrieve the "good stuff" from her job at a birth center: stolen breast milk. Lily reminds Brick that Rodney is a health inspector, so Brick gives him whey powder instead.

Two weeks later, Rodney has still not seen progress. When he checks another customer's bottle, he realizes its contents and privately confronts Brick, threatening to shut the place down. They get into a brutal fight, with Rodney revealing he actually knows karate. As Rodney gains the upper hand, Brick throws a weight at his throat, killing him. Brick stages the scene to make it look like Rodney accidentally killed himself with a barbell and leaves as other gymgoers arrive to discover the body.

One day prior, Charlie (Natasha Lyonne) is still staying in Brooklyn and taking care of Good Buddy's apartment. After experiencing neck and back pain, she goes to a coffee shop where she runs again into Alex (Patti Harrison). Seeing an ad for spinal realignment at the Brick House, Charlie and Alex decide to join the gym. They meet Rodney, who gives them his two rules: always use a spotter while benching, and rotate muscle groups.

The following day, Charlie and Alex arrive at the gym to discover that Rodney had died. Alex does not believe the story, as he had worked shoulders the previous day and he always used a spotter. Learning about Charlie's lie-detecting ability, Alex convinces her to snoop in Brick's office, but he catches them. Due to dwindling supplies, Brick passes a soy-based infant formula as breast milk, giving users flatulence. Alex and Charlie fight over their involvement in the situation, and Alex storms off. After seeing patrons experience flatulence and burping like a baby, Charlie connects them to the infant formula.

Charlie returns to the gym and uses a wristband to check Brick's stats, finding that he made a barbell record around the same hour Rodney was killed. However, she accidentally alerts Brick by giving the stat a "like", and he locks her in the sauna to kill her. Charlie uses the wristband to send a signal to Alex, who saves her at the last minute. Cornered by Brick, they get into a fight with him. Before he can kill them, Lily arrives. Brick breaks down and admits his mistakes; Lily consoles him and tells them to call the police. At a coffee shop, Charlie notes Alex's honesty and tells her about her origins in the casino.

== Production ==
=== Development ===
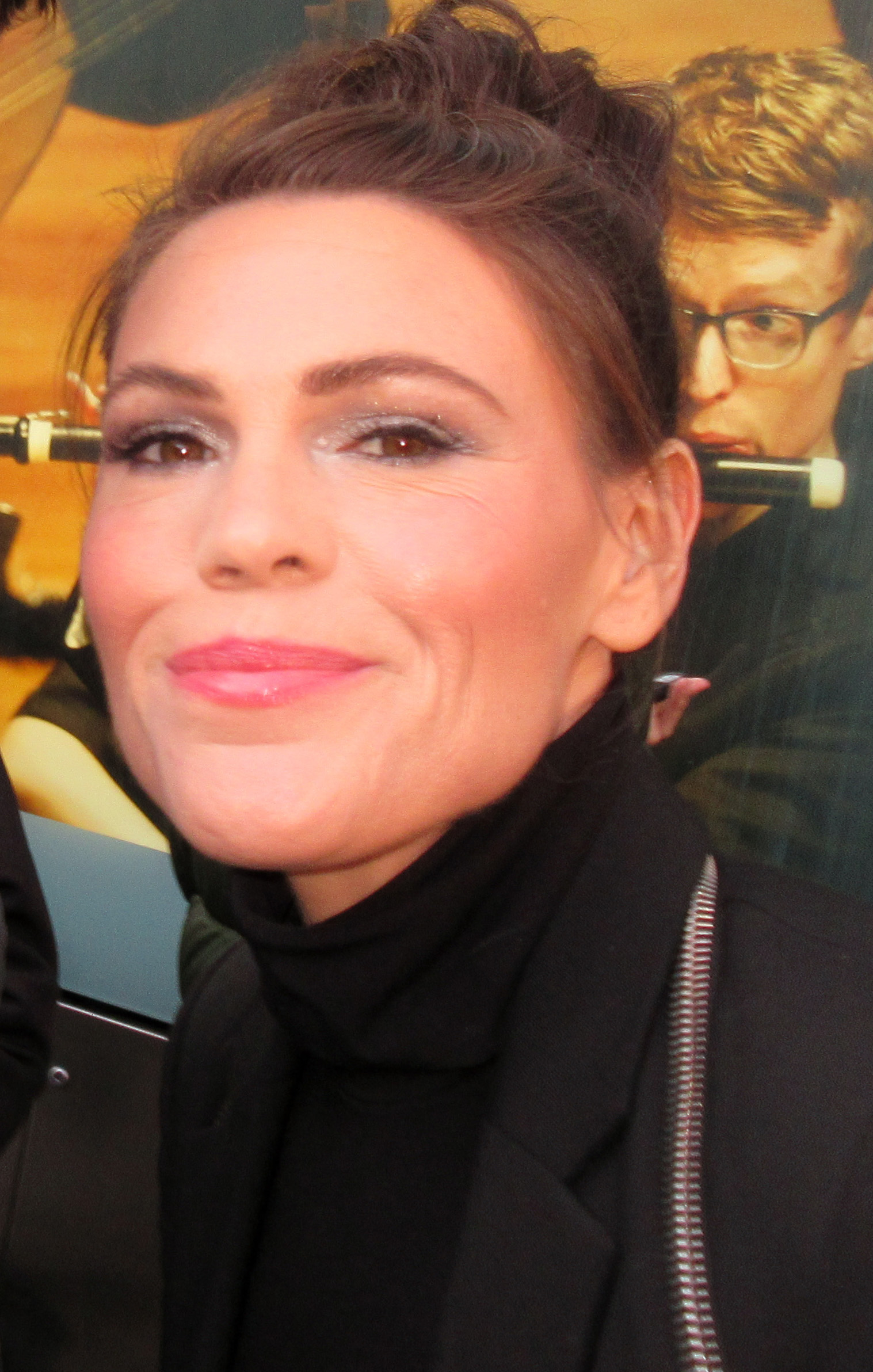
Clea DuVall directed the episode.

The series was announced in March 2021, with Rian Johnson serving as creator, writer, director and executive producer. Johnson stated that the series would delve into "the type of fun, character driven, case-of-the-week mystery goodness I grew up watching." The episode was written by Raphie Cantor, and directed by Clea DuVall. This was Cantor's first writing credit, and DuVall's first directing credit for the show.

DuVall previously guest starred in the episode "The Hook". She said that she was originally slated to direct a different episode, but "there was a recalibration, but I love this story. It was so fun and funny. [...] Knowing that the show is so good and the writing is so good and that we have Natasha leading it, I just knew that no matter what the genre was, it was going to be incredible." To prepare for the episode, she rewatched all the episodes from the first season and watched "every film reference" brought by executive producers Johnson and showrunner Tony Tost.

=== Casting ===
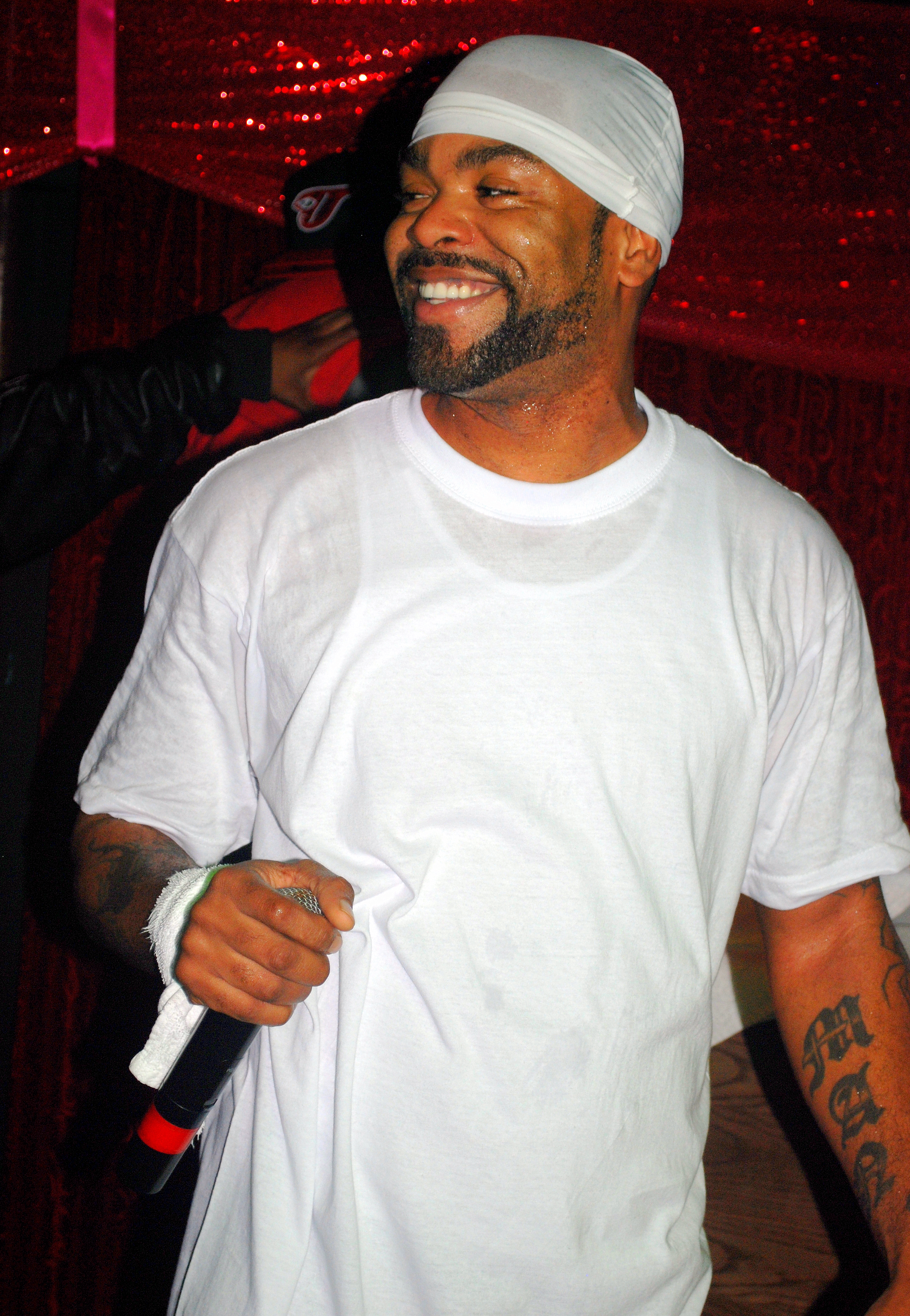
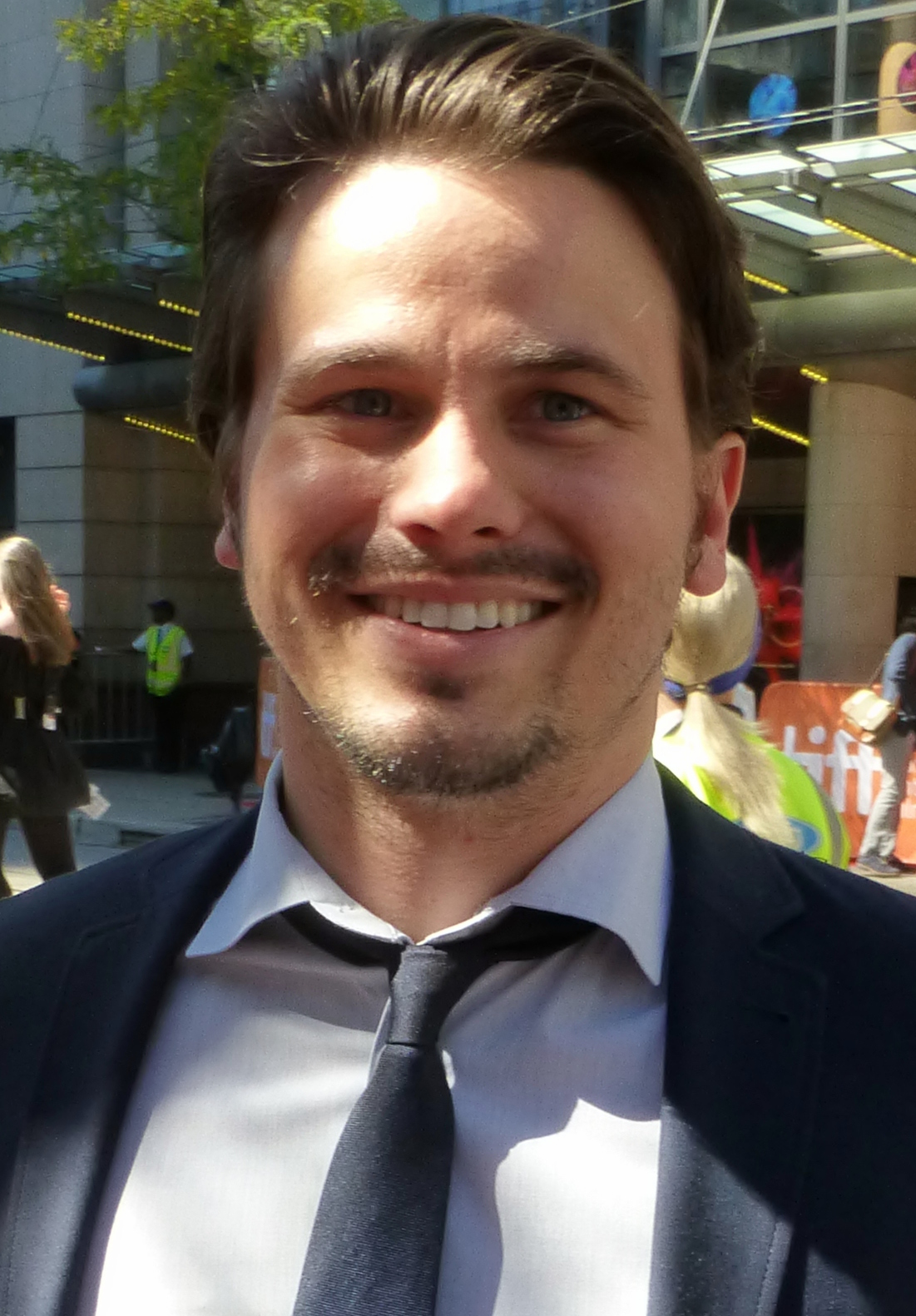
Method Man, Patti Harrison, and Jason Ritter guest star in the episode.

The announcement of the series included that Natasha Lyonne would serve as the main lead actress. She was approached by Johnson about working on a procedural project together, with Lyonne as the lead character. As Johnson explained, the role was "completely cut to measure for her."

Due to the series' procedural aspects, the episodes feature several guest stars. Johnson was inspired by the amount of actors who guest starred on Columbo, wanting to deem each guest star as the star of the episode, which allowed them to attract many actors. The episode featured guest appearances by Method Man, Patti Harrison, and Jason Ritter, who were announced to guest star in November 2024 and February 2025. Method Man said that he was fascinated by the character of Brick, just for the fact that "he thinks he's an alpha when he's actually a beta. Ego is a powerful drug. But all in all, I thought this was different from anyone I've ever played before."

=== Filming ===
The episode was filmed over the course of 10 days. DuVall said that as Rian Johnson was directing "The Game Is a Foot" prior to this episode, she had the chance to see him direct. She said, "I got to go and just shadow him on set, which was so cool because I think he is one of the greatest directors working right now. To get to watch him work was so thrilling for me."

For the scene where Charlie experiences neck pain, DuVall had the camera make a little tilt, which is reversed to normality when she is cured. She explained, "It just felt like this fun little moment of going from “Everything is normal” to “Everything kind of shifts slightly.” Speaking as someone who has had a crick in my head many times, it does feel like the whole world is at an axis. It just seemed like a fun way to play with that."

== Critical reception ==
"The Big Pump" received mostly positive reviews from critics. Noel Murray of The A.V. Club gave the episode a "B" grade and wrote, "the reason I liked this episode more — besides the plot being snappier — is that it's also about loneliness. Alex so very badly wants Charlie to be her friend and for the two of them to solve crimes together. Sadly, she's catching Charlie at a time when she's trying to mind her own business and avoid close attachments, so that she doesn’t have to deal with the psychological damage that comes from getting involved in so many murder cases."

Alan Sepinwall wrote, "Natasha Lyonne and Patti Harrison make a good comedic team, and there's some excellent self-aware humor this time, including the “23 seconds later” cut that skips over Charlie again explaining her superpower to someone, and Charlie's “Hard cut to what the fuck am I doing?” joke." Louis Peitzman of Vulture gave the episode a 4 star rating out of 5 and wrote, "Unlike pretty much everyone else Charlie has ever encountered, her new sidekick is firmly committed to telling the truth. And while that's probably why Alex doesn't have any other friends, it makes her the perfect companion to someone with a preternatural nose for bullshit."

Ben Sherlock of Screen Rant wrote, "Harrison is a great “straight man” foil for Lyonne, and it's an interesting new dynamic to give the solo detective a partner. The introduction of Alex builds on Charlie's season-long efforts to connect with other people and leave behind her lonely life as a one-woman wolfpack. From now on, Poker Face might be a very different show." Melody McCune of Telltale TV gave the episode a 4 star rating out of 5 and wrote, "Poker Face delivers another fun outing, continuing the season's hot streak of compelling, wildly entertaining episodic stories. With two episodes remaining in Season 2, it'll be interesting to see if the series can maintain this momentum."
