= 1987 =

1987 in various calendars
- Gregorian calendar: 1987; MCMLXXXVII
- Ab urbe condita: 2740
- Armenian calendar: 1436; ԹՎ ՌՆԼԶ
- Assyrian calendar: 6737
- Baháʼí calendar: 143–144
- Balinese saka calendar: 1908–1909
- Bengali calendar: 1393–1394
- Berber calendar: 2937
- British Regnal year: 35 Eliz. 2 – 36 Eliz. 2
- Buddhist calendar: 2531
- Burmese calendar: 1349
- Byzantine calendar: 7495–7496
- Chinese calendar: 丙寅年 (Fire Tiger); 4684 or 4477 — to — 丁卯年 (Fire Rabbit); 4685 or 4478
- Coptic calendar: 1703–1704
- Discordian calendar: 3153
- Ethiopian calendar: 1979–1980
- Hebrew calendar: 5747–5748
- Hindu calendars
- Vikram Samvat: 2043–2044
- Shaka Samvat: 1908–1909
- Kali Yuga: 5087–5088
- Holocene calendar: 11987
- Igbo calendar: 987–988
- Iranian calendar: 1365–1366
- Islamic calendar: 1407–1408
- Japanese calendar: Shōwa 62 (昭和６２年)
- Javanese calendar: 1919–1920
- Juche calendar: 76
- Julian calendar: Gregorian minus 13 days
- Korean calendar: 4320
- Minguo calendar: ROC 76 民國76年
- Nanakshahi calendar: 519
- Thai solar calendar: 2530
- Tibetan calendar: མེ་ཕོ་སྟག་ལོ་ (male Fire-Tiger); 2113 or 1732 or 960 — to — མེ་མོ་ཡོས་ལོ་ (female Fire-Hare); 2114 or 1733 or 961
- Unix time: 536457600 – 567993599

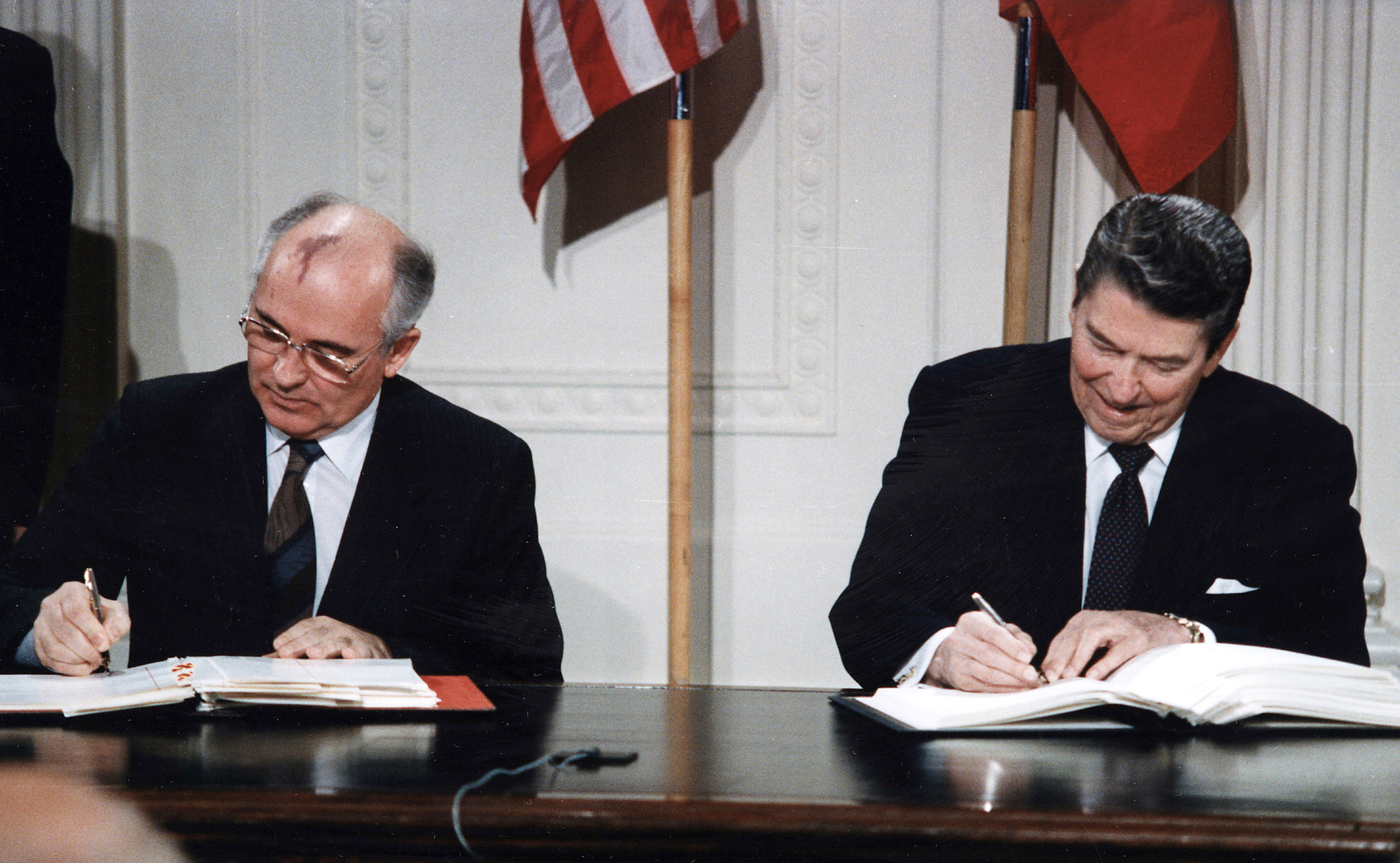
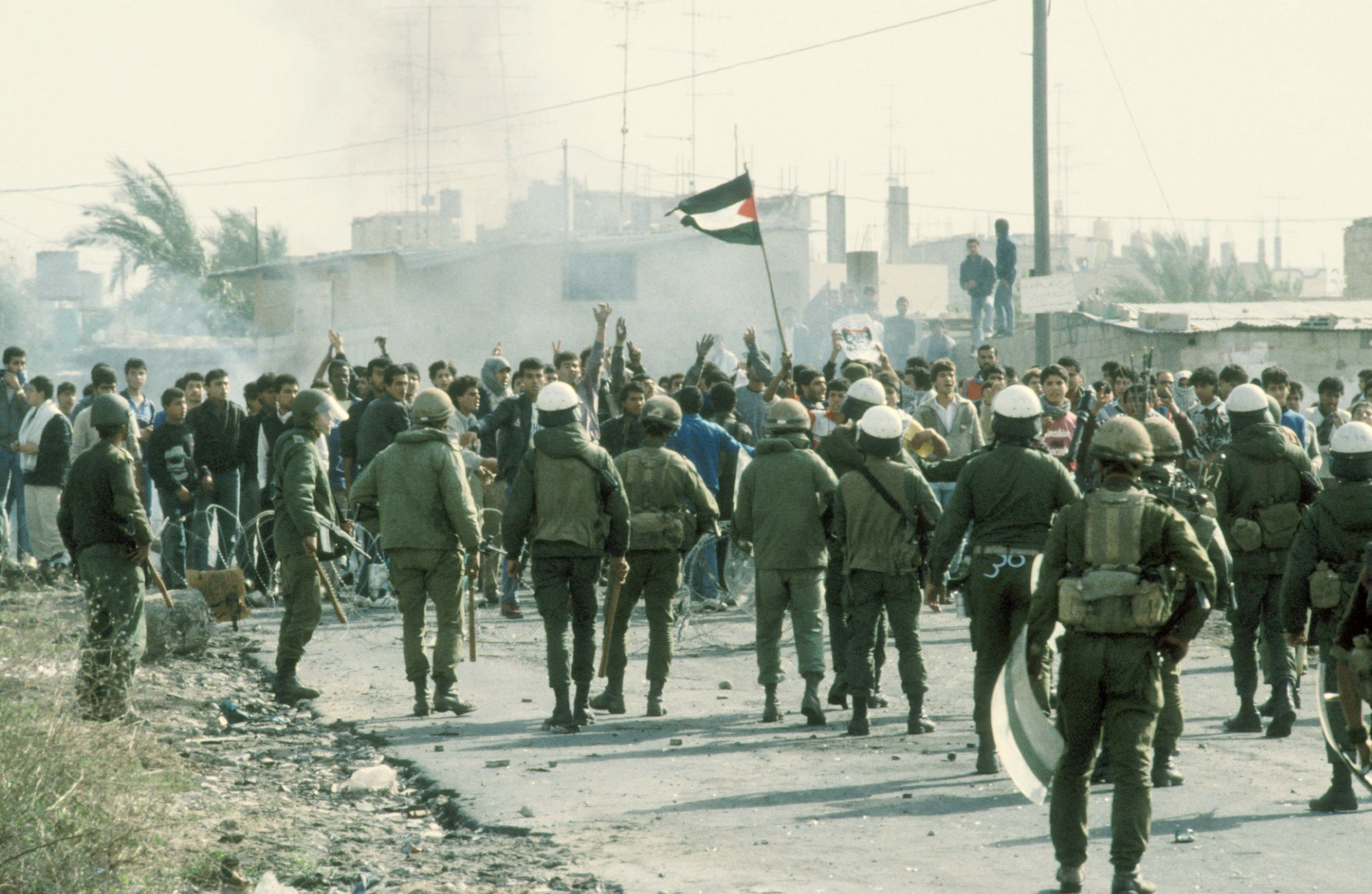
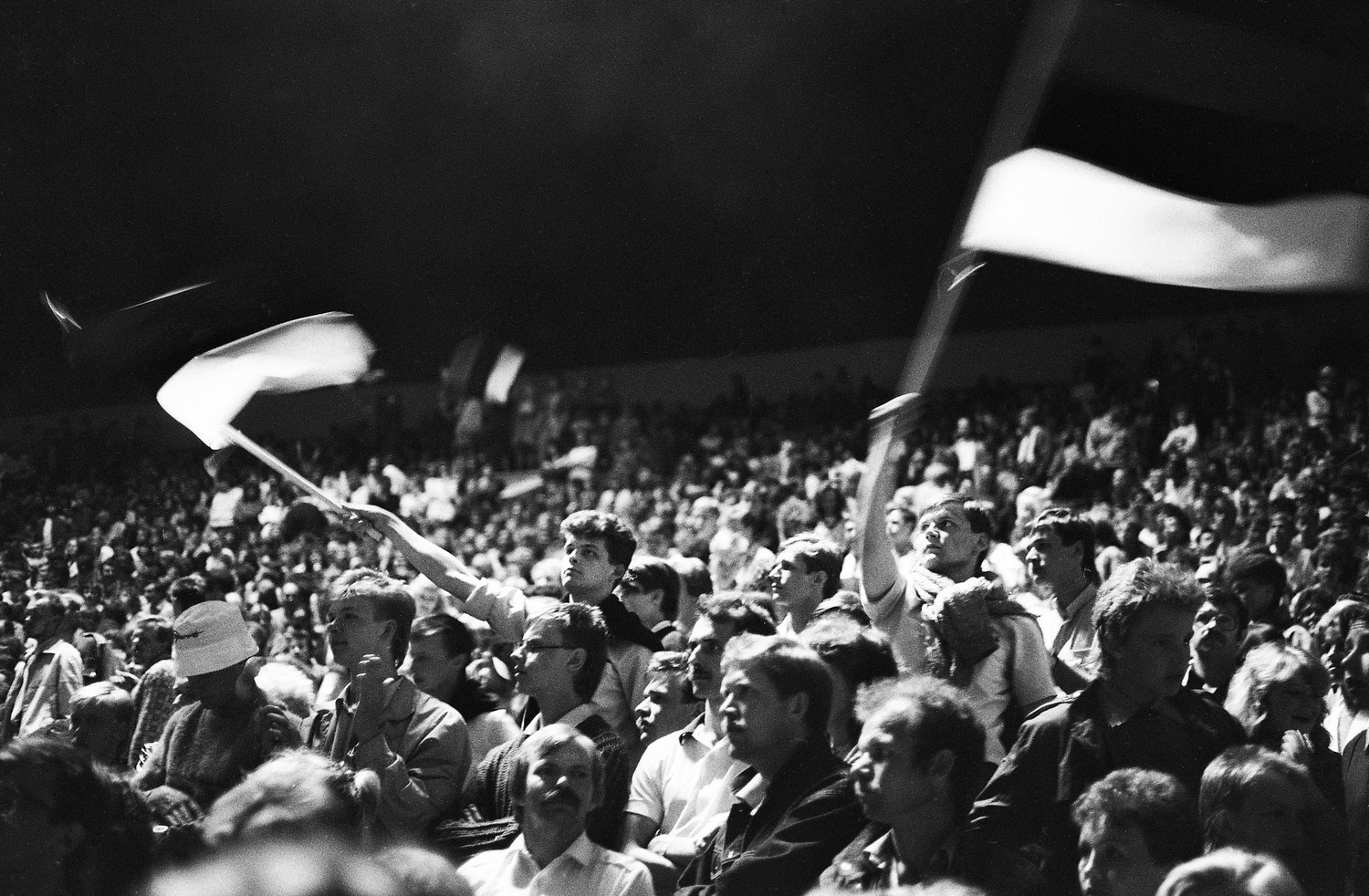
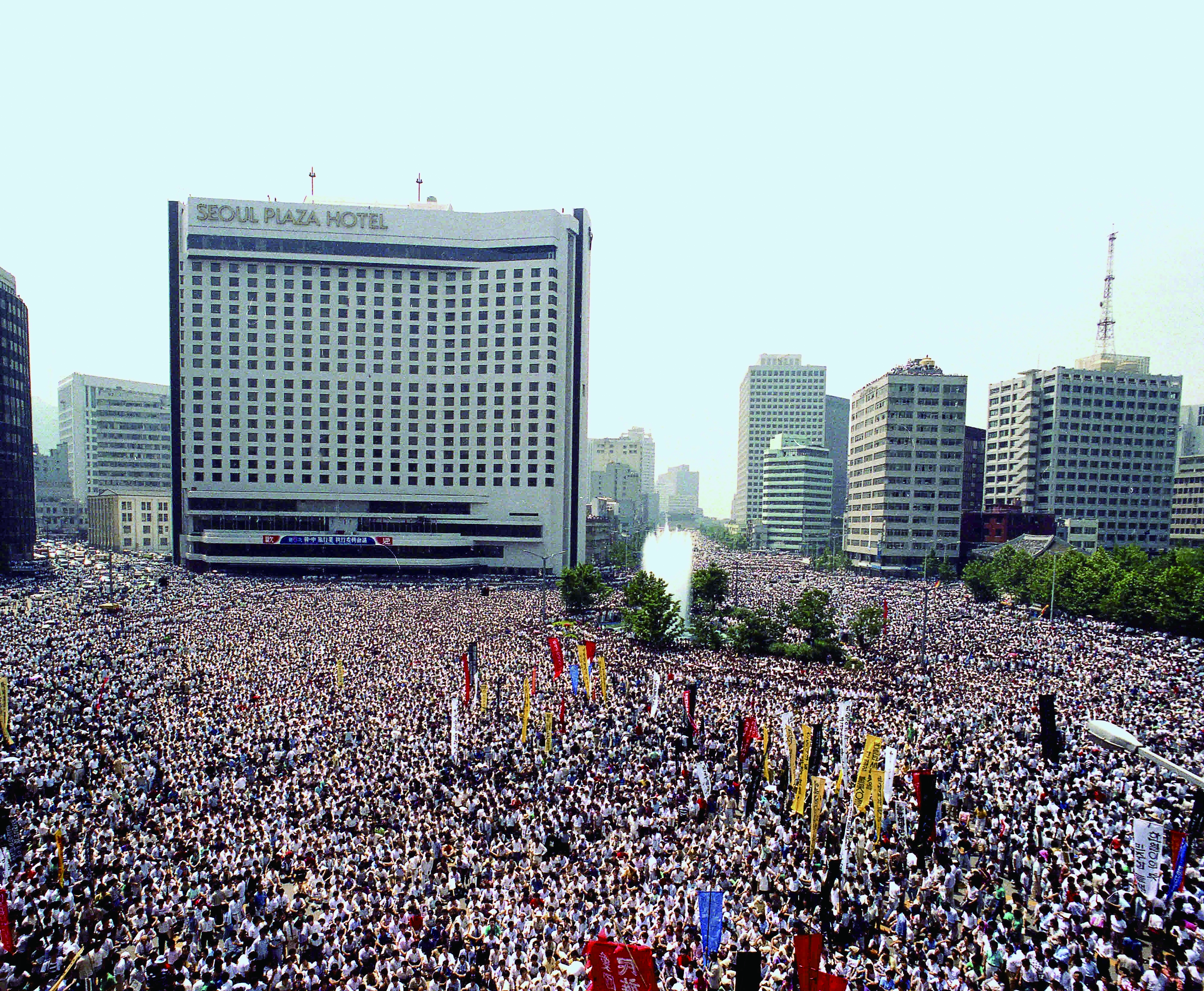
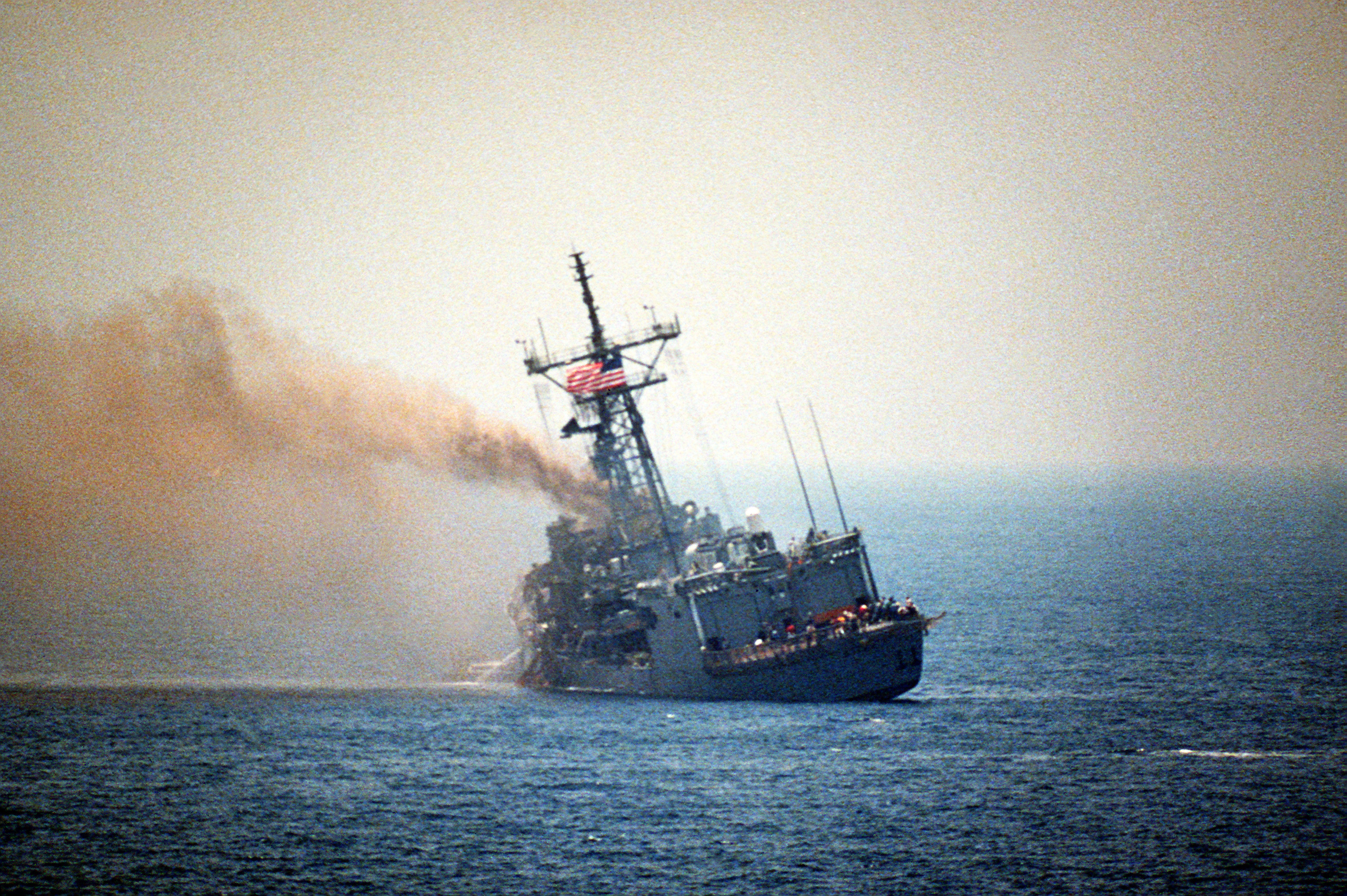
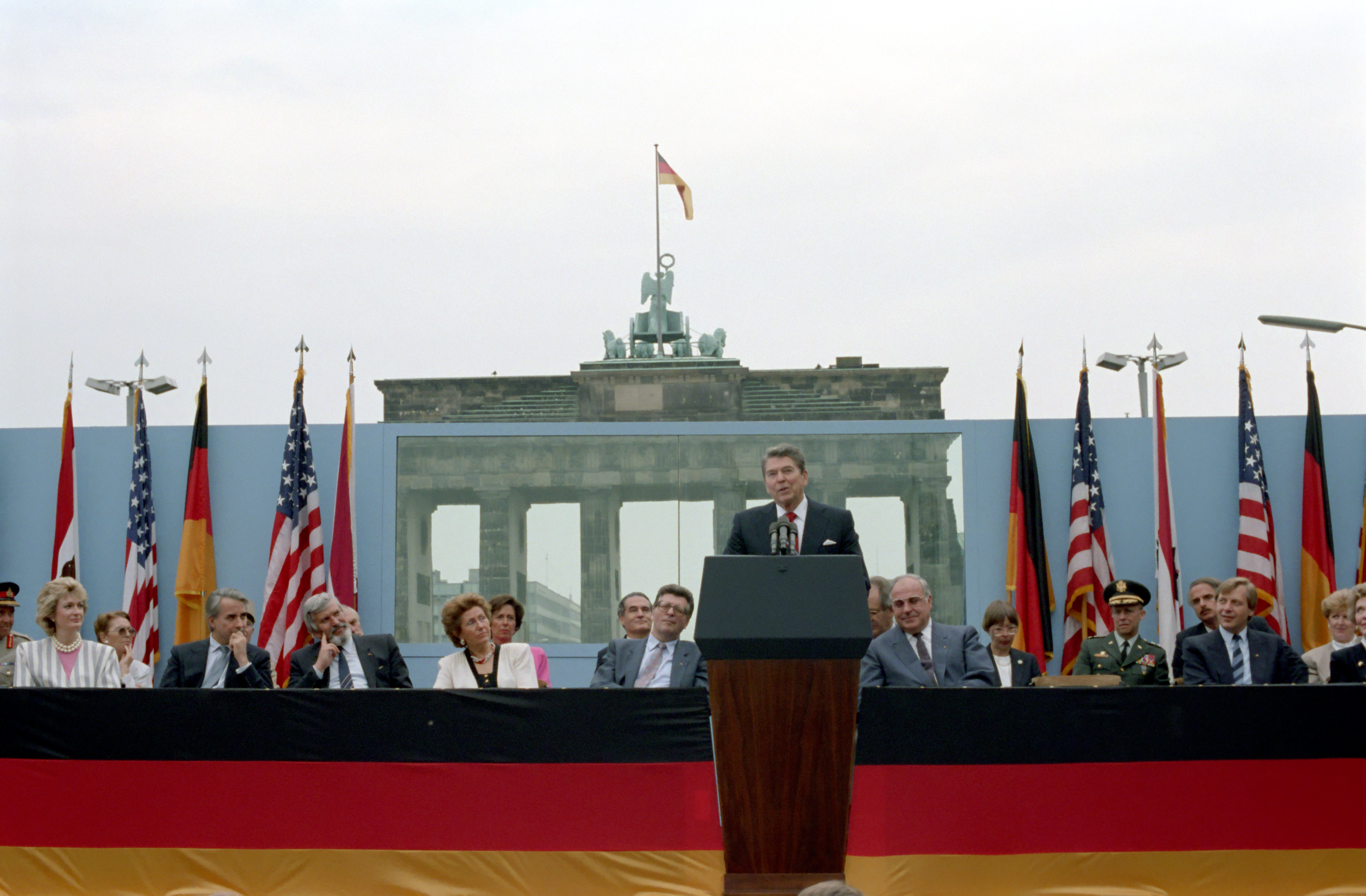
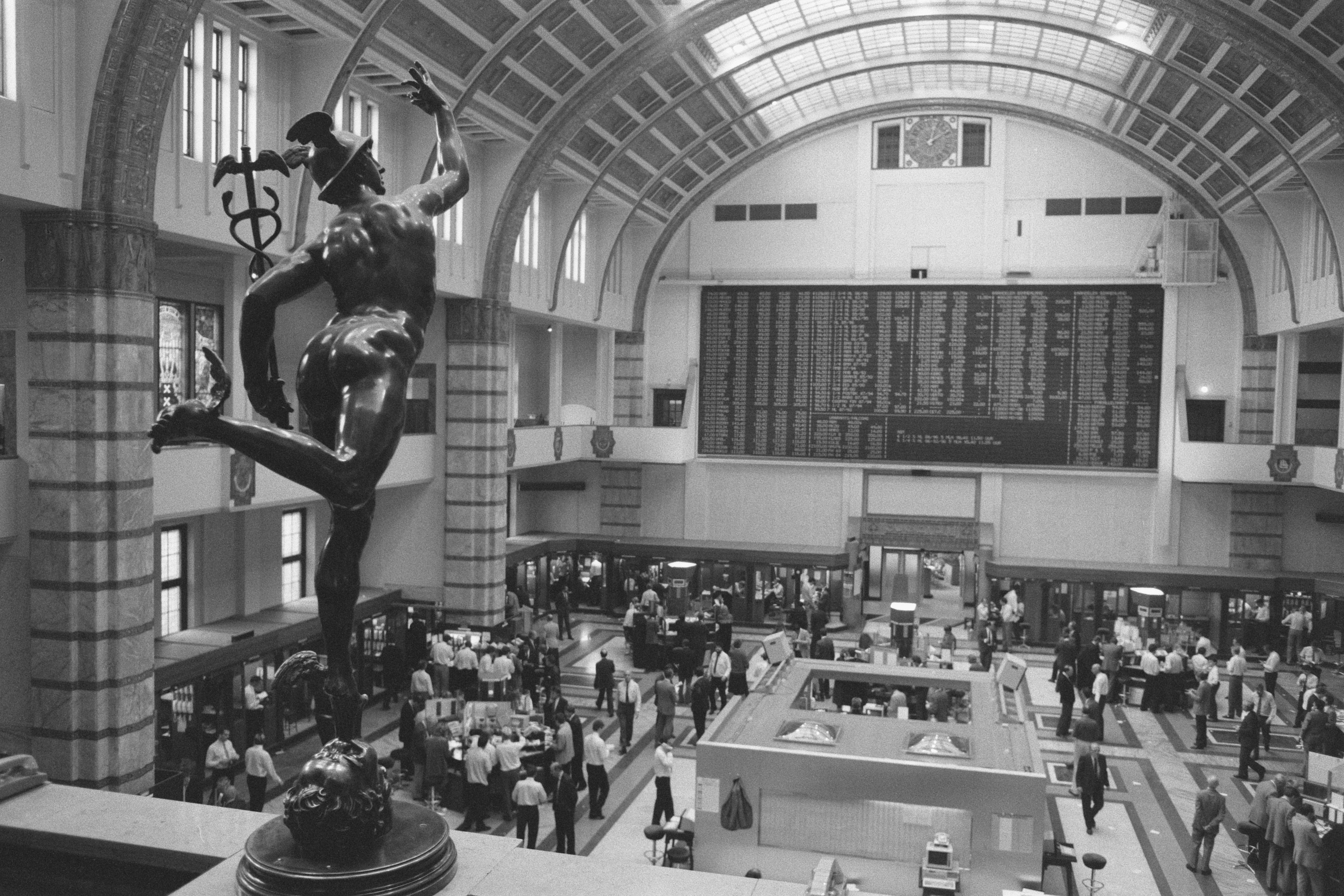
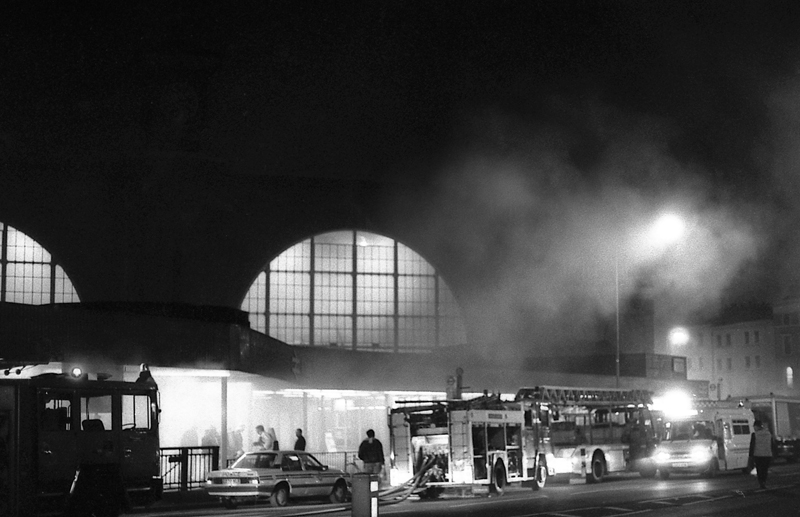
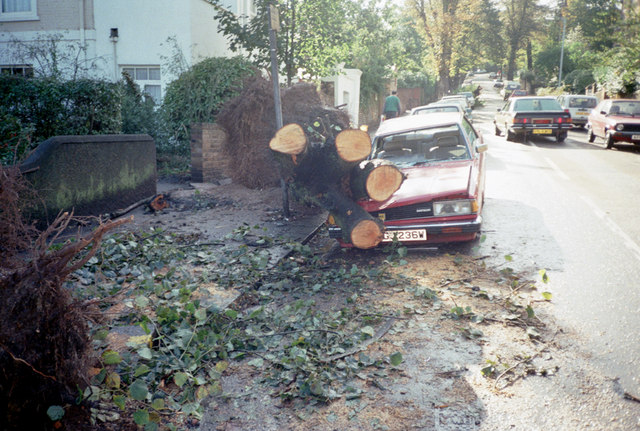
From top to bottom, left to right: the Intermediate-Range Nuclear Forces Treaty is signed by the United States and Soviet Union; the First Intifada begins; the Singing Revolution grows across the Baltic states; the June Democratic Struggle brings democratic reforms to South Korea; the USS Stark incident kills 37 U.S. sailors; Ronald Reagan delivers the Tear down this wall! speech; Black Monday triggers a major stock market crash; the King's Cross fire kills 31 people; and the Great Storm of 1987 devastates southern England.

1987 (MCMLXXXVII) was a common year starting on Thursday of the Gregorian calendar, the 1987th year of the Common Era (CE) and Anno Domini (AD) designations, the 987th year of the 2nd millennium, the 87th year of the 20th century, and the 8th year of the 1980s decade.

1987 was the last year to have four unique digits or no repeating numbers until 2013.

== Events ==
=== January ===
- January 1 – Bolivia reintroduces the Boliviano currency.
- January 2 – Chadian–Libyan conflict – Battle of Fada: The Chadian army destroys a Libyan armoured brigade.
- January 3 – Afghan leader Mohammad Najibullah says that Afghanistan's 1978 Communist revolution is "not reversible," and that any opposition parties will have to align with Communist goals.
- January 4 –
  - 1987 Maryland train collision: An Amtrak train en route from Washington, D.C. to Boston collides with Conrail engines at Chase, Maryland, United States, killing 16 people.
  - Televangelist Oral Roberts announces to his viewers that unless they donate $8 million to his ministry by March 31, God will "call [him] home."
- January 15 – Hu Yaobang, General Secretary of the Chinese Communist Party, is forced into retirement by political conservatives.
- January 16 – León Febres Cordero, president of Ecuador, is kidnapped for 11 hours by followers of imprisoned general Frank Vargas, who successfully demand the latter's release.
- January 17 – The Jumalan teatteri ("The theatre of God") theatre students' group cause a huge scandal at the Oulu City Theatre in Oulu, Finland by throwing excrement, eggs and yoghurt on the audience during their two-minute performance.
- January 20 – Terry Waite, the special envoy of the Archbishop of Canterbury in Lebanon, is kidnapped in Beirut (released November 1991).
- January 24 – 1987 Forsyth County protests: About 20,000 protestors marched in a civil rights demonstration in Forsyth County, Georgia, United States.
- January 28 – The United States establishes diplomatic relations with Mongolia.

=== February ===
- February 2 – The new Constitution of the Philippines goes into effect, which replaces the earlier Constitution instituted by Ferdinand Marcos.
- February 6 – The Soviet oil tanker Antonio Gramsci suffers a minor shipwreck in Finnish waters en route to the Neste oil refinery in Porvoo, resulting in an oil spill of approximately 570–650 tons.
- February 11
  - British Airways is privatised and listed on the London Stock Exchange.
- February 20 – A second Unabomber bomb explodes at a Salt Lake City computer store parking lot in the United States, injuring the owner's son.
- February 23 – SN 1987A, the first "naked-eye" supernova since 1604, is observed.
- February 25
  - Beginning of the Phosphorite War protest movement in the Estonian SSR.
  - The U.S. Supreme Court rules in United States v. Paradise that affirmative action is lawful if the organization in question has a history of pervasive racial discrimination in hiring practices; in this case, police departments in the state of Alabama. Justice William J. Brennan, Jr. rules that the government is "justified by a compelling governmental interest in eradicating the Department's pervasive, systematic, and obstinate discriminatory exclusion of blacks."
- February 26 – Iran–Contra affair: The Tower Commission rebukes U.S. President Ronald Reagan for not controlling his National Security Council staff.
- February 28 – A Rüppell's vulture chick is hatched at the Milwaukee County Zoo, the first time the animal has been successfully bred in North America.

=== March ===
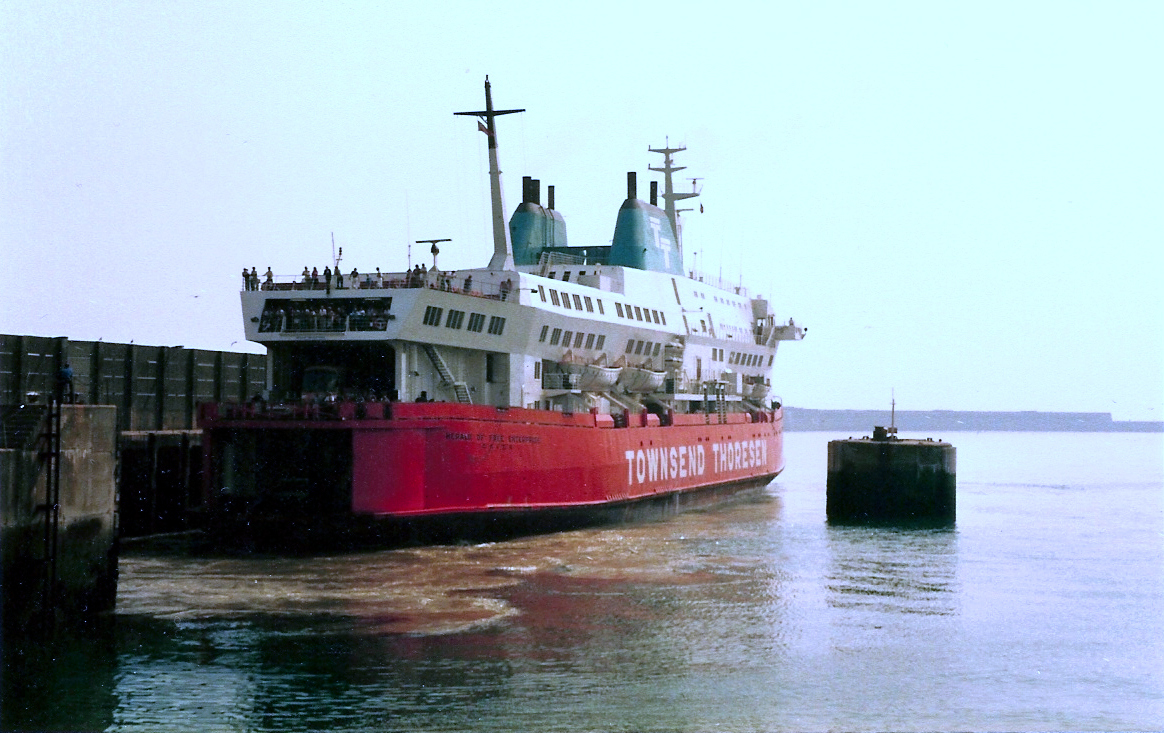
Herald of Free Enterprise before its capsizing on March 6

- March 1 – The first Starbucks outside of the US is opened in Vancouver, Canada.
- March 4 – U.S. President Ronald Reagan addresses the American people on the Iran–Contra affair, acknowledging that his overtures to Iran had "deteriorated" into an arms-for-hostages deal.
- March 6
  - A 6.9 magnitude earthquake occurs in Napo Province in northeast Ecuador, killing roughly 1,000 people.
  - Zeebrugge disaster: Roll-on/roll-off cross-channel ferry Herald of Free Enterprise capsizes off Zeebrugge harbor in Belgium; 193 people die.
- March 7 – 1987 Lieyu massacre: The Republic of China Army execute 19 unarmed Vietnamese refugees on Donggang beach, Lieyu, Kinmen off Mainland China.
- March 18 – Woodstock of physics: A marathon session of the American Physical Society's meeting features 51 presentations concerning the science of high-temperature superconductors.
- March 20 – AZT is approved by the United States Food and Drug Administration for use in the treatment of HIV/AIDS.
- March 24 – Michael Eisner, CEO of The Walt Disney Company, and French Prime Minister and future President of France, Jacques Chirac, sign an agreement to construct the 4,800 acres (19 km^{2}) Euro Disney Resort (now called Disneyland Paris) and to develop the Val d'Europe area of the new town Marne-la-Vallée in Paris, France.
- March 28 – The 1987 Aegean crisis, which occurred near the Greek island of Thasos, was a confrontation between Greece and Turkey that was ultimately resolved peacefully. Turkey agreed to withdraw its vessels under the condition of Greece not pursue oil drills beyond its territorial waters.
- March 29
  - The World Wrestling Federation (later WWE) produces WrestleMania III from the Pontiac Silverdome in Pontiac, Michigan. The event is particularly notable for the record attendance of 93,173, the largest recorded attendance for a live indoor sporting event in North America until February 14, 2010, when the 2010 NBA All-Star Game has an attendance of 108,713 at AT&T Stadium.
  - A hybrid solar eclipse is the second hybrid solar eclipse in less than one year, the first being on October 3, 1986. It is annular visible in southern Argentina, Gabon, Equatorial Guinea, Cameroon, Central African Republic, Sudan (part of the path of annularity crossed today's South Sudan), Ethiopia, Djibouti and northern Somalia and totally visible in Atlantic Ocean, lasting just 7.57 seconds.
- March 30 – The 59th Academy Awards take place in Los Angeles, with Platoon winning Best Picture.
- March 31 – Margaret Thatcher, Prime Minister of the United Kingdom, conducts a 45-minute interview on Soviet television.

=== April ===
- April 5 – Schoharie Creek Bridge Collapse: I-90 bridge collapse near Fort Hunter leaves 10 people dead. Investigators conclude that the bridge's piers had been weakened by structural flaws and significant scour. The accident leads to stricter safety standards in bridge design and inspection. The body of the 10th victim will ultimately be recovered from the Mohawk River more than two years later.
- April 13 – The governments of the Portuguese Republic and the People's Republic of China sign an agreement in which Macau will be returned to China in 1999.
- April 14 – Turkey applied for membership to the European Economic Community (now the European Union).
- April 15 – An insurrection in Sri Lanka by the Marxist–Leninist group, JVP, begins.
- April 19 – The Simpsons cartoon first appears as a series of shorts on The Tracey Ullman Show.
- April 21 – In Colombo, Sri Lanka, the Central Bus Station Bombing kills 113 civilians.
- April 27 – The United States Department of Justice declares incumbent Austrian president Kurt Waldheim an "undesirable alien".
- April 30 – Canadian Prime Minister Brian Mulroney and the Provincial Premiers agree in principle to the Meech Lake Accord which would bring Quebec into the constitution.

=== May ===
- May 4 – The U.S. Supreme Court rules in Rotary Int'l v. Rotary Club of Duarte that local Rotary Clubs do not have a constitutional right to deny membership to women. Other clubs thereafter comply with the ruling: Lions International begins admitting women in June, and Kiwanis Club in July.
- May 8 – Loughgall ambush: A 24-man unit of the British Army Special Air Service (SAS) ambushed eight members of the Provisional Irish Republican Army (IRA) as they mounted an attack on a Royal Ulster Constabulary (RUC) barracks. All IRA members were killed as well as one civilian.
- May 9 – A Soviet-made Ilyushin Il-62 airliner, operated by LOT Polish Airlines, crashes into a forest just outside Warsaw, killing all 183 people on board.
- May 11 – Klaus Barbie goes on trial in Lyon for war crimes committed during World War II.
- May 14 – Lieutenant Colonel Sitiveni Rabuka executes a bloodless coup in Fiji.
- May 17 – Iran–Iraq War: USS Stark is hit by two Iraqi-owned Exocet AM39 air-to-surface missiles killing 37 sailors.
- May 22
  - The Hashimpura massacre occurs in Meerut, India.
  - The inaugural Rugby World Cup hosted by both New Zealand and Australia kicks off. In the opening match of the new tournament, New Zealand beat Italy in the pool stage.
- May 27
  - At the Prater Stadium of Vienna, Porto of Portugal defeats Bayern München of West Germany 2–1 and wins its first European Cup.
  - In one of the densest concentrations of humanity in history, a crowd of 800,000+ packed shoulder-to-shoulder onto the Golden Gate Bridge and its approaches for its 50th Anniversary celebration.
- May 28 – Eighteen-year-old West German pilot Mathias Rust evades Soviet air defenses and lands a private plane on Red Square in Moscow. He is immediately detained (released on August 3, 1988).

=== June ===
- June 3 – The Vanuatu Labour Party is founded.
- June 8 – The New Zealand Nuclear Free Zone, Disarmament, and Arms Control Act is passed, the first of its kind in the world.
- June 11 – The Conservative Party of the United Kingdom, led by Margaret Thatcher, is re-elected for a third term at the 1987 general election.
- June 12 – During a visit to Berlin, Germany, U.S. President Ronald Reagan challenges Soviet general secretary Mikhail Gorbachev to tear down the Berlin Wall.
- June 13 – At the Paris Air Show, Boeing announces the sale of their 1,842nd Boeing 737, making the 737 the best-selling airliner of all time.
- June 17 – With the death of the last known individual, the dusky seaside sparrow, a subspecies native to the US state of Florida, becomes extinct.
- June 19
  - Teddy Seymour is officially designated the first black man to sail around the world, when he completes his solo sailing circumnavigation in Frederiksted, St. Croix, of the United States Virgin Islands.
  - Edwards v. Aguillard: The Supreme Court of the United States rules that a Louisiana law requiring that creation science be taught in public schools whenever evolution is taught is unconstitutional.
  - Hipercor bombing: the Basque terrorist group ETA perpetrate a car-bomb attack at an Hipercor market in Barcelona, killing 21 and wounding 45.
- June 20 – New Zealand wins the inaugural Rugby World Cup after beating France in the final.
- June 27 – A commercial HS 748 (Philippine Airlines Flight 206) crashes near Baguio, Philippines, killing 50.
- June 28
  - Iraqi warplanes drop mustard-gas bombs on the Iranian town of Sardasht in two separate bombing rounds, on four residential areas. This is the first time a civilian town has been targeted by chemical weapons.
  - An accidental explosion at the Hohenfels Training Area in West Germany kills 3 U.S. troops.
- June 29 – South Korean politician, presidential candidate of the ruling party Roh Tae-woo makes a speech promising a wide program of nationwide reforms, the result of the June Democracy Movement.
- June 30 – Canada introduces a one-dollar coin, nicknamed the "Loonie".

=== July ===
- July 1 – The Single European Act is passed by the European Community.
- July 3 – Greater Manchester Police in England recover the body of 16-year-old Pauline Reade from Saddleworth Moor, after her killers Ian Brady and Myra Hindley help them in their search, almost exactly 24 years since Pauline was last seen alive.
- July 4 – A court in Lyon sentences former Gestapo boss Klaus Barbie to life imprisonment for crimes against humanity.
- July 8 – A Delta Air Lines L-1011 strays 60 miles off course and nearly collides with a Continental Airlines 747 over the Atlantic Ocean. The two planes are carrying nearly 600 total passengers and may have come within 100 feet of each other.
- July 11
  - 1987 Australian federal election: Bob Hawke's Labor government is re-elected with an increased majority, defeating the Liberal Party led by John Howard and the National Party led by Ian Sinclair.
  - World population is estimated to have reached five billion people, according to the United Nations.
- July 15 – Martial law in Taiwan ends after 38 years.
- July 17 – The Dow Jones Industrial Average closes above the 2,500 mark for the first time, at 2,510.04.
- July 22 – Palestinian cartoonist Naji Salim al-Ali is shot in London; he dies August 28.
- July 23 – The United States Census Bureau reports the biggest population gains in metropolitan U.S. areas of over 1 million people since 1980: Phoenix (population increase of 26%); Dallas-Fort Worth (+25%); Atlanta (+20%); San Antonio (+19%) Tampa-Saint Petersburg (+19%); San Diego (+18%); Sacramento (+17%); and Houston (+17%). The largest population losses were in Rust Belt cities: Detroit, Pittsburgh, and Cleveland.
- July 25 – The East Lancashire Railway, a heritage railway in the North West of England, is opened between Bury and Ramsbottom.
- July 27 – Salvage dives begin on the wreck of the Titanic; survivor Eva Hart likens the salvage teams to "vultures."
- July 31
  - Four hundred pilgrims are killed in clashes between demonstrating Iranian pilgrims and Saudi Arabian security forces in Mecca.
  - Docklands Light Railway in London, the first driverless railway in Great Britain, is formally opened by Queen Elizabeth II.
  - An F4-rated tornado devastates eastern Edmonton, Alberta; hardest hit are an industrial park and a trailer park. 27 people are killed and hundreds injured, with hundreds more left homeless and jobless.

=== August ===
- August 4
  - The World Commission on Environment and Development, also known as the Brundtland Commission, publishes its report, Our Common Future.
  - The Federal Communications Commission rescinds the Fairness Doctrine, which had required radio and television stations to present alternative views on controversial issues.
- August 7
  - The Colombian frigate Caldas enters Venezuelan waters near the Los Monjes Archipelago, sparking the Caldas frigate crisis between both nations.
  - American Lynne Cox becomes the first person to swim the Bering Strait, crossing from Little Diomede Island to Big Diomede in 2 hours and 5 minutes.
- August 9 – Hoddle Street massacre in Australia: Julian Knight, 19, goes on a shooting rampage in the Melbourne suburb of Clifton Hill, Victoria, killing 7 people and injuring 19 before surrendering to police.
- August 11 – Apple introduces Hypercard, a precursor to the World Wide Web.
- August 14
  - All the children held at Kai Lama, a rural property on Lake Eildon, Australia, run by the Santiniketan Park Association, are released after a police raid.
  - Angolan Civil War: The Battle of Cuito Cuanavale begins in Angola and further intensifies the South African Border War.
- August 15 – Great Basin National Park is dedicated; it is the 49th national park in the United States and the first in the state of Nevada.
- August 16
  - Northwest Airlines Flight 255 (a McDonnell Douglas MD-82) crashes on takeoff from Detroit Metropolitan Airport in Romulus, Michigan, just west of Detroit, killing all but one (4-year-old Cecelia Cichan) of the 156 people on board.
  - The followers of the Harmonic Convergence claim it is observed around the world.
- August 17 – Rudolf Hess is found dead in his cell in Spandau Prison. Hess, 93, is believed to have committed suicide by hanging himself with an electrical flex. He was the last remaining prisoner at the complex, which is soon to be demolished.
- August 19
  - Hungerford massacre: Sixteen people die in an apparently motiveless mass shooting in the United Kingdom, carried out by Michael Ryan.
  - ABC News' chief Middle East correspondent Charles Glass escapes his Hezbollah kidnappers in Beirut, Lebanon, after 62 days in captivity.
  - The Order of the Garter is opened to women.
- August 22 – The Parliament of Zimbabwe votes to eliminate the 20 seats reserved for the white minority.
- August 23 – The Hirvepark meeting is organized as the first unsanctioned political meeting in Estonian Soviet Socialist Republic, in commemoration of the Molotov–Ribbentrop Pact.
- August 24 – Mozert v. Hawkins decision: The U.S. Sixth Circuit Court of Appeals rules that the class readings assigned by public schools in Hawkins County, Tennessee do not violate Christian students' First Amendment rights.
- August 26 – Smith v. Board of School Commissioners of Mobile County decision: The U.S. Eleventh Circuit Court of Appeals overturns the earlier ruling of a lower court which found that certain public school textbooks promoted the "religion" of secular humanism; in this final ruling, the court finds that the plaintiffs have not proven that the state is presenting secular humanism as a religious ideology.
- August 31 – Michael Jackson releases Bad, his first studio album since Thriller, the best-selling album of all time. The album would produce five number one singles in the US, a record which has not been broken.

=== September ===
- September 1 – Honda announces plans to build a second U.S. assembly plant, the East Liberty Auto Plant.
- September 2 – In Moscow, USSR, the trial begins for 19-year-old pilot Mathias Rust, who flew his Cessna airplane into Red Square in May.
- September 3 – In a coup d'état in Burundi, President Jean-Baptiste Bagaza is deposed by Major Pierre Buyoya.
- September 4 – In a village in Rajasthan, an 18-year-old widow, Roop Kanwar is burned alive on her husband's funeral pyre, in a banned practice known as Sati. Though the woman's father-in-law is arrested by authorities, thousands of Hindu pilgrims travel to the cremation site in support of the act.
- September 7–21 – The world's first conference on artificial life is held at Los Alamos National Laboratory in the United States.
- September 7 – Erich Honecker makes a visit to Bonn, the first (and last) visit by an East German head of state to West Germany.
- September 11 – Chadian–Libyan War: Chad and Libya sign a ceasefire under supervision of the Organisation of African Unity, officially ending the 14-year territorial conflict. Sporadic fighting will continue.
- September 13 – Goiânia accident: Metal scrappers open an old radiation source abandoned in a hospital in Goiânia, Brazil, causing the worst radiation accident ever in an urban area.
- September 23 – The United States and Poland agree to exchange ambassadors after a four-year break in relations.

=== October ===
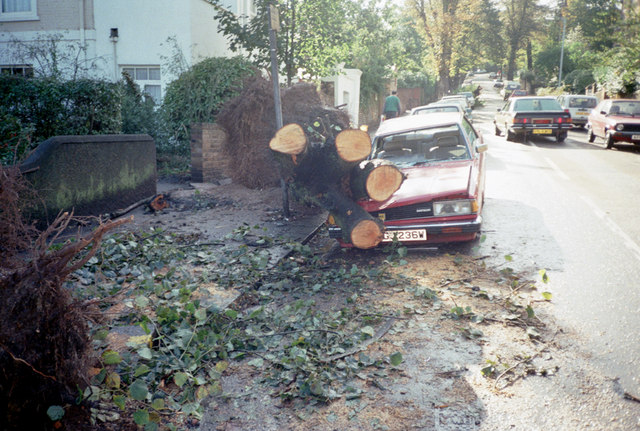
October 16: aftermath of the Great Storm of 1987

Performance of the Dow Jones Industrial Index during Black Monday, October 19

- October 3 – The Canada–United States Free Trade Agreement is reached but still requires ratification. This agreement would be a precursor to NAFTA.
- October 6 – Fiji becomes a republic.
- October 7
  - Sikh nationalists declare the independence of Khalistan from India.
  - The U.S. Department of Education announces new guidelines for teaching about AIDS in public schools, emphasizing the importance of abstinence and "appropriate moral and social conduct."
- October 8 – Gaddafi announces that Algeria and Libya have "agreed in principle" to a proposed union of the two states, which Gaddafi suggests should be named "Algibya."
- October 8–November 8 – The 1987 Cricket World Cup is held in India and Pakistan with Australia defeating England in the final.
- October 15 – In Burkina Faso, a military coup is orchestrated by Blaise Compaoré against incumbent President Thomas Sankara.
- October 15–16 – The Great storm of 1987 strikes southern Great Britain and northwestern France. It is one of the strongest storms to affect the region in the past 200 years.
- October 19
  - Black Monday: Stock market levels fall sharply on Wall Street and around the world.
  - Operation Earnest Will: US warships destroy two Iranian oil platforms in the Persian Gulf.
  - Two commuter trains collide head-on on the outskirts of Jakarta, Indonesia; 102 are killed.
- October 22 – The pilot of a British Aerospace BAE Harrier GR5 registered ZD325 accidentally ejects from his aircraft. The jet continues to fly until it runs out of fuel and crashes into the Irish Sea.
- October 23
  - British champion jockey Lester Piggott is jailed for three years after being convicted of tax evasion.
  - On a vote of 58–42, the United States Senate rejects President Ronald Reagan's nomination of Robert Bork to the Supreme Court.
- October 25 – The Minnesota Twins won 4 games to 3 in the 1987 World Series against the St. Louis Cardinals.

=== November ===
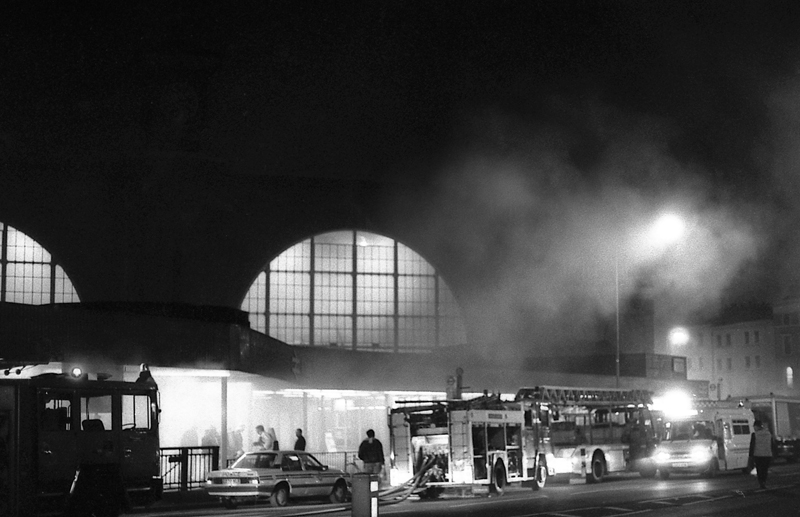
November 18: King's Cross St Pancras tube station catches fire

- November 1 – The InterCity 125 breaks the world speed record for a diesel-powered train, reaching 238 km/h (147.88 mph).
- November 7
  - Zine El Abidine Ben Ali assumes the Presidency of Tunisia.
  - The Soviet Union celebrates the 70th Anniversary of The October Revolution with a Parade on Moscow's Red Square.
  - Mass Rapid Transit (MRT) system in Singapore opens for passenger service.
- November 8 – Enniskillen bombing: Twelve people are killed by a Provisional Irish Republican Army bomb at a Remembrance Day service at Enniskillen.
- November 12 – The first Kentucky Fried Chicken restaurant in Mainland China opens in Beijing, near Tiananmen Square.
- November 15 – In Brașov, Romania, workers rebel against the communist regime led by Nicolae Ceaușescu.
- November 16 – The Parlatino Treaty of Institutionalization is signed.
- November 17 – A tsunami hits the Gulf of Alaska.
- November 18
  - The King's Cross fire on the London Underground kills 31 people and injures a further 100.
  - Iran–Contra affair: U.S. Senate and House panels release reports charging President Ronald Reagan with 'ultimate responsibility' for the affair.
- November 22 – Max Headroom broadcast signal intrusion – unknown perpetrators hijack the signal of WGN-TV for about 20 seconds, and WTTW for about 90 seconds, and displays a video of a man in a Max Headroom mask.
- November 25 – Category 5 Typhoon Nina smashes the Philippines with 265 kilometres per hour (165 mph) winds and a devastating storm surge, causing destruction and 812 deaths.
- November 28 – South African Airways Flight 295 crashes into the Indian Ocean off Mauritius, due to a fire in the cargo hold; the 159 passengers and crew perish.
- November 29 – Korean Air Flight 858 is blown up over the Andaman Sea, killing 115 crew and passengers. North Korean agents are responsible for the bombing.

=== December ===
- December 1
  - NASA announces the names of 4 companies awarded contracts to help build Space Station Freedom: Boeing Aerospace, General Electric's Astro-Space Division, McDonnell Douglas, and the Rocketdyne Division of Rockwell.
- December 7 – Pacific Southwest Airlines Flight 1771 crashes near Paso Robles, California, United States, killing all 43 on board, after a disgruntled passenger shoots his ex-supervisor on the flight, then shoots both pilots.
- December 8
  - Israeli–Palestinian conflict: The First Intifada begins in the Gaza Strip and West Bank.
  - The Intermediate-Range Nuclear Forces Treaty is signed in Washington, D.C. by U.S. President Ronald Reagan and Soviet leader Mikhail Gorbachev. It expired in 2019.
  - Alianza Lima air disaster: A Peruvian Navy Fokker F27 crashes near Ventanilla, Peru, killing 43.
- December 9 – General Rahimuddin Khan retires from the Pakistan Army, along with the cabinet of the country's military dictatorship.
- December 15 – Production I.G is founded by Mitsuhisa Ishikawa and Takayuki Goto.
- December 17 – Gustáv Husák resigns as General Secretary of the Communist Party of Czechoslovakia.
- December 20 – In history's worst peacetime sea disaster, the passenger ferry Doña Paz sinks after colliding with the oil tanker Vector 1 in the Tablas Strait in the Philippines, killing an estimated 4,000 people (1,749 official).
- December 21 – Turgut Özal of ANAP forms the new government of Turkey (46th government).
- December 22 – In Zimbabwe, the political parties ZANU and ZAPU reach an agreement that ends the violence in the Matabeleland region known as the Gukurahundi.
- December 23 – Nikki Sixx, Mötley Crüe's bassist overdoses on heroin and is declared clinically dead for two minutes before a paramedic revives him with two syringes full of adrenaline.
- December 30 – Pope John Paul II issues the encyclical Sollicitudo rei socialis (On Social Concern).

== Births ==
=== January ===
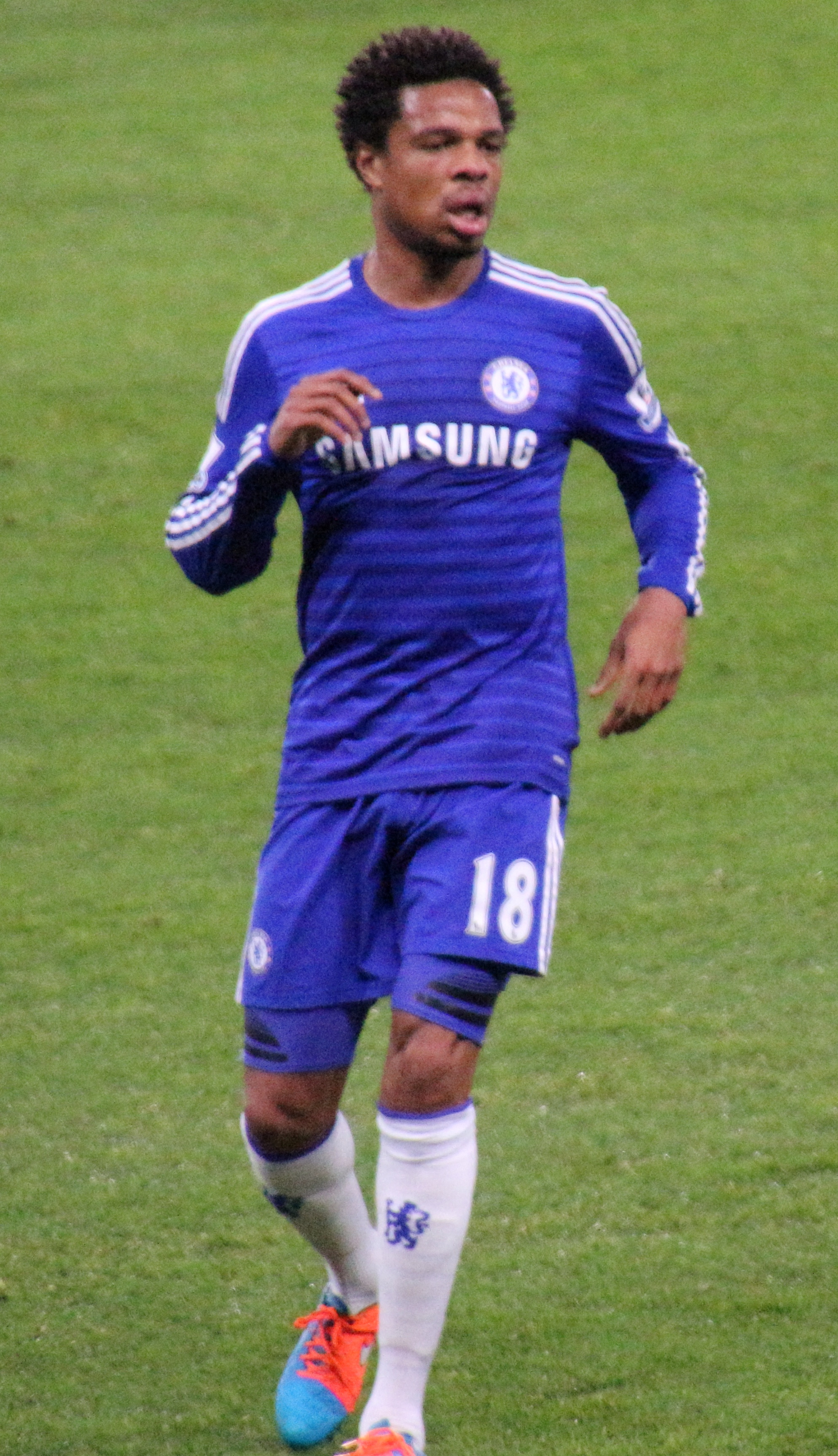
Loïc Rémy

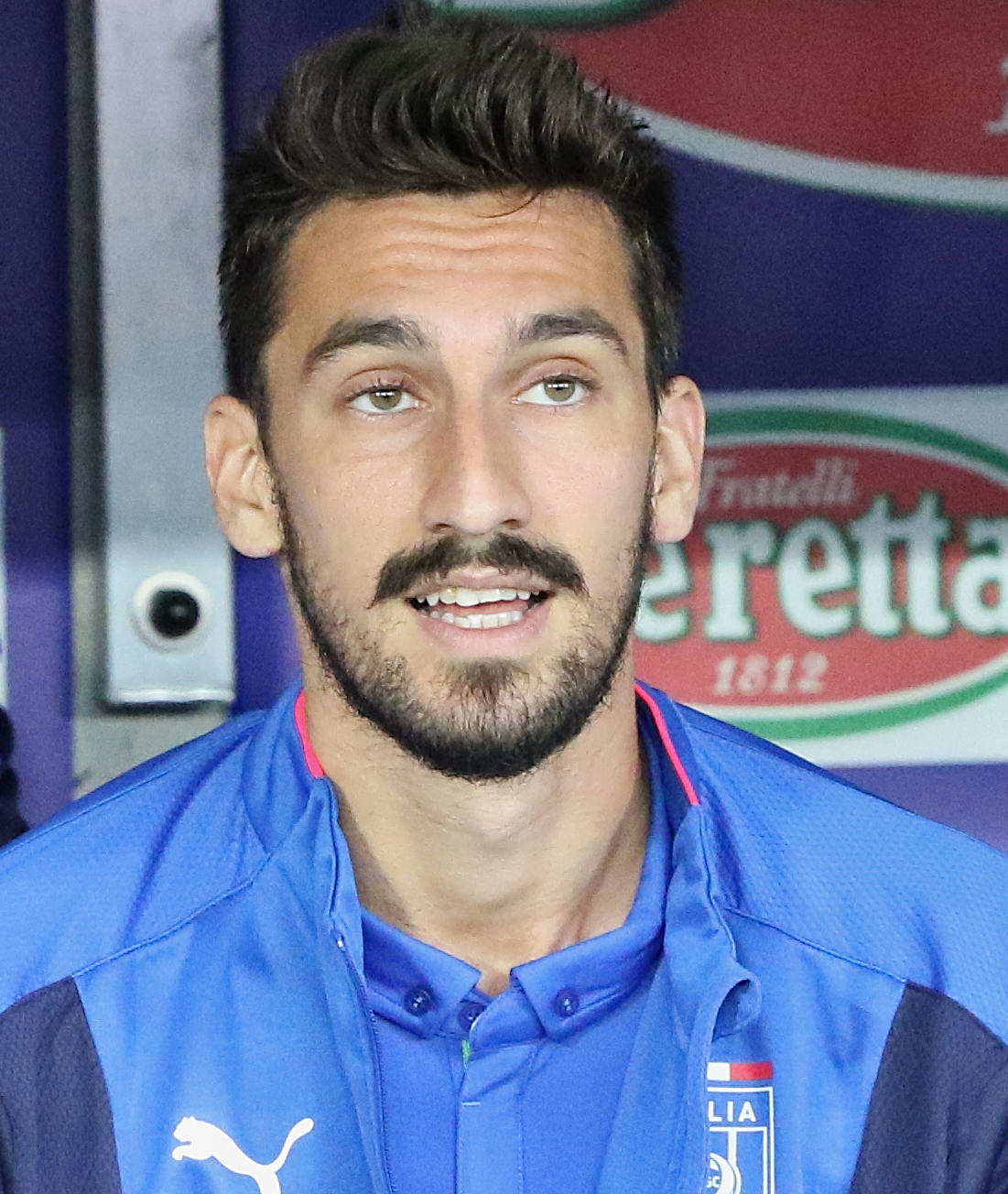
Davide Astori

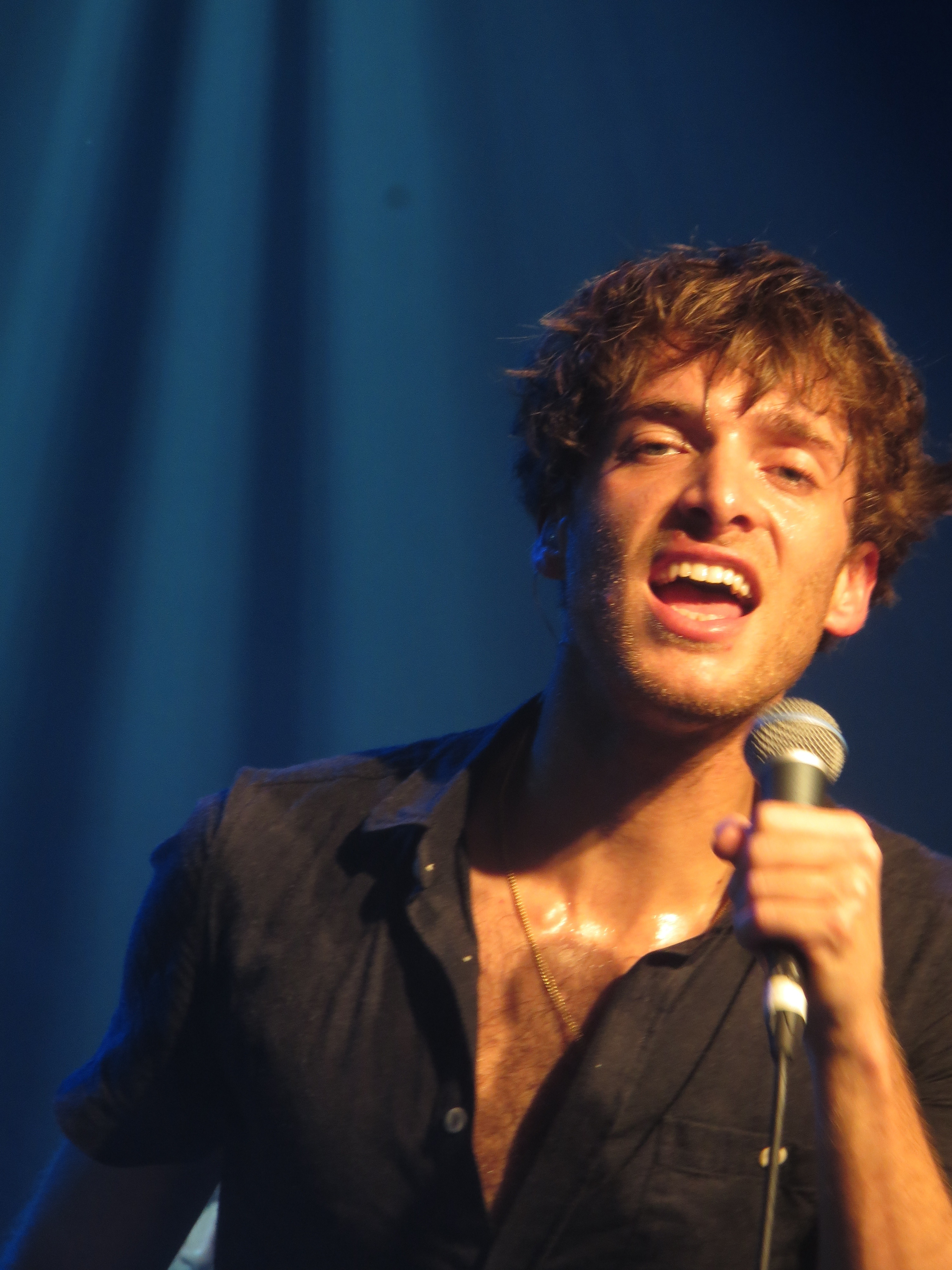
Paolo Nutini

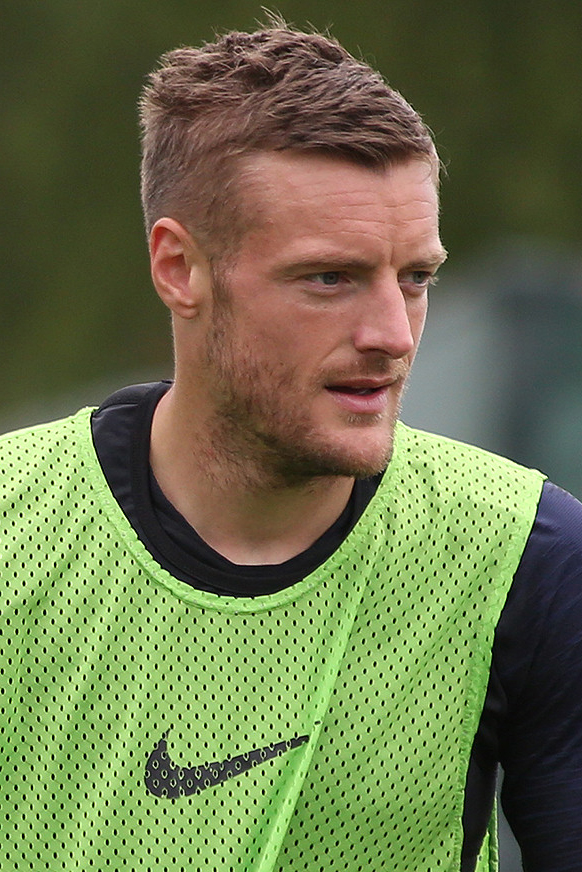
Jamie Vardy

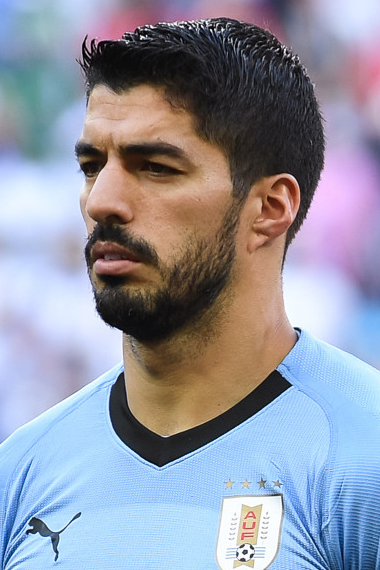
Luis Suárez

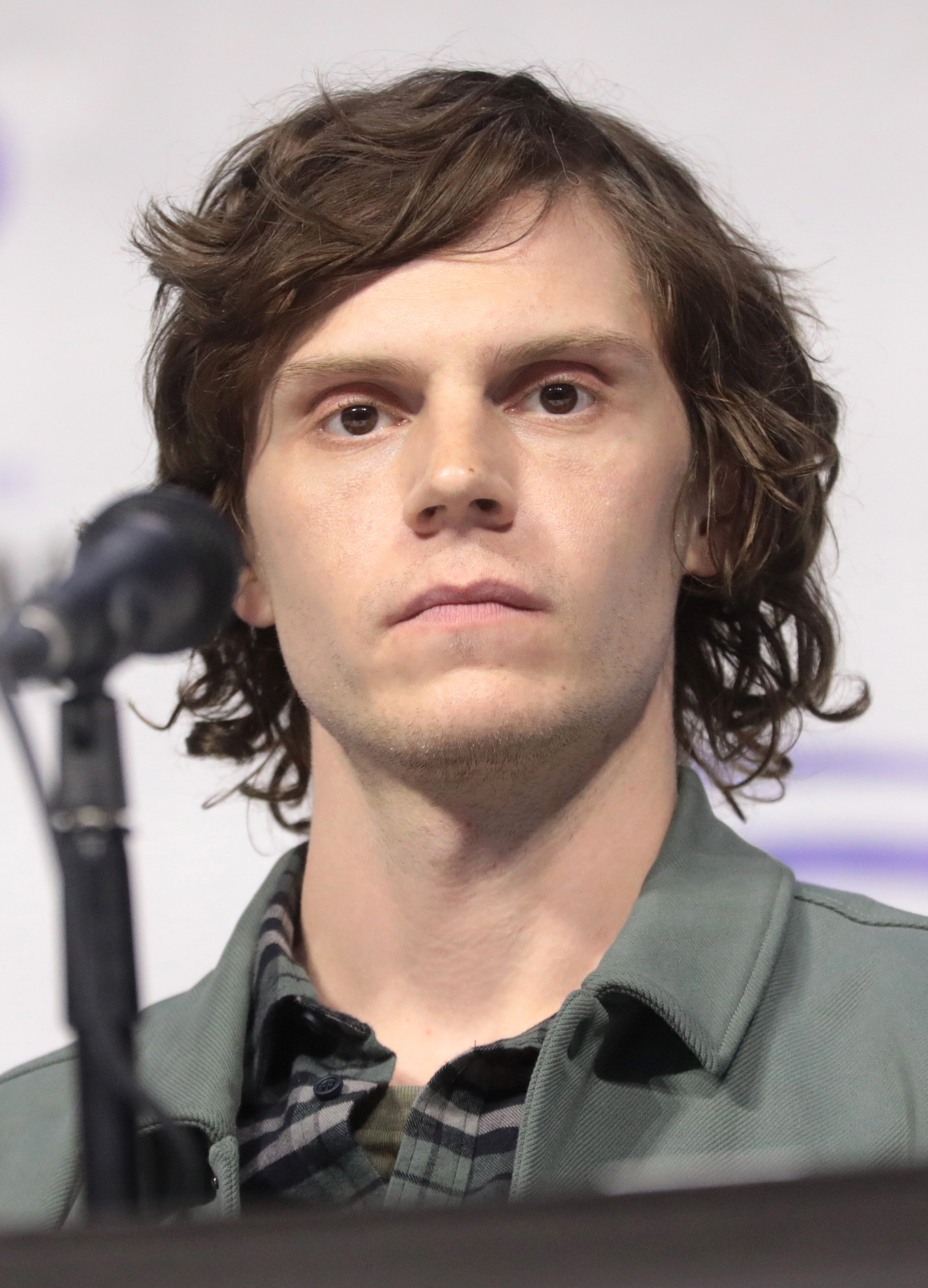
Evan Peters

- January 1 – Meryl Davis, American figure skater
- January 2
  - Shelley Hennig, American actress and model
  - Loïc Rémy, French professional footballer
- January 5
  - Kristin Cavallari, American actress, fashion designer, and author
  - Brian Mushana Kwesiga – Ugandan-born entrepreneur, engineer, and civic leader
  - Jason Mitchell, American actor
- January 6 – Zhang Lin, Chinese swimmer
- January 7
  - Zaraah Abrahams, English actress
  - Davide Astori, Italian footballer (d. 2018)
  - Lyndsy Fonseca, American actress
  - Sirusho, Armenian singer
- January 8 – Freddie Stroma, English actor and model
- January 9
  - Lucas Leiva, Brazilian football player
  - Paolo Nutini, Scottish singer
  - Pablo Santos, Mexican actor (d. 2006)
- January 10 – César Cielo, Brazilian swimmer
- January 11 – Jamie Vardy, English footballer
- January 12 – Naya Rivera, American actress and singer (d. 2020)
- January 14
  - Dennis Aogo, German footballer
  - Kosala Jayaweera, Sri Lankan politician (d. 2025)
- January 15
  - Greg Inglis, Australian rugby league player
  - Tsegaye Kebede, Ethiopian long-distance runner
  - Kelly Kelly, American professional wrestler
  - Michael Seater, Canadian actor, director, screenwriter, and producer
- January 17 – Oleksandr Usyk, Ukrainian boxer
- January 18 – Johan Djourou, Ivorian born-Swiss footballer
- January 19 – Arkadiy Vasilyev, Russian decathlete
- January 20
  - Robert Farah, Colombian tennis player
  - Evan Peters, American actor
  - Marco Simoncelli, Italian motorcycle road racer (d. 2011)
  - Serguey Torres, Cuban canoeist
- January 21 – Pablo Caballero González, Uruguayan footballer
- January 22
  - Ray Rice, American football player
  - Shane Long, Irish footballer
  - Astrid Uhrenholdt Jacobsen, Norwegian cross-country skier and Olympic gold medalist
- January 24
  - Ruth Bradley, Irish television and film actress
  - Wayne Hennessey, Welsh football player
  - Luis Suárez, Uruguayan football player
- January 26
  - Sebastian Giovinco, Italian football player
  - Gojko Kačar, Serbian footballer
- January 27 – Hannah Teter, American snowboarder
- January 28 – Jacek Krasicki, Polish music producer aka. DekoderBeats
- January 29 – José Abreu, Cuban baseball player
- January 30
  - Becky Lynch, Irish professional wrestler
  - Arda Turan, Turkish footballer

=== February ===
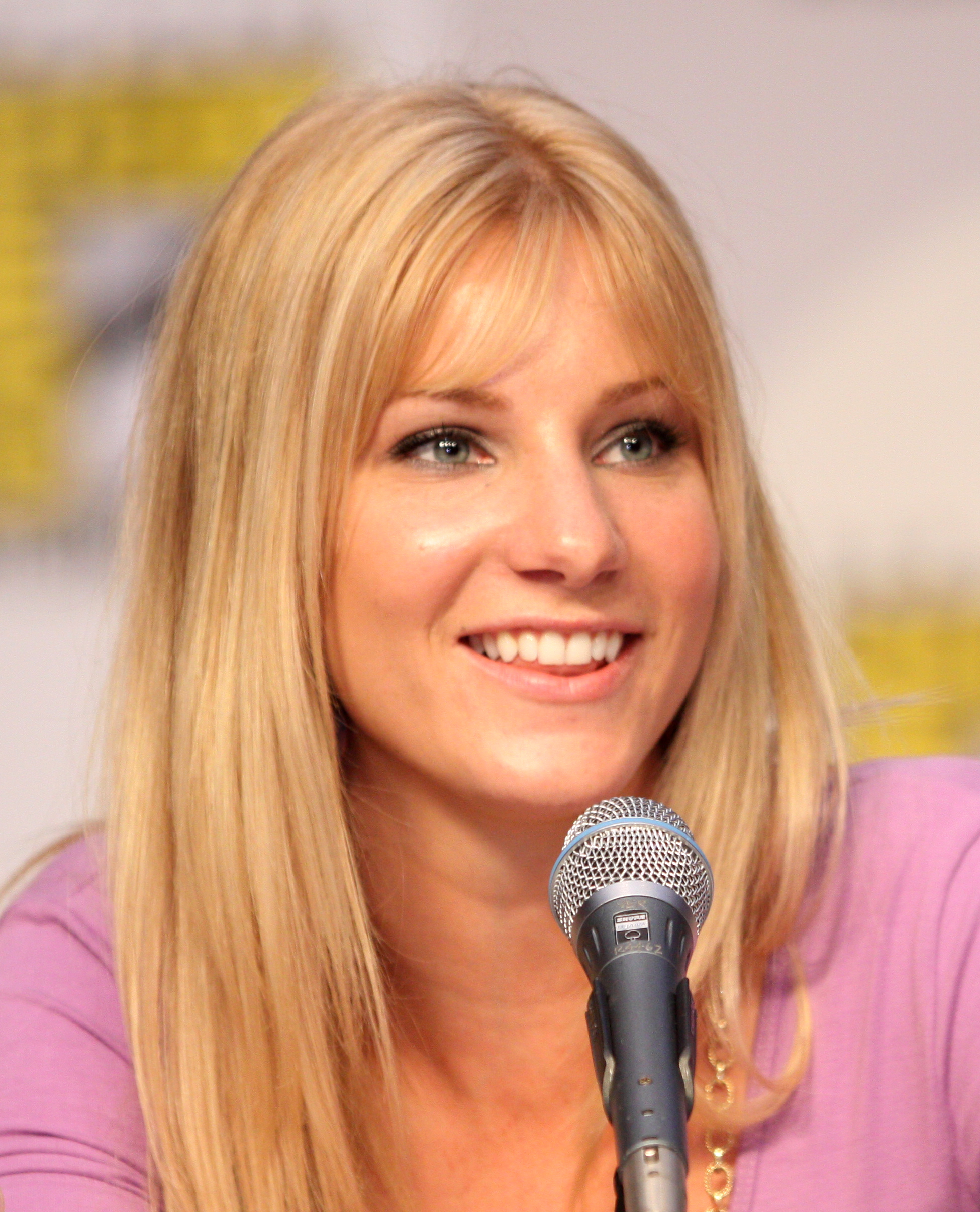
Heather Morris

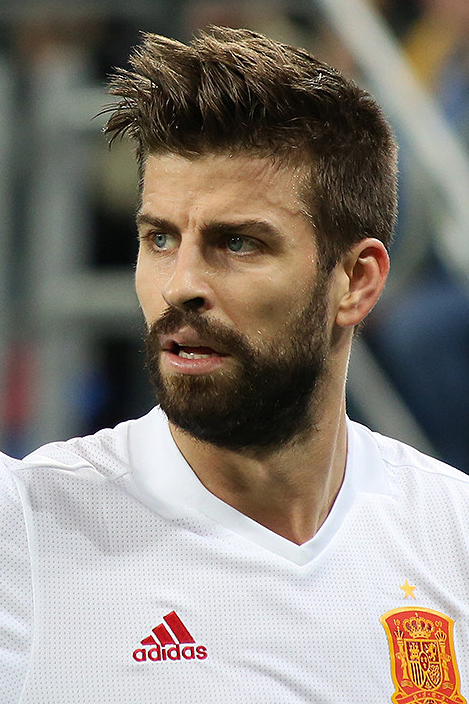
Gerard Piqué

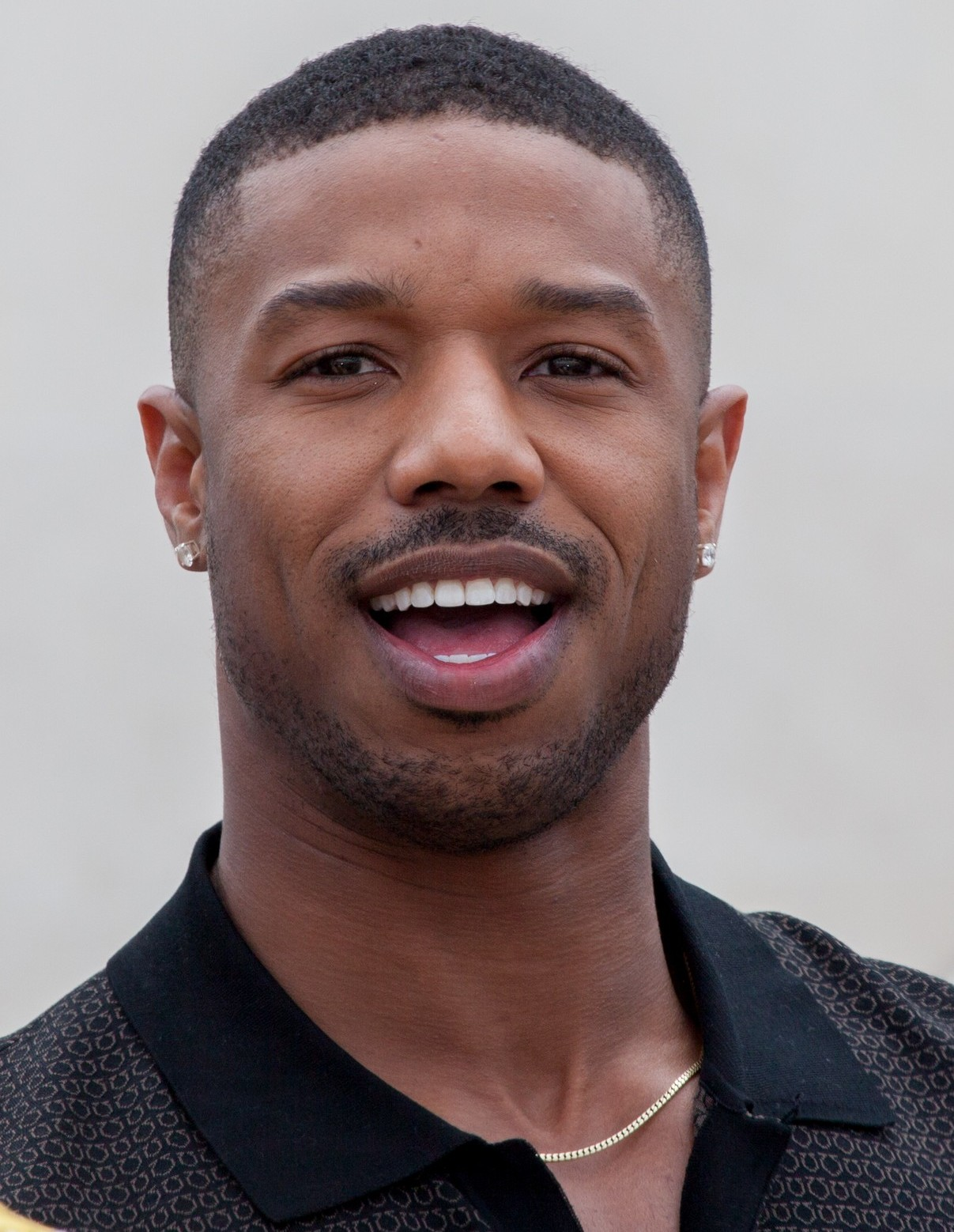
Michael B. Jordan

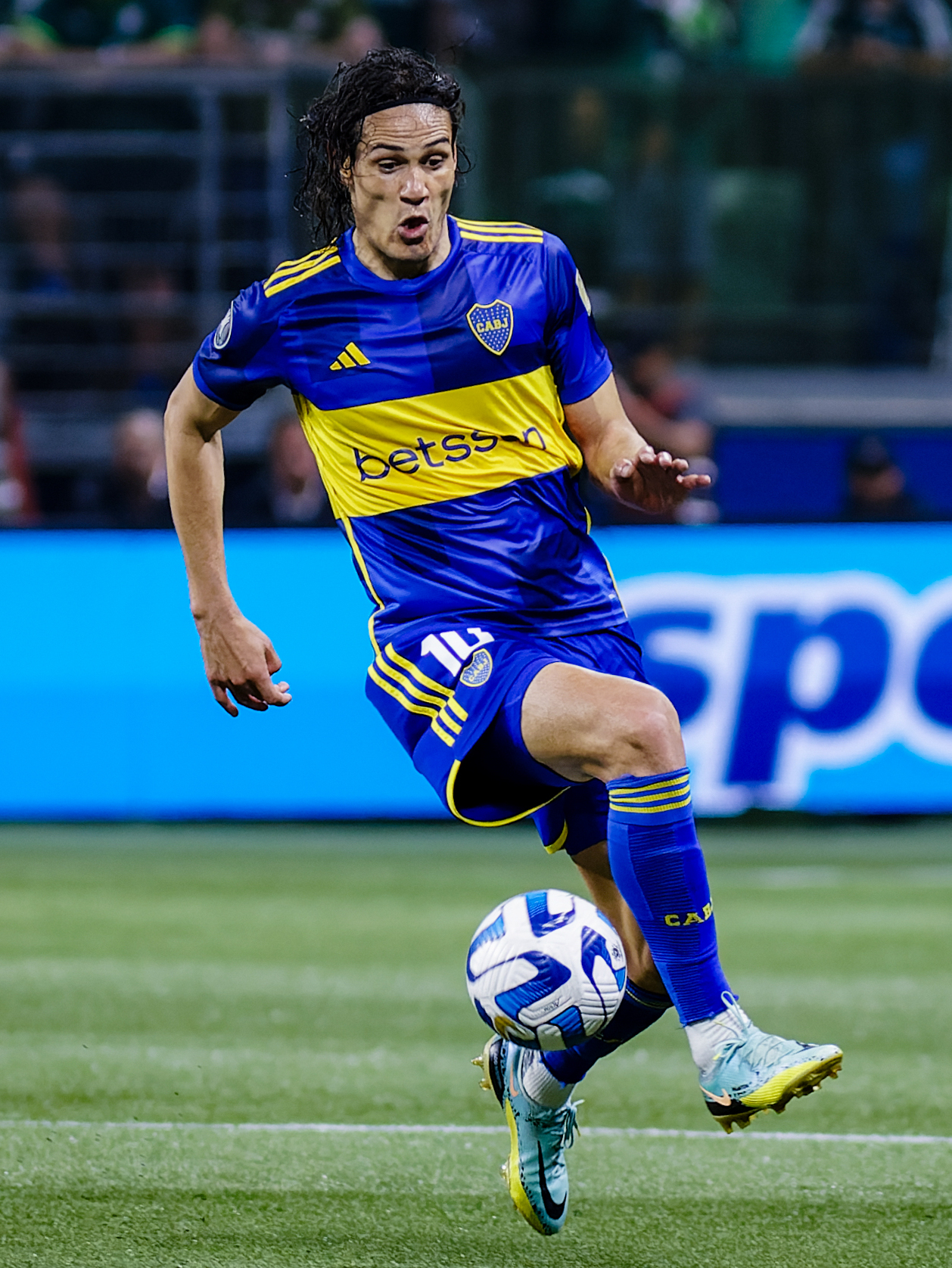
Edinson Cavani

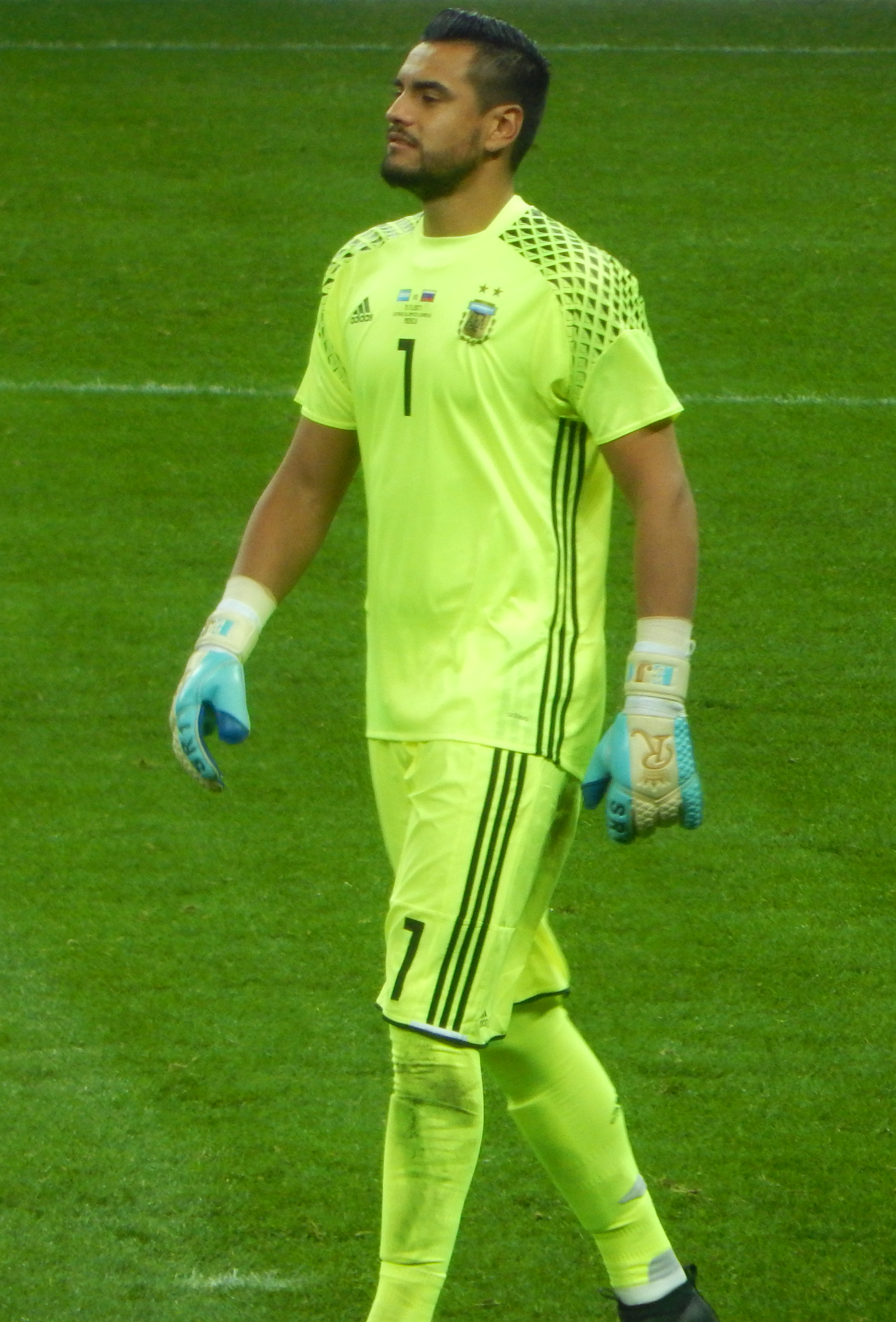
Sergio Romero

- February 1
  - Heather Morris, American actress and dancer
  - Giuseppe Rossi, Italian footballer
  - Ronda Rousey, American martial arts expert, actress and professional wrestler
- February 2
  - Faydee, Australian singer
  - Gerard Piqué, Spanish footballer
- February 4 – Lucie Šafářová, Czech tennis player
- February 5
  - Darren Criss, American singer and actor
  - Henry Golding, Malaysian-English actor, model, and television host
  - Özge Gürel, Turkish actress
- February 7 – Joel Freeland, British basketball player
- February 8 – Carolina Kostner, Italian figure skater
- February 9
  - Michael B. Jordan, American actor and producer
  - Rose Leslie, Scottish actress
  - Magdalena Neuner, German biathlete
- February 10
  - Choi Siwon, South Korean recording artist
  - Poli Genova, Bulgarian singer, songwriter, actress, and television presenter
  - Yuja Wang, Chinese pianist
- February 11
  - José Callejón, Spanish footballer
  - Ellen van Dijk, Dutch road and track cycling world champion
- February 13 – Eljero Elia, Dutch footballer
- February 14
  - Edinson Cavani, Uruguayan footballer
  - Yulia Savicheva, Russian singer
  - José Miguel Cubero, Costa Rican footballer
  - Tom Pyatt, Canadian ice hockey player
  - Fabian Schönheim, German professional footballer
  - David Wheater, English footballer
  - Candice Wiggins, American basketball player
- February 16
  - Luc Bourdon, Canadian ice hockey defenceman (d. 2008)
  - Mauricio Henao, Colombian actor
  - Jon Ossoff, American politician, senior senator from Georgia
- February 17
  - Raffi Ahmad, Indonesian actor and comedian
  - Ísis Valverde, Brazilian actress
- February 18 – Carla Hernández, Mexican actress
- February 20 – Miles Teller, American actor
- February 21
  - Ashley Greene, American actress
  - Elliot Page, Canadian actor
- February 22
  - Han Hyo-joo, South Korean actress
  - Sergio Romero, Argentine footballer
- February 24 – Tina Desai, Indian actress and model
- February 25 – Andrew Poje, Canadian figure skater
- February 26 – Johan Sjöstrand, Swedish handball player
- February 27 – Valeriy Andriytsev, Ukrainian wrestler

=== March ===
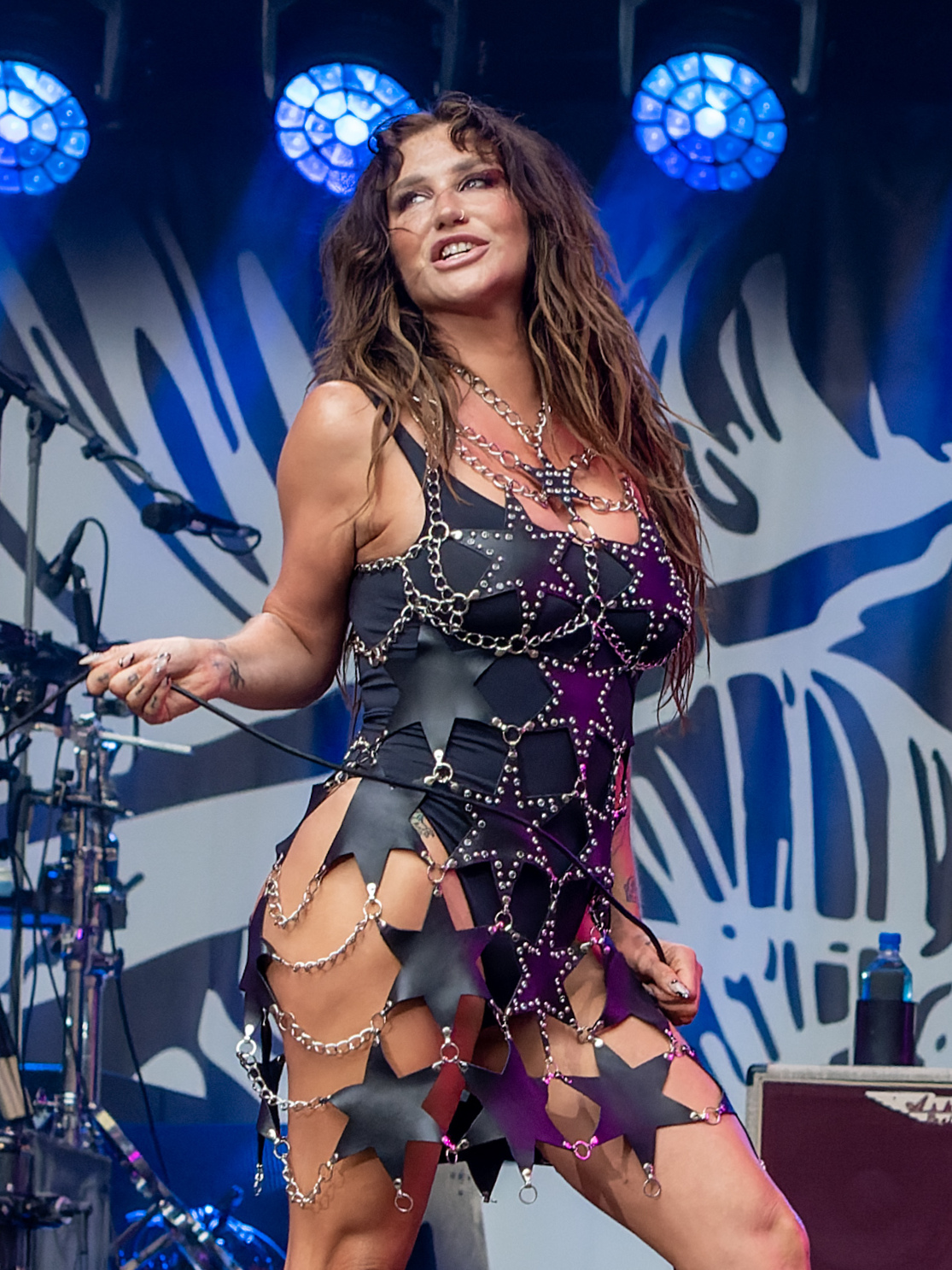
Kesha

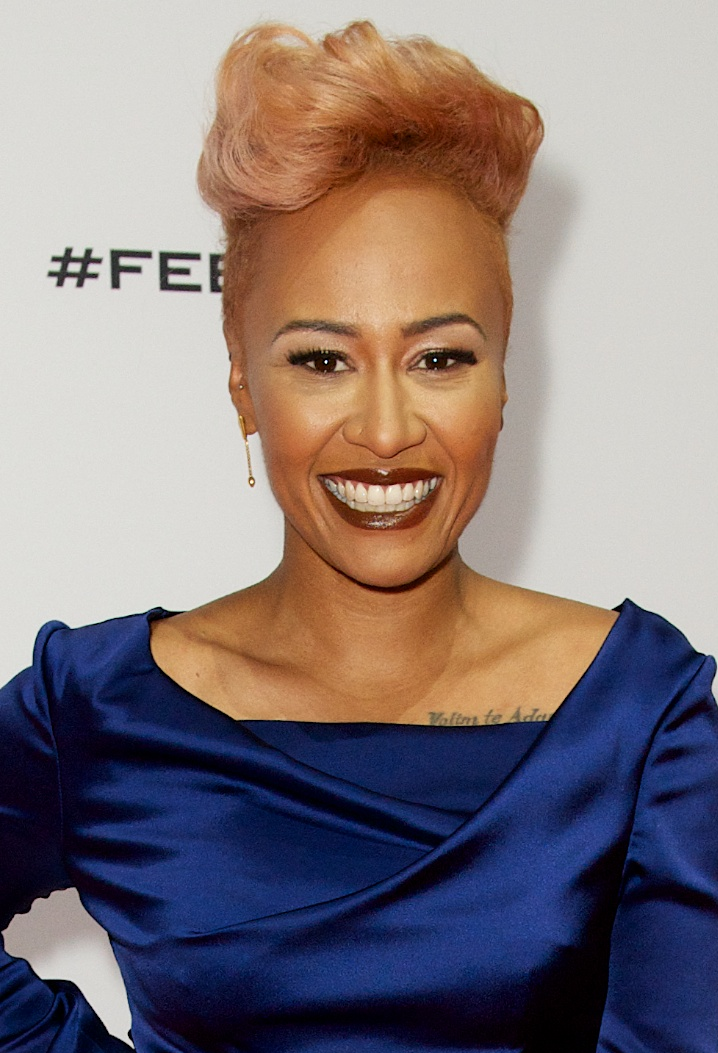
Emeli Sandé

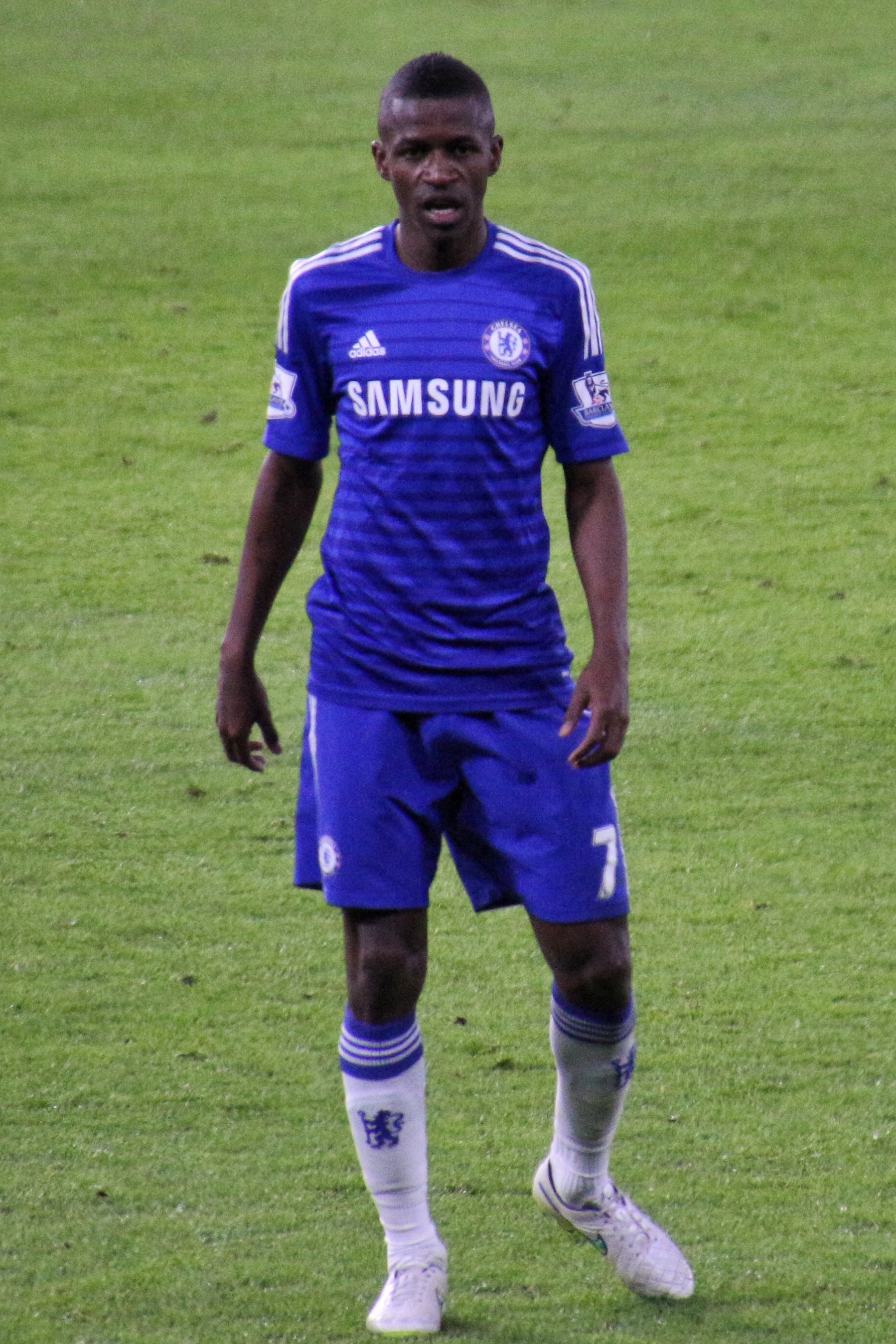
Ramires

- March 1 – Kesha, American singer
- March 2 – Solomon Okoronkwo, Nigerian footballer
- March 3 – Elnur Hüseynov, Azerbaijani singer
- March 5 – Anna Chakvetadze, Russian professional tennis player
- March 6
  - Kevin-Prince Boateng, Ghanaian-German footballer
  - Alexey Mochanov, Russian free diver
  - Hannah Taylor-Gordon, English actress, Emmy winner
- March 8
  - Milana Vayntrub, Uzbek-born American actress
  - Tobe Nwigwe, American rapper and actor
- March 9 – Bow Wow, American rapper and actor
- March 10
  - Liu Shishi, Chinese actress
  - Tuukka Rask, Finnish ice hockey player
  - Emeli Sandé, Scottish recording artist and songwriter
  - Igor Levit, Russian-German pianist
- March 11
  - Estefanía Villarreal, Mexican actress
  - Ngonidzashe Makusha, Zimbabwean sprinter and long jumper
- March 12
  - Maxwell Holt, American volleyball player
  - Teimour Radjabov, Azerbaijani chess player
  - Chris Seitz, American soccer player
  - Kim Seon-tae, South Korean YouTuber
- March 13
  - Mauro Zárate, Argentine footballer
  - Marco Andretti, American racing driver
- March 14
  - Aravane Rezaï, Iranian-French tennis player
  - Robert Clark, American-born Canadian actor, real estate investor
- March 16 – Alexandr Smyshlyaev, Russian freestyle skier
- March 17
  - Federico Fazio, Argentine footballer
  - Rob Kardashian, American television personality
- March 18
  - Gabriel Mercado, Argentine footballer
  - Cesare Rickler, Italian footballer, rally driver
  - Mauro Zárate, Argentine footballer
- March 19
  - AJ Lee, American professional wrestler
  - Josie Loren, American actress
- March 20 – Jô, Brazilian footballer
- March 21 – Yuri Ryazanov, Russian artistic gymnast (d. 2009)
- March 22 – Alexander Shatilov, Israeli artistic gymnast
- March 23 – Alan Toovey, Australian rules footballer
- March 24
  - Juan Diego Covarrubias, Mexican actor
  - Ramires, Brazilian footballer
- March 25
  - Victor Obinna, Nigerian footballer
  - Nobunari Oda, Japanese figure skater
- March 26 – Larisa Korobeynikova, Russian fencer
- March 27
  - Polina Gagarina, Russian singer, songwriter, actress, and model
  - Benjamin Savšek, Slovenian canoeist
- March 29 – Dénes Varga, Hungarian water polo player
- March 31 – Humpy Koneru, Indian chess grandmaster

=== April ===
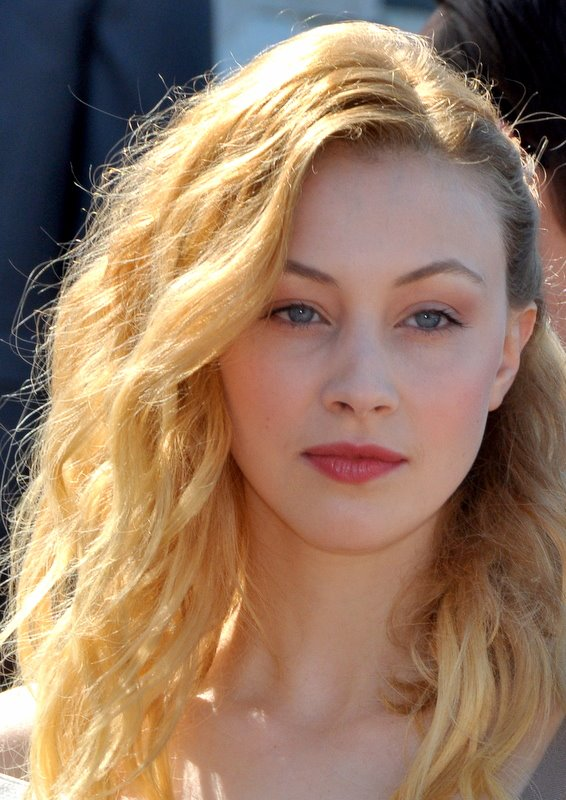
Sarah Gadon

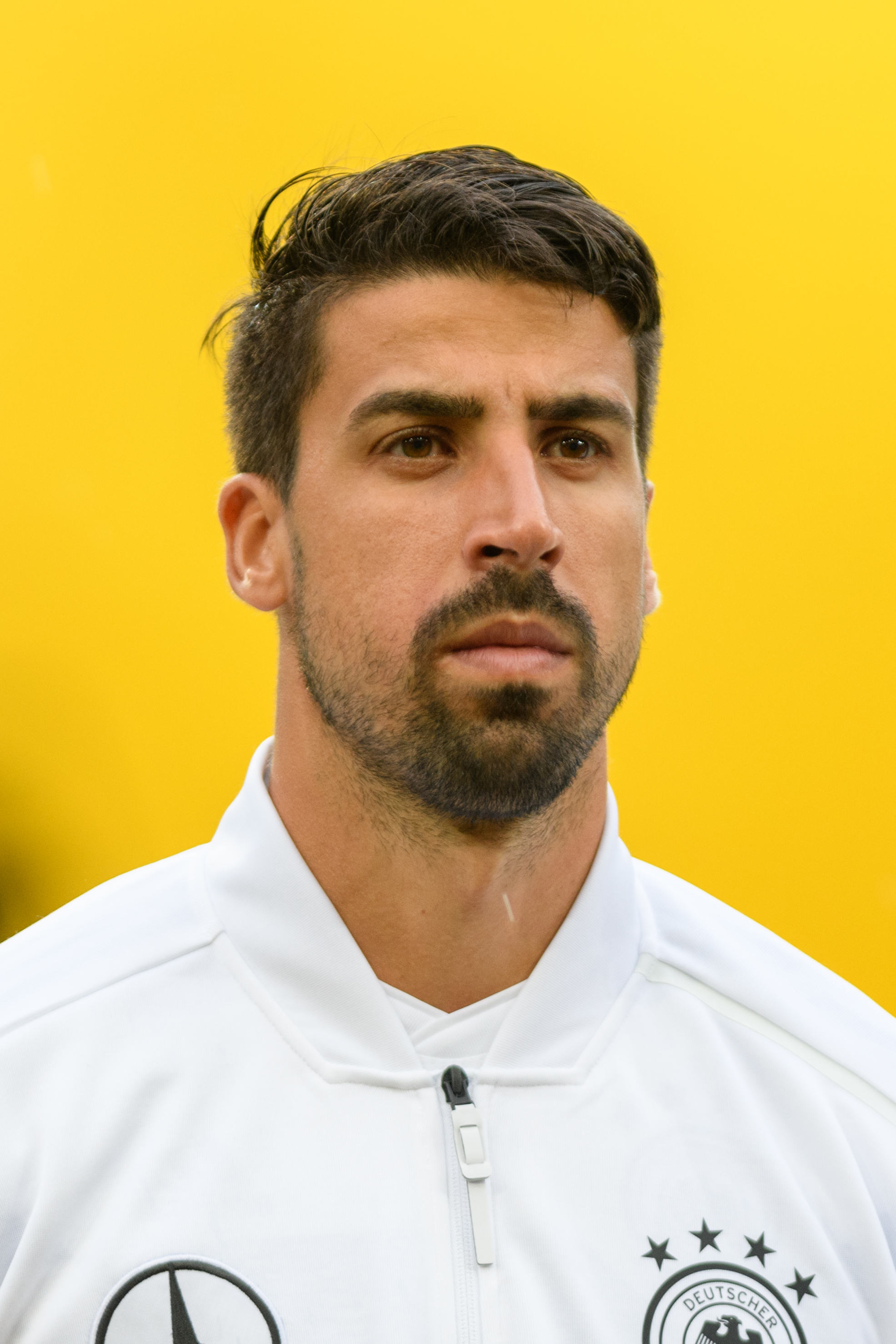
Sami Khedira

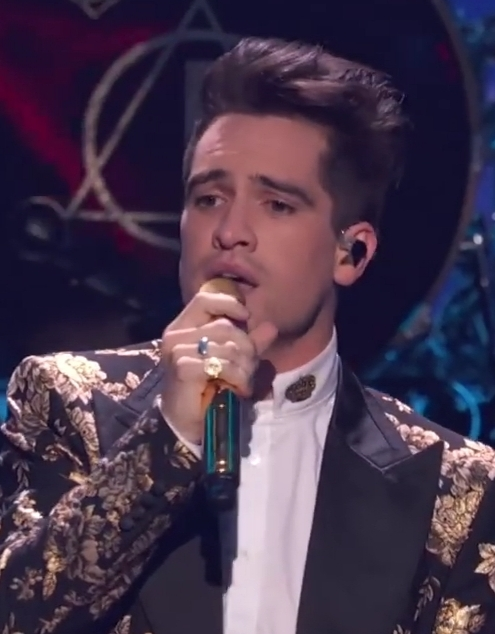
Brendon Urie

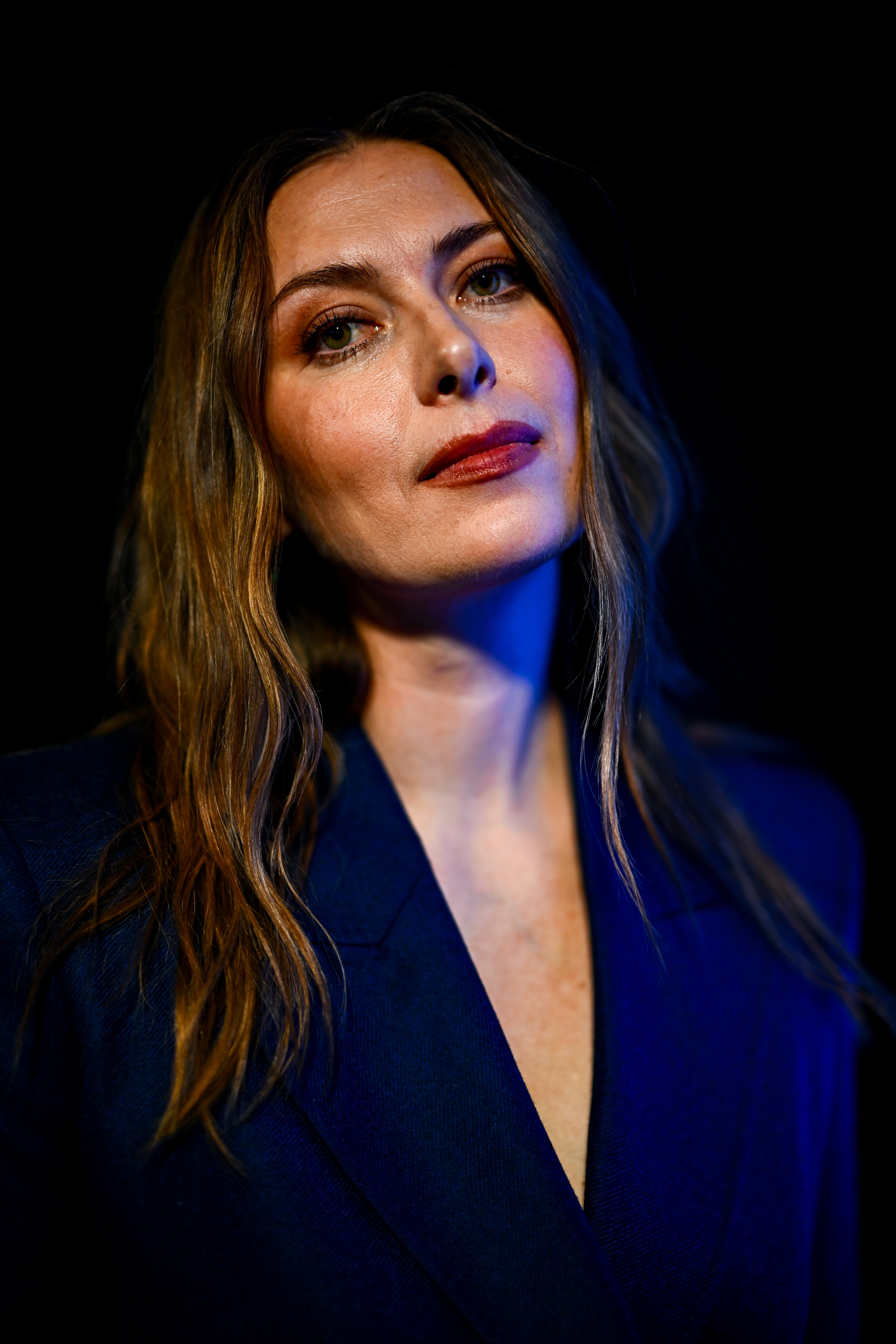
Maria Sharapova

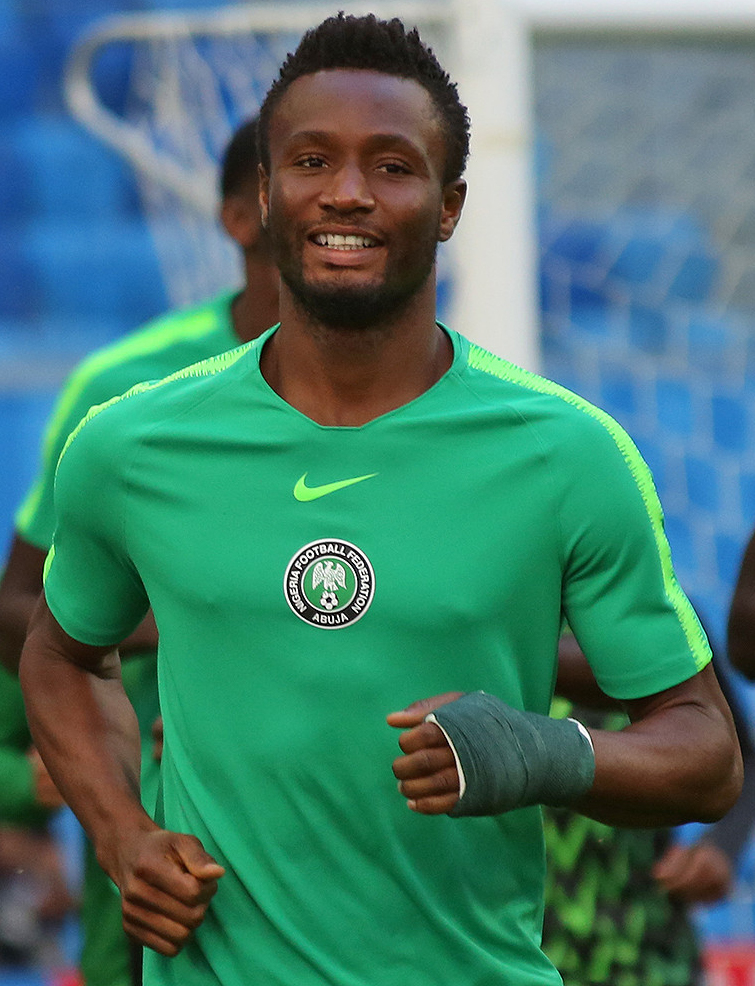
Mikel John Obi

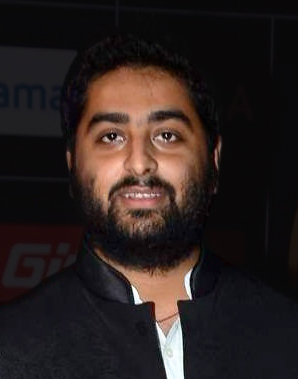
Arijit Singh

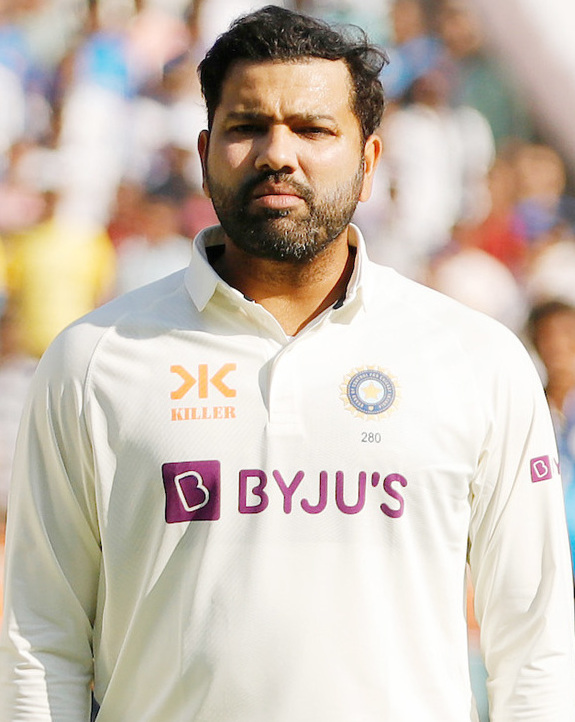
Rohit Sharma

- April 1
  - Mackenzie Davis, Canadian actress
  - Ding Junhui, Chinese snooker player
- April 4
  - Sarah Gadon, Canadian actress
  - Sami Khedira, German footballer
  - Océane Zhu, Chinese actress
- April 7 – Martín Cáceres, Uruguayan footballer
- April 8 – Royston Drenthe, Dutch footballer
- April 9
  - Sarah, Crown Princess of Brunei, wife of the Crown Prince of Brunei, Al-Muhtadee Billah
  - Paddy Barnes, Irish boxer
  - Blaise Matuidi, French footballer
  - Sara Petersen, Danish hurdler
- April 10
  - Hayley Westenra, New Zealand soprano
  - Shay Mitchell, Canadian actress and model
- April 11
  - Joss Stone, English singer and actress
  - Lights Poxleitner, Canadian musician
- April 12
  - Luiz Adriano, Brazilian footballer
  - Brooklyn Decker, American fashion model and actress
  - Brendon Urie, American musician
- April 15 – Samira Wiley, American actress and model
- April 16 – Aaron Lennon, English footballer
- April 17
  - Medhi Benatia, French born-Moroccan footballer
  - Jacqueline MacInnes Wood, Canadian actress
- April 18 – Rosie Huntington-Whiteley, English supermodel
- April 19
  - Joe Hart, English footballer
  - Maria Sharapova, Russian tennis player
  - Oksana Akinshina, Russian actress
- April 21
  - Anastasia Prikhodko, Ukrainian folk rock and traditional pop singer
  - Pepe Herrera, Filipino actor and comedian
- April 22
  - David Luiz, Brazilian footballer
  - Mikel John Obi, Nigerian footballer
- April 24
  - Varun Dhawan, Indian actor
  - Serdar Tasci, German footballer
  - Jan Vertonghen, Belgian footballer
- April 25 − Arijit Singh, Indian playback singer
- April 26 − Jarmila Wolfe, Slovak born-Australian tennis player
- April 27
  - Anne Suzuki, Japanese actress
  - Emma Taylor-Isherwood, Canadian actress
  - William Moseley, English actor
- April 28
  - Samantha Ruth Prabhu, Indian film actress and model
  - Daequan Cook, American basketball player
  - Zoran Tošić, Serbian footballer
- April 29 – Sara Errani, Italian tennis player
- April 30 – Rohit Sharma, Indian cricketer

=== May ===
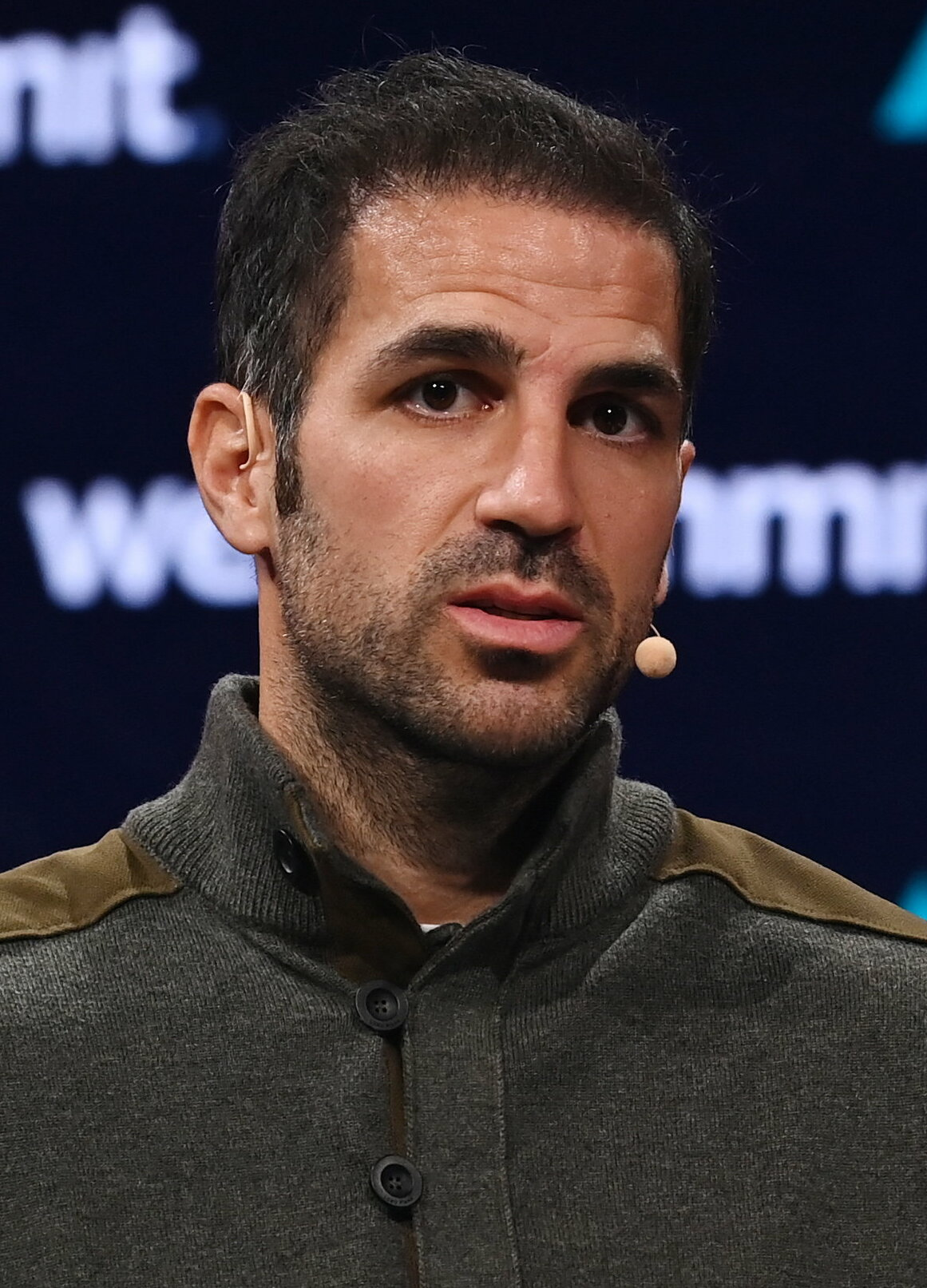
Cesc Fàbregas

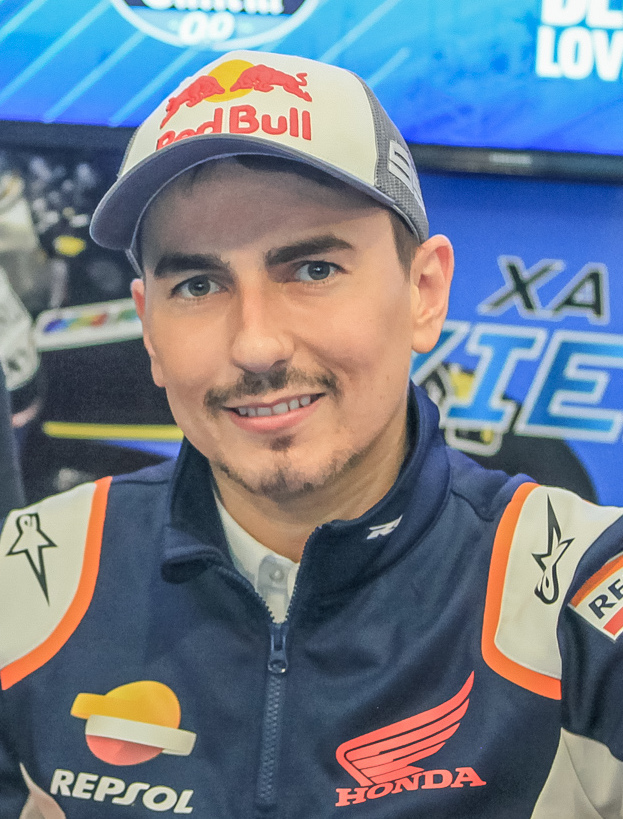
Jorge Lorenzo

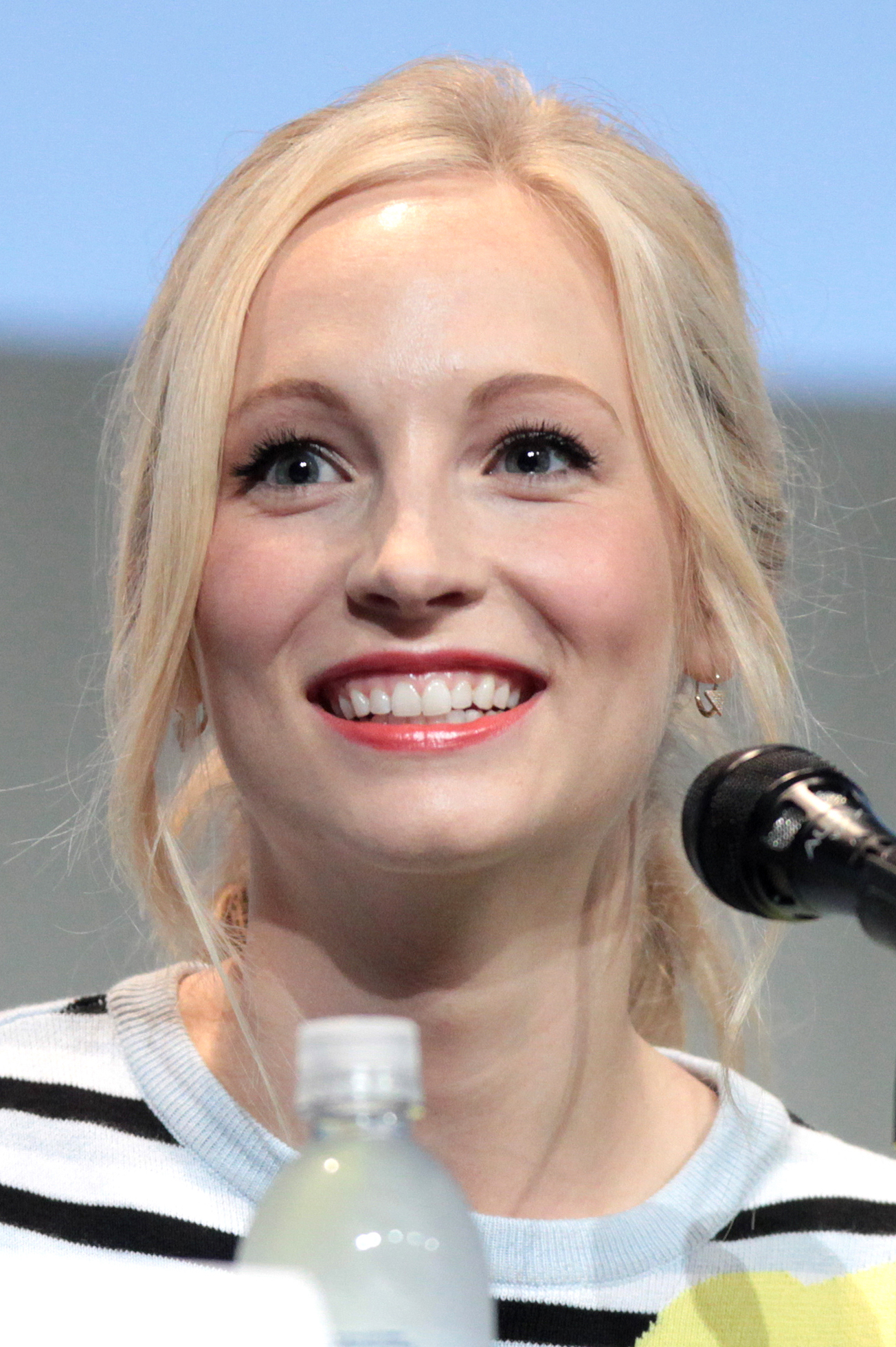
Candice King

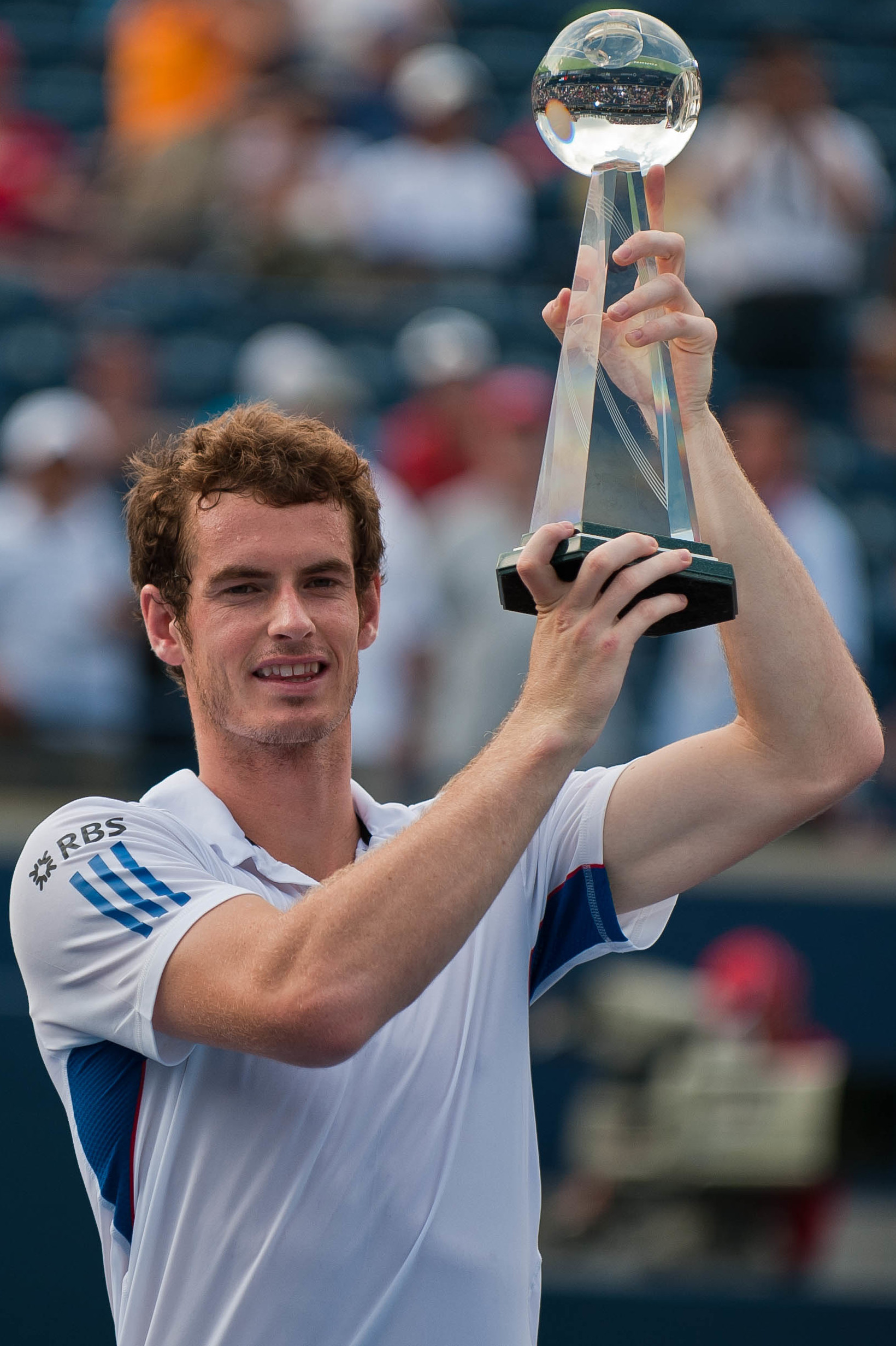
Andy Murray

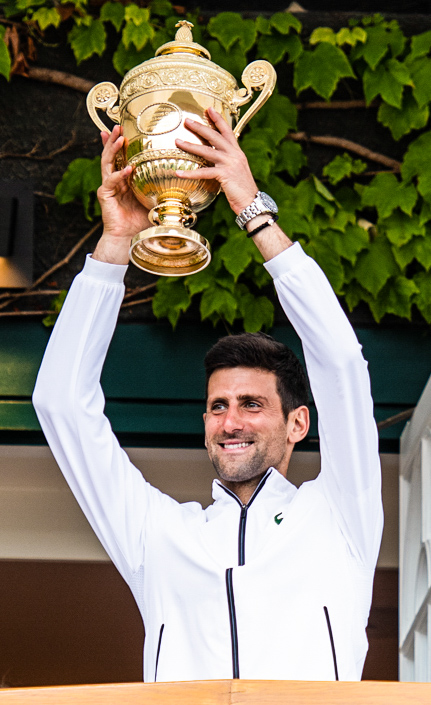
Novak Djokovic

- May 1
  - Leonardo Bonucci, Italian footballer
  - Matt Di Angelo, British Actor
  - Shahar Pe'er, Israeli tennis player
- May 2 – Nana Kitade, Japanese singer
- May 3 – Damla Sönmez, Turkish actress
- May 4
  - Cesc Fàbregas, Spanish football player
  - Jorge Lorenzo, Spanish triple MotoGP world champion
  - Zbigniew Bartman, Polish volleyball player
- May 6
  - Dries Mertens, Belgian footballer
  - Moon Geun-young, Korean actress
- May 11
  - Albulena Haxhiu, Kosovo Albanian politician
  - Enikő Mihalik, Hungarian model
  - Kamaru Usman, Nigerian born-American mixed martial artist
- May 12
  - Robbie Rogers, American soccer player
  - Lance Lynn, American baseball player
  - Kieron Pollard, Trinidadian cricketer
  - Darren Randolph, Irish footballer
  - Lee Wai-sze, Hong Kong cyclist
  - Liu Hong, Chinese racewalker
- May 13
  - Antonio Adán, Spanish footballer
  - Hunter Parrish, American actor and singer
  - Candice King, American actress and singer
  - Marianne Vos, Dutch multiple cyclist
- May 15
  - Thaísa Menezes, Brazilian volleyball player
  - Andy Murray, Scottish tennis player
- May 17 – Ott Lepland, Estonian singer
- May 18 – Luisana Lopilato, Argentine actress and singer
- May 20
  - Julian Wright, American basketball player
  - Syazwan Zulkifly, Malaysian actor, born in South Korea
- May 22
  - Arturo Vidal, Chilean footballer
  - Novak Djokovic, Serbian tennis player
- May 24 – Fabio Fognini, Italian tennis player
- May 25 – Kamil Stoch, Polish ski jumper
- May 26 – Tooji, Norwegian-Iranian singer, model and television host
- May 27
  - Gervinho, Ivorian footballer
  - Bella Heathcote, Australian actress
  - Martina Sáblíková, Czech speed skater
- May 29
  - Noah Reid, Canadian actor and musician
  - Daniela Ryf, Swiss triathlete
- May 31 – Shaun Fleming, American actor and musician

=== June ===
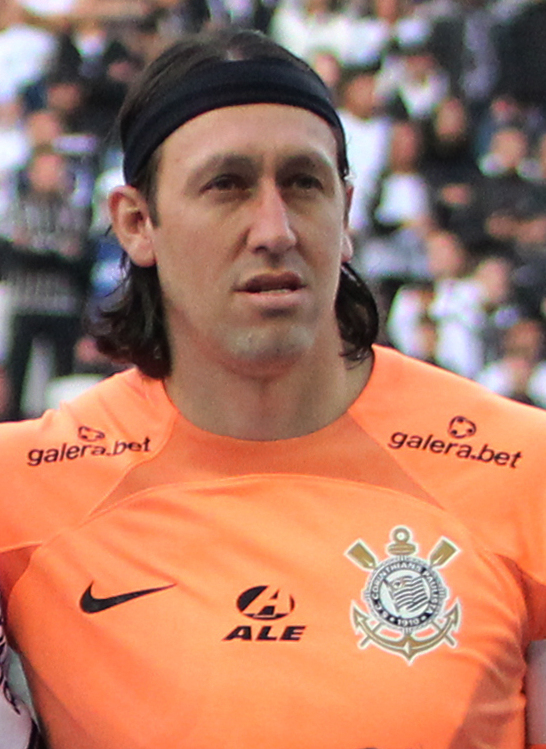
Cássio

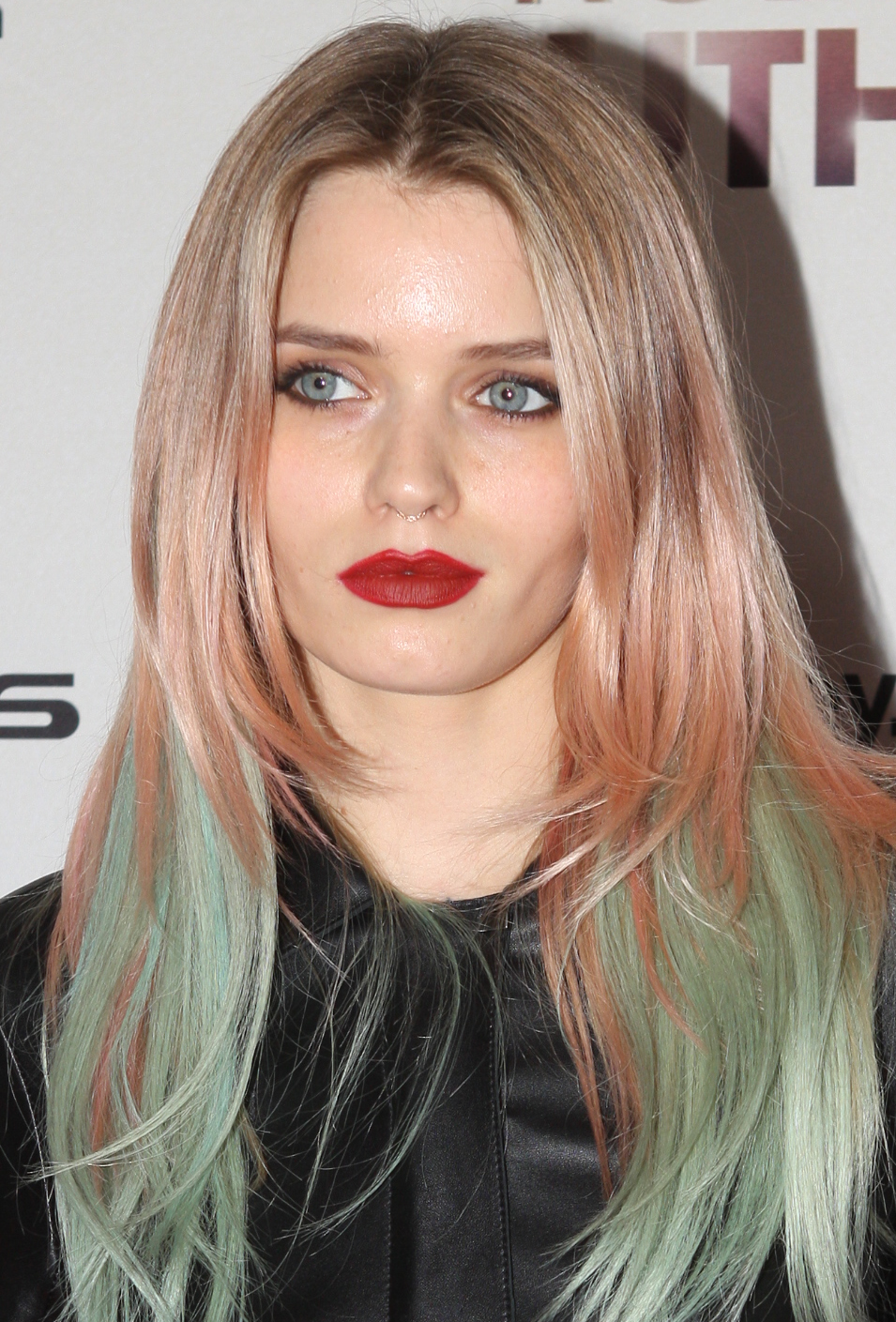
Abbey Lee

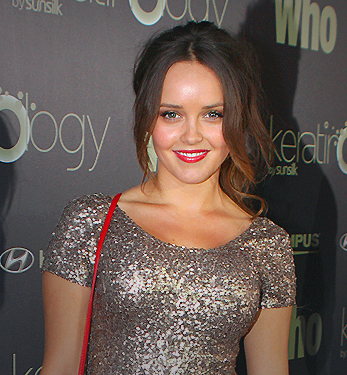
Rebecca Breeds

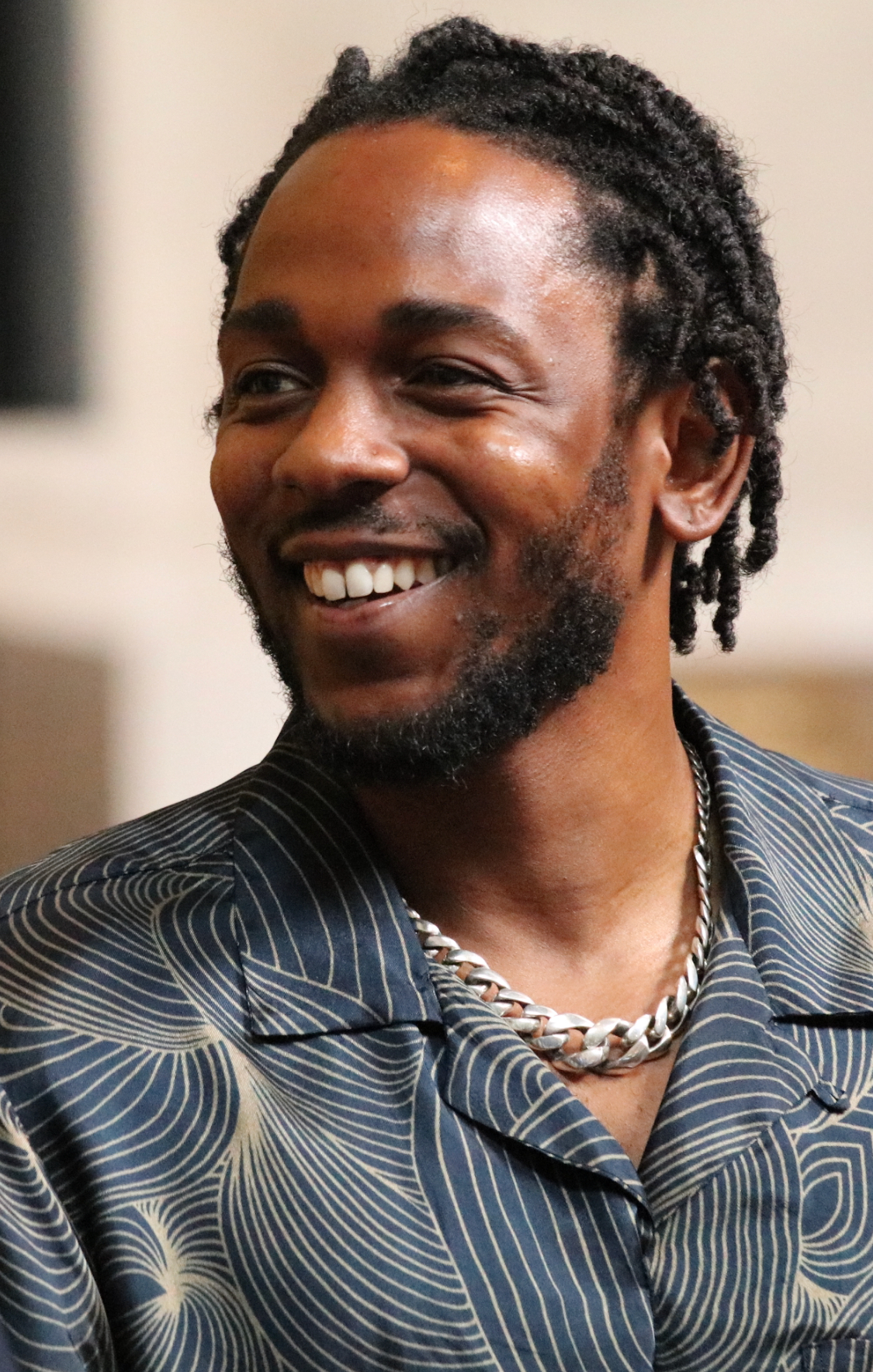
Kendrick Lamar

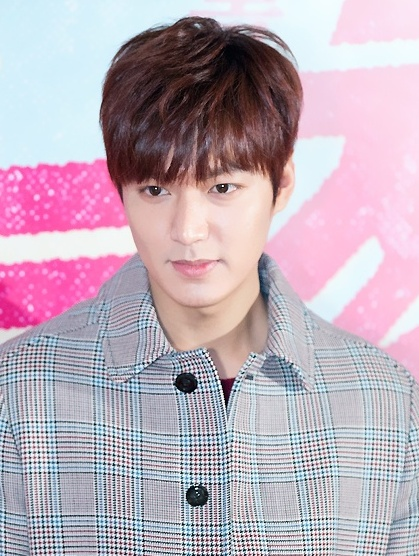
Lee Min-ho

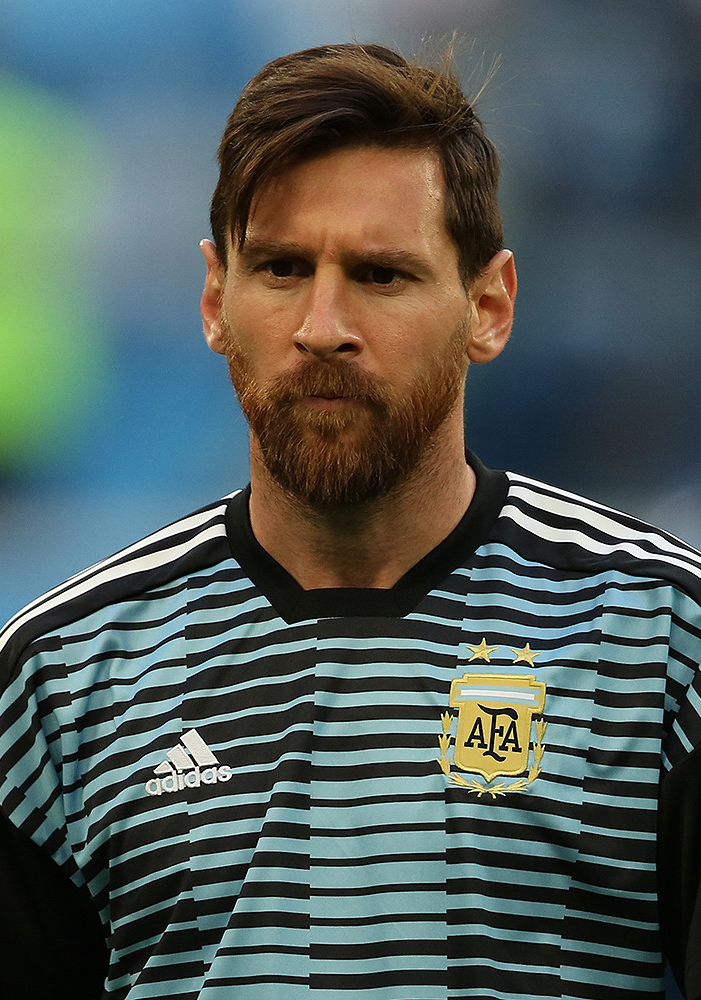
Lionel Messi

- June 1 – Yarisley Silva, Cuban pole vaulter
- June 2
  - Tobias Arlt, German Olympic luger
  - Clayton Bartolo, Maltese politician
  - Sonakshi Sinha, Indian actress
- June 3
  - Masami Nagasawa, Japanese actress
  - Lalaine, American actress, singer-songwriter, and bassist
- June 6 – Cássio, Brazilian footballer
- June 10 – He Chong, Chinese diver
- June 11
  - Robertlandy Simón, Cuban volleyball player
  - Didrik Solli-Tangen, Norwegian singer
- June 12
  - Abbey Lee, Australian model
  - Antonio Barragán, Spanish footballer
- June 16 – Tobias Wendl, German Olympic luger
- June 17
  - Rebecca Breeds, Australian actress
  - Kendrick Lamar, American rapper
- June 18
  - Ezgi Asaroğlu, Turkish actress
  - Niels Schneider, French-Canadian actor
  - Zsuzsanna Tomori, Hungarian handball player
- June 20
  - A-fu, Taiwanese singer and songwriter
  - Asmir Begović, Bosnian footballer
  - Daiana Menezes, Brazilian actress, model, and television host
- June 21
  - Khatia Buniatishvili, Georgian concert pianist
  - Kim Ryeo-wook, South Korean singer
  - Sebastian Prödl, Austrian footballer
- June 22
  - Joe Dempsie, English actor
  - Eda Erdem, Turkish volleyball player
  - Nikita Rukavytsya, Ukrainian born-Australian soccer player
  - Lee Min-ho, South Korean actor, singer and model
- June 23
  - Guillaume Bonnafond, French road bicycle racer
  - Nando de Colo, French basketball player
  - Aaron Groom, Fijian rugby league footballer
- June 24
  - Lionel Messi, Argentine footballer
  - Pierre Vaultier, French snowboarder
- June 25 – Sandrine Gruda, French basketball player
- June 26
  - Samir Nasri, French footballer
  - Wallace de Souza, Brazilian volleyball player

=== July ===
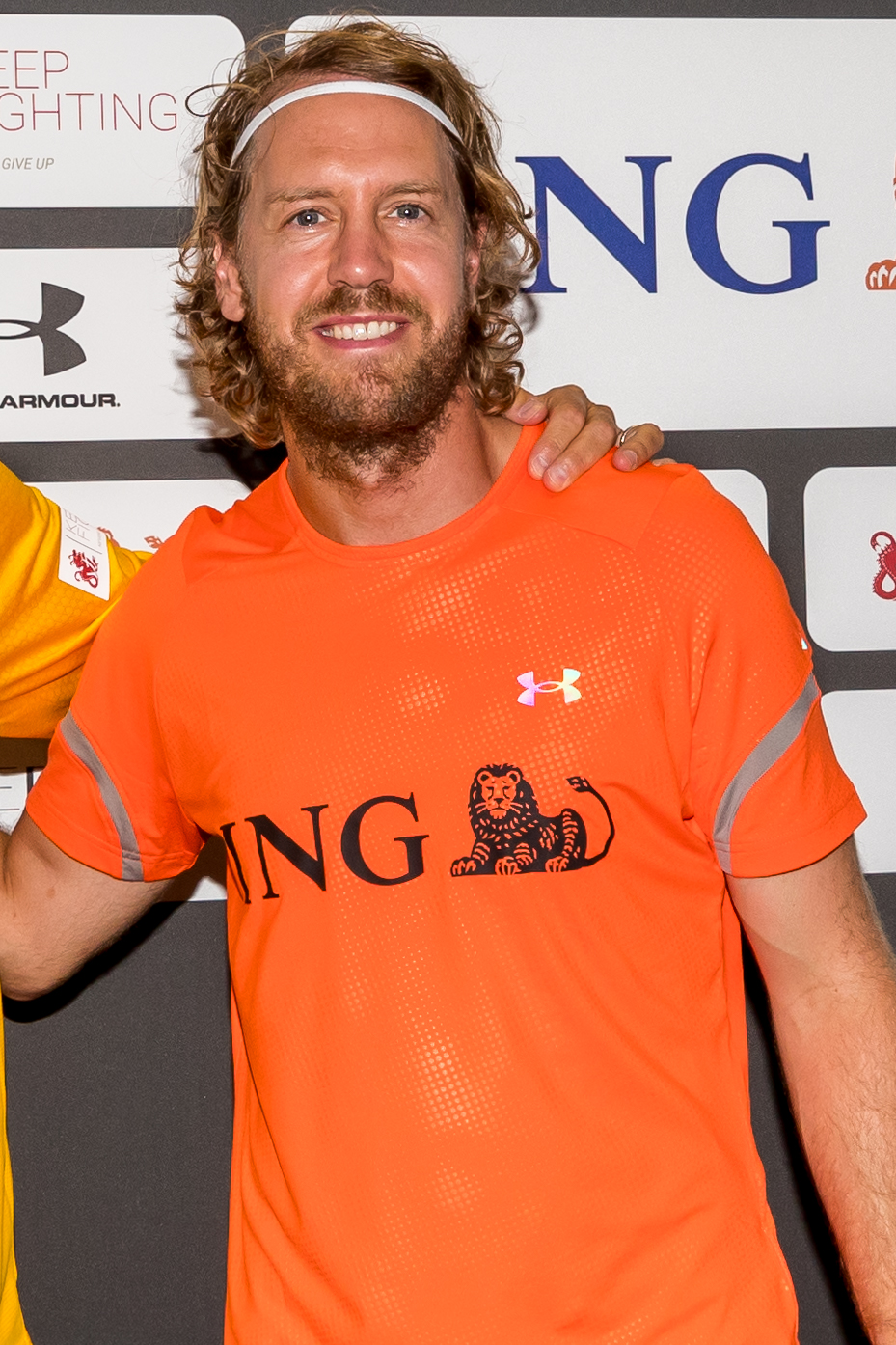
Sebastian Vettel

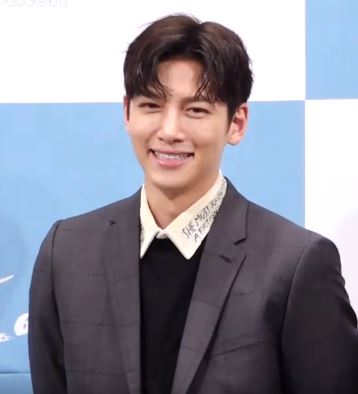
Ji Chang-wook

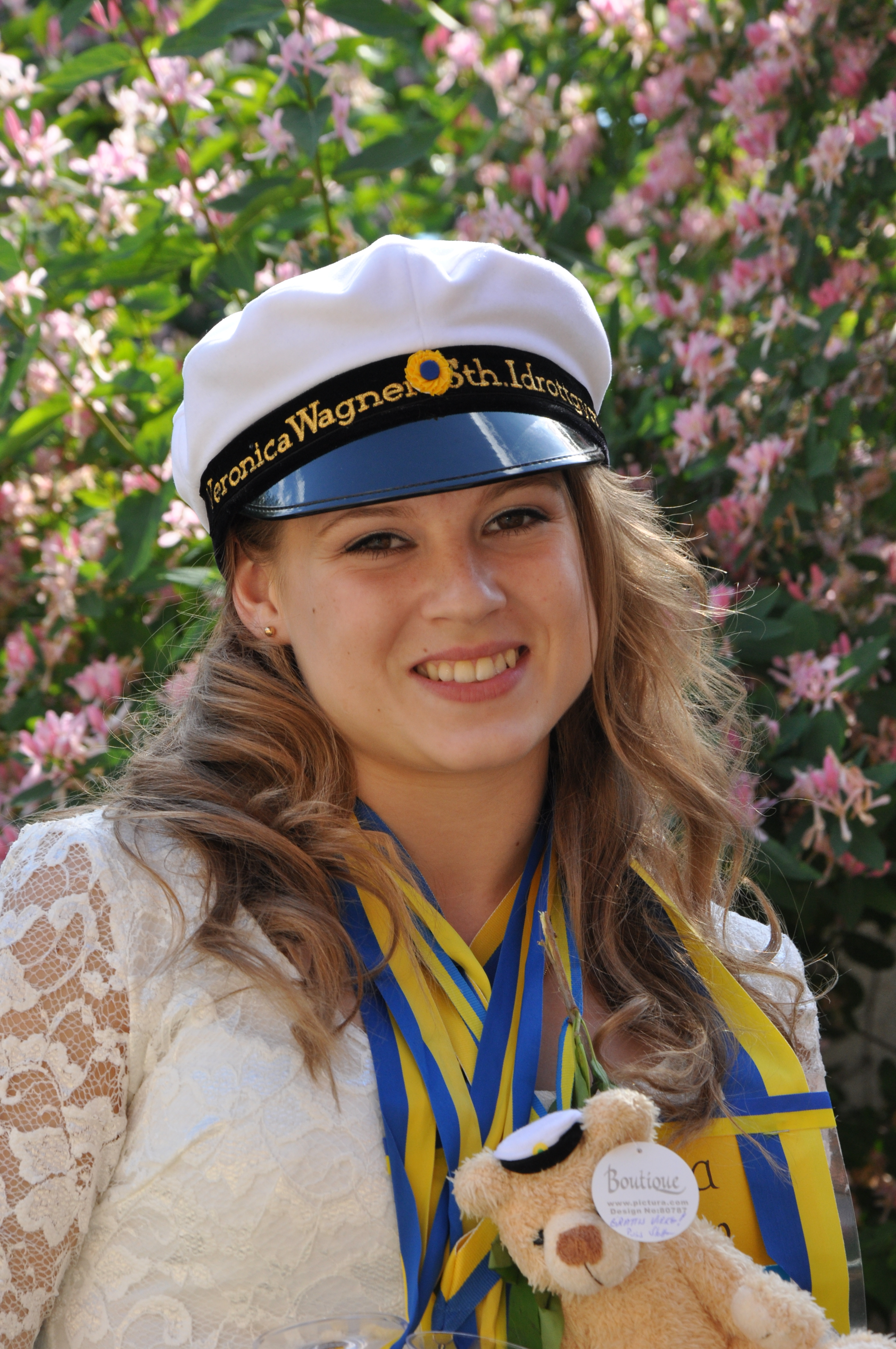
Veronica Wagner

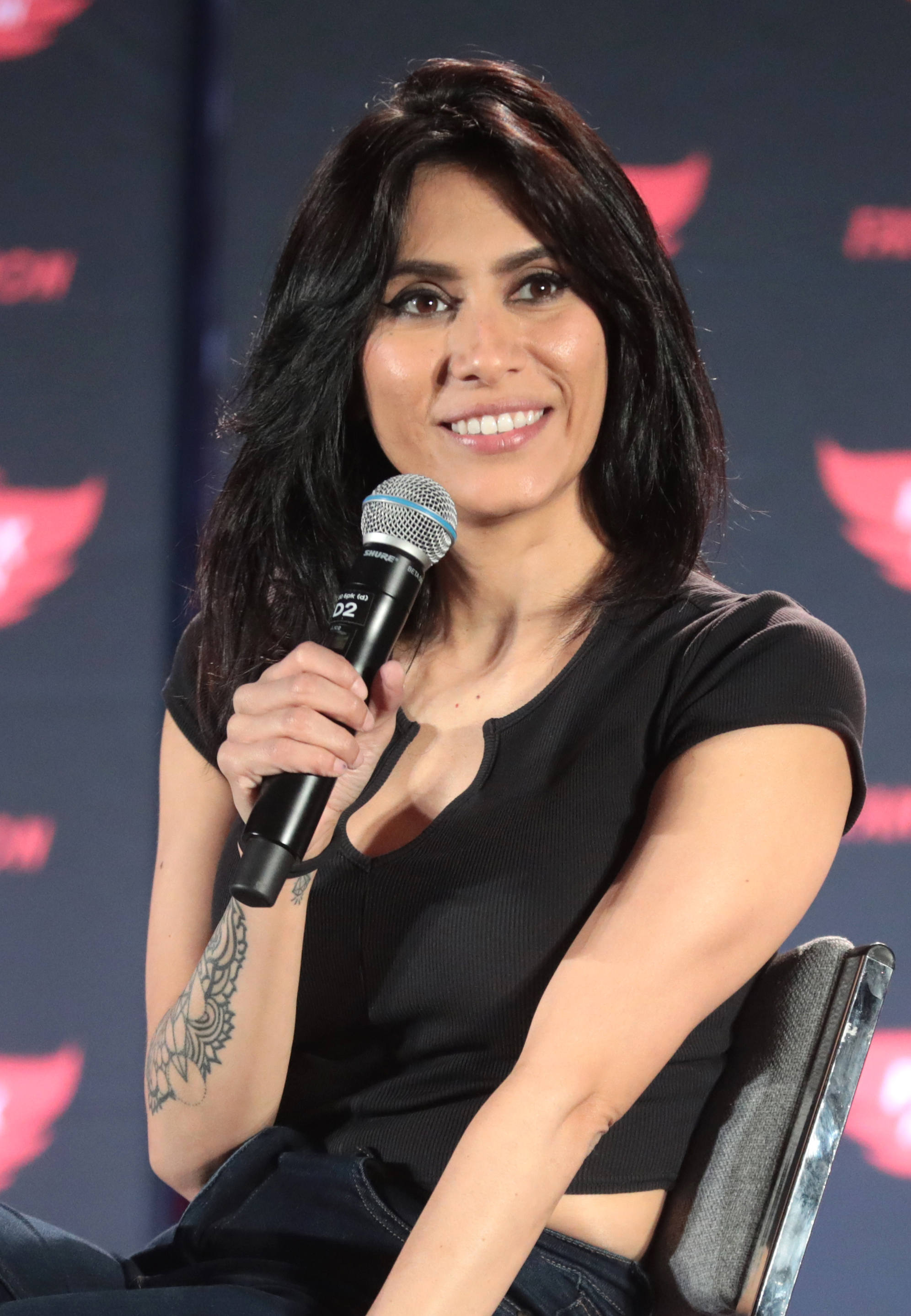
Cristina Vee

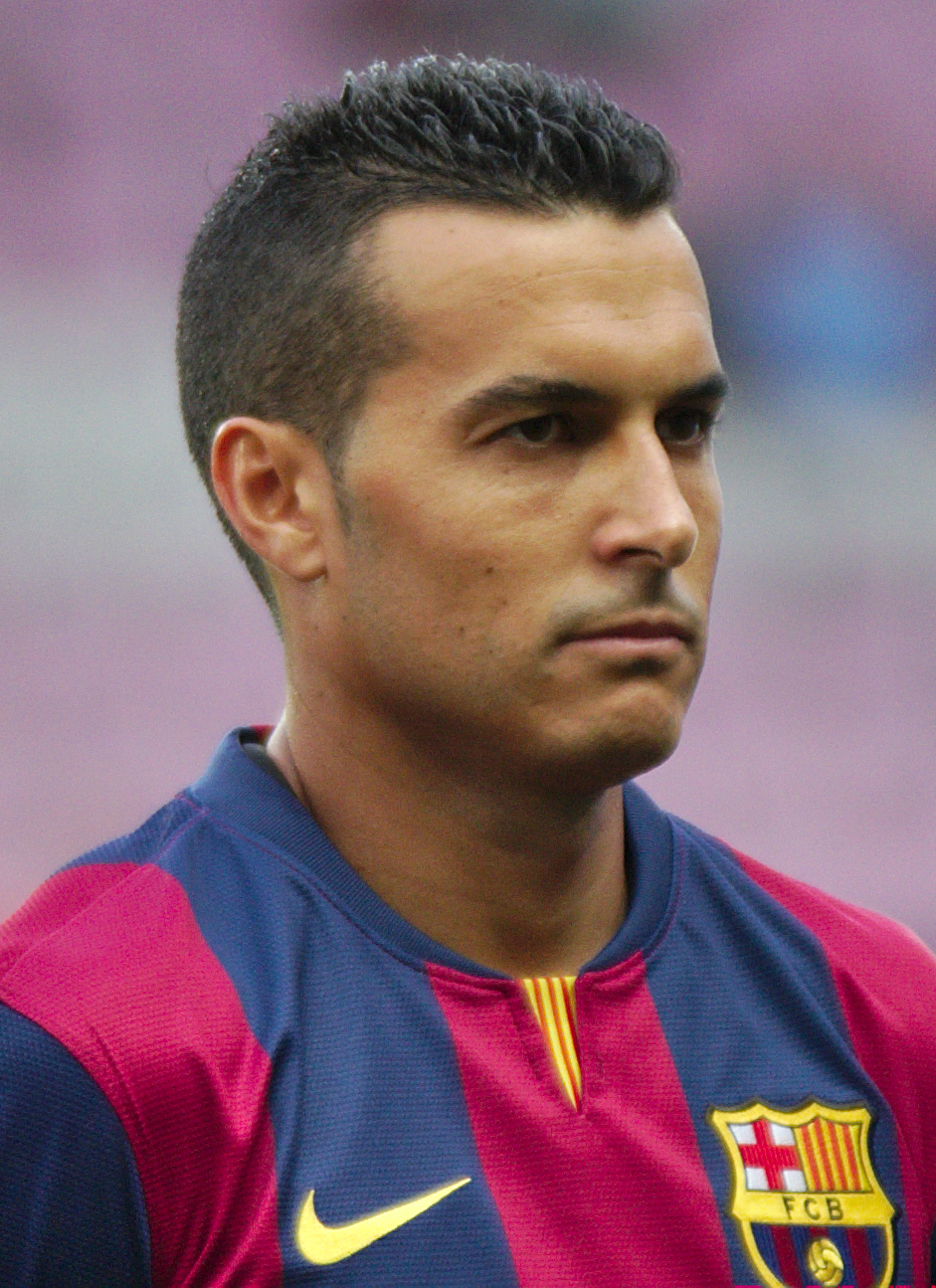
Pedro

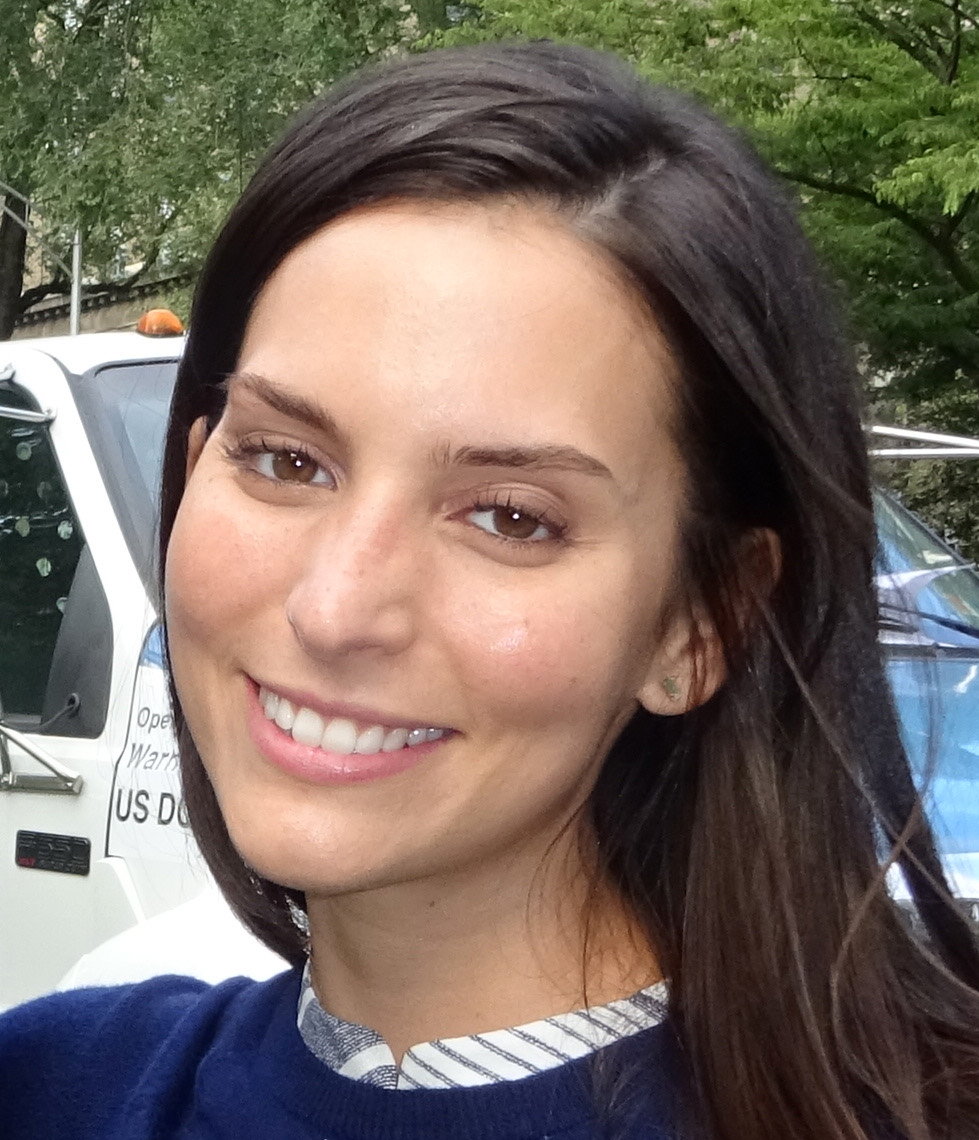
Genesis Rodriguez

- July 1 – Ahn Jae-hyun, South Korean model and actor
- July 2
  - Esteban Granero, Spanish footballer
  - Ruslana Korshunova, Kazakhstani model (d. 2008)
- July 3 – Sebastian Vettel, German racing driver, 4-time champions in Formula One
- July 5
  - David Halaifonua, Tongan rugby union player
  - Ji Chang-wook, South Korean actor
  - Chen Xiao, Chinese actor and model
- July 6
  - Kate Nash, British singer-songwriter
  - Caroline Trentini, Brazilian model
- July 9
  - Rebecca Sugar, American animator and creator of Steven Universe
  - Élodie Fontan, French actress
- July 11
  - Maximilian Müller, German field hockey player
  - Cristina Vee, American voice actress
- July 13
  - Eva Rivas, Armenian-Russian singer
  - Ajmal Kasab, Pakistani terrorist (d. 2012)
- July 14
  - Sara Canning, Canadian actress
  - Dan Reynolds, American singer and musician
- July 16 – AnnaLynne McCord, American actress
- July 18 – Tontowi Ahmad, Indonesian badminton player
- July 19
  - Yan Gomes, Brazilian baseball player
  - Ho Ho Lun, Hong Kong wrestler
- July 20 – Owen Cheung, Hong Kong actor
- July 22 – Andrey Golubev, Russian born-Kazakhstani tennis player
- July 23 – Julian Nagelsmann, German football coach
- July 24 – Mara Wilson, American actress and writer
- July 25 – Eran Zahavi, Israeli footballer
- July 27 – Marek Hamšík, Slovak footballer
- July 28
  - Anyer Antonio Blanco, Cuban dissident
  - Sumire, Japanese fashion model (d. 2009)
  - Pedro, Spanish footballer
- July 29 – Genesis Rodriguez, American actress and model
- July 31
  - Brittany Byrnes, Australian actress
  - Michael Bradley, American soccer player

=== August ===
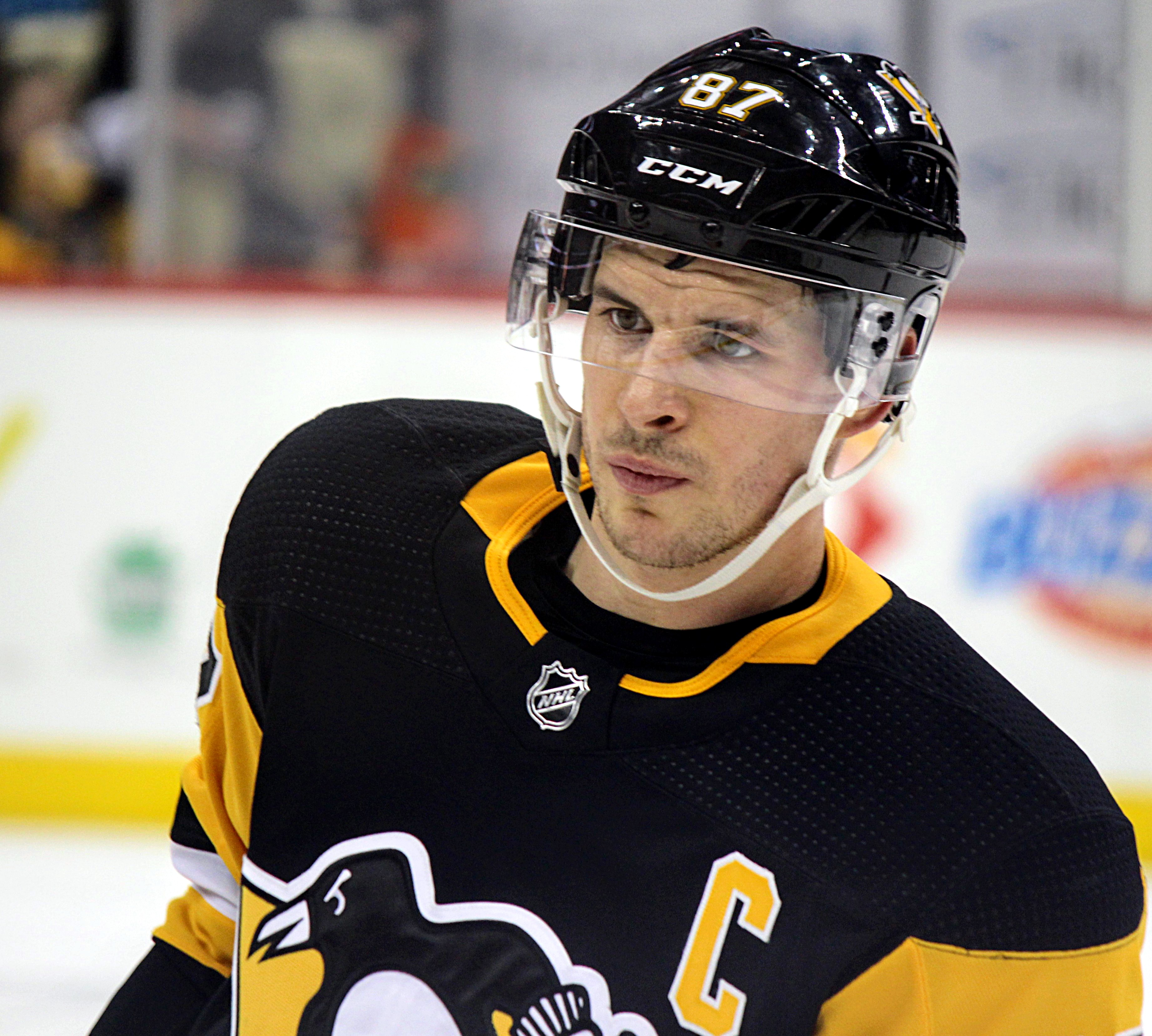
Sidney Crosby

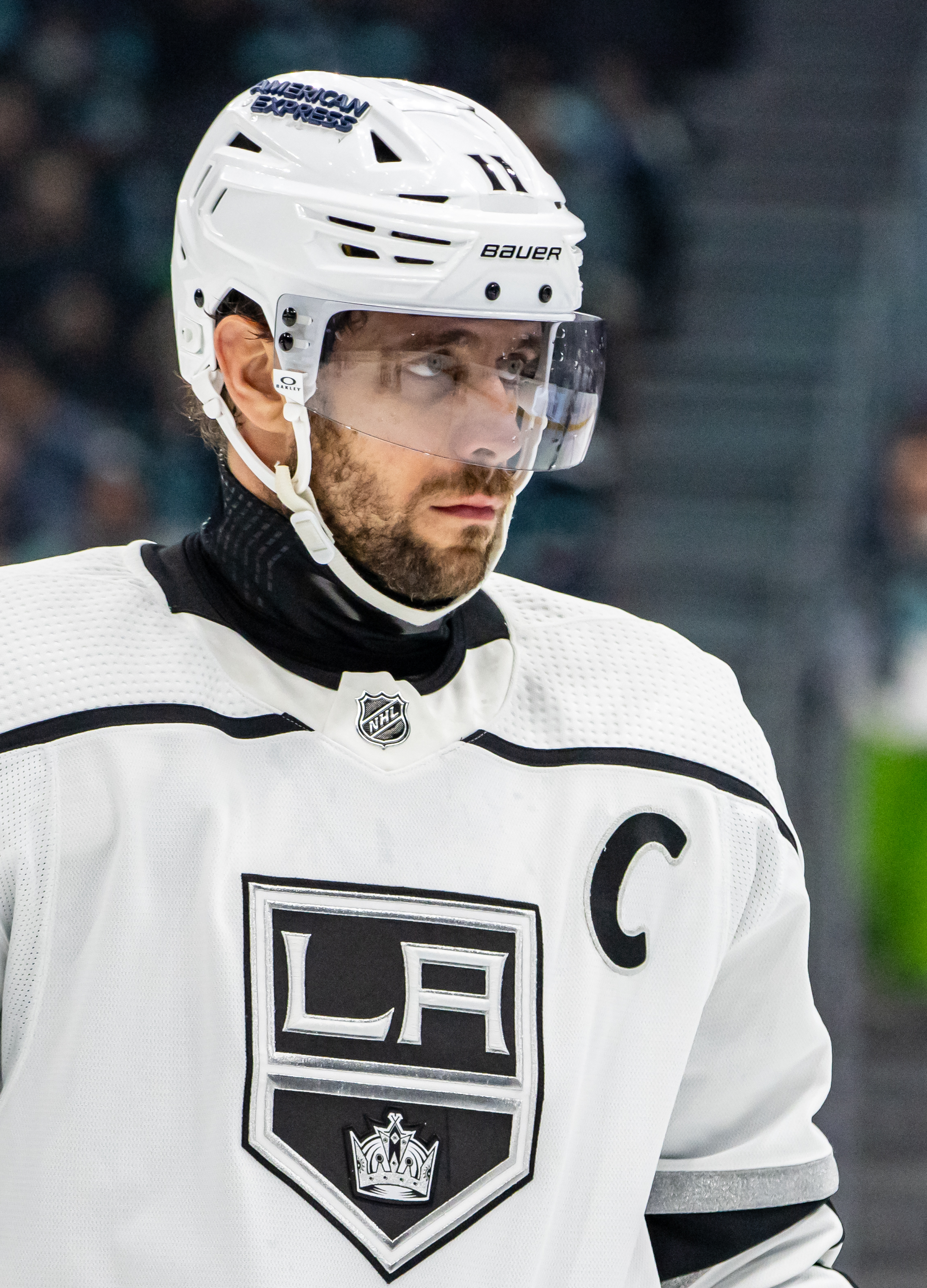
Anže Kopitar

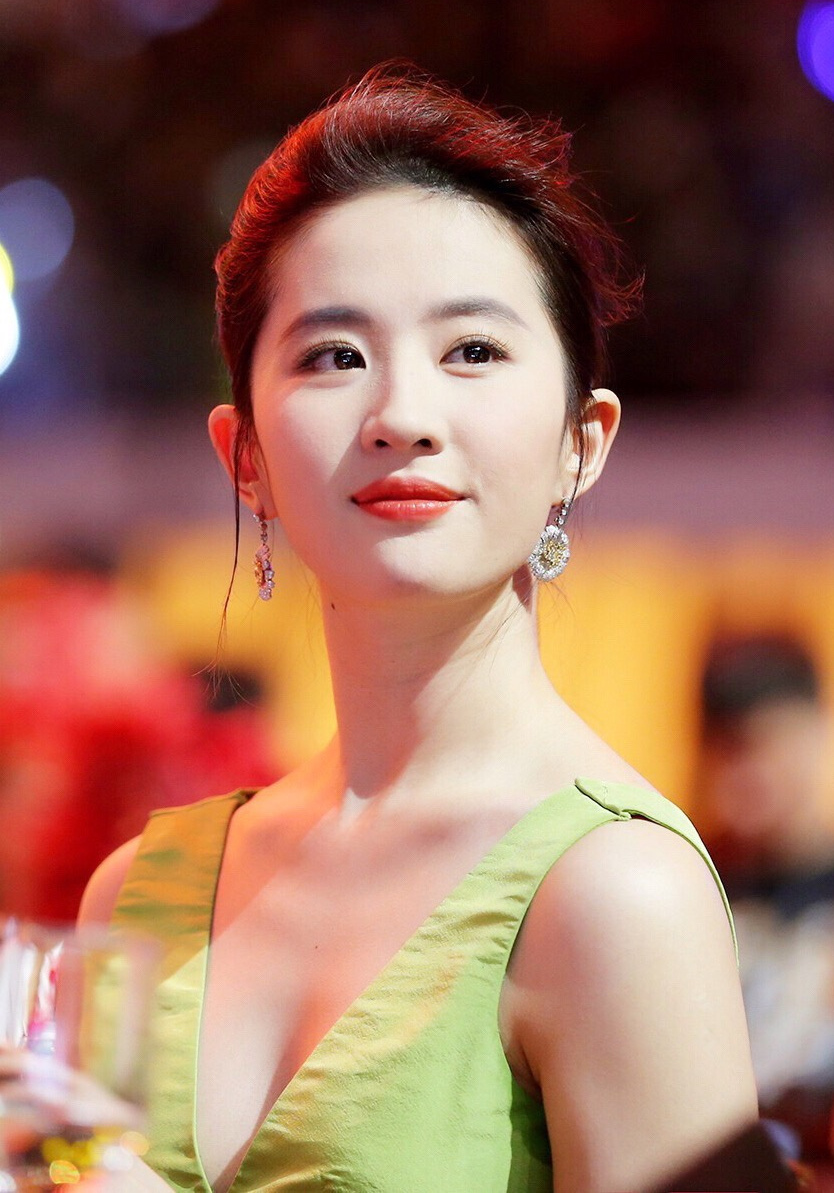
Liu Yifei

- August 1
  - Iago Aspas, Spanish footballer
  - Marta Walczykiewicz, Polish sprint canoeist
- August 4 – Phil Younghusband, British-Filipino footballer
- August 6 – Tosaint Ricketts, Canadian soccer player
- August 7 – Sidney Crosby, Canadian ice hockey player
- August 8 – Katie Leung, Scottish actress
- August 11 – Greysia Polii, Indonesian badminton player
- August 16
  - Eri Kitamura, Japanese voice actress and singer
  - Okieriete Onaodowan, Nigerian actor
  - Carey Price, Canadian ice hockey goaltender
- August 18 – Joanna Jędrzejczyk, Polish mixed martial artist and kickboxer
- August 19 – Nico Hülkenberg, German racing driver
- August 20
  - Cătălina Ponor, Romanian gymnast
  - Tulus, Indonesian singer
- August 21 – Anton Shipulin, Russian biathlete
- August 24 – Anže Kopitar, Slovene ice hockey player
- August 25
  - Liu Yifei, Chinese actress
  - Blake Lively, American actress
  - Amy Macdonald, Scottish singer and songwriter
  - Rona Nishliu, Albanian singer, radio presenter, and humanitarian
- August 29 – Marko Podraščanin, Serbian volleyball player
- August 30 – Roy Krishna, Fijian footballer

=== September ===
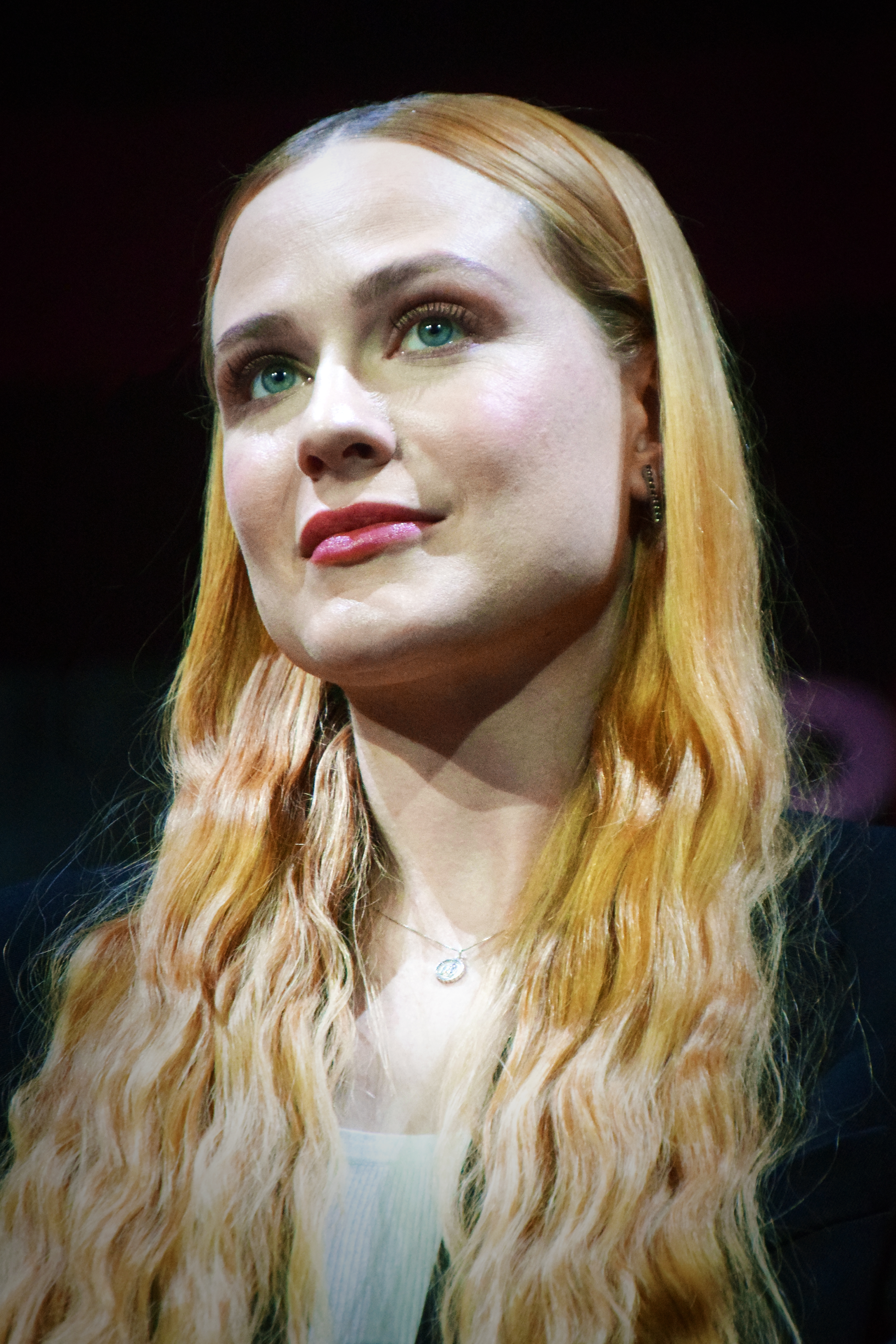
Evan Rachel Wood

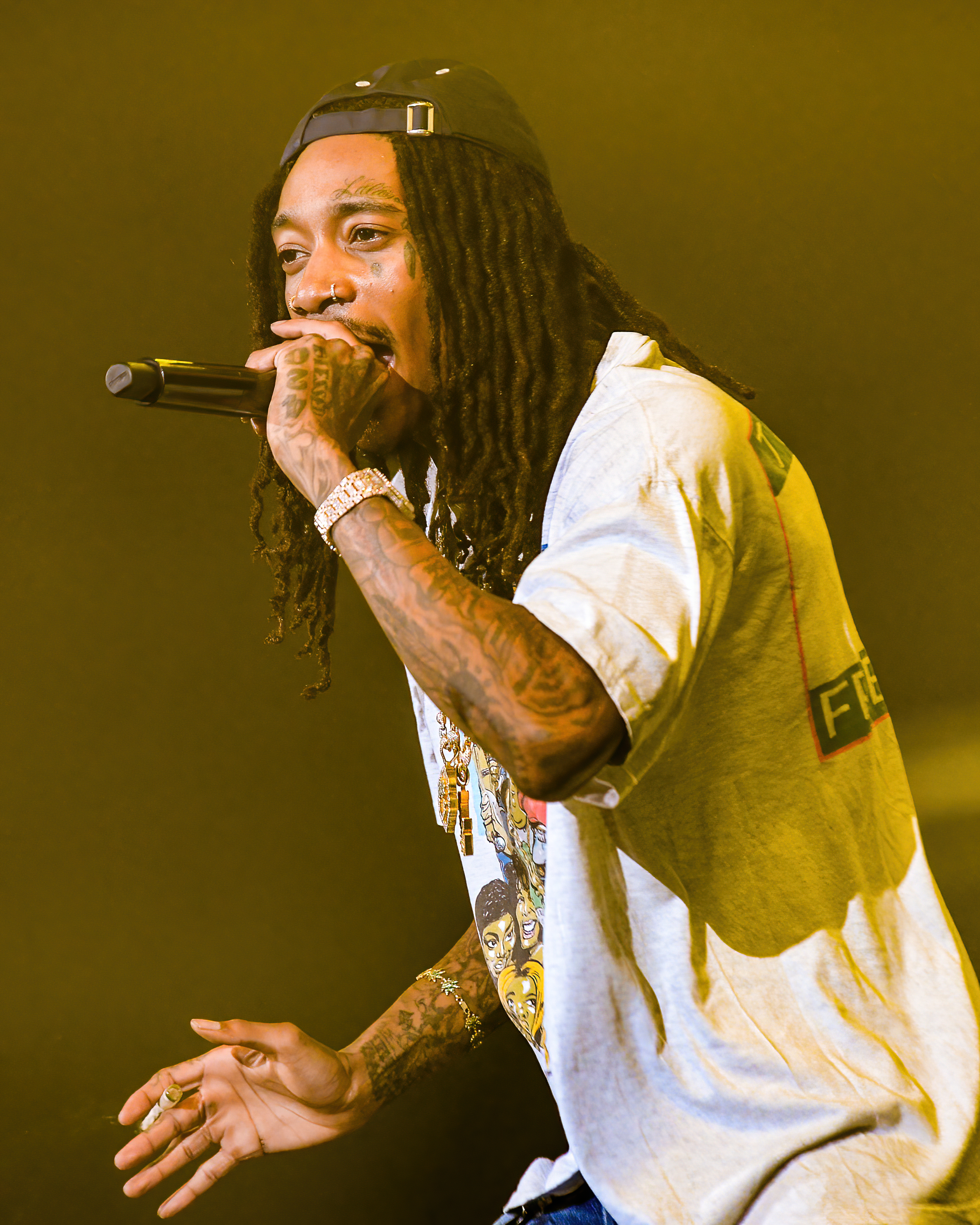
Wiz Khalifa

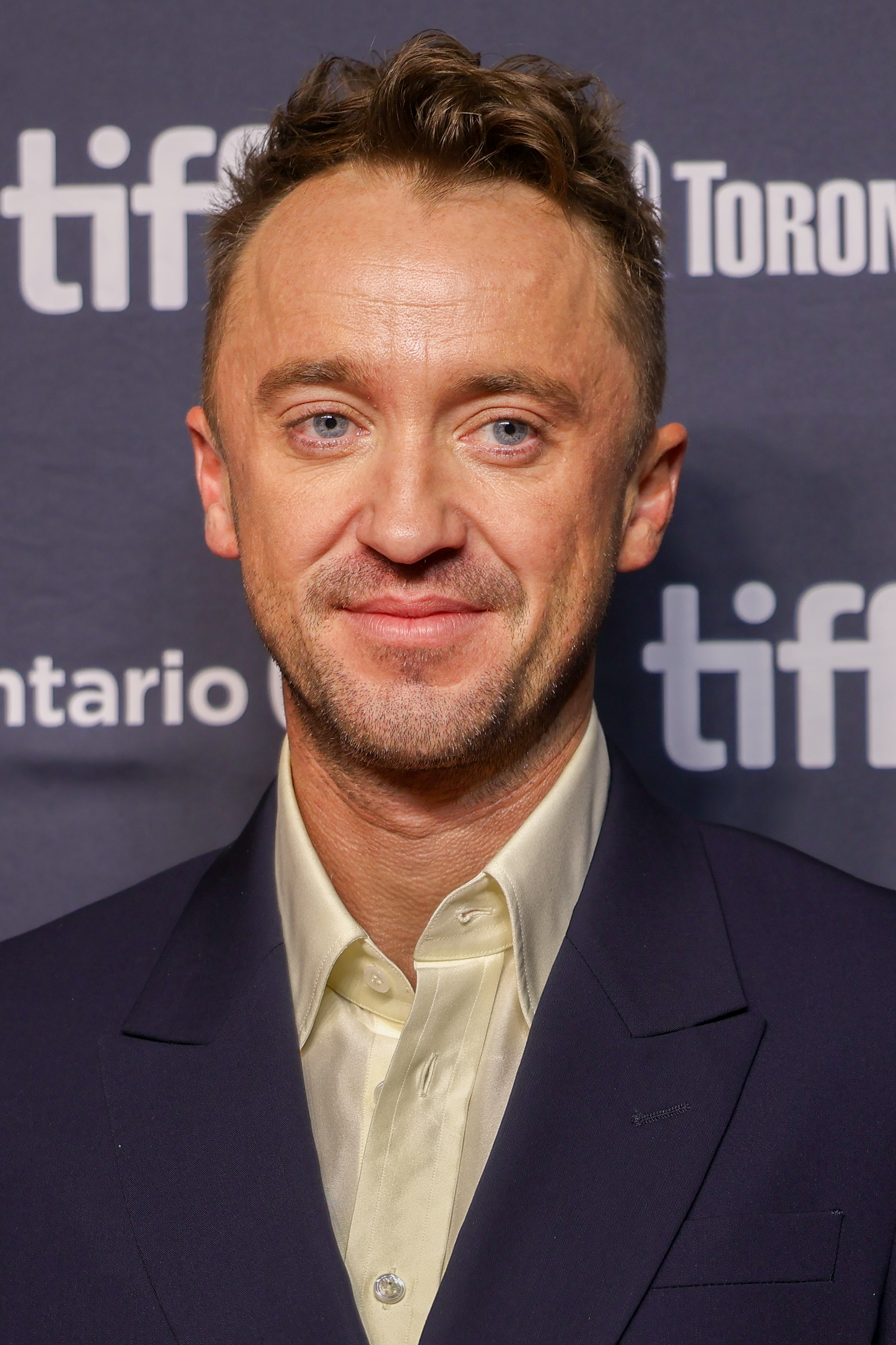
Tom Felton

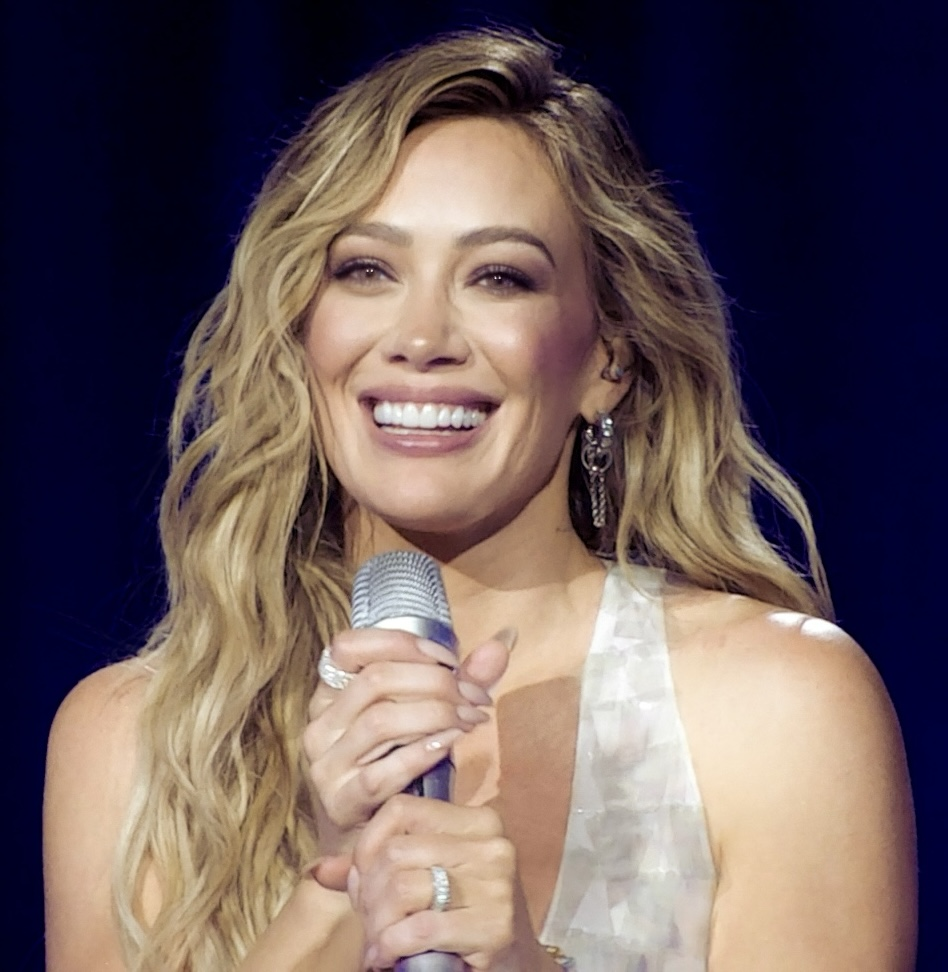
Hilary Duff

- September 1 – Leonel Suárez, Cuban decathlete
- September 2 – Scott Moir, Canadian figure skater
- September 3
  - Flora Duffy, Bermudian triathlete
  - James Neal, Canadian ice hockey player
- September 4 – Maryna Linchuk, Belarusian model
- September 6 – Anna Pavlova, Russian artistic gymnast
- September 7
  - Mohammad Ahsan, Indonesian badminton player
  - Denis Istomin, Russian born-Uzbek tennis player
  - Evan Rachel Wood, American actress and singer
  - Aleksandra Wozniak, Canadian tennis player
- September 8
  - Wiz Khalifa, American rapper
  - Alexandre Bilodeau, Canadian freestyle skier
- September 9
  - Afrojack, Dutch DJ and music producer
  - Ahmed Elmohamady, Egyptian footballer
  - Andrea Petkovic, Bosnian born-German tennis player
  - Alex Song, Cameroonian footballer
  - Clayton Snyder, American actor
  - Milan Stanković, Serbian pop-folk singer
- September 11
  - Elizabeth Henstridge, English actress
  - Tyler Hoechlin, American actor
  - Susianna Kentikian, German-Armenian boxer
  - Ilija Spasojević, Indonesian footballer
- September 12 – Yaroslava Shvedova, Kazakhstani tennis player
- September 15 – Aly Cissokho, French footballer
- September 19 – Danielle Panabaker, American actress
- September 21 – Ryan Guzman, American actor
- September 22
  - Tom Felton, English actor
  - Zdravko Kuzmanović, Serbian footballer
- September 25 – Monica Niculescu, Romanian tennis player
- September 26 – Jang Keun-suk, South Korean actor, singer and model
- September 27 – Luke Campbell, British boxer
- September 28 – Hilary Duff, American actress, businesswoman, singer, songwriter, producer, and writer
- September 29 – Anaïs Demoustier, French actress
- September 30
  - Ramy Ashour, Egyptian squash player
  - Aida Garifullina, Russian operatic soprano

=== October ===
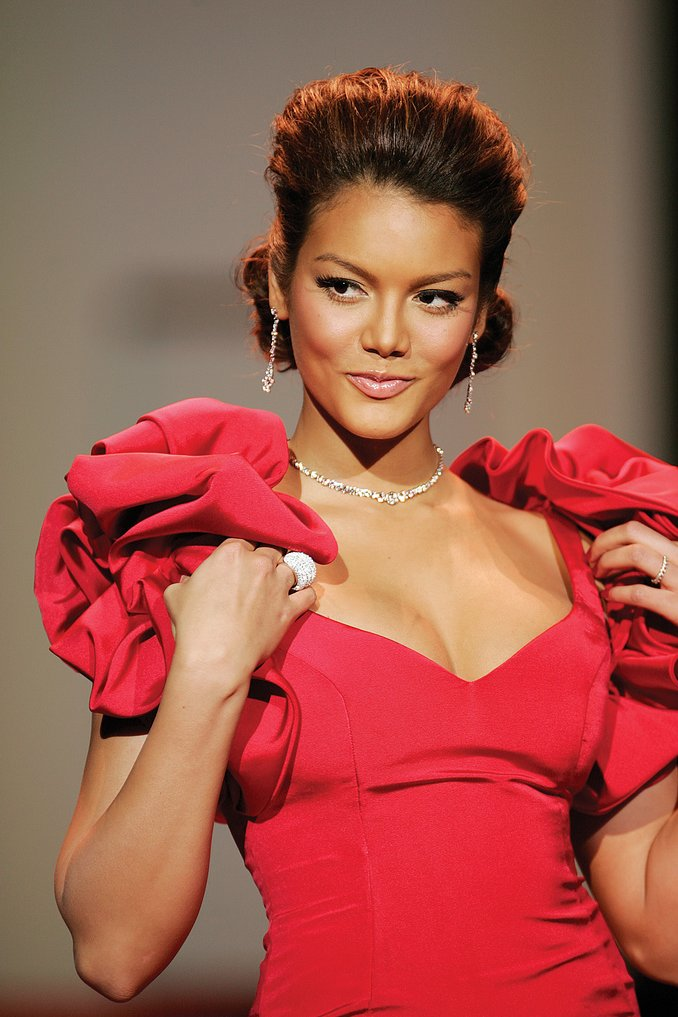
Zuleyka Rivera

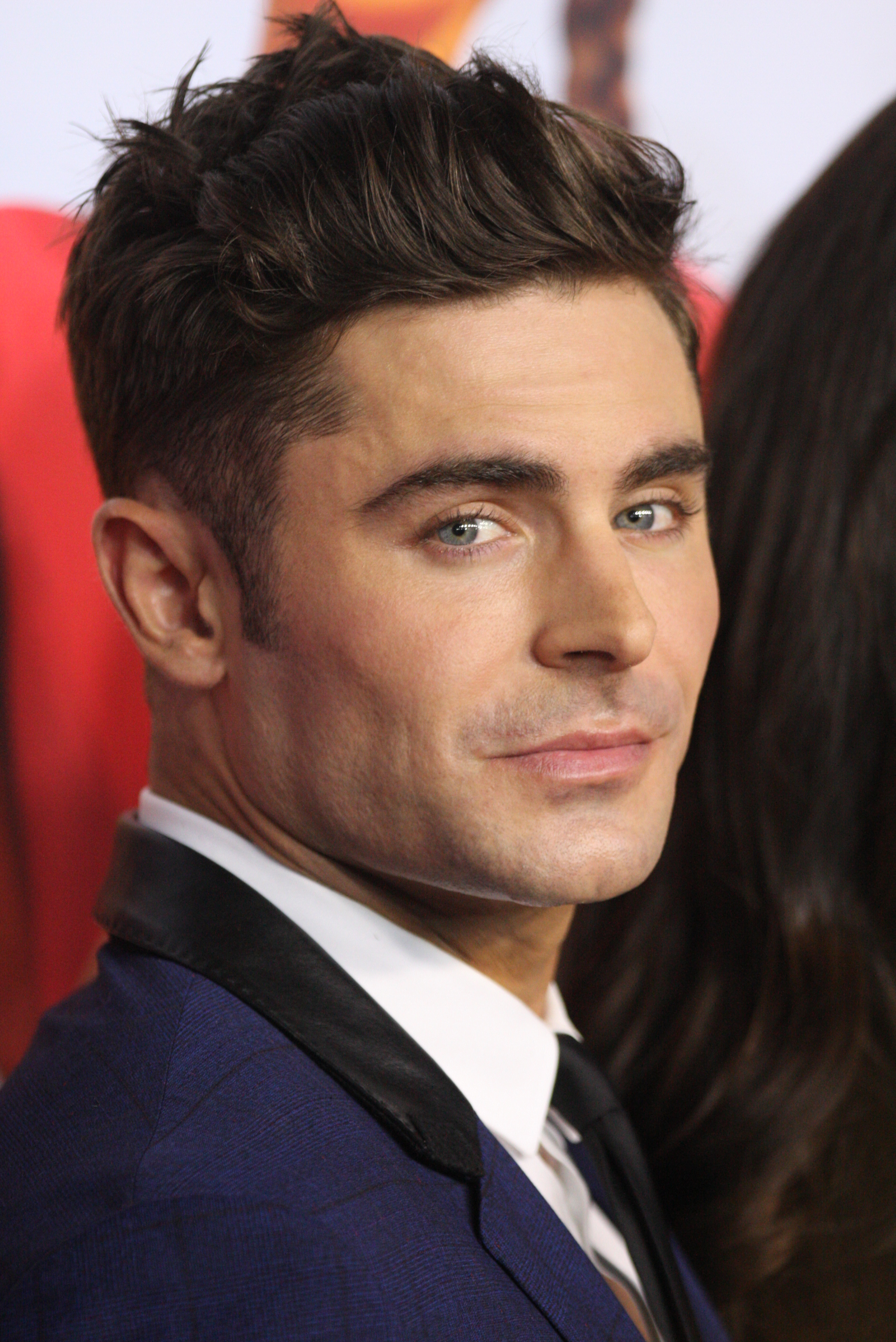
Zac Efron

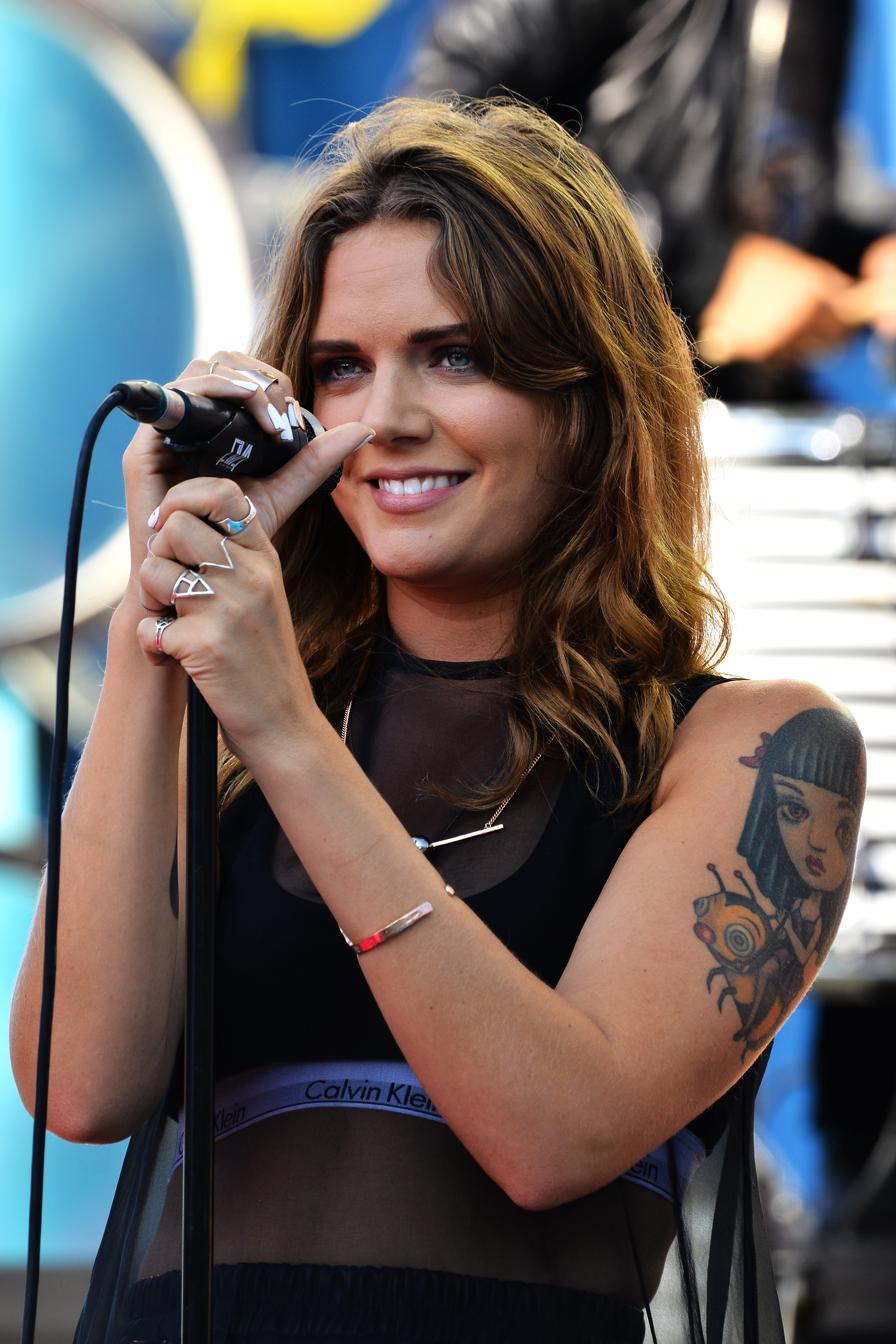
Tove Lo

Gibran Rakabuming Raka

- October 1
  - Gibran Rakabuming Raka, Vice President of Indonesia
  - Ketleyn Quadros, Brazilian judoka
  - Michaela Coel, British screenwriter and actress
  - Matthew Daddario, American actor
- October 2 – Joe Ingles, Australian basketball player
- October 3 – Zuleyka Rivera, Puerto Rican beauty queen (Miss Puerto Rico Universe 2006, Miss Universe 2006)
- October 5 – Foluke Gunderson, American volleyball player
- October 10 – Carla Esparza, American mixed martial artist
- October 15
  - Jesse Levine, American-Canadian tennis player
  - Mizuho Sakaguchi, Japanese woman footballer
- October 16
  - Seungho, South Korean pop singer (MBLAQ)
  - Michael Venus, New Zealand tennis player
  - Zhao Liying, Chinese actress
- October 18
  - Zac Efron, American actor and singer
  - Freja Beha Erichsen, Danish model
- October 23 – Carmella, American professional wrestler
- October 24 – Charlie White, American figure skater
- October 25 – Fabian Hambüchen, German gymnast
- October 28
  - Na Yeon Choi, South Korean female professional golfer
  - Frank Ocean, American singer-songwriter
- October 29
  - Tove Lo, Swedish singer and songwriter
  - Makoto Ogawa, Japanese singer

=== November ===
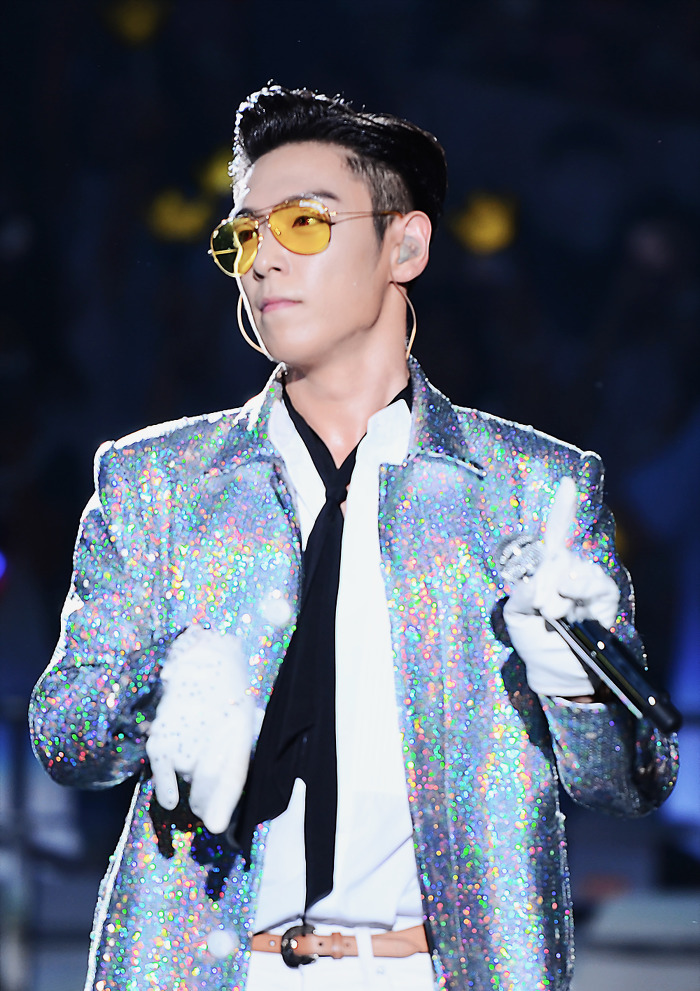
T.O.P

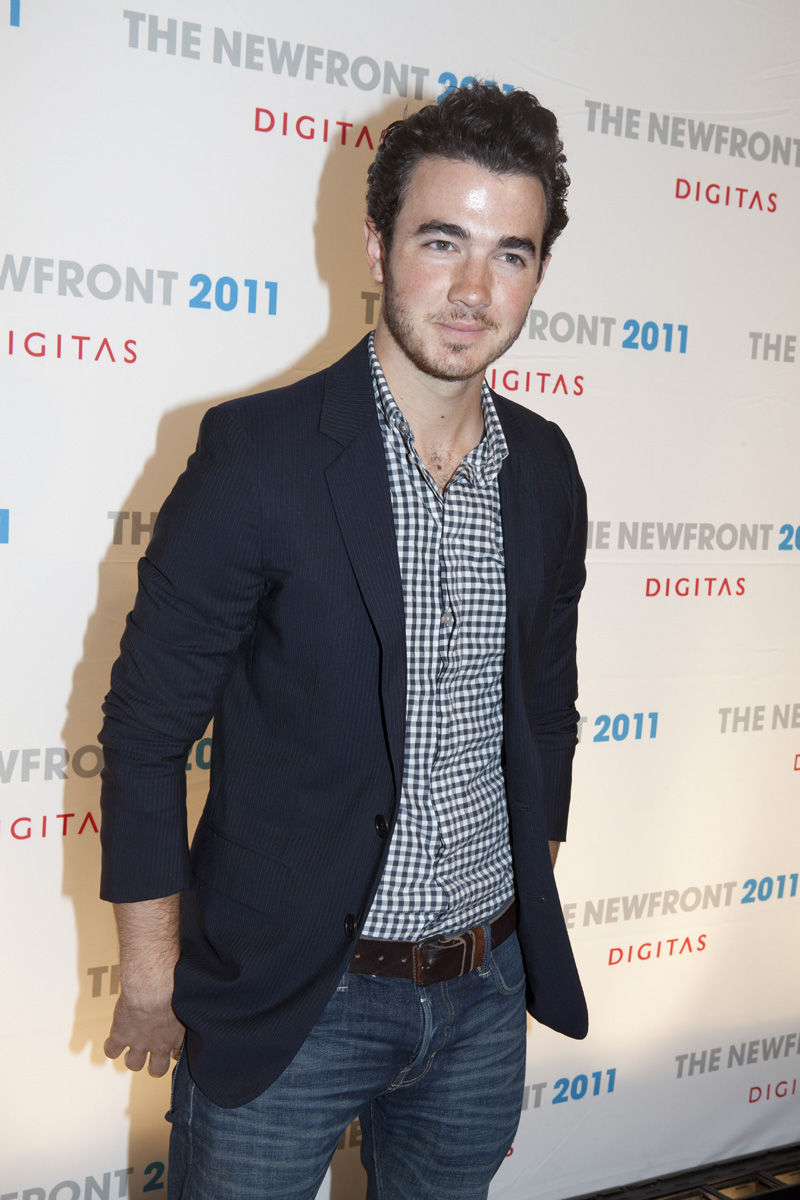
Kevin Jonas

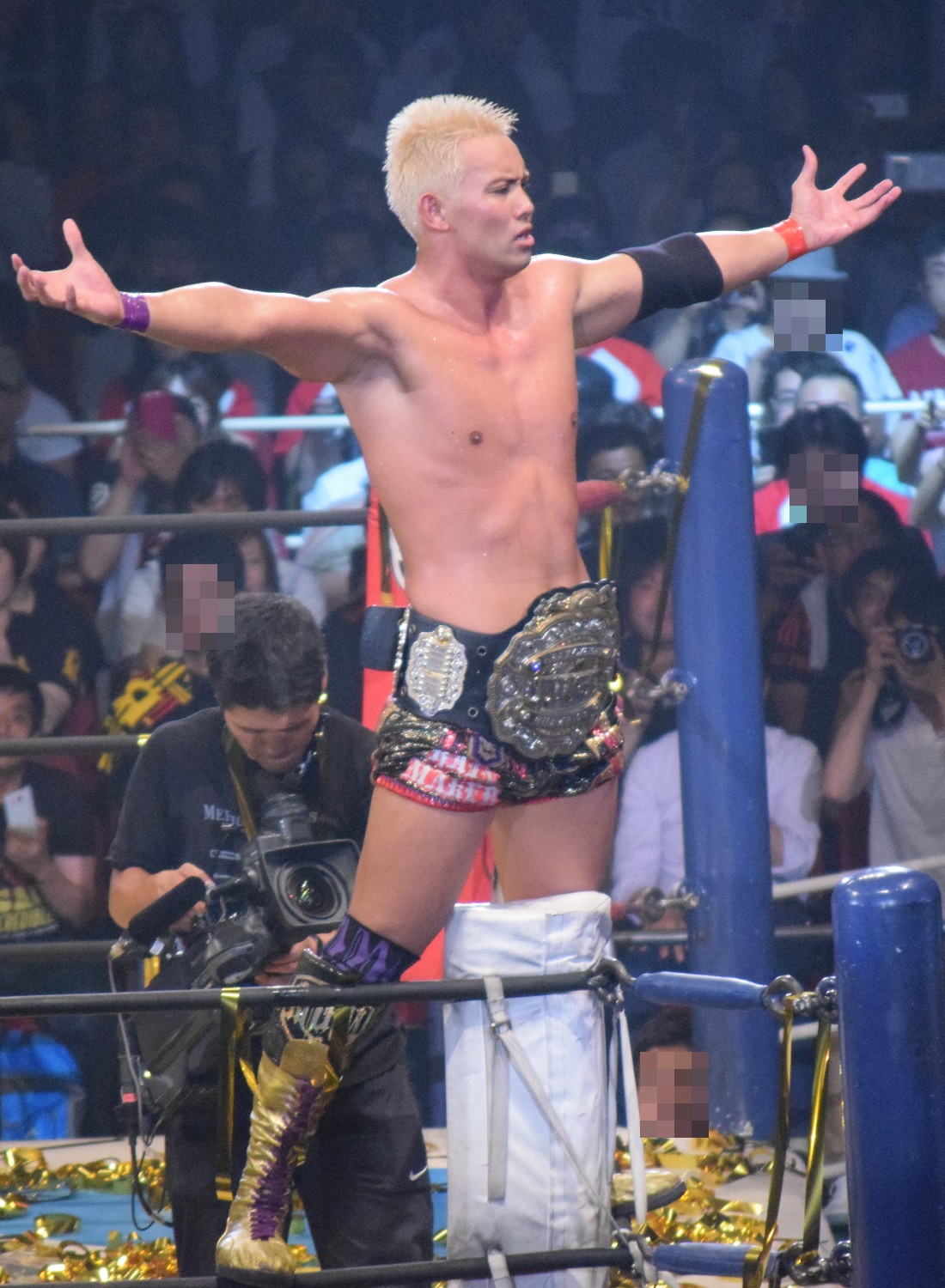
Kazuchika Okada

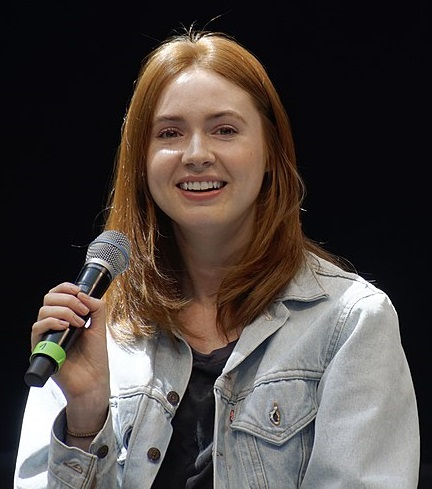
Karen Gillan

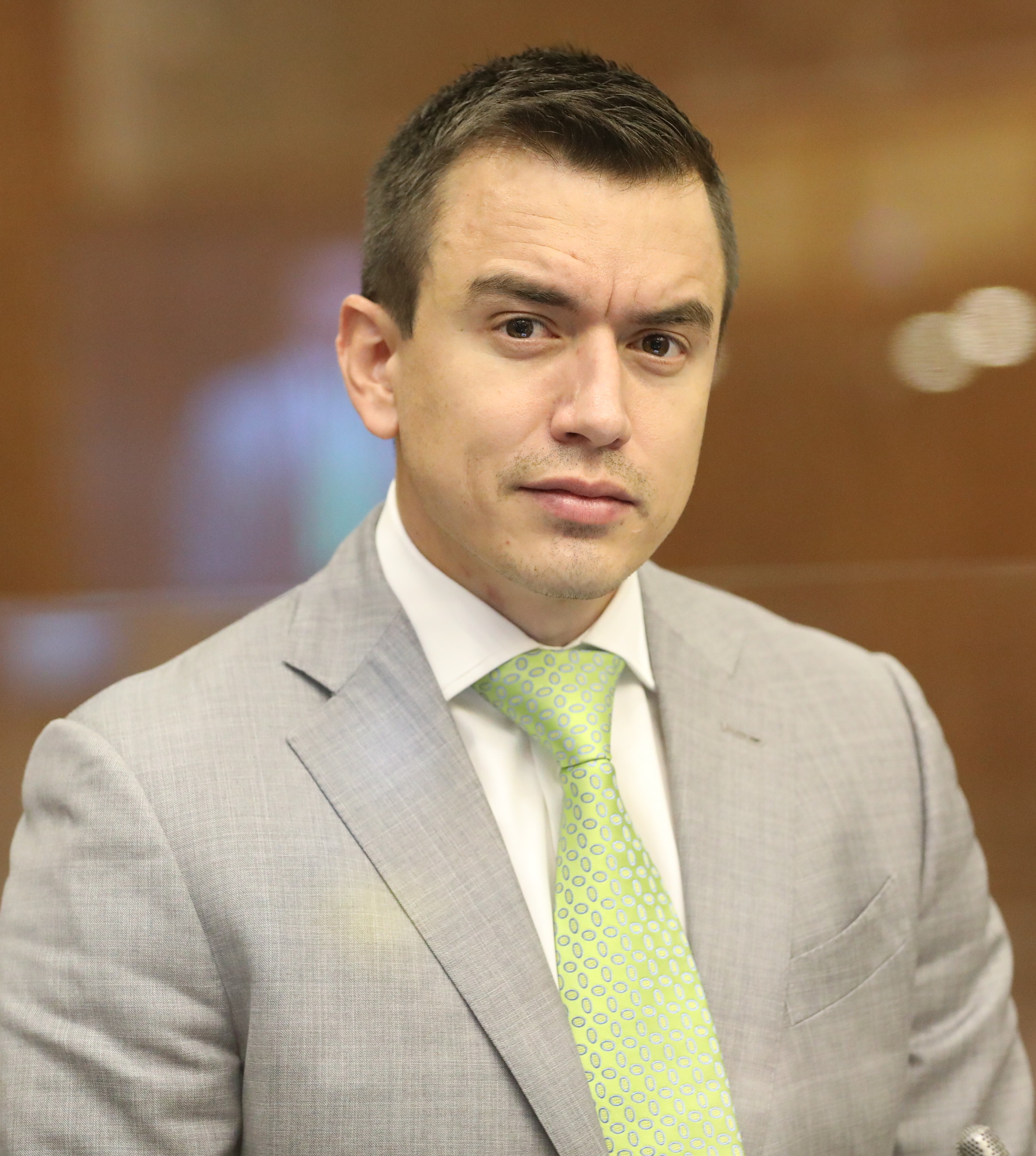
Daniel Noboa

- November 1 – Ileana D'Cruz, Indian actress
- November 3
  - Colin Kaepernick, American football player
  - Gemma Ward, Australian model
- November 4 – T.O.P, Korean rapper
- November 5 – Kevin Jonas, American actor and singer-songwriter
- November 6
  - Ana Ivanovic, Serbian tennis player
  - G.O, South Korean singer (MBLAQ)
- November 8 – Kazuchika Okada, Japanese professional wrestler
- November 9 – Nouchka Fontijn, Dutch boxer
- November 10 – Jessica Tovey, Australian actress
- November 11 – Yuya Tegoshi, Japanese singer (NEWS, Tegomass)
- November 12 – Jason Day, Australian golfer
- November 13 – Dana Vollmer, Australian swimmer
- November 15 – Sergio Llull, Spanish basketball player
- November 22 – Mauro Nespoli, Italian archer
- November 23
  - Nicklas Bäckström, Swedish ice hockey player
  - Kasia Struss, Polish model
- November 24
  - Maysoon al-Eryani, Yemeni poet and translator
  - Jeremain Lens, Dutch footballer
- November 26 – Kat DeLuna, American singer
- November 28 – Karen Gillan, Scottish actress
- November 30 – Daniel Noboa, President of Ecuador and businessman

=== December ===
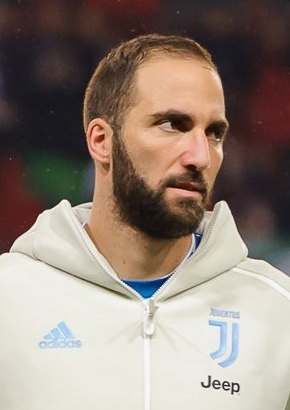
Gonzalo Higuaín

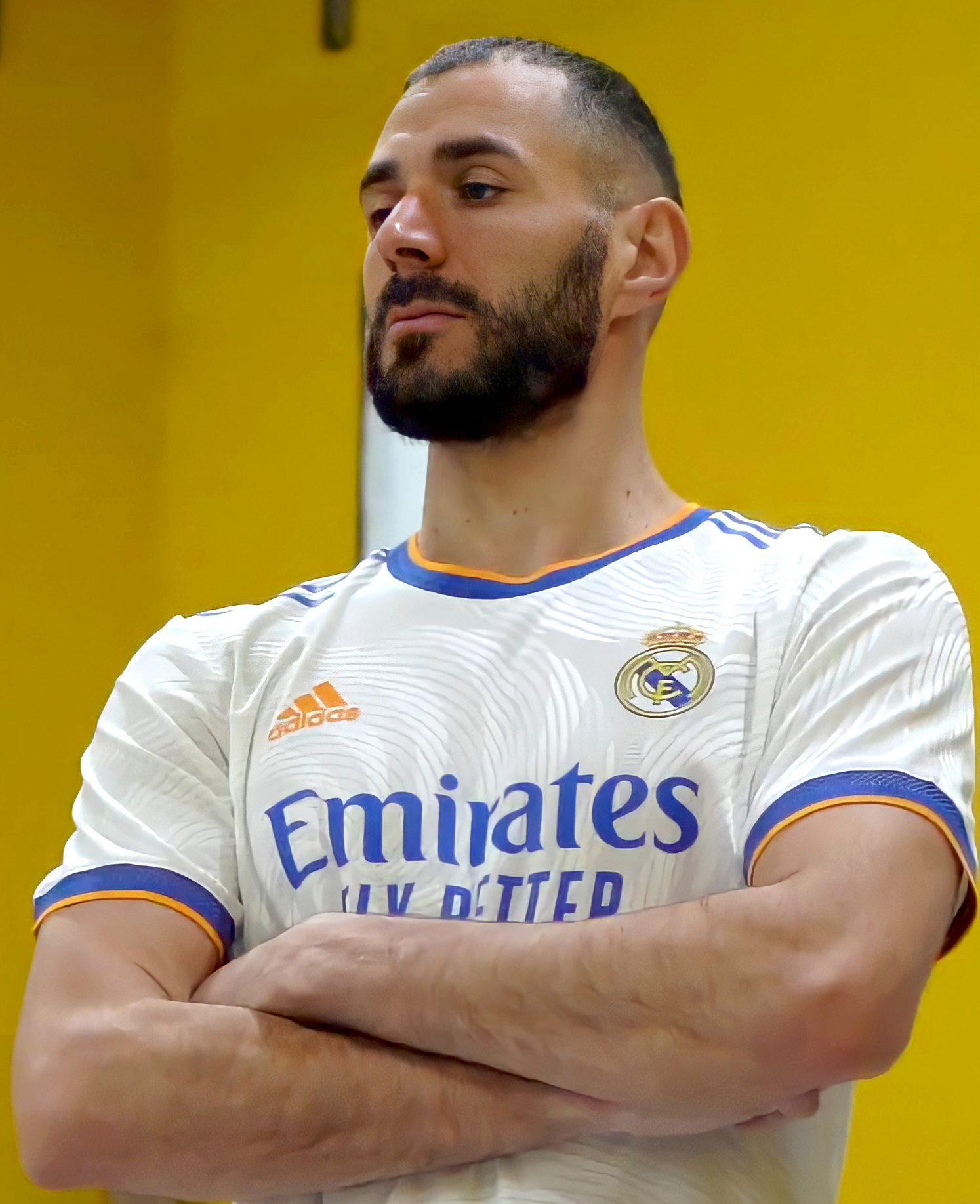
Karim Benzema

- December 1 – Sarah Snook, Australian actress
- December 3 – Alicia Sacramone, American gymnast
- December 9
  - Hikaru Nakamura, Japanese born-American chess grandmaster
  - Keri-anne Payne, South African born-British swimmer
- December 10 – Gonzalo Higuaín, Argentine footballer
- December 11
  - Amir Aliakbari, Iranian wrestler and mix martial artist
  - Shane Gillis, American stand-up comedian
- December 12 – Lao Lishi, Chinese diver
- December 15 – Mikey Garcia, American boxer
- December 18
  - Miki Ando, Japanese figure skater
  - Ayaka, Japanese singer
  - Deiveson Figueiredo, Brazilian martial mixed artist
  - Yuki Furukawa, Japanese actor
- December 19
  - Shuko Aoyama, Japanese tennis player
  - Karim Benzema, French footballer
  - Ronan Farrow, American activist
- December 20 – Emmanuel Ekpo, Nigerian footballer
- December 22 – Eder, Portuguese footballer
- December 23 – Taťána Kuchařová, Czech dancer, model and beauty queen
- December 25 – LJ Reyes, Filipino actress
- December 26 – Mikhail Kukushkin, Russian born-Kazakh tennis player
- December 27 – Lily Cole, British model
- December 29 – Iain De Caestecker, Scottish actor
- December 30 – Jeanette Ottesen, Danish swimmer
- December 31
  - Seydou Doumbia, Ivorian football player
  - Émilie Le Pennec, French gymnast

== Nobel Prizes ==

- Physics – J. Georg Bednorz, Karl Alexander Müller
- Chemistry – Donald J. Cram, Jean-Marie Lehn, Charles J. Pedersen
- Medicine – Susumu Tonegawa
- Literature – Joseph Brodsky
- Peace – Óscar Arias Sánchez
- Bank of Sweden Prize in Economic Sciences in Memory of Alfred Nobel – Robert Solow
