= Canterbury High School (Ottawa) =

High school in Ottawa, Canada

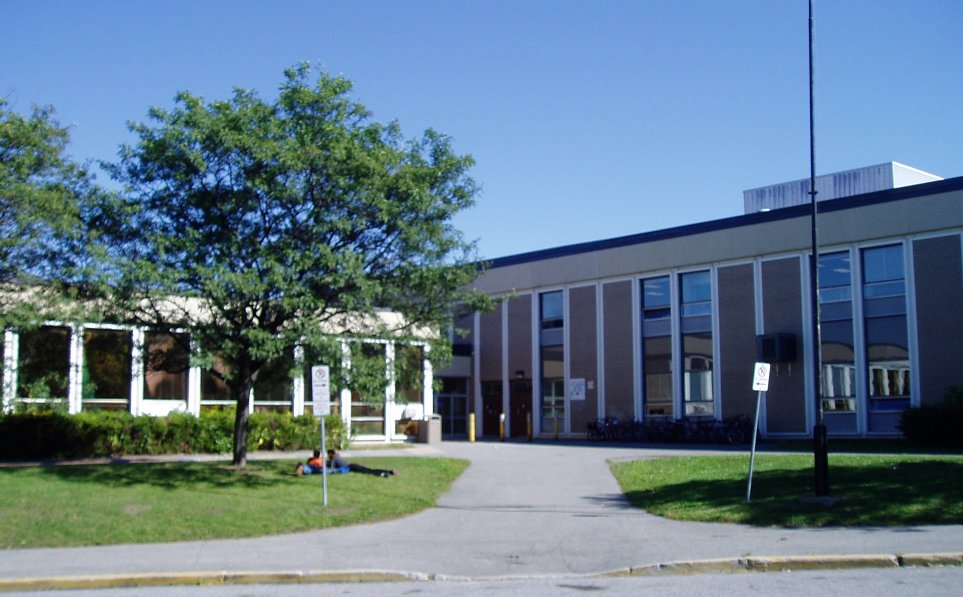

Location
- 900 Canterbury Avenue; Ottawa, Ontario, K1G 3A7; Canada; 45°23′18″N 75°37′35″W

Information
- Founded: 1969
- School board: Ottawa Carleton District School Board
- Superintendent: Neil Yorke-Slader
- Area trustee: Chris Ellis
- Principal: John Unsworth
- Enrollment: 1,360 (2022)
- Campus type: Suburban
- Colours: Blue and gold
- Team name: Chargers
- Website: canterburyhs.ocdsb.ca

Canterbury High School is an Ottawa-Carleton District School Board high school in the Urbandale neighbourhood of Ottawa, Ontario, Canada. It is an arts magnet school which draws in students from the Ottawa area to their specialized arts program.

== History ==
The school opened in 1969 as a comprehensive high school. It was the last in a series of ten high schools built by the Collegiate Board to deal with a growing population of teenagers. At the time of its opening, it was considered an extremely modern school, employing all the latest ideas in education. Most notably, many of its walls were movable (no longer a feature), allowing for an easy reorganization of space. It also had one of the largest libraries and auditoriums of any Ottawa area school. From 1969 to 1976, Canterbury offered a technical program based in aerospace engineering. The school operated a 1969 Cessna 190J (CF-CHS) and a Schweitzer 2-33 glider (CF-ABE), providing unique research opportunities to students. However, the Ottawa Board of Education eventually withdrew support due to liability issues.

The school's arts program began in 1983, making Canterbury High School an arts magnet school for the Ottawa-Gatineau region. There are five different arts programs that students must audition and interview for to be accepted into: dance, dramatic arts, literary arts, music (winds and percussion, strings, or voice), and visual arts, While Keeping it's General program .

The school maintains an athletics program which includes wrestling, rowing, swimming, volleyball, baseball, basketball, soccer, football, water polo, curling, ultimate frisbee, ice hockey, rugby, track & field, and ringette (added in 2021-22).

== Notable alumni ==
- Ashton Baumann, swimmer
- Mark Bell, hockey player
- Raoul Bhaneja, actor, musician
- Brian Campbell, hockey player
- Alexander Carson, filmmaker
- Penelope Corrin, actress/comedian
- Shean Donovan, hockey player
- Matthew Edison, actor/playwright
- Martin Gero, writer/producer
- Stephen Gray, rugby player
- Chester Hansen, musician
- Jessica Holmes, actress/comedian
- Jonathan Hobin, artist
- Simon Huck, PR executive/reality star
- Peter Hume, politician
- Genevieve LeBlanc, also known as Cyril Cinder, drag king
- Alyn McCauley, hockey player
- Hannah McGregor, academic
- Moira J. Moore, author
- Stephanie Moore, actress/writer
- Ty Olsson, actor
- Richard Parry, musician
- Michael Peca, hockey player
- Emma Portner, dancer, choreographer
- Gary Roberts, hockey player
- Jeremy Roberts, politician
- Leith Ross, singer
- Vik Sahay, actor
- Jordan Tannahill, playwright
- Emma Taylor-Isherwood, actress
- Sally Taylor-Isherwood, actress
- Meryl McMaster, artist
- Deirdre Barnes, dancer
- Andre Alexis, author

== See also ==
- Education in Ontario
- List of secondary schools in Ontario
