= The Upstairs Downstairs Bears =

Animated children's television series

- Also known as: Upstairs Downstairs Bears
- Genre: Preschool; Stop motion
- Created by: Carol Lawson; Gresham Films
- Based on: The Upstairs Downstairs Bears series by Carol Lawson
- Voices of: Sonja Ball; Kathleen Flaherty; Oliver Grainger; Harry Hill; Emma Isherwood; Sally Isherwood; Michael Lamport
- Theme music composer: Mark Giannetti
- Opening theme: "The Upstairs Downstairs Bears"
- Ending theme: "The Upstairs Downstairs Bears" (instrumental)
- Composer: Jeff Fisher
- Countries of origin: United Kingdom; Canada
- Original language: English
- No. of seasons: 1
- No. of episodes: 13 (26 segments)

Production
- Executive producers: Elizabeth Partyka; Poul Kofod; David Ferguson
- Producers: Charlotte Damgaard; Cassandra Schafhausen; Kath Yelland (for FilmFair)
- Running time: 22 minutes (11 minutes per short)
- Production companies: Scottish Television Enterprises; CINAR Corporation; CINAR Europe; Egmont Imagination; FilmFair

Original release
- Network: ITV (CITV) (UK); Teletoon (Canada)
- Release: September 3 – December 7, 2001

The Upstairs Downstairs Bears is a children's stop-motion animated series. Produced by Scottish Television Enterprises and Canada's Cinar (now WildBrain) in co-production with Egmont Imagination in Denmark, in association with Imagination Production and FilmFair Animation, it is based on the eponymous series of books by the show's creator Carol Lawson. The series was broadcast on CITV in the United Kingdom and Teletoon in Canada. It consists of a single season of 13 half-hour episodes, or 26 shorts.

== Premise ==
The show is about two families of teddy bears who live in an Edwardian townhouse, and emphasizes the importance of sharing for the preschool audience.

== Voice cast ==
- Sonja Ball as Henrietta Bosworth
- Kathleen Flaherty as Mrs. Bumble
- Oliver Grainger as Henry Bosworth
- Harry Hill as Barker
- Emma Isherwood as Polly Bumble
- Sally Isherwood as Alice Bosworth
- Michael Lamport as Freddy

== Episodes ==
| No. | Title | Written by | Canadian air date |
|---|---|---|---|
| 1a | "The Magic Hat" | Sally Ann Lever | September 3, 2001 |
| 1b | "The Lost Kite" | Sally Ann Lever | September 3, 2001 |
| 2a | "Mrs. Bumble's Birthday" | Simon Jowett | September 4, 2001 |
| 2b | "Henrietta's Cleaning Day" | Simon Jowett | September 4, 2001 |
| 3a | "Bears Who Go Bump in the Night" | Mike James | September 5, 2001 |
| 3b | "Family Portrait" | Mike James | September 5, 2001 |
| 4a | "The Telephone" | Sally Ann Lever | September 6, 2001 |
| 4b | "The Chimney Sweep" | Sally Ann Lever | September 6, 2001 |
| 5a | "The Lovely Day Outing" | Jeanne Willis | September 7, 2001 |
| 5b | "The Music Lesson" | Jeanne Willis | September 7, 2001 |
| 6a | "The Treasure Hunt" | Mike James | September 10, 2001 |
| 6b | "An Abundance of Peas" | Jennifer Lupinacci | September 10, 2001 |
| 7a | "Wash Day" | Simon Jowett | September 11, 2001 |
| 7b | "Arthur's Art Attack" | Simon Jowett | September 11, 2001 |
| 8a | "A Visit From Aunt Agatha" | Mike James | September 12, 2001 |
| 8b | "Fix-it Freddy" | Peter Hynes | September 12, 2001 |
| 9a | "The Bring 'n' Buy Sale" | Mike James | September 13, 2001 |
| 9b | "The Last Card" | Simon Jowett | September 13, 2001 |
| 10a | "Who's Calling?" | Jeanne Willis | September 14, 2001 |
| 10b | "Jumping to Conclusions" | Peter Hynes | September 14, 2001 |
| 11a | "Singing Contest" | Jeanne Willis | September 17, 2001 |
| 11b | "Star Maker" | Peter Hynes | September 17, 2001 |
| 12a | "The Pantomime At No. 49" | Adrian Besley | November 19, 2001 |
| 12b | "Babysitting Baby Arthur" | Adrian Besley | November 19, 2001 |
| 13a | "A Winter's Day" | Simon Jowett | December 7, 2001 |
| 13b | "Christmas Bears" | Jeanne Willis | December 7, 2001 |

== Production ==
Illustrator and teddy bear collector Carol Lawson was reportedly inspired to create the franchise when she came across "a 'downstairs' bear dressed as a maid". It follows in the vein of the similarly titled 1971 ITV drama Upstairs, Downstairs, which also features the stories of two families living together under one townhouse roof.

Production of the series began in late 1998, with an anticipated budget of US$3 million. By early 2000, this had increased to US$3.7 million, similar to that of comparable children's television. The cost per episode was $430,000 as of October that year.

Egmont Imagination headquarters in Denmark handled construction of the puppets and backgrounds, which were then sent to the FilmFair studio in London for filming.

== Broadcast ==
The Upstairs Downstairs Bears was first broadcast in English on CITV in the United Kingdom on April 9, 2001. On Teletoon in Canada, it originally aired from September 3, 2001, to December 7, 2001. In the United States, it was broadcast on Smile.

On the French-language Canadian channel Télétoon, it was aired as Les oursons du square Théodore. Internationally, it was also seen on Minimax in Hungary, and Hop! Channel in Israel.

Czech Television's ČT Déčko has made the full series available for digital streaming.

== Reception ==
Toonhound had a positive impression of the series, stating: "With its period set details, golden brown shades and soft, sepia light this little show evokes just the right Edwardian atmosphere..."
