= Sally Taylor-Isherwood =

Canadian actress (born 1990)

- Born: Sally-Joy Taylor-Isherwood; March 23, 1990 (age 36); Toronto, Ontario, Canada
- Other name: Sally Isherwood
- Occupation: Actress
- Years active: 1999–present
- Relatives: Emma Taylor-Isherwood (sister)

Sally-Joy Taylor-Isherwood (born March 23, 1990) is a Canadian actress.

== Private life ==
Taylor-Isherwood is the younger sister of actress Emma Taylor-Isherwood. She has graduated from Canterbury High School, with a focus in the dramatic arts. Taylor-Isherwood has dual Canadian and British citizenship, and is fluent in both English and French.

== Career ==
She began her acting career at the age of 8 in the television show Revenge of the Land. The same year she acted alongside her sister Emma in Who Gets the House?.

One of her best known roles is as the final voice of Emily in Arthur after the departure of Vanessa Lengies until the end of the series in 2022.

She also did several voices on For Better or For Worse and voices Alice in Upstairs, Downstairs Bears, Clementine and Melanie in Caillou and Tori in Just Jamie.

She is currently represented by the Agence Claire Boivin Agency.

== Filmography ==
=== Television ===
Year	Title	Role	Notes
1999	Revenge of the Land	Lucie Hawke	Television film
2000	Nuremberg	Edda Goering	Episode: "Episode #1.1"
2000	Jackie Bouvier Kennedy Onassis	Jacqueline Kennedy Onassis (age 8)	Television film
2001	Tales from the Neverending Story	Yonie	4 episodes
2002–2006	Strange Days at Blake Holsey High	Josie's Clone	10 episodes
2003–2018	Arthur	Emily	Voice, 35 episodes
2004	Just Jamie	Tori Jenkins	4 episodes
2009–2011	Overruled!	Kali Stewart	29 episodes
2009	Aaron Stone	Samantha	Episode: "Chuck & Charlie"
2015–2018	Kuu Kuu Harajuku	Music	Voice, 156 episodes

=== Film ===
Year	Title	Role	Notes
1999	Who Gets the House	Amy Reece	
2000	Chocolat	Anouk	
2005	A Taste of Jupiter	Megan	
2008	Afterwards	Jennifer	
2017	Sahara	Alexandrie	Voice, English dub
