= Jacob Kraemer =

Canadian actor

- Years active: 2003–present

Jacob Kraemer is a Canadian actor from Fonthill, Ontario. He became known to young audiences after his role in The Elizabeth Smart Story, Ben Harrison on Disney and Family's Naturally, Sadie, and Jared "Coop" Cooper on Overruled!.

== Career and awards ==
In 2003, Kraemer played Andrew Smart in the CBS made for TV movie, The Elizabeth Smart Story. In 2005, he began to appear in a guest role on the Canadian-produced comedy television program Naturally, Sadie. Jacob appeared in two episodes of Naturally Sadie in the first season (as an extra) and most episodes in the second and third season.

He was nominated for a Young Artist Award for Best Performance in a TV series (Comedy or Drama) - Recurring Young Actor for Naturally Sadie in 2007. He was also nominated for Young Artist Award for Best Performance in a TV Movie, Miniseries or Special — Supporting Young Actor for the Elizabeth Smart Story in 2004.

== Filmography ==
- The Elizabeth Smart Story (2003) (TV) .... Andrew Smart
- Stump (2007) TV series .... Blake
- Naturally, Sadie .... Ben Harrison (27 episodes, 2005–2007)
- Degrassi: The Next Generation .... Golden Boy (1 episode, 2008)
- Overruled! (2009) TV series .... Jared 'Coop' Cooper (unknown episodes, 2009)
- Aaron Stone .... Baxley (1 episode, 2009
- Being Erica ....Paul (Season 4, Episode 5, 2011)
- Old Stock - 2012
