= Jim Rapsas =

Canadian television writer and producer

- Occupation(s): Television producer, writer
- Years active: 2002–present

Jim Rapsas is an American television writer and producer best known for creating the children's science-fiction series Strange Days at Blake Holsey High.

== Biography ==
Rapsas spent several years developing programs for the Discovery Kids Channel and served as executive producer on many of the channel's series including Scout's Safari, Growing Up Creepie, Kenny the Shark, Truth or Scare (hosted by Michelle Trachtenberg), Endurance, Flight 29 Down, Operation Junkyard, Trading Spaces: Boys vs. Girls, Time Warp Trio, Animal Jam and others.

Rapsas is a two-time Daytime Emmy Award winner for his role as executive producer on 2007 Outstanding Children's/Youth/Family Special Saving a Species: The Great Penguin Rescue hosted by actor Elijah Wood and 2008 Outstanding Children's Series Jack Hanna's Into the Wild. He has earned thirteen Daytime Emmy nominations over his career. He is also credited as writer and executive producer on the 2007 Animal Planet special Saving a Species: Gorillas at Risk hosted by actress Natalie Portman. He has also been the Executive Producer of many other series including Roseanne's Nuts, America's Most Wanted, Royal Wedding of a Lifetime and America's Supernanny.
