= Emma Taylor-Isherwood =

Canadian actress (born 1987)

- Born: Emma-Rose Taylor-Isherwood; April 27, 1987 (age 39); Toronto, Ontario, Canada
- Other name: Emma Isherwood
- Occupation: Actress
- Years active: 1996–present
- Relatives: Sally Taylor-Isherwood (sister)

Emma-Rose Taylor-Isherwood (born April 27, 1987) is a Canadian actress. She played the roles of Mona Parker in the animated television series Mona the Vampire and Josie Trent in the science fiction program Strange Days at Blake Holsey High.

== Biography ==
Taylor-Isherwood was born on April 27, 1987, in Toronto, Ontario. She began her career at the age of 9, with a voice role in the animated special Teddy Bears Rescue, before lending her voice for Miffy: Colors, Numbers & Shapes and Mona the Vampire. She has appeared in movies including Tales from the Neverending Story, The Shipping News and Who Gets The House.

Nominated for two Young Artist Awards for her roles in Mary Cassatt: An American Impressionist and Strange Days at Blake Holsey High, one of Taylor-Isherwood roles was of young Agnes in the Golden Globe nominated film The Shipping News directed by Lasse Hallstrom.

She played the free-spirited, adventurous intelligent, and intrusive Josie Trent on Strange Days at Blake Holsey High, also known as Black Hole High. At the 24th Annual Young Artist Awards (2003), Taylor-Isherwood was nominated for Supporting Young Actress in a TV series (comedy or drama), for the series. She was on a camping trip, when she found out she got the part as "Josie" on Strange Days.

She is represented by Amanda Rosenthall Talent Agency and Butler Ruston Bell Agency.

== Personal life ==
When Taylor-Isherwood was around 8 years old, she asked her parents if she could have acting lessons. She was in the habit of starting a lesson (such as dance or piano) and then quickly giving it up. So her parents made a compromise: she could take acting lessons if she made the money for it herself. Taylor-Isherwood began making papier-mâché hats. The Ottawa Citizen heard of it, and wrote an article on her. After that article, she made the money she needed to go to acting lessons.

She is the older sister of actress Sally Taylor-Isherwood.

Taylor-Isherwood attended Canterbury High School in Ottawa, where she graduated from the drama program in 2005. She played the part of Henry Higgins' mother in Canterbury High School's 2004 production of My Fair Lady.

Taylor-Isherwood has dual Canadian and British citizenship and is fluent in both English and French.

In 2009, she graduated from Carleton University in Ottawa, Ontario with a Bachelor of Arts degree.

After graduating from the Arts Canterbury Theatre program Taylor-Isherwood continued performing while attending university. After performing alongside Daryl Hannah in All the Good Ones are Married, Taylor-Isherwood headed to Britain where she completed third year studies in Mass Communication and Film at the University of East Anglia. Along with her film and communications courses she studied Shakespeare, British theatre and scene study.

While in England, she also volunteered and performed with the Minotaur Theatre Company on the university campus. Taylor-Isherwood completed her studies in Canada and was awarded High Honours in her Bachelor of Arts, (Communication /Film) degree. After completing certification in "The Art of Directing," through SIFT, she voiced both Holly Bear and Eliza, in The Secret World of Benjamin Bear, for Amberwood studios. She also acted alongside her sister Sally in the live action series, Overruled!. Emma also voiced Camille Wallaby in the animated series The Mysteries of Alfred Hedgehog, airing on TVO. She also played the British Elspeth in the animated series Gawayn.

== Filmography ==
Film
Year	Film	Role	Notes
1999	Who Gets the House?	Heidi Reece	as Emma Isherwood
2000	Ultimate G's	Young Laura	3D-IMAX
2001	The Shipping News	Young Agnis Hamm-age 12	
Film Made for Television
Year	Title	Role	Notes
1997	Shadow of the Bear	Guest appearance	
1999	Revenge of the Land	Hilda Hawke	
1999	Mary Cassatt: An American Impressionist	Elsie Foster Cassatt	as Emma Isherwood
2006	A Dad for Christmas	Megan Eubanks	
2007	All the Good Ones Are Married	Madison Gold	
Television
Year	Title	Role	Notes
1996	Teddy Bears Rescue	Tara (voice)	
1996	Miffy: Colors, Numbers & Shapes	Miffy (voice)	
1999–2000	Are You Afraid of the Dark?	Julie/Shelley	Julie (in 2000)/Shelley (as Emma Isherwood in 1999)
1999–2003	Mona the Vampire	Mona Parker (voice)	Main Role, 65 episodes
1999–2001	The Kids from Room 402	Penny Grant (voice)	Main Role, 30 episodes
2000	Upstairs, Downstairs Bears	Polly Bumble (voice)	
2002–2006	Strange Days at Blake Holsey High	Josie Trent	Main role, 42 episodes
2003–2009	The Secret World of Benjamin Bear	Holly/Eliza (voice)	
2003	Just Jamie	Rita (voice)	Episode: "Who's That in My Shoes?"
2009-2013	Gawayn	Elspeth (voice)	
2010	The Mysteries of Alfred Hedgehog	Camille (voice)	
2015	Kuu Kuu Harajuku	Angel (voice)	
Television Guest Appearances
Year	Title	Role	Notes
2001	Tales from the Neverending Story	Olano	3 episodes
2002	Galidor: Defenders of the Outer Dimension	Rom	
2007	The Morning Show with Mike and Juliet	Herself	
2009	Overruled!	Kelly	
