= Roseanne's Nuts =

American series by Roseanne Barr

- Official show logo
- Genre: Reality; Docudrama
- Starring: Roseanne Barr; Johnny Argent; Jake Pentland
- Country of origin: United States
- Original language: English
- No. of seasons: 1
- No. of episodes: 16

Production
- Executive producers: Roseanne Barr; JD Roth; Todd A. Nelson; Brant Pinvidic; Steven Greener; Rob Sharenow; Gena McCarthy; Jim Rapsas
- Producers: Jake Pentland; Tricia Horn
- Production locations: Big Island, Hawaii
- Running time: 20–22 minutes
- Production companies: 3 Ball Productions/Eyeworks USA; Full Moon & High Tide Productions

Original release
- Network: Lifetime
- Release: July 13 – September 16, 2011

Related
- The Real Roseanne Show

Roseanne's Nuts is a reality docudrama television series that features Roseanne Barr, her partner Johnny Argent and son Jake Pentland as they live on their macadamia nut and livestock farm in Hawaii. Celebrity guests that appeared included Bonnie Bramlett, Michael Fishman, Phyllis Diller, and Sandra Bernhard. The series originally aired on Lifetime.

The series premiered on July 13, 2011, with two half-hour episodes and received mixed reviews based on its first episode. Its premiere was watched by 1.6 million viewers becoming Lifetime's fourth most-watched unscripted series launch in total viewers, adults 18–49 and adults 25–54. By its sixth week it was down to 711,000 viewers and was moved from Wednesdays to Friday nights for its final three weeks. On September 21, 2011, Lifetime canceled the series.

== Cast ==
=== Main ===
- Roseanne Barr
- Johnny Argent, Barr's partner
- Jake Pentland, Barr's son
- Becky Pentland, Jake's stepmother
- Greg Cipes, a friend of the family

=== Guest ===
- Bonnie Bramlett
- Michael Fishman
- Phyllis Diller
- Sandra Bernhard

== Episodes ==
No.	Title	Original release date	U.S. viewers (millions)
1	"War of the Pigs"	July 13, 2011	1.6
Feral pigs threaten the farm by eating Roseanne's crops and nuts which prompts her to hire hunters to kill them. However, once a pig is captured Roseanne decides that she can not allow it to be killed and sets it free.
2	"The Curse"	July 13, 2011	1.5
Roseanne feels she has a curse which is to blame for her "out-of-control temper" and visits her friend Cathy Bilsky, a local spiritual healer. Even though it seems to help Roseanne's anger, she determines that being calm is boring for her. Tired of the constant cameras, she screams for the camera men to leave her house and to come back another day.
3	"Star Spangled Banner"	July 20, 2011	1.0
With the help of Bonnie Bramlett, Roseanne sings "The Star-Spangled Banner" at a local softball game. The last time she sang the national anthem in 1990 it was off-key and heavily criticized so she hopes this redemption will make amends to the people she offended.
4	"Life's a Snore"	July 20, 2011	0.9
In order to stop snoring and being encouraged by boyfriend Johnny Argent and son Jake Pentland, Roseanne has a sleep study done. She is found to have sleep apnea and must wear a C-PAP to sleep. Meanwhile on the farm, the chickens are not laying eggs; Pentland and Archie add a new fence to protect them against mongooses but they find one chicken named Henrietta dead and bury it.
5	"The Museum Blessing"	July 27, 2011	0.88
Roseanne calls a Shaman to bless her haunted historic museum.
6	"Mother's Day"	July 27, 2011	0.82
While Roseanne is out taking surfing lessons with Cipes, Argent and Pentland clean the house for Mother's Day much to Roseanne's surprise.
7	"Passover"	August 3, 2011	0.78
Roseanne cooks a Passover meal with the vegetables from her garden for her friends and family. Michael Fishman guest stars.
8	"Grannies Night Out"	August 10, 2011	0.85
Phyllis Diller, Sandra Bernhard, and Roseanne enjoy a girl's night out but Roseanne wakes up with a hangover.
9	"Food Truck"	August 10, 2011	0.76
Roseanne donates a truck full with vegetables from her farm to the needy.
10	"Weed Is Wack"	August 24, 2011	0.71
Roseanne anxiously travels to Los Angeles where she visits a doctor who can potentially help her obtain a medical marijuana license in Hawaii.
11	"Grrrl Power"	August 24, 2011	0.68
Roseanne visits a local high school to give a speech to young girls.
12	"Homecoming Parade"	September 2, 2011	0.52
Roseanne attends the Utah Pride festival.
13	"Camping"	September 2, 2011	0.54
Roseanne and her family go camping.
14	"Homeschooling"	September 9, 2011	0.70
Roseanne attempts to home school her grandchildren with disastrous results.
15	"Menopause for Dummies"	September 9, 2011	0.72
Roseanne struggles to rekindle her and Johnny's sex life when she suffers from menopause pains.
16	"Lu'au Launch Party"	September 16, 2011	0.62
Roseanne finally breaks into the market with her macadamia nuts. Friends and family celebrate with a Luau.

== Production ==
In 2007, Barr purchased the 2,212-square-foot ranch-style house and 46-acre property sight unseen known as Hidden Hamakua Farm in Honokaa/Hamakua on the Big Island, Hawaii for $1.78 million. She moved there from Los Angeles full-time in 2010. Crew from The Oprah Winfrey Show visited Barr's house and farm as part of the February 14, 2011 episode featuring Barr. She toured the cameras around while she picked macadamia nuts from her 2,000 trees, vegetables in her organic garden and gathered honey from a beehive. During the show she told Oprah that she was working on a reality show based on her new life as a farmer. The same day the episode aired, The Hollywood Reporter announced that Lifetime Television ordered 16 half-hour episodes produced by 3 Ball Productions/Eyeworks USA and Jake Pentland's Full Moon & High Tide Productions.

In October 2025, Barr sold the house and property for $2.6 million.

== Release ==
=== Ratings ===
Roseanne's Nuts premiered on Lifetime Television on July 13, 2011, with two half-hour episodes. The show became Lifetime's fourth most-watched unscripted series launch in total viewers, adults 18–49 and adults 25–54. The first episode drew 1,638,000 viewers with an 18–49 Rating/Share of 0.7. The second episode retained 90% of the first episode lead-in for the key demos and was watched by 1,488,000 viewers with a Rating/Share of 0.6.

During its second week the first episode brought in 1,037,000 viewers with a Rating/Share of 0.4, a three-point decrease from the premiere. The second episode remained at a 0.4 Rating/Share with 977,000 viewers. It did the same as repeats of Pawn Stars that aired before Rosanne's Nuts, but Pawn Stars had more total viewers. During its sixth week it dropped to 711,000 viewers, losing more than half its premiere audience and scoring a 0.3 Rating/Share. The season finale brought in 629,000 viewers with a 0.2 Rating/Share.

=== Critical reviews ===
Lifetime sent only the first episode to critics in advance. Mary McNamara of the Los Angeles Times wrote a positive review. She said, "There are no overproduced glamorous outings, no sound-track manipulated showdowns, no manufactured feuds — everyone in the pilot has the easy genial mien of friends helping out an odd but beloved neighbor. There's even a trio of local musicians providing a transitional tune", calling the result, "occasionally weird, occasionally hilarious show that is simultaneously a window into the life of an eccentric performer and a wickedly fun send-up of the genre, dating all the way to Paris Hilton and The Simple Life. She also compared a scene in the first episode where Barr hunts wild pigs to Sarah Palin's Alaska as a spoof.

David Wiegand of the San Francisco Chronicle gave a positive review and welcomed Barr back to television. He wrote: "She's foulmouthed, abrasive and suffers absolutely nothing gladly. Yet, as always, her own foibles crack her up as much as they do her boyfriend or visiting eldest son. The fact that she's completely unafraid to hold herself up to ridicule endears her to her audience". He also noted that a reality show format "probably fits Barr better than, say, another sitcom [...]". He ended his review: "The wild pigs might not want to stick around, but the rest of us should be willing to give Roseanne's Nuts a shot for a few episodes, at least. Scott D. Pierce of The Salt Lake Tribune wrote in his review, "As reality shows go, Roseanne's Nuts is pretty mild. Oh, she's bleeped a lot. And there's some blurring of nudity. (Ick.) But mostly it's just Roseanne being Roseanne on a macadamia nut farm".

Brian Lowry of Variety gave the show a negative review saying, "Like so many former primetime titans, it's perplexing to see Barr reduced to this [...]" and "Why Barr wanted to participate in this sort of "celebreality" unscripted sitcom—especially if she hates Hollywood as much as she says—is a little less obvious, especially since she professes not to need the money and, given her syndication bounty, shouldn't". David Hinckley of the Daily News gave it two out of five stars. He said, "Roseanne fans will be reassured, though not surprised, to hear that she sounds and acts exactly the same on the plantation as she did on her sitcom set".
