= Cyril Cinder =

Canadian drag king, psychotherapist, and activist

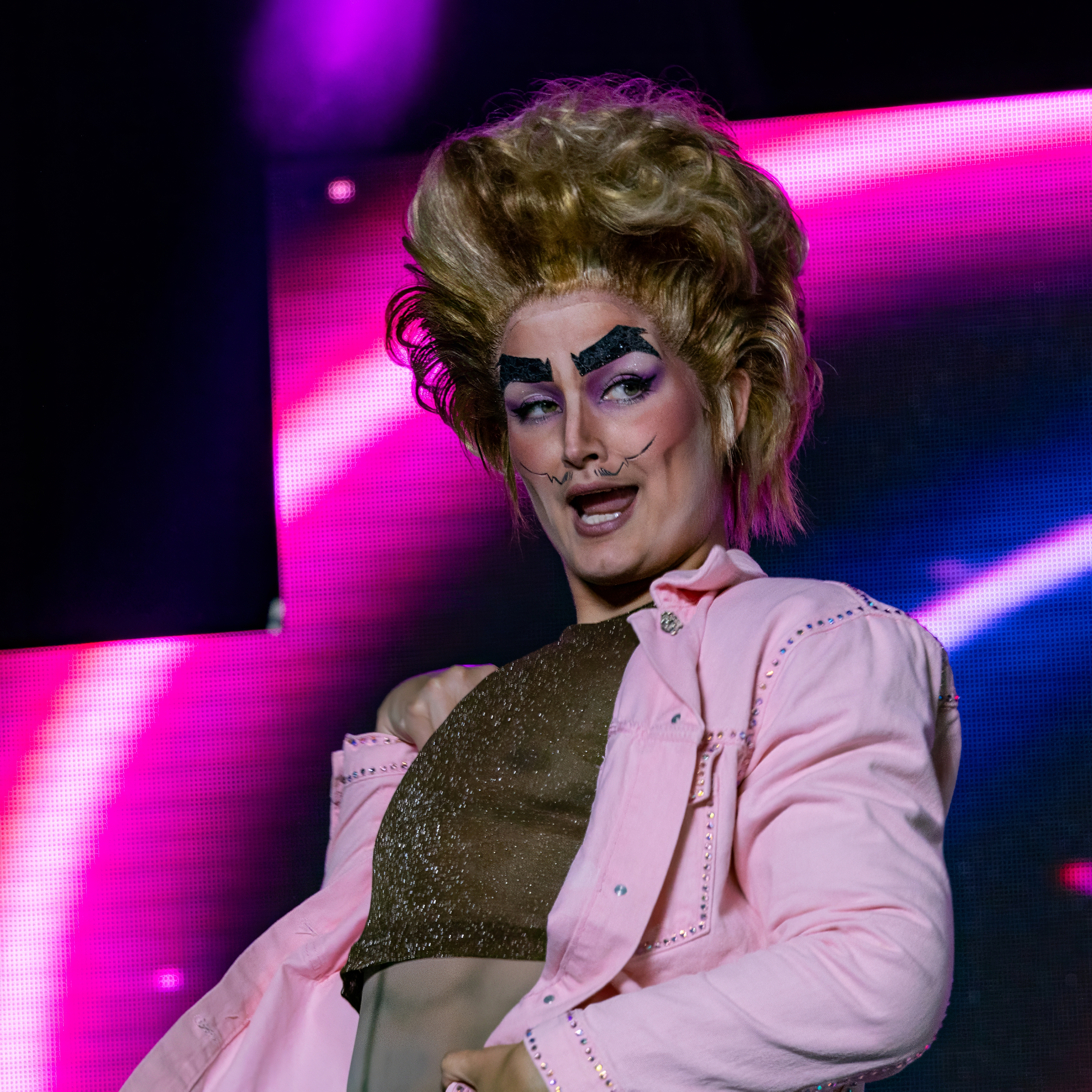
- Cyril Cinder performing at Windsor-Essex Pride in 2025
- Other name: Genevieve LeBlanc
- Education: Canterbury High School University of Toronto
- Occupations: drag king, psychotherapist, activist
- Years active: 2014-present

Genevieve LeBlanc (born 1991 or 1992), known by the stage name Cyril Cinder, is a Canadian drag king, psychotherapist, and activist. In 2025, along with HercuSleaze, he (Note: While in the Cyril Cinder persona LeBlanc uses he/him pronouns, while using she/her, he/him, and they/them singular pronouns while out of drag.) became the first drag performer to be invited into the chamber and address the Senate of Canada.

== Drag career ==
LeBlanc first learned that drag could go beyond drag queens as a young adult, and began planning a male drag persona. In 2014, only two months after seeing a drag show for the first time, their drag king persona Cyril Cinder was born and began performing. The Cyril Cinder character was inspired by the notion of “wholesome masculinity” and by My Chemical Romance singer Gerard Way. As a drag king Cyril Cinder found difficulties being booked in drag spaces and started performing in burlesque shows and spaces.

In 2019 Cyril Cinder was crowned Mr. Capital Pride at the Capital Pride Pageant. Following his win he has been a judge and a host on multiple subsequent editions of the pageant. He also won the inaugural King BoiPKG.

Cyril Cinder was a featured performer and mentor on the second season of Drag Heals. He was also featured in an episode of the Whispering Huntys podcast and interviewed for the fourth season episode "I Got 99 Problems But Being Misgendered on the Census Isn't One" of Statistics Canada's podcast Eh Sayers.

Cyril Cinder is part of l’Académie du drag, established in 2020 by l’Association des communautés francophones d’Ottawa as a program to help young Franco-Ontarians who are interested in starting drag.

Cyril Cinder also presents Drag Story time across Canada, with their Drag King Storytimes beginning in Ottawa as a collaboration with the Ottawa Public Library for Capital Pride. Cyril Cinder presented to the Canadian Council of Unifor is Halifax, Nova Scotia for pride in 2023, doing a drag storytime and discussing growing homophobia and transphobia. Cyril Cinder's drag story times have been protested on multiple occasions, with them receiving death threats and false allegations of grooming shared to their psychotherapy office. They also received threats of corrective rape.

In 2022 Cyril Cinder performed at the Calgary Stampede's first drag brunch.

In June 2025 Cyril Cinder, along with Montreal-based drag king HercuSleaze, were invited into the chamber of the Senate of Canada and introduced by Senator Kristopher Wells, becoming the first drag performers to address the Canadian Senate.

== Other work ==
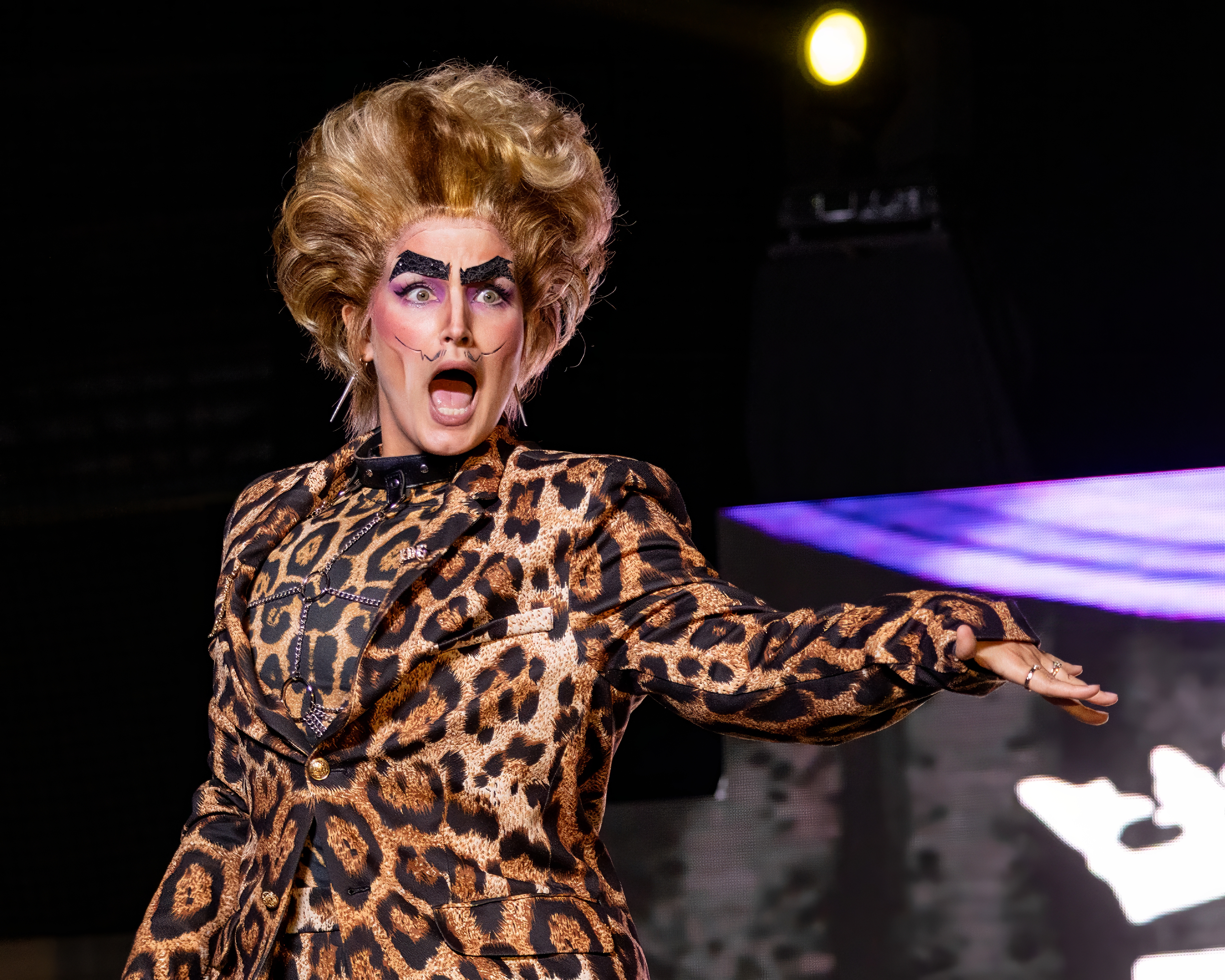
Cyril Cinder performing at Queens and Kings of Pride at Windsor-Essex Pride 2025

Outside of drag LeBlanc works as a licensed psychotherapist. They specialize in trauma and LGBTQ clients.

Both in and out of drag LeBlanc does public speaking engagements and workshops on drag, mental health, and activism. They are also an activist to disability, mental health and wellness, francophonie, and LGBTQ topics.

== Personal life ==
LeBlanc uses she/her, he/him, and they/them pronouns while out of drag, and he/him pronouns in drag. They are based in Ottawa, Ontario. LeBlanc is Franco-Ontarian. Performing in drag helped LeBlanc realize they are bisexual and non-binary.

LeBlanc is an alumnus of Canterbury High School's arts program.

LeBlanc lived in Toronto for two years, but moved back to Ottawa in part due to drag kings receiving less paid work than drag queens.

== Filmography ==
Television
| Year | Title | Role | Notes |
|---|---|---|---|
| 2020 | Drag Heals | Self | Season 2 |
| 2025 | DRAG! d'la tête aux pieds | Self | 1 episode |

Podcasts
| Year | Title | Role | Notes |
|---|---|---|---|
| 2021 | Whispering Huntys | Self | 1 episode |
| 2023 | Eh Sayers | Self | Season 4; 1 episode |
