= The Mysteries of Alfred Hedgehog =

Animated television series

- French: Les Mystères d'Alfred
- Genre: Mystery; Educational; Children's animation
- Created by: Mary Mackay-Smith; Merilyn Read
- Written by: Mary Mackay-Smith; Peter Saisselein
- Directed by: Frederic Dybowski
- Voices of: Carolina Bartczak; Emma Taylor-Isherwood; Angela Galuppo; Lisa Norton
- Composer: James Gelfand
- Countries of origin: France; Canada
- Original languages: English; French
- No. of seasons: 1
- No. of episodes: 26 (52 segments)

Production
- Executive producers: Clément Calvet; Michael Prupas; Merilyn Read
- Producers: Clément Calvet; Mary Mackay-Smith; Jesse Prupas
- Editor: Patrick Gonidec
- Running time: 22 minutes (2 11-minute segments)
- Production companies: Gaumont Alphanim; Muse Entertainment; Prickly Entertainment; Europool; Jiang Toon Animation

Original release
- Network: TVO/TFO/Knowledge Kids/Radio-Canada Télévision (Canada); France 5 (France); Qubo (United States)
- Release: January 9 – June 19, 2010

The Mysteries of Alfred Hedgehog is a children's animated television series created by Mary Mackay-Smith and Merilyn Read and produced by Gaumont Alphanim and Muse Entertainment. The show follows three anthropomorphic animal pre-teens—Alfred Hedgehog, Camille Wallaby, and Milo Skunk— as they solve mysteries in Gnarly Woods.

== Broadcast ==
The series has been shown on Qubo in the United States in 2010, Discovery Kids in Asia in 2012, and TVOntario as part of TVO Kids in Canada in 2011.

== Characters ==
=== Hedgehog family ===
- Alfred Hedgehog (voiced by Carolina Bartczak) is one of three characters appearing in every episode. He is the leader of the unofficial group in Gnarly Woods. He is the older brother of Lily Hedgehog, the son of Mr. and Mrs. Hedgehog as well as the eldest in the Hedgehog family. His eyes are green and his primary outfit is a white long-sleeved shirt which is covered in a blue t-shirt with cream-coloured khaki cropped pants. He is a young detective who carries a smartphone device called a "Detectaberry". With the help of his friends and family, he uses these clues in order to solve the mysteries, most of which have something in order to do with the natural world or science. Despite being a valuable detective, he can be cynical at some point when his team is jumping to conclusions or dealing with Cynthia. His catchphrase is, "This is serious mysterious!".
- Lily Hedgehog (voiced by Gracie Orr) is the little sister of Alfred Hedgehog with low pigtails decorated in red bows. She adores her big brother and often helps him with collecting clues in order to solve his mysteries. She is a surprisingly good painter considering her age, and it is mentioned several times that she is able to sell her paintings and enter them in art contests against much older competitors.
- Mrs. Hedgehog (voiced by Claudia Besso) is the wife of Mr. Hedgehog and the mother of Alfred and Lily. She wears a ponytail tied in a hairband and owns the house of the Hedgehog family.
- Mr. Hedgehog is the husband of Mrs. Hedgehog and the father of Alfred and Lily. He works as a beekeeper and is found as a solved mystery.

=== Alfred's detective friends ===
- Camille Wallaby (nicknamed Cam, voiced by Emma Taylor-Isherwood) stays on Alfred's side in any campaign. She is second-in-command of the group. She is friendly and generous, but she is sometimes hotheaded and in too much of a hurry. She has red hair which is tied in high pigtails with a melon pink hair clip on her left side and blue eyes. Her primary outfit is a cream-colored hoodie with a red skirt and blue and white boots. She is one of the three main characters to appear in all episodes and she is the only girl in "Ol' Fingerbone's Revenge!".
- Milo Skunk (voiced by Angela Galuppo) is the supportive character of the series. Unlike Alfred and Camile, he sometimes not goes with the team all because of his lack of courage in particular, or not taking the investigation too seriously like the other two. He has a vivid imagination and has low self-esteem; some people say that he is "extremely active", with a flair for the dramatic and often jokes around while solving cases. He wears gray glasses and is a good runner. His primary outfit is a yellow sweatshirt with brown long pants. He is one of the three main characters in order to appear in all episodes. He invented the Milo-nator (a pair of goggles that separate the sound from the video).

=== Payne family ===
- Cynthia Payne (voiced by Lisa Norton) is a pheasant and major antagonist of the series at times; other times, she will aid in the investigation, much to the displeasure of the gang that assists in her own ways. She is the only member of the Payne family to have a long tail. As one of the cheerleaders, she likes to use orange-colored pom-poms. She is a big fan of Ricardo (Richard) Rabbit and Razzy.
- Mrs. Payne (voiced by Linda Ballantyne) is Cynthia's snooty mother. She wears a pink suit. She runs a fundraiser mixed with an inflatable water slide and manicure in the episode "It Is Raining Fish!"
- Louise (voiced by Sara Camacho) is one of the cousins of Cynthia. She has purple feathers and wears a pink ponytail. As one of the cheerleaders, she uses light blue pom-poms. Also, she is one of the devoted fans of Ricardo Rabbit and Razzy. She is possibly Tina's sister due to how similar they look.
- Gabby is one of the cousins of Cynthia. She is the tallest of her cousins and as one of the cheerleaders, she likes to use light green pom-poms. She is one of the devoted fans of Ricardo Rabbit and Razzy, too.
- Tina is one of the cousins of Cynthia. She has periwinkle feathers with a plum-colored bob cut. As one of the cheerleaders, she likes to use magenta pom-poms. Also, she is also one of the fans of Ricardo Rabbit and Razzy. She is possibly Louise's sister due to how similar they look.

=== Gnarly Woods employees ===
- Mr. Russard (voiced by Terrence Scammell) is a red fox (Vulpes vulpes) and a teacher of Gnarly Woods Academy. He is a supporting character in the series. He has green eyes, orange hair, and is often seen wearing a blue vest over a white button-down shirt. He is often the coordinator of school and other events in the community. He is seen playing a flute in order to attract the fireflies.
- Rudy Gopher is Gnarly Woods' main gardener. He is very knowledgeable about plants and gardening, which proves very handy whenever Alfred and his friends are solving a mystery. In "The Mystery of the Heavy Feet" he got his feet stuck to a rock. In "The Great Flower Mystery" he gave Mr. Hedgehog a limestone wall.
- Doctor Anna (voiced by Kim Handysides) is a red fox (Vulpes vulpes) and the medical doctor of Gnarly Woods. She has gray hair (despite looking quite young), wears a lab coat, and is often seen carrying a first-aid kit. She first appears in an episode called "Who Knocked Out Grizz?", examining Grizz Kodiak deeming him a patient in Alfred's house. In "The Mysterious Sneeze", it is also revealed that she possesses her deductive reasoning which is similar to what she is employed by Alfred.
- Helmut is Gnarly Woods' famous artist. He appears to be an otter with blond hair. He is usually hired to sculpt or build something, like when the mother of Cynthia hired him to build a fountain and when asked to sculpt a statue dedicated to Ricardo. His works of art are somehow criticized when something unnatural happens.
- Grizz Kodiak is a tan bear and the local carpenter of Gnarly Woods. He has been knocked out by an unseen Asian carp in the episode called "Who Knocked out Grizz?". He is best friends with Rudy.
- Mr. Thomas (voiced by Kwasi Songui) is a wild boar and the school principal of Gnarly Woods Academy. He is often in charge of and likes to partake in various charity functions and sporting events in and around Gnarly Woods from hiking to racing.
- The Health Inspector (voiced by Arthur Holden) is another otter in Gnarly Woods. He first appears in "The Maple Syrup Mystery" as the syrup critic and also in "The Mystery of the Big Stink" as a superintendent. In "The Mysterious Fern", he is distracted by Cynthia Payne who wants him to take pictures of her. His real name is never revealed.

=== Normal animals ===
- Chloe is an owl and a supportive character of the series. She wears an orange-colored scarf and dark purple sunglasses with yellow frames, only in the episode called "Who, What, Where, When and How?". She lives in a tree that is isolated but she is easily reached by flight.
- J.J. Raccoon is a raccoon and a thief. He likes to take things that are either very shiny or valuable. Though after his debut in "The Eyes of the Thief" he swears to never steal anything again, but in "The Artful Art Thief", Cynthia accuses him of stealing the shiny ornaments on her tree that was intended to be an art presentation. But the true thieves were the baby magpies. He wears a red cap and carries a bag.
- Lugubrious (voiced by Jerome Bourgault) is a pond turtle and one of the minor characters of the series. In the episode "It is Raining Fish!", he has a fear of fish, so he hides in the mud in order to get away from the falling yellow perches.
- Lumis (voiced by Kwasi Songui) is an orange mountain lion with a pink nose. He wears a yellow vest with a pair of matching hand warmers. He usually scares the other characters (Milo in particular), due to his menacing appearance, and the fact that he is carnivorous.
- Minnie is a mole. She only appears in the "Great Flower Mystery" who complains about the soil that the flowers of the mother of Alfred and Lily are in that taste like "sour milk".
- Oakley is a beaver and another of the supportive characters of the series. He wears blue goggles and orange swimwear. He lives in a beaver dam near the river. In a flashback from "A Flash of Silver", he flees from his home while it collapses and he runs for cover to the house of the Hedgehog family. His mother is revealed at the end of this episode, but her real name is never revealed.
- Victor is a vole and one of the supportive characters of the series. He wears a yellow t-shirt. In "Maple Syrup Mystery", his No. 1 maple syrup award ribbon is taken away after trying to pass honey as maple syrup by accident but it is returned to him after the detectives discover why the maple trees have run dry of sap.
- Winston is a moose and one of the supportive characters of the series. He wears a purple harness. In the two episodes, Alfred and his best friends Camille and Milo ride on his back. Near the end of "The False Notes in Gnarly Woods", he gives them his antlers in order to make new flutes.
- Withers is a feral brown bear that lives near the lake of Gnarly Woods. He appears as a solved mystery in "The Phantom Footprints". The other appearances include "A Flash of Silver" and "Cabana Drama". He wears a napkin in "A Flash of Silver" and in "Cabana Drama", his only line is "Thank you, Polly!"

=== Other characters ===
- Barney is a walrus with odd teeth. He owns a magic shop.
- Clara is a goat who plays the music with a zither to the termites. She meets Alfred, Camille, Milo and Cynthia and gives them radish juice and summer squash cookies.
- Mrs. Coleen Radley is a chipmunk who lives in a mansion. She looks like a squirrel due to her longer tail and she loves to sing opera. Her high "C"s were known to shatter crystal from the yards away from her house.
- Polly Porcupine is one of the citizens of Gnarly Woods. She wears a yellow t-shirt with eyeglasses, a long purple skirt and orange sandals. She enjoys serving food and is shown to have a vegetable patch at her house. She opened a cabana at the beach and fixed sandwiches for people stuck to rocks. She grew an award-winning pumpkin.
- Razzy is a weasel and a traveling stage and television personality. His adventures in Gnarly Woods included emceeing a school magic show and mysteriously getting drenched with water. He speaks with a French accent and is one of the celebrities who Cynthia and her cousins idolize.
- Mr. Remy is a mole and one of the supporting characters in the series. He has a background in music and history and sometimes, he helps out with investigations.
- Edgar Remy is Mr. Remy's son. He sometimes helps with mysteries by giving Alfred and his friends clues in the form of picture.
- Ricardo Rabbit (voiced by Tod Fennell) is the one and only celebrity who resides in Gnarly Woods. Despite his name, he is not a rabbit, but a hare (specifically a snowshoe hare). He is mentioned recording an album called Ricardo at His Home. When a statue of him is revealed, he complains that it is not him because his face on the statue looks like that he is yelling. He likes to run in races and perform in stage plays.
- Tom is a bobcat who wears a red shirt.

== Settings ==
- Hedgequarters: A place where Alfred, Camille and Milo study the clues that they have found. It includes a swing, a hammock and a rope which is tied in knots. It has the equipment needed to solve their mysteries, like a chemical lab, several computers where they download all three clues that they gathered during investigations and use the computer in order to research the answer to their mystery. Also, it contains a collection of many mystery novels that they order for in a catalogue and also use these books as references in their mysteries like The Mystery Totem Series. It was involved in a mystery when an old tree that rests above it called the roots of Old Fingerbone would dig into the base and it would cause everything to tilt and slant off balance. In the end of the mystery, Alfred mentioned he would ask Rudder to help remove the roots of that tree.
- The Tower of Ziplines: A high tower that overlooks Gnarly Woods and also, is connected to a system of ziplines which the gang uses to get around Gnarly Woods when they need to get to a location very quickly. The ziplines carry 4 people when Lily joins the main trio.
- The House of the Hedgehog Family: It is known as the house of the family of Alfred and Lily too. This house has the bedroom of Alfred where he sometimes studies with his laptop. There is also a beehive at the corner of the house where the father of Alfred who is a beekeeper uses to raise his honey bees.
- Camille's House: Camille's bedroom is shown.
- Milo's House: Milo's bedroom is shown.
- Gnarly Woods Academy: The school that Mr. Russard and the kids attend. It has a chalkboard on the wall.
- The House of the Payne Family: It is also known as the house of Cynthia's family. It is painted pink and it has a garden. It also resembles a treehouse.
- The Tree of JJ Raccoon: A tree decorated with shiny items that are owned by JJ Raccoon. It has a ladder in the front.
- The Tree of Chloe Owl: A tree where Chloe lives. The old one is taken down by Oakley the beaver.
- The Den of Winston: A place where Winston sleeps.
- The Den of Victor: A place where Victor Vole lives. It has a portrait of his grandfather.
- The Dam of Oakley Beaver: A place where Oakley lives. It was destroyed by rushing water with salmon.
- The Mansion of Boo Radley: Mrs. Radley's house located on Mayberry Hill and isolated from other houses, it has jack-o-lantern mushrooms surrounding the mansion.
- Ricardo's House: A place where Ricardo Rabbit works as a star.
- Mr. Russard's House: It is where Mr. Russard lives.
- The Amphitheater: An outdoor stage in Gnarly Woods.
- Gnarly Woods Lake: The location of several mysteries.
- Black Forest Elementary School: The rival school of Gnarly Woods Academy that they usually compete against in several events but are not been seen at all in the series, they have been mostly referred to in several occasions in the show when the school is competing against them. Mr. Hedgehog had mentioned once that he was a student of Black Forest.
- Turtle Pond: The home of Lugubrious the turtle.

== Episodes ==
| No. | Title | Solved mysteries | First aired |
|---|---|---|---|
| 1 | "The Forest Attacks! / Sleepless Night" | Gorse seeds popping / Oakley the beaver | January 9, 2010 |
| 2 | "The Eyes of a Thief / Stranger Among Us" | Jonathan "J.J." Raccoon / Ricardo the snowshoe hare changing color by season | January 16, 2010 |
| 3 | "The Phantom Footprints / Casting Call" | Withers the Bear hibernating / Mockingbirds | January 13, 2010 |
| 4 | "The Glowing Eyes / The "No Treasure" Treasure Hunt" | Fireflies / Sunflowers | January 14, 2010 |
| 5 | "A Flash of Silver / Buggy Summer" | Salmon / Landslide blocking bats | January 19, 2010 |
| 6 | "The Case of the Space Invader / The Fur-growing Tree" | Mr. Hedgehog in a beekeeper uniform / Moose fur | January 21, 2010 |
| 7 | "The Mystery of Old Gnarly / Trouble at Turtle Pond" | Halite / Turtles caused by bottled water | January 20, 2010 |
| 8 | "Who Knocked Out Grizz? / The Mysterious Vandal" | Asian carp / Termites | January 27, 2010 |
| 9 | "Cabana Drama / The Great Flower Mystery" | Platypus / Low acidic levels caused by limestone | January 28, 2010 |
| 10 | "Boo Radley's House / The Case of the Invisible Visitor" | Jack-o-lantern mushrooms / Chameleons | February 2, 2010 |
| 11 | "The Mysterious Red Spots / The Mystery of the Big Stink" | Pine processionary caterpillars / Valerians with cats | February 3, 2010 |
| 12 | "The Ghastly Ghost Beetles / A Three Star Mystery" | Cicadas / Cold water geysers | February 4, 2010 |
| 13 | "The Baffling Bubbles Mystery / It's Raining Fish" | Saponin berries / Waterspouts | February 9, 2010 |
| 14 | "The Mysterious Fog / The Maple Syrup Mystery" | Grey herons / Yellow-bellied sapsuckers | February 10, 2010 |
| 15 | "The Malfunctioning Magical Beans / The Mystery of the Heavy Feet" | Mexican jumping beans / Magnetite | February 11, 2010 |
| 16 | "The Mysterious Fern / The Go-kart Mystery" | Resurrection ferns curling / Common cuckoos | February 16, 2010 |
| 17 | "The Mysterious Snow Rolls / The Mysterious Itch" | Wind making snow rolls / Rose hips producing itching powder | February 17, 2010 |
| 18 | "The Night of Stars / Old Fingerbone's Revenge!" | Fallen meteorites / Tree roots | February 23, 2010 |
| 19 | "The Blue Mystery / Bubble Trouble" | Woad Leaves in blue water / Volcanoes | February 18, 2010 |
| 20 | "The Mysterious Falling Forest! / The Magician's Wand" | Bark beetles / Ball lightning | March 23, 2010 |
| 21 | "The Mystery of Ricardo's Missing Head / Who, What, Where, When, and How?" | Silt clay soil / Solar panels | March 24, 2010 |
| 22 | "The Mysterious Gold Rush / The Mystery of the 99 Fish" | Pyrite / Tadpoles transforming to frogs | March 30, 2010 |
| 23 | "False Notes in Gnarly Woods / The Artful Art Thief!" | Porcupines / Magpies | March 25, 2010 |
| 24 | "The Case of the Disappearing Painting / The Spirited Pearls" | Honey on paper / Gecko eggs | June 12, 2010 |
| 25 | "The Haunting Sound / The Marsh Mystery" | Mrs. Radley singing in vocal ranges / Preserved artifacts | March 31, 2010 |
| 26 | "The Mysterious Sneeze / Long Lives the Queen!" | Hay fever and pollen / Pink box of snow drops with honey bees | June 19, 2010 |
