= List of Kuu Kuu Harajuku episodes =

Kuu Kuu Harajuku (originally titled KooKoo Harajuku) is an animated children's television series created by Gwen Stefani for Network Ten, based on her Harajuku Lovers brand. The series debuted on Eleven in Australia on 1 November 2015.

== Series overview ==
Series	Segments	Episodes	Originally released	
Series	Segments	Episodes	First released	Last released
1	52	26	1 November 2015	13 August 2016
2	52	26	1 July 2017	23 December 2017
3	52	26	11 August 2018	28 December 2019

== Episodes ==
=== Season 1 (2015–16) ===
No.	Title	Directed by	Written by	Storyboard by	Australian air date	U.S. air date	US viewers (millions)
1a	"Totally Teen Genie"	Gillian Carr	Tim Bain	Rod Amador	1 November 2015	3 October 2016	1.09
Angel uses a teen genie's three wishes to help HJ5 win a trophy from the Totally Teen Awards show.
1b	"Angel's Flight"	Gillian Carr	Rhonda Smiley and James Hereth	Leisl Adams	1 November 2015	3 October 2016	1.09
When an unflattering picture of Angel is posted online, she's determined to restore her reputation.
2a	"Music Baby"	Gillian Carr	Madellaine Paxson	Mike Geiger	8 November 2015	4 October 2016	1.00
The girls have been booked in an underground club in Newfunland.
2b	"Wanted Audience"	Gillian Carr	Brendan Luno	Michelle Ku	8 November 2015	4 October 2016	1.00
HJ5's audience is missing from their gig.
3a	"Game Over"	Gillian Carr	Tania Lacy	Jeff White	8 November 2015	5 October 2016	1.03
Say Wah sucks the band into a computer game.
3b	"Phony Ponies"	Gillian Carr	Tim Bain	Mike Geiger	8 November 2015	5 October 2016	1.03
Baby and her pet unicorn compete in the Pony-Corn Cup.
4a	"Hello Puppy"	Gillian Carr	Elizabeth Keyishian	Jeff White and Mike Geiger	15 November 2015	6 October 2016	0.91
G is given a puppy, Chewie.
4b	"G, This Is Awfully Deep"	Gillian Carr	Rhonda Smiley and James Hereth	José Pou	15 November 2015	6 October 2016	0.91
HJ5's stage drops into a sinkhole.
5a	"Baby's Birthday"	Gillian Carr	Ann Austen and Obie Scott Wade	Jeff White	29 November 2015	7 October 2016	0.87
Baby opens up her birthday present before its ready and releases one of Love's inventions.
5b	"Labor of Love"	Gillian Carr	Rhonda Smiley and James Hereth	Michelle Ku	29 November 2015	7 October 2016	0.87
A computer virus Sparkski is unleashed on HJ5's headquarters.
6a	"Bad Boy and Little Girl"	Gillian Carr	Madellaine Paxson	Mike Geiger	6 December 2015	8 October 2016	0.82
Baby gets stuck in the cockpit of Harajuku's Mecha Robot.
6b	"Yummy Bear Nado"	Gillian Carr	Adam Long and Steve Aranguren	Leisl Adams	6 December 2015	8 October 2016	0.82
Love befriends a Monster Pet who upgrades her latest weather invention.
7a	"Drums of Doom"	Gillian Carr	Becky Overton	Michelle Ku	TBA	15 October 2016	0.84
When Angel forgets to practice drumming, the magical drums fight back.
7b	"Adventures in Housesitting"	Gillian Carr	Eddie Guzelian	Mike Geiger	TBA	15 October 2016	0.84
Rudie gets HJ5 an audition with Twisty T, a music producer.
8a	"The Kawaiifier"	Gillian Carr	Sue Rose	Liesl Adams	20 December 2015	22 October 2016	0.82
Love reveals the Kawaiifier for the Kawaii-fication Festival.
8b	"Super Kawaii Sunday"	Gillian Carr	Mirith J. Colao	Allan Jeffery	20 December 2015	22 October 2016	0.82
A photographer's camera for a cover magazine contest goes wrong due to an overload on kawaii.
9a	"Delectabubbles"	Gillian Carr	Elizabeth Keyishan	Mike Geiger	TBA	29 October 2016	0.76
The band play at Bubble Land.
9b	"Kablooey Chewie"	Gillian Carr	Brendan Luno	José Pou	TBA	29 October 2016	0.76
Chewie is launched into space and clones himself inside the rocket.
10a	"Water Baby"	Gillian Carr	Brendan Luno	Michelle Ku	TBA	5 November 2016 (Note: This episode first aired on 1 November 2016 in Poland.)	0.65
A group of Octacorns crack the dome ceiling during HJ5's gig.
10b	"Music Zoo"	Gillian Carr	Steve Aranguren (story); Ann Austen and Obie Scott Wade	Jeff Amey and Jamie LeClaire	TBA	5 November 2016	0.65
Music becomes her alter-ego Muzaka, but the girls need to get the real Music back when their concert at the zoo is ruined.
11a	"The Dotted Line"	Gillian Carr	Eddie Guzelian	José Pou	TBA	12 November 2016 (Note: This episode first aired on 4 November 2016 in Poland.)	0.73
HJ5 is offered a record contract only if they change everything about themselves.
11b	"Life Is but a Dream"	Gillian Carr	Adam Long and Steve Aranguren	Jennifer Myers	TBA	12 November 2016	0.73
Love invents a machine that lets the girls share a dream concert to help G with her case of stage fright.
12a	"Oh, G"	Gillian Carr	Rhonda Smiley and James Hereth	Leisl Adams	7 May 2016	19 November 2016	1.18
A painting by Pigment comes to life and roams the city.
12b	"Greenhouse" "Green House"	Gillian Carr	Eddie Guzelian	Leisl Adams	7 May 2016	19 November 2016	1.18
Rudie forgets to tell HJ5 that he promised Twisty T the girls will take care of his prize rose garden.
13a	"Control + Alt + Dimension" "Control Plus Alt Plus Dimension"	Gillian Carr	Eddie Guzelian	Michelle Ku	TBA	4 February 2017 (Note: This episode first aired on 22 November 2016 in Canada.)	0.71
Love invents a gizmo that sends her to another dimension.
13b	"Angel Hair"	Gillian Carr	Madellaine Paxson (story); Ann Austen and Obie Scott Wade	Mike Geiger	TBA	4 February 2017	0.71
Rudie gives Angel a makeover.
14a	"Inside Job"	Gillian Carr	Brendan Luno	Mike Geiger	TBA	11 February 2017 (Note: This episode first aired on 23 November 2016 in Canada.)	TBD
Rudie accidentally shrinks the girls and a Monster Pet eats them.
14b	"Sea Monkeying Around"	Gillian Carr	Brendan Luno	José Pou and Leisl Adams	TBA	11 February 2017	TBD
Another one of Rudie's promotions go wrong at the Lo Lo Sea Mall.
15a	"Trust Your Inner Uniphant"	Gillian Carr	Elizabeth Keyishan	Jeff White	TBA	25 February 2017 (Note: This episode first aired on 28 November 2016 in Canada.)	TBD
Rudie tells Zookeeper Smythe that the girls are experts in handling the Uniphants.
15b	"Starr Power"	Gillian Carr	Kevin Nemeth	Michelle Ku	TBA	25 February 2017	TBD
Sammy Starr signs HJ5.
16a	"Zero G"	Gillian Carr	Madellaine Paxson	Jamie LeClaire and José Pou	TBA	4 March 2017 (Note: This episode first aired on 24 October 2016 in Poland.)	TBD
Aliens are insulted by an HJ5 song and interrupt their concert.
16b	"Angel Food"	Gillian Carr	Steve Aranguren	Jamie LeClaire and José Pou	TBA	4 March 2017	TBD
A hoard of hungry Monster Pets mistake HJ5 for their next meal when the band dress in food costumes for their gig.
17a	"Happy Slam"	Gillian Carr	Steve Aranguren and Adam Long	Jeff White	11 June 2016	7 April 2017 (Note: This episode first aired on 31 October 2016 in Poland.)	N/A
Rudie borrows one of Love's discarded experiments, the Movement Enhancer.
17b	"Retro Fiasco"	Gillian Carr	Tim Bain	José Pou	11 June 2016	7 April 2017	N/A
A shop full of retro clothing takes over the mall.
18a	"HJ10"	Gillian Carr	Brendan Luno	Mike Geiger	TBA	14 April 2017 (Note: This episode first aired on 2 November 2016 in Poland.)	TBD
Alien shape-shifters who look like HJ5 arrive in Harajuku for their upcoming invasion.
18b	"Waves of Love"	Gillian Carr	Tania Lacy and Steve Aranguren	Leisl Adams	TBA	14 April 2017	TBD
Love has to choose between staying with the band and taking a job at Harajuku University.
19a	"Sand and Deliver"	Gillian Carr	Brendan Luno	Rod Amador	TBA	21 April 2017 (Note: This episode first aired on 6 December 2016 in Canada.)	TBD
A lightning strike brings the sand bunnies at the Harajuku Sand Sculpture competition to life.
19b	"Moods Meow"	Gillian Carr	Mirith Colao	José Pou	TBA	21 April 2017	TBD
HJ5 must rescue Moods Meow the grumpy cat before their gig is cancelled.
20a	"Yeti in the House"	Gillian Carr	Sue Rose	Michelle Ku	TBA	28 April 2017 (Note: This episode first aired on 8 November 2016 in Poland.)	TBD
HJ5 help a misunderstood yeti make it back home.
20b	"The Young and the Reckless" "The Young and Reckless"	Gillian Carr	Tim Bain	Jeff White	TBA	28 April 2017	TBD
Stegosaurus Stan changes everyone in the Harajuku Retirement Home into children to win back glory.
21a	"Brodie on Board"	Gillian Carr	Tim Bain	Michelle Ku	9 July 2016	5 May 2017 (Note: This episode first aired on 12 December 2016 in Canada and Poland.)	N/A
HJ5 hires Rudie's young cousin Brodie as an intern.
21b	"Womzilla"	Gillian Carr	Kevin Nemeth	Jeff White	9 July 2016	5 May 2017	N/A
Rudie accidentally unleashes a great wombat on Harajuku when trying to make a film.
22a	"Emotizoms"	Gillian Carr	Tim Bain	Liesl Adams	TBA	12 May 2017 (Note: This episode first aired on 13 December 2016 in Canada.)	TBD
Rudie brings a box of emoticuddles to the wedding of the year.
22b	"The Big Time"	Gillian Carr	Rhonda Smiley and James Hereth	Mike Geiger	TBA	12 May 2017	TBD
Baby's interactive Queueby doll becomes big when he runs into an experimental fertilizer.
23a	"Un-Bear-able"	Gillian Carr	James Bates	José Pou	TBA	19 May 2017 (Note: This episode first aired on 9 December 2016 in Poland.)	TBD
Rudie uses a new toy bear that says uncomfortable things to apologize to Angel for hurting her feelings.
23b	"Snowy The Frostman"	Gillian Carr	Adam Long and Steve Aranguren	Michelle Ku	TBA	19 May 2017	TBD
The Sporty Sports Fun Mascot tries to destroy Rudie.
24a	"Kawaii Cake Mix Up"	Gillian Carr	Becky Overton	Michelle Ku	TBA	2 June 2017 (Note: This episode first aired on 12 December 2016 in Poland.)	TBD
The girls shrink themselves onto the top of a cupcake to search for a micro-sized USB key that contains their latest song.
24b	"Angel Fever"	Gillian Carr	Steve Aranguren and Adam Long	Neil Hunter	TBA	2 June 2017	TBD
The city of Harajuku falls under the spell of Angel's new shoes.
25a	"Candy Blossom Flower Festival"	Gillian Carr	Mirith J. Colao	Michelle Ku	TBA	9 June 2017 (Note: This episode first aired on 20 December 2016 in Poland.)	TBD
Shu Shu the Silver Shimmer Squirrel transfers some of his powers onto Music when he gives her a kiss on the forehead.
25b	"Princess Power"	Gillian Carr	Brendan Luno	Leisl Adams	TBA	9 June 2017	TBD
Rudie accidentally causes a mechanical dragon stage prop to go berserk at one of the girls gigs.
26a	"Hark! A Quarkle!"	Gillian Carr	Ray Boseley	Michelle Ku and Leisl Adams	13 August 2016	16 June 2017 (Note: This episode first aired on 21 December 2016 in Poland.)	N/A
Love accidentally creates the Quarkle, an energy organism, and the girls have to track it down before it runs Jo Jo Julie's new fashion launch.
26b	"The Ends of the Earth"	Gillian Carr	Eddie Guzelian	Drew Edwards	13 August 2016	16 June 2017	N/A
G and the gang use Love's time machine to keep returning to the past until they find a way to play their gig without ending the world.

=== Season 2 (2017) ===
No. overall	No. in season	Title	Directed by	Written by	Storyboard by	Australian air date	U.S. air date	US viewers (millions)
27a	1a	"Training Day"	Gillian Carr	Steve Aranguren and Adam Long	Pat Ventura	1 July 2017	7 July 2017	N/A
HJ5 tries to catch a train they missed while performing a concert for the passengers.
27b	1b	"Multi Tasking"	Gillian Carr	Eddie Guzelian	TBA	1 July 2017	7 July 2017	N/A
Rudie books the girls for two concerts at the same time and they try to multitask between the two.
28a	2a	"Hot Rod"	Gillian Carr	James W. Bates	Ian Freedman	8 July 2017	14 July 2017	N/A
Love gives R.O.D. an upgrade that makes all the electrical machines in town adore him.
28b	2b	"Over and Out"	Gillian Carr	Kevin Nemeth	TBA	8 July 2017	14 July 2017	N/A
The girls want to prank gossip-monger Krispin Krouton by making Baby look like a bad girl with The Reversilator but she ends up being bad for real and wants to leave HJ5.
29a	3a	"Stage Magic"	Gillian Carr	Ray Boseley	Kervin Faria	15 July 2017	21 July 2017	N/A
Rudie tries to incorporate magic tricks into HJ5's performance.
29b	3b	"The Sixth Wheel"	Gillian Carr	Ray Boseley	TBA	15 July 2017	21 July 2017	N/A
Rudie pretends to be the leader of HJ5 to impress his visiting grandmother.
30a	4a	"Trash Talk"	Gillian Carr	Tim Bain	TBA	22 July 2017	28 July 2017	N/A
Krispin Krouton spreads horrible false rumors about HJ5 on his vlog and the band tries to stop him.
30b	4b	"iTeeth"	Gillian Carr	Ray Boseley	TBA	22 July 2017	28 July 2017	N/A
After Baby eats super sticky Goo Chew candy, her retainer begins picking up radio waves making her unable to sing at an audition.
31a	5a	"Spies Like Spyke"	Gillian Carr	Tim Bain	Pat Ventura	29 July 2017	4 August 2017	0.49
The girls become spies and help Colonel Spyke catch a villain at Jo Jo Jolie's winter ball.
31b	5b	"The Fabulous Baron Von Melody"	Gillian Carr	Eddie Guzelian	TBA	29 July 2017	4 August 2017	0.49
HJ5 chooses performer Baron Von Melody as their opening act but soon find out he has a double identity.
32a	6a	"Game Show Offs"	Gillian Carr	James W. Bates	Kervin Faria	5 August 2017	11 August 2017	0.44
The girls and Rudie are contestants and are pitted against each other on a game show.
32b	6b	"Monster Mash"	Gillian Carr	Brendan Luno (story); Steve Aranguren	Ian Freedman	5 August 2017	11 August 2017	0.44
The girls minds get swapped with five monster pets right before an important concert with Twisty T.
33a	7a	"You Are What You Eat"	Gillian Carr	Brendan Luno (story); Madellaine Paxson	TBA	12 August 2017	18 August 2017	0.45
Eating snacks from a vending machine give the girls strange new abilities.
33b	7b	"Supersonic HJ5"	Gillian Carr	Tania Lacy	TBA	12 August 2017	18 August 2017	0.45
HJ5 try to stop Say-Wah from bombing their band photos by moving at supersonic speed but find out she has bigger intentions.
34a	8a	"Tizzie Lizzie"	Gillian Carr	Sue Rose	TBA	19 August 2017	25 August 2017	0.41
HJ5 performs at the house of their biggest fan, Tizzie Lizzie, who doesn't want them to leave.
34b	8b	"Caught in the Web"	Gillian Carr	Rhonda Smiley and James Hereth	TBA	19 August 2017	25 August 2017	0.41
HJ5 are literally caught in the web due to a computer malfunction.
35a	9a	"57 Channels (and Nothin' On)"	Gillian Carr	Eddie Guzelian	TBA	26 August 2017	8 September 2017	N/A
HJ5 and Rudie get trapped in the broadcast network and must make their way through different channels to get to their live TV performance on time.
35b	9b	"Gettin' Kinda Late With Mauve Madison"	Gillian Carr	James W. Bates	TBA	26 August 2017	8 September 2017	N/A
Rudie takes over hosting Mauve Madison's talk show.
36a	10a	"Ladybug Power"	Gillian Carr	Sue Rose	TBA	2 September 2017	15 September 2017	0.54
Rudie uses up all of the electricity for the girls' benefit concert with his virtual reality game.
36b	10b	"Wrestle Pop"	Gillian Carr	Kevin Nemeth	TBA	2 September 2017	15 September 2017	0.54
HJ5 is booked to play at Music's wrestling match.
37a	11a	"Angel Changel"	Gillian Carr	Ray Boseley	TBA	9 September 2017	22 September 2017	0.36
Angel tries to quit the band.
37b	11b	"Coulda Been"	Gillian Carr	Rhonda Smiley and James Hereth	TBA	9 September 2017	22 September 2017	0.36
Rudie accidentally traps himself in an alternate reality after using one of Love's unfinished inventions.
38a	12a	"Catnapped"	Gillian Carr	Anthony Watt	TBA	16 September 2017	29 September 2017	N/A
General No-Fun's cat, Moods Meow, becomes intelligent and tries to take over the world.
38b	12b	"Roundabout Roundup"	Gillian Carr	James Hereth and Rhonda Smiley	TBA	16 September 2017	29 September 2017	N/A
Rudie books the band at Howdyjuku Theme Park for the weekend.
39a	13a	"Meerkatz"	Gillian Carr	Tim Bain	TBA	23 September 2017	6 October 2017	0.36
Sammy Starr brings all the villains of Harajuku together for an evil plan. Angel goes undercover to stop them but gets swept up with being in the spotlight.
39b	13b	"Pandamonium"	Gillian Carr	Kevin Nemeth	TBA	23 September 2017	6 October 2017	0.36
A panda-obsessed toy maker wants to make the whole world Kawaii using Baby's cuteness.
40a	14a	"Kawaii Fidelity"	Gillian Carr	Ray Boseley	TBA	30 September 2017	13 October 2017	0.44
The girls discover that their new song turns whoever listens to it into kawaii monster pets.
40b	14b	"Rocky Road"	Gillian Carr	Rhonda Smiley and James Hereth	TBA	30 September 2017	13 October 2017	0.44
41a	15a	"This Place is a Zoo"	Gillian Carr	Brendan Luno	Ian Freedman	7 October 2017	20 October 2017	N/A
41b	15b	"Wacky Wednesday"	Gillian Carr	Sue Rose	Kervin Faria	7 October 2017	20 October 2017	N/A
42a	16a	"Dream Escape"	Gillian Carr	Holly Lyons	TBA	14 October 2017	3 November 2017	N/A
Creatures from Baby's dream escape into the real world and cause trouble for HJ5.
42b	16b	"The Kimberlys"	Gillian Carr	Eddie Guzelian	Pat Ventura	14 October 2017	3 November 2017	N/A
Rudie starts managing a new band, The Kimberlys, who are determined to replace HJ5.
43a	17a	"Cecil G. DeMille"	Gillian Carr	James W. Bates	Kervin Faria	21 October 2017	10 November 2017	N/A
43b	17b	"Sky High Kawaii"	Gillian Carr	Steve Aranguren and Adam Long	TBA	21 October 2017	10 November 2017	N/A
44a	18a	"And the Winner Is..."	Gillian Carr	Tania Lacy	Ian Freedman	28 October 2017	17 November 2017	N/A
44b	18b	"The Trouble with Trilbys"	Gillian Carr	Ray Boseley	TBA	28 October 2017	17 November 2017	N/A
45a	19a	"Who Are You Calling Cupid?"	Gillian Carr	Tim Bain	TBA	4 November 2017	24 November 2017	N/A
45b	19b	"Beach"	Gillian Carr	Kevin Nemeth	TBA	4 November 2017	24 November 2017	N/A
46a	20a	"Maxi-Mini Golf"	Gillian Carr	Eddie Guzelian	TBA	11 November 2017	TBA	N/A
46b	20b	"White Glitter Glider"	Gillian Carr	Steve Aranguren and Adam Long	TBA	11 November 2017	TBA	N/A
47a	21a	"The Fantabulous Five"	Gillian Carr	Tim Bain	Pat Ventura	18 November 2017	TBA	N/A
47b	21b	"Mist-ery Guest"	Gillian Carr	Rhonda Smiley & James Hereth	Kervin Faria	18 November 2017	TBA	N/A
48a	22a	"An Imaginary Friend in Need"	Gillian Carr	Ray Boseley	Ian Freedman	25 November 2017	TBA	N/A
48b	22b	"Snowbound for Greatness"	Gillian Carr	Rhonda Smiley & James Hereth	Guy Vasilovich	25 November 2017	TBA	N/A
49a	23a	"The Gnome Ultimatum"	Gillian Carr	Tim Bain	TBA	2 December 2017	TBA	N/A
49b	23b	"G Force"	Gillian Carr	Steve Aranguren	Pat Ventura	2 December 2017	TBA	N/A
50a	24a	"KuuKuuBall Run"	Gillian Carr	Kevin Nemeth	Ian Freedman	9 December 2017	TBA	N/A
50b	24b	"Feline's Finest"	Gillian Carr	Eddie Guzelian	Kervin Faria	9 December 2017	TBA	N/A
51a	25a	"Debut Album"	Gillian Carr	Madellaine Paxson	Guy Vasilovich	16 December 2017	TBA	N/A
51b	25b	"Love's Lamentations"	Gillian Carr	Mirth Colao	TBA	16 December 2017	TBA	N/A
52a	26a	"Studio No-No"	Gillian Carr	Ray Boseley	Guy Vasilovich	23 December 2017	TBA	N/A
52b	26b	"The Gig Is Up"	Gillian Carr	Brendan Luno	Pat Ventura	23 December 2017	TBA	N/A

=== Season 3 (2018–19) ===
No. overall	No. in season	Title	Directed by	Written by	Storyboards by	Australian air date	U.S. air date	Viewers (millions)
53a	1a	"Kawaii to the World Tour"	Gillian Carr	Steve Aranguren	TBA	11 August 2018	10 August 2018	N/A
53b	1b	"Mind Games"	Gillian Carr	Eddie Guzelian (story); Madellaine Paxson	TBA	11 August 2018	10 August 2018	N/A
54a	2a	"Bye Bye Baby"	Gillian Carr	Brendan Luno	TBA	18 August 2018	17 August 2018	N/A
54b	2b	"Super Awesome Galacto Rudie"	Gillian Carr	Ray Boseley	TBA	18 August 2018	17 August 2018	N/A
55a	3a	"Family Affair"	Gillian Carr	Eddie Guzelian (story); Steve Aranguren	TBA	25 August 2018	24 August 2018	N/A
55b	3b	"It's All About Mimi, Me"	Gillian Carr	Amy Shindler & Beth Chalmers	TBA	25 August 2018	24 August 2018	N/A
56a	4a	"Monkey Business"	Gillian Carr	Kevin Nemeth	TBA	1 September 2018	31 August 2018	N/A
56b	4b	"Southern Sparkles"	Gillian Carr	Amy Shindler & Beth Chalmers	TBA	1 September 2018	31 August 2018	N/A
57a	5a	"Monster Pets on the Bus"	Gillian Carr	Steve Aranguren & Adam Long	TBA	8 September 2018	7 September 2018	N/A
57b	5b	"Kawaii-Saurs"	Gillian Carr	Tim Bain	TBA	8 September 2018	7 September 2018	N/A
58a	6a	"Oh, Boya!"	Gillian Carr	Mirith Colao	TBA	15 September 2018	14 September 2018	N/A
58b	6b	"Rudie's Law"	Gillian Carr	Rhonda Smiley & James Hereth	TBA	15 September 2018	14 September 2018	N/A
59a	7a	"The High C"	Gillian Carr	Brendan Luno	TBA	22 September 2018	21 September 2018	N/A
59b	7b	"Aller-G"	Gillian Carr	Ray Boseley	TBA	22 September 2018	21 September 2018	N/A
60a	8a	"Groovy Beach Goes Bonkers"	Gillian Carr	David Witt	TBA	29 September 2018	28 September 2018	N/A
60b	8b	"Smart Phone"	Gillian Carr	Eddie Guzelian	TBA	29 September 2018	28 September 2018	N/A
61a	9a	"Hotel Kawaii-fornia"	Gillian Carr	Amy Shindler & Beth Chalmers	TBA	6 October 2018	5 October 2018	N/A
61b	9b	"Boo Boo Harajuku"	Gillian Carr	Doug Sinclair	TBA	6 October 2018	5 October 2018	N/A
62a	10a	"Future Tense"	Gillian Carr	Ray Boseley	TBA	13 October 2018	12 October 2018	N/A
62b	10b	"Pamperlona"	Gillian Carr	Dan Mansour	TBA	13 October 2018	12 October 2018	N/A
63a	11a	"My Way or the Kawaii Way"	Gillian Carr	Steve Aranguren & Adam Long	TBA	20 October 2018	TBA	N/A
63b	11b	"Tinselfest"	Gillian Carr	Kevin Nemeth	TBA	20 October 2018	TBA	N/A
64a	12a	"Planet of the Rudies"	Gillian Carr	Tim Bain	TBA	27 October 2018	TBA	N/A
64b	12b	"Fan Fun Day"	Gillian Carr	Brendan Luno	TBA	27 October 2018	TBA	N/A
65a	13a	"Happy 100th"	Gillian Carr	Lorin Clarke	TBA	3 November 2018	TBA	N/A
65b	13b	"The Sweet Life"	Gillian Carr	Tim Bain	TBA	3 November 2018	TBA	N/A
66a	14a	"Must the Show Go On?"	Gillian Carr	Rhonda Smiley & James Hereth	TBA	10 November 2018	TBA	N/A
66b	14b	"Lights! Camera! HJ5!"	Gillian Carr	Kevin Nemeth	TBA	10 November 2018	TBA	N/A
67a	15a	"Marshmallow Madness"	Gillian Carr	Amy Shindler & Beth Chalmers	TBA	17 November 2018	TBA	N/A
67b	15b	"Social Media"	Gillian Carr	Eddie Guzelian	TBA	17 November 2018	TBA	N/A
68a	16a	"That's So Five Minutes Ago"	Gillian Carr	Ken Pontac & Warren Graff	TBA	24 November 2018	TBA	N/A
68b	16b	"Messy Magic"	Gillian Carr	Mirith Colao	TBA	24 November 2018	TBA	N/A
69a	17a	"Lather, Rinse, Repeat"	Gillian Carr	Adam Long & Steve Aranguren	TBA	1 December 2018	TBA	N/A
69b	17b	"Sing Thing"	Gillian Carr	Brendan Luno	TBA	1 December 2018	TBA	N/A
70a	18a	"Baby Rudie"	Gillian Carr	Rhonda Smiley & James Hereth	TBA	8 December 2018	TBA	N/A
70b	18b	"Rock Your Socks"	Gillian Carr	Adam Long & Steve Aranguren	TBA	8 December 2018	TBA	N/A
71a	19a	"What's in a Name?"	Gillian Carr	Mirith Colao	TBA	15 December 2018	TBA	N/A
71b	19b	"Joy Ride"	Gillian Carr	Doug Sinclair	TBA	15 December 2018	TBA	N/A
72a	20a	"The Fabulous Baron Von Rudie"	Gillian Carr	Holly Lyons (story); Madellaine Paxson	TBA	22 December 2018	TBA	N/A
72b	20b	"Mappy Birthday Music"	Gillian Carr	Ray Boseley	TBA	22 December 2018	TBA	N/A
73a	21a	"Hologrammed"	Gillian Carr	David Witt	TBA	29 December 2018	TBA	N/A
73b	21b	"Good Old Rod"	Gillian Carr	Ken Pontac & Warren Graff	TBA	29 December 2018	TBA	N/A
74a	22a	"Teen Genie Strikes Back"	Gillian Carr	Ray Boseley (story); Kevin Nemeth	TBA	14 December 2019 (Note: This episode first aired on 5 November 2019 on Disney Channel Australia.)	TBA	N/A
74b	22b	"Clueless in Sweetropolis"	Gillian Carr	Tim Bain	TBA	14 December 2019	TBA	N/A
75a	23a	"Rumour Has It"	Gillian Carr	Danielle Koenig	TBA	15 December 2019 (Note: This episode first aired on 6 November 2019 on Disney Channel Australia.)	TBA	N/A
75b	23b	"The Princess and the Rocker"	Gillian Carr	Eddie Guzelian	TBA	15 December 2019	TBA	N/A
76a	24a	"G-Whizz"	Gillian Carr	Dan Mansour	TBA	21 December 2019 (Note: This episode first aired on 7 November 2019 on Disney Channel Australia.)	TBA	N/A
76b	24b	"Mind Over Manager"	Gillian Carr	Ray Boseley	TBA	21 December 2019	TBA	N/A
77a	25a	"Razzle Dazzle"	Gillian Carr	Andy Watts (story); Steve Aranguren	TBA	22 December 2019 (Note: This episode first aired on 8 November 2019 on Disney Channel Australia.)	TBA	N/A
77b	25b	"Project Runaway"	Gillian Carr	Tim Bain	TBA	22 December 2019	TBA	N/A
78a	26a	"Run to the Sun"	Gillian Carr	Kevin Nemeth	TBA	28 December 2019 (Note: This episode first aired on 11 November 2019 on Disney Channel Australia.)	TBA	N/A
78b	26b	"That Sinking Feeling"	Gillian Carr	Brendan Luno	TBA	28 December 2019	TBA	N/A
