= Kuu Kuu Harajuku =

Children's animated television series

- The show's logo, and featuring the characters left to right clockwise: Love, Angel, G, Music, Baby and Rudie.
- Also known as: KooKoo Harajuku
- Genre: Comedy; Action; Animated series
- Created by: Gwen Stefani
- Based on: Harajuku Lovers brand by Gwen Stefani
- Developed by: Steve Aranguren; Gillian Carr; Madellaine Paxson
- Showrunner: Gwen Stefani
- Directed by: Gillian Carr
- Voices of: Maggie Chretien; Daisy Masterman; Emma Taylor-Isherwood; Sally Taylor-Isherwood; Charlotte Nicdao; Danny Smith
- Theme music composer: Christopher Elves
- Opening theme: Performed by Gwen Stefani
- Composers: Christopher Elves; Mark McDuff; Keith C. Moore (seasons 2–3)
- Countries of origin: United States; Canada; Malaysia; Australia
- Original language: English
- No. of seasons: 3
- No. of episodes: 78 (156 segments) (list of episodes)

Production
- Executive producers: Gillian Carr; Low Huoi Seong; Gwen Stefani; Frank Taylor (season 1)
- Producers: Gillian Carr; Shelley Dresden (season 2)
- Editor: Sean Morrison (season 2)
- Running time: 23 minutes (12 minutes per segment)
- Production companies: Vision Animation; Moody Street Kids; Red Flags Fly

Original release
- Network: 10 Peach (Australia)
- Release: 1 November 2015 – 28 December 2019

Kuu Kuu Harajuku is a Japanese-influenced animated children's television series created by singer-songwriter Gwen Stefani. It is based on her Harajuku Lovers merchandise brand, and the show doubles as a brand itself, with a line of tie-in products by Mattel. The show follows a teenage girl group called HJ5 and their manager Rudie who live in a fantasy version of Tokyo called Harajuku City. HJ5 is a quintet: the four Harajuku Girls (Love, Angel, Music and Baby) with their leader G. Episodes follow the band members and Rudie overcoming obstacles preventing them from performing.

Network Ten in Australia first commissioned an animated series based on the Harajuku Lovers franchise in 2013, but Gwen Stefani first had the idea to turn it into a TV series as early as 2004, when she introduced the brand. The cartoon is animated using Flash by the Malaysian studio Vision Animation, and it was produced with investment funding from the Australian state government agency Film Victoria. The show's music style was based on Stefani's first two studio albums, Love. Angel. Music. Baby. and The Sweet Escape. The American toy manufacturer Mattel launched the Kuu Kuu Harajuku merchandise line in Spring 2017.

The series is distributed by the Canadian media company DHX Media (now known as WildBrain). It had its Australian debut on 10 Peach (formerly known as Eleven) on 1 November 2015. A second season premiered on 1 July 2017, and the third premiered on 11 August 2018. DHX Media's Family Channel airs the show in Canada. The series received a mixed reception, as some of the critics disliked the concept's apparent racism and cultural appropriation, which has also been a criticism of Stefani's Harajuku Girls and the Harajuku Lovers brand as a whole.

== Overview ==
The show follows a teenage girl based on Gwen Stefani, nicknamed G, and her friends Love, Angel, Music and Baby (named after Stefani's real backup dancers), as they form the up-and-coming band HJ5. HJ5's bumbling manager Rudie works hard to hire performances for the band, but their gigs are always interrupted. The band always manages to overcome challenges using their combined strengths: G's leadership, Love's intelligence, Angel's creativity, Music's bravery, Baby's enthusiasm and Rudie's determination.

A villain named General NoFun and his minion, Commander Bo-Ring, often cause problems for HJ5 as they pursue a world along a lack of any entertainment. Other supporting characters include Twisty T, a famous music producer whom Rudie is desperate to impress; Say-Wah, an obsessed HJ5 fan who wants to join the band; Colonel Spyke, a stern soldier who dislikes pop music; and Mauve Madison, a talk show host who reports on HJ5.

== Episodes ==
Series	Segments	Episodes	Originally released	
Series	Segments	Episodes	First released	Last released
1	52	26	1 November 2015	13 August 2016
2	52	26	1 July 2017	23 December 2017
3	52	26	11 August 2018	28 December 2019

== Characters ==
=== Main ===
The main characters (clockwise): Rudie, Music, G, Love, Angel and Baby. The girls are all holding their Monster Pets. As seen in the third season.

G
Voice: Maggie Chretien
Color: Aqua ( White and Black)
G is the leader of HJ5. She is trustworthy and level-headed, though sometimes she has her qualms. She is the lead singer of the group. She keeps the band together, even through their difficult times, and is not afraid of any challenges. Her favorite instrument is the microphone. Her signature colors are aqua, white, and black and represents bows. She is based on Gwen Stefani.
Love
Voice: Daisy Masterman
Color: Red
Love is the smartest of HJ5. She is intelligent, smart, and creative, though sometimes she takes on too much. She has an aptitude for science and often comes up with inventions, though some of them backfire. Her favorite instrument is the keyboard. Her signature color is red and represents hearts.
Angel
Voice: Emma Taylor-Isherwood
Color: Yellow ( Blue)
Angel is the resident fashionista of HJ5. She is bubbly, cheerful, fashionable, and elegant, though sometimes she can be a little airhead. She loves fashion and style, as well as making people smile with her bright smile. Despite her cheerful personality, she can be very jumpy at some of this point. Her favorite instruments are the drums. Her signature colors are yellow and blue and represents stars.
Music
Voice: Sally Taylor-Isherwood
Color: Purple
Music is the second-in-command and active girl who is the lancer of HJ5. She is snarky, bitter, genuine, strong-willed, and tough, though at times, she can be easily annoyed. She is the brassy and fierce one of the band, as well as an exceptionally fighter and dancer. Music can be somewhat grumpy or get easily angry at times. Her favorite instrument is the guitar. Her signature color is purple and represents musical notes.
Baby
Voice: Charlotte Nicdao
Color: Pink
Baby is the youngest of HJ5. She is sweet, lovely, and lighthearted, though sometimes this gets her in trouble. She adores Cute Stuffs, and also loves to hug everyone. Her favorite instrument is the bass. Her signature color is pink and represents cuteness.
Rudie
Voice: Danny Smith
Rudie is the manager and the only male member of HJ5. He works hard to book them gigs; although his unfortunate tends to get him and the band in trouble, he deeply cares about their safety. He is associated with checkered-themed colors, most notably in monochrome (white, black, and gray).

=== Villains ===
General No–Fun
General No–Fun is the short, serious, and notorious leader of Nofunland.
Commander Bo-Ring
Commander Bo-Ring is General NoFun's chief assistant and a high-ranking official in Nofunland.
Say-Wha
Say-Wha is an obsessed HJ5 fan with an auto-tuned voice.
Madame Shhh
Madame Shhh is a woman who wishes to rid the world of music so that she can live in peace.
Sammy Starr
Sammy Starr is a music manager and Rudie's rival.
Moods Meow
Moods Meow is a cat that was owned by the main antagonist, General No–Fun.
Stegosaurus Stan
Stegosaurus Stan an elderly, Barneyesque children's show host who then wants to win back glory and revert everybody (including HJ5) back into toddlers.
Teen Genie
Teen Genie is an offensive teenage genie who wants to use the phrase "whatever."

=== Recurring ===
R.O.D.
R.O.D. is the HJ5's robotic personal assistant who speaks with a British accent.
Chewy
Chewy is the HJ5's pet Pomeranian. He is based on the creator's pet of the same name. He was originally owned by G.
Jimmy
Jimmy is Rudie's nephew and an aspiring photographer.
Twisty
Twisty is a music producer and millionaire. He loves to wear sneakers.
Mauve Madison
Mauve Madison is a popular talk show host and TV personality. She loves everything pastel violet-colored.
Zookeeper Smythe
Zookeeper Smythe is a zookeeper that works at the zoo.
Sparkski
Sparkski is hero microbe who helps the HJ5 with the band's problems.
Morgan and Macy
Morgan and Macy are a pair of twins that were managed by Sammy Starr.
Colonel Spyke
Colonel Spyke is the captain of the Harajuku Defense Squad who consists of multicolor-haired soldiers protecting Harajuku from strange creatures and animals.
Brodie
Brodie is Rudie's younger cousin who works as an intern for the band.

== Production ==
Kuu Kuu Harajuku is co-produced by Vision Animation in Malaysia, Moody Street Productions in Australia, and Red Flags Fly in the United States. It was distributed by DHX Media (Canada) and produced in association with Film Victoria for the first season and Network Ten for the second. A third season of the series was broadcast in 2018.

Pop singer Gwen Stefani initially proposed a Harajuku Girls television show or movie after the release of her 2004 studio album Love. Angel. Music. Baby. In Stefani's words, she "wanted to do an animated or live-action Harajuku TV show or movie since the conception of my [first] dance record." Almost ten years later, Stefani pitched an animated series based on the Harajuku Lovers brand at Kidscreen's 2013 Asian Animation Summit. In an interview with USA Today, Stefani explained that the show was not meant to represent the real-life Harajuku district: "the show's DNA, its visual ideas, was taken from Harajuku land, or whatever, but the show is definitely not that. It's a make-believe world where anything can happen." During a January 2014 interview with Women's Wear Daily, Gwen Stefani first revealed that the show had been greenlit by Network Ten and that fifty-two episodes were in development. In December 2014, the show was given the working title KooKoo Harajuku.

Speaking to Broadcasting & Cable about the inspirations for her series, Stefani stated that she had a history with animation as her older brother and No Doubt founder Eric Stefani worked on Fox's The Simpsons and The Ren & Stimpy Show. She said, "I grew up with tons of animation in my own life because my brother is an animator." When asked about her feelings on the renewal of Harajuku for a second season, she said "I still haven't digested that I'm even on Nickelodeon. It was a dream that I had a long time ago that came true later in life. I never thought it could happen."

The art style for the show was inspired by the Harajuku district in Tokyo. Four of the series' main characters (Love, Angel, Music and Baby) were modelled after Stefani's Harajuku Girl backup dancers, with body adjustments in order to give them "a modern update for a younger audience." Also unlike the Harajuku Girls, the Kuu Kuu Harajuku characters were designed as "ethnically ambiguous." Gwen Stefani herself served as the template for the series' lead character, G. The series' theme music was performed by Gwen Stefani and was written to incorporate lyrics from some of her past songs. Other music for the show was produced in a style Stefani describes as "similar to the music on my first two records ... a cross between an '80s video game and pop music."

Gwen Stefani officially announced a second season of Kuu Kuu Harajuku in March 2017. The season had been in development since October 2016. Compared to the first season, the second season was written to include more musical numbers and animated performances. A third season premiered in August 2018 in Australia.

== Release ==
=== Broadcast ===
Kuu Kuu Harajuku first premiered on 10 Peach (formerly known as Eleven) in Australia on 1 November 2015, and later premiered on ABC Me on 6 December 2016, and on Nickelodeon in the US on 3 October. Later, it was moved to the Nick Jr. Channel on 3 February 2017. The series also premiered on Family Channel in Canada on 1 November 2016. The series returned to U.S. streaming on the free live TV application Pluto TV on the Nick Jr. Pluto TV channel, until Nickelodeon lost the rights to air the series due to WildBrain. The series also aired on SABC 3 in South Africa from 2018-2020.

=== Home media ===
In February 2017, Shout! Factory signed a deal with DHX Media to secure the North American DVD and Blu-ray rights to Kuu Kuu Harajuku.

Region 1
DVD title	Season(s)	Aspect ratio	Episode count	Total running time	Release date(s)
Music, Baby!	1	16:9	7	154 minutes	13 June 2017
Super Kawaii	1	16:9	6	132 minutes	26 September 2017
Girl Power	1	1.78:1	7	154 minutes	20 February 2018

== Reception ==
=== Critical response ===
Emily Ashby of Common Sense Media gave Kuu Kuu Harajuku a mixed review upon its U.S. debut. She praised Love and G as positive role models, stating, "Love stands out for her can-do attitude and her bevy of ideas to solve all kinds of problems, and G is known for her coolness under pressure." In summary, however, Ashby called the cartoon "pretty mindless, and there are better choices for role models for this age group, but it's entertaining nonetheless."

Erica Russell of PopCrush argued that Kuu Kuu Harajuku's setting "is not Japan, but a culturally-empty, messily regurgitated Westernization of it. It's a whitewashed 'kawaii' fairy tale." Rae Alexandra of KQED criticized the decision to portray the Harajuku Girls as racially ambiguous, suggesting that "it seems Stefani (or network executives) thought the best way to deal with the overt cultural appropriation was simply 'let's not have them be Asian anymore.'" Likewise, Teresa Jusino of Dan Abrams' The Mary Sue called negative attention to the characters' races, writing, "I notice that the Harajuku Girls are all different colors. Points for diversity, I guess, except that it seems that they appropriated Japanese culture only to just about erase it from this series."

=== Awards and nominations ===
Year	Award	Category	Recipients and nominees	Result	Refs
2016	Asian Television Award	Best 2D Animation Programme	Vision Animation, Network Ten, Eleven (now 10 Peach)	Nominated	
