= Moira J. Moore =

Canadian writer

Moira J. Moore is a Canadian fantasy author.

== Biography ==
Moore was raised near Gloucester, Ontario. She began writing in earnest while at Emily Carr Middle School. Her interest in the fantasy genre began to blossom after studying Ursula K. Le Guin's Earthsea novels in grade 7, and she would escape school grounds during lunch hours to play Dungeons & Dragons with a group of friends. Subsequently, she went to high school at Canterbury High School (Ottawa) for the Performing Arts to study clarinet. Her post-secondary studies were at Carleton University and then a law degree at Queen's University.

She practices family law while writing in her spare time, or vice versa.

== Bibliography ==
=== The Hero Series ===
A series of books exploring the adventures and relationships of bonded Pairs (magic-endowed individuals termed "Source" and "Shield") who work together to make the land habitable and keep the citizenry safe.

1. Resenting the Hero (2006)
2. The Hero Strikes Back (2006)
3. Heroes Adrift (2008)
4. Heroes At Risk (2009)
5. Heroes Return (2010)
6. Heroes at Odds (2011)
7. Heroes' Reward (2012)

The Bonded Pair relationship works by the "Source" channelling the energy of disastrous natural events (such as earthquakes) while the "Shield" protects the Source from the effects of channelling. Their bond is such that the death of one would produce the death of the other. Bonding is involuntary but permanent and makes for a very intense working relationship between people who might not otherwise choose to have anything to do with each other.

The stories concern a particular bonded pair - Shintaro Karish and Dunleavy Mallorough - who are very different and initially totally fail to understand each other but ultimately come to recognise each other's worth. Their relationship is somewhat reminiscent of Elizabeth and Darcy in Jane Austen's Pride and Prejudice in that the middle-class Dunleavy (Lee) is prejudiced against the rich, aristocratic Shintaro (Taro) because of his (undeserved?) reputation.

On March 29, 2007, Moore announced on her blog that ACE would not be publishing book three of the series, despite an outcry from fans and the fact that this book was already written. On 14 April, however, she reported that ACE had changed their minds and published the third and fourth book.

Moore announced on her blog on August 30, 2011, that ACE would not be publishing the rest of the Hero series but she planned to complete the series and post it on her blog and/or website for people to read for free.
