= Jonathan Hobin =

- Born: Jonathan Hobin; September 28, 1979; Ottawa, Ontario, Canada
- Education: BFA in Image Arts: Photography, Ryerson University, Toronto, Ontario, Canada
- Known for: Photographic series exploring the darker side of childhood
- Spouse(s): Lucas de Faria, 2012

Jonathan Hobin is a Canadian photo-based artist. Born in Ottawa, Hobin's often shocking and meticulously curated photos deal with "the darker aspects of childhood, storytelling and politics." Hobin's work has received attention on an international stage, in particular his "In the Playroom" series and his work has achieved notoriety with audiences in Canada, the United States, Norway, Finland, Germany, and has been the subject of national and international debate with an audience of art critics, political movements, and the general public. The artist has recently been appointed as the Executive and Creative Director at the School of the Photographic Arts Ottawa. He is a part of collections owned by the Canada Council for the Arts, The Finnish Museum of Photography, the City of Ottawa, as well as having privately owned pieces in corporate and private collections all over the world.

== Early career and family history ==
Great Great Grandson of Politician William Wallace Cory, Great Grandson of Hockey Hall of Famer Horace Merrill, and son of the prolific architect Barry J. Hobin, the artist's early career was in production design. Hobin was the Canadian production Designer for the first Slovenian/Canadian film coproduction created in 2010 titled The Maiden Danced to Death, a collaboration with Academy Award-winning cinematographer Vilmos Zsigmond.

== Mother Goose series ==
Hobin completed a BFA in Image Arts from Ryerson University in Toronto in 2003. His 2009 Mother Goose exhibit shown at the Dale Smith gallery (now closed) was first conceived of by the artist while at Ryerson and prefaced the haunting exploration of the darker side of nursery rhymes, in which Hobin explored what curator Johanna Mizgala describes as "fables and other cautionary tales that are told to children as a means of socialization and initiation into the conventions of acceptable, moral behaviour." Hobin's work has consistently confronted the taboo the artist described as his "'love-hate relationship' with his childhood." Hobin states that the series underlines the contrast between nursery rhymes' content which typically illustrates a "societal ill that has no obvious relationship to the starry-eyed innocence we often associate with childhood"

== In The Playroom series ==
In 2010, the artist returned to the provocatively staged images of child models but turned from the macabre of nursery rhymes to even more socio-politically charged topics. The artist photographed "a combination of professional child models who worked for free (to gain experience) or ... children of family friends." As stated in the 2010 Macleans review, "[h]is topics are historic moments—mostly tragedies—immortalized and saturated by media coverage. Goodbye Mother Goose." The carefully crafted settings are populated by children who force to the fore tragedies like Lady Di's death, the 2004 tsunami, the murder of JonBenet Ramsey and the 9/11 terrorist attacks. In her 2014 essay, Lisa Farley Associate Professor in the Faculty of Education at York University, describes the series as ushering in "the surprising return of what is both familiar and difficult to face within the self." In a CNN interview on Hobin's work, Dr. Alvin Poussaint, professor of psychiatry and author at Harvard Medical University, advised that despite the perceived potential for trauma, the children involved seemed to treat the event like "halloween" or "playing make believe" and that children have "seen images of violence on the front page of the newspaper..so it's not like this is a first time for them."

== Little Lady / Little Man ==
"Reflecting on the death of a husband and wife through the use of a lullaby" these larger than life portraits of Hobin's grandparents at the end of their lives were described in Ottawa Magazine during their showing at Ottawa City Hall as "one of the best shows by a local artist to hit this city in the past year." Art critic Paul Gessell goes on to compare Hobin to sculptural phenom Ron Mueck describing the portraits as "what Mueck would deliver if he decided to start photographing real people instead of creating them in his studio." Gessell denounced criticism of the work as voyeuristic and characterized it unequivocally as "a work of love."

== Cry Babies series ==
Hobin's "Cry Babies" series continued to tackle issues of social tragedy, but with a heightened focus on "social stigmas and racial stereotypes" which Canadian Art magazine deemed "content worthy of comment" while still remaining critical that the artist had not "fully considered the question of racial caricature, and particularly how it relates to his own social status as a white male". However, as with most balanced criticism of Hobin's work, the author concedes that while the work provides no comfort, it leads to interesting and necessary questions regarding race. The consensus, even among the most venomous critics, seems to be that the series merits consideration. Hobin has been transparent about the fact that he would prefer strong reactions, even negative, over indifference and told Global News of the Cry Babies series, "if I'm going in that polarized direction, I'm really hitting the mark."

== Criticisms ==
In a 2012 interview, CBC's q radio host Jian Ghomeshi described Hobin as "one of Canada's most polarizing visual artists."

In her criticisms of the series, Canadian Art reporter Emily Falvey damned the series stating "although In the Playroom (2010) often succeeded in outraging the conservative audience it seemed destined to annoy, in the final analysis it was no more disturbing than video games or Anne Geddes posters, and not as nuanced as other photographic projects tackling similar issues"

Others deem the work a necessarily stark depiction of tragedies deserving of shock. In a 2010 interview, Vice Magazine quipped that "[s]ince "In the Playroom" is making a bunch of whiny babies upset" he connected with Hobin to discuss "the criticism he's received, the way kids absorb the news, how his entire series is a criticism of Western media, and whether or not we’re all giant kids playing adults."

In the 2015 publication "Art and Religion" by Aaron Rosen, Hobin is quoted stating that these news stories "have become our fairy tales...Play is how kids process information...And these pictures serve a purpose, as a moral, as a warming, just the way nursery rhymes did."

== Grants and awards ==
- 2015, 2014, 2013, 2012, 2011, 2010, 2009 - Ontario Arts Council - Exhibition Assistance Grant
- 2013, 2012 - Ottawa Art Gallery Auction - Critics Choice Award
- 2012 – Guatephoto Open Call Winner, Guatemala Photo Festival
- 2012 - Corel Endowment for the Arts Award
- 2012 - Magenta Foundation - Flash Forward Winner
- 2011 - SNAP! Photo Competition - Jim P. Shea Memorial Award for best overall submission
- 2011 - 2010 - Ottawa Arts Council : RBC Emerging Artist Award finalist
- 2011 - 2008 - Ontario Arts Council - Emerging Artist Grant
- 2011 - City of Ottawa - Emerging Artist Production Grant
- 2010 - 2009 - Nomination for Best Visual Art Exhibition of 2010 by (X)press
- 2010 - Applied Arts Magazine: Photography and Illustration Annual winner
