= Overruled! =

Canadian children's television sitcom

- Created by: Jeff Biederman; Jeffrey Alan Schechter; Jeff F. King
- Directed by: Paul Fox
- Starring: Jacob Kraemer; Sally Taylor-Isherwood; Nick Spencer; Jasmine Richards; Tammy Isbell; Tom Barnett; Sara Waisglass
- Opening theme: "Overruled!"
- Country of origin: Canada
- Original language: English
- No. of seasons: 3
- No. of episodes: 38

Production
- Executive producers: Jeff Biederman; Jeffrey Alan Schechter
- Camera setup: Multi-camera
- Running time: 30 minutes
- Production company: Shaftesbury Films

Original release
- Network: Family Channel
- Release: July 10 – November 19, 2009

Overruled! is a Canadian children's television sitcom about high school kids with problems, which are taken to Teen Court, hosted by Judge Tara; the series aired on Family Channel in Canada and Disney Channel in the United Kingdom. It premiered on July 10, 2009, in the United Kingdom and September 13, 2009, in Canada. In Canada, Family Channel premiered the show by airing episodes from the second season first. Then after the thirteenth episode of season 2, the channel ran all 13 episodes of season 1.

== Plot ==
The show centers around Jared "The Coop" Cooper and his friends: Russell "Rusty" Dougal, an eccentric transfer student, Kaleigh Stewart, one of the lawyers at teen court, and Tara Bohun, the judge at teen court. When Teen Court is in session, Tara is the judge, Rusty is the court clerk, and Kaleigh and Coop are the lawyers. As the cases often involve all of them, they all have to stay fair in court despite their friendships and prejudices which usually leads to more problems.

== Characters ==
- Jared "Coop" Cooper (Jacob Kraemer): Coop, 15, is a cool, fun, articulate charmer who never thought he'd voluntarily participate in any extracurricular activities that didn't involve his favourite pursuits: playing drums, sports and girls. But during his first week of tenth grade, Coop takes on one of the recently vacated lawyer positions in Banting High's teen court, and discovers his charm and confidence make him a natural for legal work. Through the series it is noticed Coop has a crush on Kaleigh, but he decides not tell her his true feelings when she rejects Ronald and swears off boys.
- Kaleigh Stewart (Sally Taylor-Isherwood): In the courtroom, Kaleigh, 15, is super-efficient and super-serious. Outside the courtroom, she likes to think she loosens up, but Coop would argue the contrary. Of course, when it comes to Kaleigh, Coop always argues the contrary. Kaleigh loves her job as a lawyer because it's the one place she feels totally in control. She knows exactly what to do, what to say and how to act. Outside the courtroom she's just as confused about the rules of being a teenager as anyone. Through the series it is noticed Kaleigh has a crush on Coop.
- Russell "Rusty" Dougal (Nick Spencer): Being the court clerk is serious business for Rusty, 15, who confidently bumbles his way through every court procedure. It's Rusty's job to make sure things run smoothly in the courtroom and, to everyone's surprise, he often succeeds. Rusty takes great pride in his court but once court is out of session he's just another awkward teenager in the hall. He is also known to be loyal, a popular quality for Scottish people.
- Tara Bohun (Jasmine Richards): Tara, 15, is Banting High's teen court happy-go-lucky judge. Though she may seem illogical and scatterbrained, her roundabout way of looking at things always leads to verdicts that are spot on. Speaking with Tara, you'd never know that her convoluted and bizarre logic would translate into courtroom decisions that actually show great insight and clarity, or that underneath her trendy clothes lurks a razor-sharp legal mind who calls things like she sees them.
- Linda Cooper (Tammy Isbell): Coop's mother who is just as normal as any mom. She and Gil, her husband, always want what's best for their kids.
- Gil Cooper (Tom Barnett): Coop's father who is a normal dad
- Jordana 'Jordy' Cooper (Sara Waisglass): Jordy, Coop's little sister, likes to pick on her brother just like any sister. She is known to be really bright for her age but also has a good friendship with her peers. She is gifted. In one episode, Jordy was interested in a boy, but it is not known if she is really interested in other boys.

== Production ==
=== Development ===
Shaftesbury Films sold the Overruled! to Family Channel in February 2008; the series was expected to produce 13-episodes for a late 2008 debut, but didn't air in Canada until 2010.

=== Filming ===
Riverdale Collegiate Institute in Toronto, Ontario is where the external shots of Banting High were taken.

== Episodes ==
=== Series overview ===
| Season | Episodes | Originally aired | |
| Season | Episodes | First aired | Last aired |
|---|---|---|---|
| 1 | 13 | July 10, 2009 (UK); February 4, 2010 (Canada) | September 25, 2009 (UK); May 13, 2010 (Canada) |
| 2 | 13 | September 13, 2009 | November 19, 2009 |

=== Season 1 (2009) ===
| No. | Title | Directed by | Written by | Original release date |
|---|---|---|---|---|
| 1 | "The Trials of Jared Cooper" | Steve Wright | Jeffrey Alan Schechter & Jeff Biederman | July 10, 2009 (UK); February 4, 2010 (Canada) |
After being dragged into jury duty at teen court, Coop unknowingly shows his stuff while trying to get through the trial quickly to get home for Jordy's piano recital.
| 2 | "Style Conscience" | Jeff F. King | Jeffrey Alan Schechter & Jeff Biederman | July 17, 2009 (UK); February 18, 2010 (Canada) |
Coop represents a cute girl in a case against school uniforms, but is surprised when she continues wearing the crazy clothes even after the case is over.
| 3 | "The Rusty Dougal Experience" | Steve Wright | Jeffrey Alan Schechter & Jeff Biederman | July 24, 2009 (UK); February 25, 2010 (Canada) |
Rusty's pumped about the upcoming battle of the bands and invites Coop into his new band . . . but when the band enlists Coop to fire Rusty, Coop may be in over his head.
| 4 | "Judge Tara's Decision" | Michael Mabbott | Jeffrey Alan Schechter & Jeff Biederman | July 31, 2009 (UK); March 4, 2010 (Canada) |
After a series of weird situations, the gang thinks that Tara's being bribed! But when they confront her about it, and she quits, will teen court ever be the same?
| 5 | "The Quarterback Sack" | Craig Pryce | Jeffrey Alan Schechter & Jeff Biederman | August 7, 2009 (UK); March 11, 2010 (Canada) |
After throwing the star quarterback's case in an apparent fit of jealousy, Coop needs Kaleigh's help to prove he doesn't "like her" (in that way).
| 6 | "The Way of the Coop" | Steve Wright | Matt MacLennan | August 14, 2009 (UK); March 25, 2010 (Canada) |
While Rusty joins Knit Club to re-knit some lost evidence, Coop tries to teach a mortified Kaleigh to be more "chillz" after she emails a confidential personality test to the entire school!
| 7 | "Circumstantial Evidence" | Craig Pryce | Therese Beaupre | August 21, 2009 (UK); April 8, 2010 (Canada) |
Coop defends Rusty when he's accused of sabotaging Howie's science fair project. But as the evidence mounts, Coop questions Rusty's innocence.
| 8 | "Take the Cheese Loaf and Run" | Steve Wright | Brian Hartigan | August 28, 2009 (UK); April 15, 2010 (Canada) |
It's now or never time after Coop goofs off during a case, prompting a student advisory council to evaluate the future of teen court at Banting High.
| 9 | "Snakes in the Grass" | Paul Fox | Matt MacLennan | September 4, 2009 (UK); April 22, 2010 (Canada) |
It's Coop versus his own hockey team, when the rules say a girl can't play on the team. But can Coop handle losing his spot on the team to the girl he helped win the case for?
| 10 | "Haunted High Court" | Steve Wright | Jeffrey Alan Schechter & Jeff Biederman | September 11, 2009 (UK); TBD (Canada) |
As Rusty hatches a plot to stay overnight and figure out if the school really is haunted, a trapped Coop and Kaleigh deal with some ghosts of their own – ghosts from their past that threaten to tear their friendship apart!
| 11 | "So Happy Together" | Jeff F. King | Jeffrey Alan Schechter & Jeff Biederman | September 18, 2009 (UK); April 29, 2010 (Canada) |
As Coop and Kaleigh represent opposing sides of a breakup, Rusty thinks he's fallen into the "Curse of the Dougal Men" and made Tara fall for him.
| 12 | "Help" | Michael Mabbott | Jeffrey Alan Schechter & Jeff Biederman | September 25, 2009 (UK); May 6, 2010 (Canada) |
While Rusty tussles in court with a bully, Coop tries to prove to his family that he is indeed handy by creating an automatic bed-maker for Jordy.
| 13 | "Two Boys and a Baby" | Paul Fox | Jeffrey Alan Schechter & Jeff Biederman | September 25, 2009 (UK); May 13, 2010 (Canada) |
Rusty and Coop disagree over the importance of looking after their robo-baby for a school project. While Rusty plays proud mama, Coop must figure out how to be a better papa, or else they'll both fail!

=== Season 2 (2009) ===
| No. | Title | Directed by | Written by | Original release date |
|---|---|---|---|---|
| 14 | "Canadian President" | Mitchell Ness | Jeffrey Alan Schechter & Jeff Biederman | September 13, 2009 |
Coop and the Teen Court gang find a new nemesis in Ronald and must battle him for the music room and Teen Court's very existence.
| 15 | "The Van Plan" | Marni Banack | Scott Oleszkowicz | September 13, 2009 |
When Principal Mathers takes over for Mr. Vickers as Teen Court advisor, Coop and the gang enact a plan to replace her with Banting's sub of all trades, Van Dansen.
| 16 | "Dream A Little Dream" | Mitchell Ness | Matt Schiller | September 20, 2009 |
Best buds Rusty and Coop have their friendship tested when Rusty gets offered a touring gig with mega band The Angry Possums.
| 17 | "Court Jesters" | Marni Banack | Jeffrey Alan Schechter & Jeff Biederman | September 27, 2009 |
Kaleigh tries to prank her way into proving she's funny, until her biggest prank backfires and turns her and Coop into the laughing stocks of the school.
| 18 | "Job Swap" | Jeff F. King | Jeffrey Alan Schechter & Jeff Biederman | October 4, 2009 |
Coop gets his shot at being judge but quickly finds out both Teen Court and his friendships work better when he's on the other side of the bench.
| 19 | "Competitive Spirits" | Mitchell Ness | Jeffrey Alan Schechter & Jeff Biederman | October 11, 2009 |
Coop and Kaleigh take over Banting's snack shop while Rusty's potential date is on trial for stealing.
| 20 | "Roleplay" | Paul Fox | Matt Schiller | October 18, 2009 |
Coop suffers from stage fright when he accidentally lands himself the lead in the school play, until the gang helps him give an unforgettable performance on opening night.
| 21 | "The Truth Shall Set You Free" | Mitchell Ness | Richard Rabkin & Matt Simmons | October 25, 2009 |
A recount in the Student Council election sees Coop challenge Ronald for the presidency only to retract his candidacy when he finds a way to ensure Ronald does right by Banting.
| 22 | "Worlds Collide" | Paul Fox | Matt MacLennan | November 1, 2009 |
Jordy comes to school to observe Teen Court and Coop finds her a useful ally in getting the attention of a potential date who resists his advances.
| 23 | "Valentine's Day Off!" | Paul Fox | Scott Oleszkowicz | February 10, 2010 |
When their Valentine's plans go south, the gang all agree to a group anti-date, until each ends up with a date and they have to find one for Kaleigh too.
| 24 | "Dummy Up" | Jeff F. King | Cole Bastedo & Matt Huether | November 5, 2009 |
Kaleigh's cousin, Kelly, comes to Banting and Coop charms her, until she proves clingy and Coop must enlist Kaleigh to let Kelly down easy.
| 25 | "Wrestling With Issues" | Paul Fox | Matt Schiller | November 12, 2009 |
Coop and Ronald battle it out for Kaleigh's affections… in the wrestling ring.
| 26 | "This Magic Moment" | Tony Poffandi | Jeffrey Alan Schechter & Jeff Biederman | November 19, 2009 |
Coop reveals his feelings for Kaleigh to Tara and Rusty and they try to create a magic moment where Coop can tell her how he feels. But Ronald thwarts his plans, and though Kaleigh rebuffs Ronald for his less than honest ways, she also swears off boys just as Coop is about to tell her how he feels. Special guest Micheal Seater

== International broadcast ==
Overruled! was expected to be picked up by Disney Channel in the United States, but the series never aired. It aired in Spain, The Netherlands and Belgium on Disney Channel Europe. The series also aired in Poland on ZigZap, and in Portugal on Panda Biggs.
