= Strange Days at Blake Holsey High =

- Also known as: Black Hole High
- Created by: Jim Rapsas
- Starring: Emma Taylor-Isherwood; Shadia Simmons; Michael Seater; Noah Reid; Robert Clark; Jeffrey Douglas
- Countries of origin: Canada; United States
- Original language: English
- No. of seasons: 4
- No. of episodes: 42

Production
- Running time: 25 minutes
- Production companies: Fireworks Entertainment; Costume & Production Services (season 3)

Original release
- Network: Global TV (Canada); Discovery Kids (US)
- Release: October 5, 2002 – January 28, 2006

Strange Days at Blake Holsey High (also known as Black Hole High) is a science fiction television series which first aired in North America in October 2002 on Global TV. It is set at the fictional boarding school of the title, where a Science Club (five students and their teacher) investigates mysterious phenomena, most of which is centered on a wormhole located on the school grounds. Spanning four seasons, the series developed into a success, and has been sold to networks around the globe.

Created by Jim Rapsas, the series intertwines elements of mystery, drama, romance, and comedy. The writing of the show is structured around various scientific principles, with emotional and academic struggles combined with unfolding mysteries of a preternatural nature. In addition to its consistent popularity among children, it has been recognised by adults as strong family entertainment. Forty-two episodes of the series, each roughly twenty-five minutes in length, have been produced, the last three of which premiered in January 2006. Those three final episodes that aired were combined into a film, Strange Days: Conclusions. The show was filmed at the Auchmar Estate on the Hamilton Escarpment in Hamilton, Ontario.

== Premise ==
The show revolves around a group of five friends and their favorite teacher. Together they join the Science Club at Blake Holsey High, a boarding school located in southern Ontario. The name "Blake Holsey" is a pun on the concept of a black hole in that preternatural events constantly happen at the school and affect the students, sometimes as an unexpectedly drastic consequence of their own minor misbehavior. The school's science club considers what a wormhole, a floating Qigong ball, and Pearadyne Industries, a lab that was destroyed years ago right next to the school, all have to do with the mystery.

== Characters ==
- Josie Trent (portrayed by Emma Taylor-Isherwood) is the show's main protagonist, an intelligent and curious new student who transfers to Blake Holsey High at the beginning of the series, and is the one who discovered the wormhole first.
- Corrine Baxter (portrayed by Shadia Simmons) is Josie's best friend and roommate, Corrine is the so-called "brains" (with a self-claimed IQ of 172) in the Science Club.
- Lucas Randall (portrayed by Michael Seater) is a conspiracy theorist and the most driven member of the Science Club.
- Marshall Wheeler (portrayed by Noah Reid) is Lucas' best friend and roommate, Marshall is more social and fun loving than Lucas.
- Vaughn Pearson (portrayed by Robert Clark) is the fifth student in the Science Club. Vaughn is intelligent but sometimes struggles in school as a result of dyslexia and has preferred pursuing athletic activities. His father is Victor Pearson, the owner and founder of Pearadyne Industries.
- Professor Noel Zachary (portrayed by Jeff Douglas) – Professor Zachary, or "Z", is the presiding teacher of the Science Club.
- Principal Amanda Durst (portrayed by Valerie Boyle) is the disagreeable Principal Durst is a looming presence over the Science Club, and differs with Professor Zachary's easygoing ways. A former science teacher, she is a reluctant conspirator in Victor Pearson's plans.
- Victor Pearson (portrayed by Lawrence Bayne) is a benefactor of the school and a constant antagonist to the Science Club's investigations.
- The Janitor (portrayed by Tony Munch) is an enigmatic character who seems to understand the mysteries at Blake Holsey High.

== Episodes ==
=== Series overview ===
Season	Episodes	Originally released	
Season	Episodes	First released	Last released
1	13	October 5, 2002	March 1, 2003
2	13	September 13, 2003	January 1, 2004
3	13	September 4, 2004	March 26, 2005
4	3	January 28, 2006	January 28, 2006

=== Season 1 (2002–03) ===
No. overall	No. in season	Title	Directed by	Written by	Original release date
1	1	"Wormhole"	Patrick Williams	Bruce Kalish & Jim Rapsas	October 5, 2002
Josie Trent arrives at Blake Holsey High shortly after the school's science teacher, Professor Middleton, mysteriously disappears as a result of a wormhole (also called black hole or vortex). She and Corrine are also sucked into the wormhole, and find themselves in Pearadyne Labs on October 4, 1987, the day of a major accident.
2	2	"Invisible"	David Warry-Smith	Jeff Biederman	October 12, 2002
Marshall, feeling unappreciated, turns invisible. Although he has fun at first playing practical jokes, he doesn't enjoy the experience anymore when he discovers that he is fading away.
3	3	"Magnet"	Patrick Williams	David Garber	October 19, 2002
A magnetic field develops around Josie after an accident with her and Corrine's science project. She has fun attracting metallic objects to mess with a popular girl until her powers grow out of control and she becomes untouchable.
4	4	"Thursday"	David Warry-Smith	Lorianne T. Overton	November 16, 2002
Corrine repeats what she considers the worst day of her life over and over, in a manner similar to Groundhog Day. The loop only ends when she is able to look at the day optimistically.
5	5	"Lifetime"	David Warry-Smith	Skander Halim	November 23, 2002
After being bitten by a mayfly, Lucas' genetic code is altered so that the aging process is rapidly accelerated – similar to that of a mayfly. Despite enjoying the freedom of being an adult, he quickly learns that there are many disadvantages of growing up too fast.
6	6	"Fate"	Anthony Browne	Jeff Biederman	December 7, 2002
Vaughn accidentally changes the present when he and Josie travel back in time to 1977, inadvertently preventing his parents from meeting (similar to Back to the Future). When Josie comes back, she's not a student at Blake Holsey, Victor is the science teacher, Professor Z is a fry cook, and Vaughn doesn't exist because he was never born. Josie must restore the relationship between Victor and Sarah Lynch to change Blake Holsey High back. During that process, Victor steals Josie's floating Qigong ball.
7	7	"Culture"	Stefan Scaini	Joe Rassulo	December 14, 2002
A clone of Josie is accidentally created from saliva on her chewing gum, which further strains Josie's relationship with her mother when Kelly Trent comes by for an unexpected visit. The clone is sent elsewhere through a vortex (not the one in Professor Z's office) by the janitor, to another place where she belongs and where "friends are waiting for [her]".
8	8	"Radio"	Anthony Browne	David Garber	January 4, 2003
Lucas finds a radio receiver picking up signals from the future, which is found out to be from Pearadyne Labs. The radio picks up warning of disintegration of the school by ultrasound (from Victor's demonstration), and later compulsory purchase of the school by the government. To save the school, the Science Club devise a plan to evacuate the school and divert the media.
9	9	"Storm"	Don McCutcheon	Jeff Biederman & Richard Clark	January 11, 2003
When Victor asks Vaughn to spy on the Science Club, Vaughn's emotions manifest themselves in a series of localized storms, which can only be resolved when he releases all the pressure inside him by defying his father, and telling the truth about Josie's stolen journal.
10	10	"Who?"	Mitchell T. Ness	Suzanne Bolch & John May	January 18, 2003
Professor Z narrowly escapes being sucked into the black hole, but loses a huge part of his memory in the process. The Science Club must restore his memory before his semi-annual Teacher Review, which if he fails can lead up to his termination. At the teacher review, Josie, Lucas, Vaughn and Marshall get busted helping Z as students are not allowed to attend teacher reviews, leaving Corrine to save the day.
11	11	"Lost"	David Warry-Smith	Jeff Biederman & Bruce Kalish	January 25, 2003
Strange magnetic field effects cause Josie and Vaughn to lose their way in the forest while searching for the Pearadyne Labs building. As Principal Durst and the rest of the Science Club seek the two missing students, Josie's need to find the lab causes Vaughn to twist his leg.
12	12	"Robot"	Stacey Stewart Curtis	Suzanne Bolch & John May	February 8, 2003
Josie surprises everyone by completing her robot building project. However, when Josie uses circuit boards from Pearadyne, the robot takes on Josie's personality and behaves chaotically during an inspection by Pearadyne labs.
13	13	"Shrink"	Patrick Williams	Jeff Biederman & Bruce Kalish	March 1, 2003
Josie laments her short height, but is then shrunk to a far smaller size. She uses an answer machine message to prevent Victor from selling Pearadyne Labs, and learns of a strange operation taking place on the school, covered up by "Blake Holsey High's first compulsory pizza and movie night". The students create a diversion to get out of attending the mandatory school function and observe the inspection. During observation Vaughn is shocked to learn his father is heading the inspection and Josie is in for a surprise when she learns about her mother's involvement.

=== Season 2 (2003–04) ===
No. overall	No. in season	Title	Directed by	Written by	Original release date
14	1	"Wormhole 2"	Stefan Scaini	Jeff F. King	September 13, 2003
Josie gets sucked into a vortex, sending her three hours into the past. If she doesn't enter the vortex on due time, she will be permanently stuck in an alternate dimension. Meanwhile, Josie's mother thinks about cooperating with Victor.
15	2	"Pheromones"	Stacy Stewart Curtis	Thérèse Beaupré	September 20, 2003
When Madison runs for President of the Student Council, Josie runs against her for the sole purpose of defeating her. Josie promises to change the system of grading, while Madison uses pheromones to capture everyone under her control.
16	3	"Cold"	Stefan Scaini	Jeffrey Alan Schechter	September 27, 2003
Marshall is going about the school with a cold, and his sickness spreads via wireless computer networking to the entire school with chills, fever, and sneezing. Students who have purchased a special computer system that allows them to surf the web are demanding refunds when a thick green mucus is disrupting the system.
17	4	"Genome"	Stacy Stewart Curtis	Kevin Lund & T.J. Scott	October 4, 2003
A class DNA project goes awry when Lucas' DNA is altered and his personality changes from a bookworm to being absolutely fearless, but lacking self-control. His friends must save him from Stu Kubiak, who angrily calls a fight with him.
18	5	"Brainwaves"	Marni Banack	Jeff Biederman	October 11, 2003
When Lucas decides to measure Vaughn's brain activity with an EEG machine, their two mental states are switched, with Lucas' brain in Vaughn's body, and vice versa.
19	6	"Chemistry"	Sheri Elwood	Ian G. Saunders	October 18, 2003
Marshall's older brother Grant, comes to town when applying for a job at Pearadyne, but an accident with molecular models sends Marshall through the periodic table, into helium, oxygen, neon, chlorine, and on the path to uranium. Meanwhile Grant becomes sodium as he arrives at school. The two eventually meet and are turned back to normal by forgiving each other, producing the stable molecule sodium chloride (table salt).
20	7	"Ecosystem"	David Warry-Smith	Andrew Nicholls & Darrell Vickers	December 6, 2003
When Josie takes Corinne's music CDs for a surprise birthday gift, a rumor starts that Josie is a kleptomaniac. However, the rumors are also correlated to Porifera sponges reproducing at an abnormal rate.
21	8	"Technology"	Terry Ingram	Elizabeth Stewart	December 13, 2003
Marshall finds old SIM cards in the basement of Pearadyne Labs, and produces a homemade mobile phone. The chips contain powerful encryption technology which Marshall explains to Tyler. Subsequently, Tyler forces Marshall into helping him cheat saying that he will help him with his sales. Using the encryption technology, Tyler sends an emoticon (:-X) to Marshall, causing all communication to come out as meaningless gibberish. When Durst accuses Marshall of cheating, the others must get him to talk normally so he may speak in his defense.
22	9	"Equation"	T.J. Scott	Jeffrey Alan Schechter	January 3, 2004
In preparation for Burton J. Zucherman Science Olympiad, Corrine chastises the Science Club for incorrect equations. When she alters the equations, the other Science Club members manifest into those equations – Lucas' luminosity equation causes him to glow like a firefly's backside, Josie is able to jump very high, Vaughn has unlimited momentum, and Marshall vaporizes.
23	10	"Hemispheres"	Graeme Campbell	Thérèse Beaupré	January 10, 2004
When Corrine auditions for Magnet 360 (Marshall's band) as a singer, she looks at an antique mirror, through which she travels. Everyone there is opposite (for example, Vaughn, the athlete, is a bookworm) and everything appears as a mirror image (i.e. whenever she would normally, say, go left, now she must go right). To return, Corrine must learn to use the creative half of her brain without losing her ability to use her logical side.
24	11	"Nutrition"	Terry Ingram	Thérèse Beaupré & Jeff F. King	January 17, 2004
Students are becoming addicted to energy bars, including Lucas and Vaughn, who are unwilling to give them up. The others must attempt to save them when it is discovered that they contain zero calories of energy, thus weakening the addicts.
25	12	"Echolocation"	Larry McLean	Jeff F. King & Jeffrey Alan Schechter	January 24, 2004
When Josie's hearing becomes super-sensitive, she overhears Victor underground talking about running tests and investigates with Vaughn.
26	13	"Stopwatch"	Jeff F. King	Jim Rapsas	January 31, 2004
Josie's watch acquires the ability to stop time, which she uses to take back the Chi ball that Victor stole in 1977. However, when her watch breaks, Lucas ends up saving her when he realizes that the watch does not stop time, but merely slows it down greatly. The damaged parts are spun on a high-speed centrifuge, bringing Josie back to normal. However, her clone, who has obtained the stopwatch, stops time again and gives the Chi ball back to Victor.

=== Season 3 (2004–05) ===
No. overall	No. in season	Title	Directed by	Written by	Original release date
27	1	"Transference"	Marni Banack	Jeff F. King & Jeffrey Alan Schechter	September 4, 2004
After an argument, Josie's intelligence transfers to Vaughn faster every minute, to the point where Josie is on the verge of collapse and Vaughn rebuilds a cold fusion reactor for his father. Meanwhile, Josie's clone returns the floating Qi ball to Victor.
28	2	"Nocturnal"	Stefan Scaini	Jeff F. King & Jeffrey Alan Schechter	September 11, 2004
Josie, wanting to prove she doesn't need sleep, becomes cathemeral when she falls asleep on her project with a laboratory mouse and starts having waking dreams of Victor Pearson. Before long, she realizes that these aren't dreams, but rather Vaughn's memories.
29	3	"Allure"	Stefan Scaini	Thérèse Beaupré	September 25, 2004
Corrine's need to schedule every moment of her life upsets Marshall, who wants to be able to spend some random free time with her. Before they can talk about it, Corrine's Venus Flytrap turns into a human being – a girl named Diana who attracts the attention of all the boys at school and leaves mysterious marks on their arms. When Diana sets her sights on Marshall, Corrine must stop her before she eats Marshall alive.
30	4	"Tesseract"	Ron Murphy	Jeffrey Alan Schechter	October 2, 2004
While his friends are away during a long weekend, Lucas stays behind to spy on Victor's movements. Instead, he finds a tesseract device hidden in Professor Z's office. After activating it, the school begins to fold in on itself like a mathematical tesseract. Lucas discovers what happened to Professor Middleton and learns something about Vaughn.
31	5	"Camouflage"	Sheri Elwood	Thérèse Beaupré	October 9, 2004
During a fundraiser car wash, Tyler Jessop develops the special ability of becoming a human chameleon and so exploits the Science Club by eavesdropping on several conversations disguised as themselves to try to find out something about the vortex.
32	6	"Nanotechnology"	Jeff F. King	Amy Jacobson	October 30, 2004
Josie swallows a microscopic videocamera when trying to use it to spy on Tyler. The microscopic items return to normal size when the batteries are drained, so the Science Club must free the videocamera before it expands inside Josie. The science club also discovers something about Tyler.
33	7	"Vision"	Mitchell T. Ness	Kevin Lund	December 4, 2004
Tired of losing at the card game Hearts, Lucas gives X-ray vision to his glasses, which in effect prevents him from seeing properly and causes him to become trapped in the Pearson residence.
34	8	"Hologram"	Terry Ingram	Kevin May & Jeffrey Alan Schechter	December 11, 2004
Vaughn's mother sends a message for him and Josie through the wormhole. The capsule does not open except for Josie and Vaughn through biometrics and their DNA is from the future. They discover a hologram of Sarah Lynch, asking for a pendant from Vaughn that she had given to him as a gift, but gave to Victor Pearson (Vaughn's dad) for safekeeping. Josie questions whether or not the hologram was really sent by Vaughn's mother. Meanwhile, the entire task must be completed in 25 minutes before the capsule is sent back.
35	9	"Probability"	Mitchell T. Ness	Jennifer Kennedy & Jeff F. King	January 8, 2005
Marshall writes horoscope predictions to get out of an assignment for a school paper. This inverts the Bell Curve, and Marshall's predictions start coming true: Corrine has a horrible day, Josie finds out she's going on a trip to Europe, and Lucas' father wins a huge prize at a fishing competition. However, a typo indicating that "a member of the Science Club will die" instead of "diet" means a series of freak accidents.
36	10	"Chirality"	Stacey Stewart Curtis	Thérèse Beaupré	January 15, 2005
Josie skips out on Principal Durst's lecture about chirality. Another experiment goes awry when the black hole's energy affects several test tubes and Principal Durst, in trying to transform carvone to its left-handed form, exchanges personalities with Professor Z. At the end, Vaughn and Josie discover that they may be the only people on Earth to have left-twisting DNA.
37	11	"Friction"	Graeme Campbell	Jeff F. King & Jeffrey Alan Schechter	January 22, 2005
Vaughn discovers a security tape of the Pearadyne explosion showing Sarah leaving behind Victor and speaking to Corrine when she first fell into the wormhole, but refuses to believe that Corrine cannot recall what happened. When they end up stuck together, Josie and Marshall get second thoughts about the two. While the rest of the Science Club tries to find a way to separate them, Vaughn and Corrine sneak into Pearadyne ruins to learn the truth.
38	12	"Past"	Jeffrey Alan Schechter	Jeffrey Alan Schechter	March 19, 2005
When Lucas's gravity sensor is operational, meaning they can now see when the wormhole opens, Josie worries that Vaughn will enter the wormhole without anyone's consent in an effort to talk with his supposedly dead mother. Josie enters the wormhole by herself and is transported to October 4, 1879 (when Blake Holsey High was founded by Avenir), and her friends end up stranded with her when they go through the wormhole to try to bring her back.
39	13	"Inquiry"	Jeff F. King	Jim Rapsas	March 26, 2005
Vaughn is lost in the wormhole and travels back in time to April 11, 1977, so Josie goes into the wormhole again to rescue him. Meanwhile, the rest of the Science Club learn more about the nature of the wormhole and the major time periods it connects to in an effort to bring back their friends. When Josie realizes that she has been responsible for a number of the events, she breaks a promise to her friends and goes through the wormhole alone to take the floating Qi ball from Victor again. However, she has altered the future irreparably and discovers that Blake Holsey High is non-existent when she returns. Instead she has become trapped in another timeline.

=== Season 4 (2006) ===
No. overall	No. in season	Title	Directed by	Written by	Original release date
40	1	"Conclusions"	Jeff F. King	Jeff F. King & Jim Rapsas	January 28, 2006
41	2	"Conclusions"	Jeff F. King	Jeff F. King & Jim Rapsas	January 28, 2006
42	3	"Conclusions"	Jeff F. King	Jeff F. King & Jim Rapsas	January 28, 2006
Part 1: A year after Josie steals the Qi ball from Victor, Victor is in ruins and a man named Jack Avenir is chairman of the board and plans to close the school after the students graduate. Vaughn, estranged from Victor, quickly becomes part of Avenir's plans. In the Science Club, Lucas becomes increasingly obsessive with finding Josie, who reappears suddenly from the wormhole. However, she is quickly exposed as Josie's clone when she realizes that she is unable to open Victor's device to receive Sarah Pearson's message. Part 2: Josie's clone and the Janitor reveal to Lucas and Professor Z that the original Josie is trapped in an alternate timeline where she is the only inhabitant. Realizing that she can't replace Josie on Earth, she decides to replace her in the alternate dimension. Since Josie recovered Sarah's pendant in the alternate timeline, Josie's clone explains the circumstances behind the creation of the alternate timeline, the necessity of Victor stealing the Qi ball, and the threat that Avenir poses. Josie's clone sends Josie back to the original timeline, while the clone is trapped in alternate timeline. When the real Josie returns, she discovers that Avenir is her father. Part 3: Josie, faced with the revelation that Avenir is her father and the true villain behind the events at Blake Holsey, becomes upset and turns to Professor Z for advice. When Marshall visits from his new school for everyone's graduation, the Science Club, except Vaughn, are reunited again. At Victor's house, Josie opens the device with Sarah's message detailing specific instructions that will allow them to stop Avenir from achieving his goal at last; having learned about different alternate universes, he intends to control each universe. Josie and Vaughn are forced to confront one another as Avenir tries attain control of the universe, but ultimately fails and disappears while Sarah Pearson finally returns to the timeline. With the wormhole destroyed, the Janitor is trapped, but grateful that Josie has stopped Avenir for good.

== Significant objects and locations ==
- Qigong Ball/Chi Ball/Floating Ball: Once a normal ball used to handle stress, but became a source of unlimited potential. Josie had used these balls for relaxation, but during Science Club, one was taken from her by Professor Zachary. The other one was affected by the energy of the wormhole in a trip to the 1970s, which made it gravity-less. It defies the laws of physics, which was why a younger Victor Pearson steals it from Josie years ago when he was in Blake Holsey High. Presenting it to Sarah Lynch, they started their plan to create Pearadyne Industries. Using the Chi Ball to power their lab, it caused an explosion, which led to the destruction of Pearadyne and Sarah's disappearance. Consequently, a wormhole formed at Blake Holsey and caused other strange occurrences. When Josie finds the ball again, she assumes that Vaughn and Victor had plotted to use it. Josie steals it back from them and replaces it with the Chi Ball's original normal partner, leaving Victor under the impression that the Chi Ball has somehow lost its power. However, Josie's clone from the future steals the floating ball back and places it back into Victor's hands.
- Wormhole: A powerful vortex that can lead to either the future or the past that can be found in the office of Blake Holsey's science teacher. The exact time and duration the wormhole is open is apparently sporadic and it is uncertain when it will lead. Many agents have attempted to keep the knowledge of the wormhole a secret from everyone, however the energy released from the wormhole has affected the students and the school due to the emotions and conditions of the students.
- Pearadyne Industries/Labs: A laboratory created by Victor Pearson and Sarah Lynch. It was used to create inventions and master quantum physics. On October 4, 1987, Pearadyne was destroyed in an explosion that covered the disappearance of many workers, including Sarah Lynch (Vaughn's mother).

== History ==
Strange Days at Blake Holsey High began airing in Canada on Global as well as VRAK.TV in Quebec. In the United States, meanwhile, it aired on Discovery Kids and NBC, Also airing in the Philippines on ABS-CBN. In late March 2003, almost six months after its North American debut, the series was sold to several international markets at the annual MipTV, which was held at Cannes, France. After the series ended, reruns aired on The Hub until June 25, 2011. The British broadcasting network ITV acquired UK terrestrial television rights to the series, while Fox Kids Europe acquired pay television rights in the UK, Israel, Italy, the Netherlands, Poland, Portugal and Scandinavia, who themselves pre-sold the series to Disney Channel for Latin American and Australia. In Russia (Tomsk), the series airs on CTC. In Denmark, it airs on TV2 Denmark. It also airs in other European countries such as Norway (and other Scandinavian nations), the Netherlands, Portugal, Israel, Poland, Turkey and Italy, as well as Colombia in South America. The children's television channel in the UK, PopGirl, acquired the rights to show the series in 2012 with a host of other acquired programmes including another season of Life With Derek, Family Biz, Mortified and Zoey 101. They were bought together and Black Hole High was the last to be shown. Coming Soon trailers started broadcasting on the channel until its 29 September debut. It was the first airing of the show in almost five years. The series is currently airing.

Fireworks Entertainment, the company behind Strange Days at Blake Holsey High, closed down after the production of Season 3. There were three additional episodes of the series, which aired as a finale film event on January 28, 2006, on the Discovery Kids channel, as "Strange Days Conclusions". As of June 2006, no episode or season of Strange Days at Blake Holsey High has been legally released to DVD in any country. In 2004 it was announced that a DVD box set of season one was to be released in the United Kingdom on July 26, 2004, and websites such as Amazon put up the DVD for pre-order. The release was later pulled without explanation.

Strange Days at Blake Holsey High has been nominated for several awards, but won none. Writers Jeff King, Jeff Schechter and Thérèse Beaupré were nominated for episodes broadcast in the year 2003 at the 31st Daytime Emmy Awards in 2004, in the category Outstanding Writing in a Children's Series. Emma Taylor-Isherwood, Shadia Simmons and Robert Clark were each given Young Artist Award nominations in early 2003, although Taylor-Isherwood was placed in the supporting category, Simmons was elevated to lead, and Clark was considered a "guest actor". Simmons received a second nomination the following year, alongside Talia Schlanger (Madison). The Academy of Canadian Cinema and Television nominated creative team Tony Thatcher, Adam Haight, Jeff King and Kevin May for Best Children's or Youth Fiction Program or Series at the annual Gemini Awards in late 2004, and the Directors Guild of Canada also recognised the show in areas such as sound editing, team achievement, and the product as a whole in 2003 and 2004.

In 2006 Strange Days was nominated for two Emmy Awards: "Outstanding Children's Series" and "Outstanding Writing".

The series went on hiatus in the UK in early September 2006, but returned on November 6, 2006. The show has since been removed from the Jetix schedules.

The series is currently available for streaming on Amazon Prime.

== Sequel ==
Beginning in 2022, series creator Jim Rapsas produced a web series continuation of the story. Called Echoes, the show takes place 16 years after the events of "Conclusions" and is intended to show how the events impacted individuals in and out of the school. Robert Clark, Jeff Douglas, Tony Munch and Talia Schlanger reprised their roles as Vaughn, Professor Z, the Janitor and Madison. The web series ran from 2022 until 2024, but plans for a season 2 were cancelled due to a lack of funding.
