= Selfie (High Maintenance) =

- High Maintenance episode
- Homeless Heidi screams at her ex-boyfriend Mark
- Episode no.: Season 1 Episode 5
- Directed by: Katja Blichfeld & Ben Sinclair
- Written by: Katja Blichfeld & Ben Sinclair
- Original air date: October 14, 2016

Guest appearances
- Greta Lee; Hannibal Buress; Brett Gelman; Lena Dunham; Ismenia Mendes; Kyle Harris

Episode chronology
← Previous "Tick"	Next → "Ex"

Selfie is the season one, fifth episode of the comedy television series High Maintenance.

== Plot ==
The episode follows two plotlines where two different characters come in contact with The Guy, the series pot dealer character. The first being, Anja, a wannabe Instagram influencer that posts her entire life online. The first plotline ends with Anja interviewing The Guy about what it's like to live life as a pot dealer.

The second episode plotline follows Homeless Heidi, a grifter and hipster character originally seen in the second episode of the High Maintenance web series who hooked up with guys she found on OkCupid. Homeless Heidi is now married to her sugar daddy who indulges her every whim. In Selfie Homeless Heidi confronts her ex-boyfriend Mark from years ago that has written the story of their romance into a sitcom called "Homeless Helga." Homeless Heidi sues Mark in court and wins with the help of The Guy who is called as a witness when he discovers he is also a character in the sitcom.

The episode ends with Homeless Heidi getting her hair done before traveling to the Hamptons to meet up with her sugar daddy husband, and then pretending to be blind so she can scam her hairdresser into not paying.

== Critical reception ==
The A.V. Club, "Where Anja’s tale makes a powerful statement about the perils of self-indulgently turning the camera on yourself, the Homeless Heidi/Helga story ignores such warnings, and does exactly that."

Esquire, "We're meant to criticize, villainize, and empathize with these women, and to some degree we already do—all the time, in our lives and on other shows."

Vulture, ""Selfie" is a strange misfire for High Maintenance, if only because it's one of the few times that the series feels slight and glib."
