= List of Stitchers episodes =

Stitchers is an American science fiction crime drama series created by Jeffrey Alan Schechter. The series follows Kirsten (Emma Ishta), who has been recruited into a government agency to be "stitched" into the memories of people recently deceased to investigate murders and mysteries that otherwise would have gone unsolved. Cameron (Kyle Harris), a brilliant neuroscientist, assists Kirsten in the secret program headed by Maggie (Salli Richardson-Whitfield), a skilled covert operator. The program also includes Linus (Ritesh Rajan) a bioelectrical engineer and communications technician. Camille (Allison Scagliotti), Kirsten's roommate and a computer science graduate student, is also recruited to assist Kirsten as a "stitcher".

The series premiered on June 2, 2015, on ABC Family. In an October 2016 Facebook Live chat, it was announced that the series was renewed for a third season. On September 15, 2017, Freeform canceled the series after three seasons. A total of 31 episodes of Stitchers were produced ending on August 14, 2017.

== Series overview ==
Season	Episodes	Originally released	
Season	Episodes	First released	Last released
1	11	June 2, 2015	October 20, 2015
2	10	March 22, 2016	May 24, 2016
3	10	June 5, 2017	August 14, 2017

== Episodes ==
=== Season 1 (2015) ===
No. overall	No. in season	Title	Directed by	Written by	Original release date	US viewers (millions)
1	1	"A Stitch in Time"	Todd Holland	Jeffrey Alan Schechter	June 2, 2015	1.28
Kirsten Clark, a Caltech student with temporal dysplasia (which causes her to not have any perception of time), meets Maggie Baptiste, who tells Kirsten that her condition could be the key to Maggie's secret government program, wherein people's consciousnesses can enter into the memories of the recently deceased in order to solve crimes. The team's first endeavor is to find out who is planting bombs around town. After finding the culprit, Maggie tells Kirsten that she has clues about Kirsten's biological father, who was one of the creators of the Stitchers program.
2	2	"Friends in Low Places"	Steve Robin	Jeffrey Alan Schechter	June 9, 2015	0.98
Kirsten is about to stitch into Ed Clark, het non-biological father and co-founder – with Daniel Stinger, Kirsten's biological father – of stitching technology, when Maggie pulls her to stitch into Lisa Keller, who died from an overdose of a deadly new street drug. While an attempt is made to get the drug off the streets, Kirsten learns that Lisa was murdered at a rave. The team leads Detective Fisher, pulled into the Stitcher program to provide cover as the arresting officer on cases, to the man from the rave who drugged Lisa, thus saving another girl's life and stopping the inflow of drugs. It is also revealed that Kirsten's roommate, Camille, was paid to join the program to spy on Kirsten – revealing that the program had reason to monitor Kirsten long before she was recruited.
3	3	"Connections"	Melanie Mayron	Will Schifrin	June 16, 2015	0.92
Newlywed Lily Ross is murdered on her honeymoon with her husband Scott. In her memories at the Santa Monica Pier, Kirsten sees Scott make a phone call while away from Lily, who soon is pulled away. Another memory jump shows the couple arguing over Scott hiding money from her. Despite the evidence, Kirsten believes him to be innocent. Cameron manages to slow down the memories to show the money was for a necklace for Lily, which is presented at the pier. Scott mentions only two people who might have been involved in Lily's death, the hotel concierge, and their driver to the pier. Meanwhile, Kirsten finds a torn photo from the early days of the project and sets out to learn all who was in it.
4	4	"I See You"	Steve Miner	Vivian Lee	June 23, 2015	0.91
Cameron's voyeuristic neighbor is murdered, and the team must learn if what he might have seen inside a nearby apartment got him killed. It turns out that though Cameron's neighbor was presumed to be a peeping Tom, he was actually a Good Samaritan; he'd bought a painting to help an arguing couple as well as groceries for a struggling model. Meanwhile, Cameron confesses to Kirsten about a previous incident in the lab that reveals his jumpy and cautious behavior lately. He tells Kirsten about Marta who in the last stitch before Kirsten was recruited was unable to bounce out on time leading to her current state in the hospital where she has been in a coma for the past four months and Cameron would go and visit her at least every week because he felt responsible for causing the situation.
5	5	"Stitcher in the Rye"	Janice Cooke	Lynne E. Litt	June 30, 2015	0.80
Maggie and the team stumble upon a food truck owner named Justin who is also an ex-CIA agent who is now into conspiracy theories.The team is asked to look into the supposed murder because Maggie told them that he died of a heart attack but it seems otherwise. They head to the food truck that has been placed into police custody after Kirsten saw something when they stitched into Justin. It is revealed that Justin had received some documents that he claimed should be revealed to the public before he presumably died of a heart attack. Upon acquiring of the documents in the food truck, it explodes showing the nature of the documents to be of top security. The bad news is that the document is a type of disk that requires a special computer to decrypt. Kirsten then confides in Cameron that she is seen memories of her supposed past that she cannot fully grasp. She saw a teddy bear, a broken watch and Kirsten is continuously receiving encrypted messages from an unknown source and she received a copy of a book titled 'The Catcher in The Rye' in the mail. She is able to piece the cryptic message to the book.It had a hidden message informing her from Marta revealing that she was the one who gave Justin the algorithm and informing not to trust anyone at the Stitchers Program headed by Maggie.
6	6	"Finally"	Craig Siebels	Jonathan Greene	July 7, 2015	0.71
A mysterious car accident causes the death of a traumatic brain injury researcher. Meanwhile, Kirsten asks Linus for help deciphering a clue. She continues to question Maggie for more information on the origin of the Stitchers program.
7	7	"The Root of All Evil"	Roger Kumble	April Fitzsimmons	July 14, 2015	0.64
A Jane Doe is brought into the research lab and is later identified as a young girl whose dream of leading an extravagant lifestyle most likely lead her to her death. The Jane Doe and her friend who works at the spa reveal that they would house sit for the rich clients while the owners were away. In the stitch, Kirsten thinks that the Jane Doe, now identified as a wanna-be called Brenda Miller, would steal jewelry and stash it in her crumby toilet cistern in her apartment. Kirsten believes that Brenda witnessed an affair of Mr. Parksand, which is why she got killed, but it turns out that it was Mrs. Parks who had an affair which Brenda caught on video on her phone. Upon discovery of this, Mrs. Parks tried to buy her out but Brenda got greedy and threatened to tell on her leading to her death. Meanwhile, everyone is shocked when Kirsten's boyfriend Liam, who seems too perfect; arousing suspicion for Maggie and Turner when he suddenly shows up in town. Camille and Maggie do some digging.
8	8	"Fire in the Hole"	John Badham	Jeffrey Alan Schechter	July 21, 2015	0.68
When an airborne virus is let loose inside the lab, the team must race to find a cure based on the dead epidemiologist's research before they all succumb to the virus themselves. Kirsten stitches into the epidemiologist's brain so as to find a possible cure after Linus shows the symptoms of the deadly virus. It is shown that the dead epidemiologist injected the virus into her body system to which Kirsten does not understand why she would do that.After some attempts, the team has given up and come to terms that they might die so Maggie instructs them to make their last calls to their loved ones. Linus calls his parents and unable to reveal the nature of his work confesses to having a girlfriend much to his parents' shock and request that he must bring her over for dinner. Camille has no one to call because her parents walked out on her when she was 16. Kirsten shows hope and has no plan to die so she does not give up even though Cameron has accepted the fact that they might die. As they argue, they realise that the virus was activated due to the cooler conditions that are required to keep a body fresh and recall that the body of the epidemiologist was found in the bathroom and the hot shower was on so they decide to raise the temperature of the lab so as to kill the virus which succeeds. It is revealed that Maggie has a son called Benjamin whom she calls to apologize for not being a good parent.Kirsten learns from Maggie about the other part of the photograph revealing that Maggie knew Kirsten's mother and uncle.
9	9	"Future Tense"	Rob J. Greenlea	Eric Tuchman	July 28, 2015	0.84
The team investigates the murder of Vanessa, an internet psychic. When Kirsten enters Vanessa's mind, she sees premonitions of a model's life called Mia in danger. Vanessa had premonitions of Mia being killed by their producer who unfairly misuses the revenue collected from the psychics' show. Vanessa's co-host, Jessica is questioned by Cameron and Kirsten at the studio and she is able to tell that Cameron has a weak heart due to his heart transplant when he was 10 years old and that Kirsten has to come to terms with Liam's proposal. Linus previously told his parents that Camille is still his girlfriend. Camille agrees to keep up the facade when they are invited to dinner at his parents’ house, with Camille meeting Linus' parents for the first time where she impresses his parents and tells Linus' mother that she may see a possible future with Linus although unsure. Liam becomes frustrated with Kirsten not answering his marriage proposal and her continually lying about the Stitchers program. At the end of the episode, Liam is shown calling someone informing the caller that Kirsten said no to the marriage proposal and is inquiring about the next step to be taken.
10	10	"Full Stop"	J. Miller Tobin	Jeffrey Alan Schecter	August 4, 2015	0.81
Fisher and Cameron find themselves the targets of a shooting, which leaves Fisher in critical condition. The team stitches Kirsten into the memories of a dead waitress. Maggie identifies the killer as Robert Barbiero who is a former member of the Stitchers program who knew Kirsten's mother. The key that Kirsten found attached to her mother's tomb leads her to discover the truth behind her unique condition and her mother's death. The police later find Barbiero dead in his apartment. During the stitch, Kirsten is disturbed to find that someone was using him to send her a message through his memories. She also notices that Cameron happened to have walked through a crucial scene, but he cannot consciously remember it. Seeing that Kirsten is in danger, Cameron injects himself with a solution to stop his heart so that Kirsten can stitch in and retrieve the memories. While stitched in, Kirsten sees that most of the memories shown are of her previous interactions with Cameron. This includes a surprising scene of them first meeting when they were young children. After Kirsten bounces out, the team desperately tries to revive Cameron, but his fate is unknown.
11	11	"When Darkness Falls"	Steve Miner	Lynne E. Litt & Eric Tuchman	October 20, 2015	0.49
The team investigates the apparent suicide of a young man (Jeremy Sumpter) who also may be responsible for the disappearance of a missing female college student. After first entering the young man's mind in a stitch, Kirsten is continually spooked by him. Camille has plans to throw the biggest Halloween party possible. Note: This episode aired as a part of ABC Family's 13 Nights of Halloween, with events in the episode preceding the season finale "Full Stop".

=== Season 2 (2016) ===
No. overall	No. in season	Title	Directed by	Written by	Original release date	US viewers (millions)
12	1	"2.0"	Steve Miner	Jeffrey Alan Schechter	March 22, 2016	0.43
Cameron is successfully revived from the stitch, with Kirsten now knowing that he has romantic feelings for her, after accessing his memories. Fisher also survives from his injuries. Leslie Turner is killed in his apartment, and Kirsten stitches into his memories to find out who killed him. While entering Turner's mind, Kirsten discovers a connection regarding Ed Clark's death and memories of her father. After Turner's death, the Stitchers team is appointed a security team much to the dislike of everyone.
13	2	"Hack Me If You Can"	Silver Tree	Roger Grant	March 29, 2016	0.46
A hacker blackmailing an online dating service for unfaithful spouses is killed. The hacker's insulin pack was triggered by an e-mail from another hacker who ends up playing tech games (sometimes deadly) with Kirsten and other members of the Stitchers team. Maggie is promoted to the director of the Stitchers program, following Leslie Turner's death, by Mitchell Blair (John Billingsley), Turner's boss. After being revived from death, Cameron has a lease of life and wants to buy a motorcycle. Linus moves out of his parents' house, and furnishes his own high-tech apartment. Camille asks Fisher to train her in self-defense.
14	3	"The One That Got Away"	Janice Cooke	Eric Tuchman	April 5, 2016	0.34
Fisher's old boss is killed by a serial killer who is back on the prowl after years of dormancy. After stitching into Fisher's boss' mind, Kirsten learns that she was still investigating the serial killer before she was murdered. Camille's trouble-making older brother Theo (Logan Paul) comes to town. Camille already doesn't have time for her brother's mischief, while Linus convinces her to give Theo a chance.
15	4	"The Two Deaths of Jamie B."	Rob J. Greenlea	Vivian Lee	April 12, 2016	0.39
The team investigates the death of a man found in a dumpster. When Kirsten stitches into the man's mind, she discovers that he previously had two near death experiences and that his life was in danger with a connection on information of nano technology. After Theo steals Linus' stuff while staying with him, Camille interferes in making things right. Kirsten and Cameron have difficulty determining their relationship, despite each having romantic feelings for the other. Also, Cameron meets Nina, a girl with similar interests as him.
16	5	"Midnight Stitcher"	Norman Buckley	Shelley Meals & Darin Goldberg	April 19, 2016	0.38
An aspiring actress falls to her death, and the Stitchers team investigates whether she committed suicide or was pushed. Upon stitching into the young woman's mind, Kirsten learns that she was brainwashed and that she had a plan to kill a big time movie director Roman Bain (Michael Graziadei). Camille bumps into Liam, while working out in the same gym.
17	6	"The Dying Shame"	Nina Lopez-Corrado	April Fitzsimmons	April 26, 2016	0.37
The Stitchers team investigates the murder of a Chinese pop star. Fisher becomes close with the pop star's bodyguard to figure out what led to her death. Cameron and Nina continue dating, with Kirsten wanting to get to know her, despite Cameron being nervous about them meeting. Camille continues seeing Liam at Maggie's request, with Linus becoming suspicious. Kirsten searches for her mother.
18	7	"Pretty Little Lawyers"	Laura Belsey	Lynne E. Litt	May 3, 2016	0.36
A young lawyer is fatally poisoned, with her other colleagues being suspects. Maggie reconnects with Sam Lewis (Dondre Whitfield), an ex-boyfriend and the head of the law firm that the Stitchers team is investigating. Kirsten finds out about Camille and Liam's relationship, and also how Maggie had instructed it. Kirsten, after finding out, decides that Camille should stop the relationship between herself and Liam, due to it being too dangerous. Then also stated that she, herself, would pretend to be his girlfriend, going undercover to find out what he knows about her father, Daniel Stinger.
19	8	"Red Eye"	Chad Lowe	Story by : Shelley Meals & Andrew Zuber; Teleplay by : Darin Goldberg & Andrew Zuber	May 10, 2016	0.39
Twelve passengers die from heart attacks on a plane, with Kirsten having to stitch into all of their minds to find the common cause of their deaths. Cameron lying about his job has Nina suspicious. Linus' father has a health issue and refuses to have Linus help him with the matter.
20	9	"The Guest"	Steve Robin	Lynne E. Litt & Miguel Nolla	May 17, 2016	0.37
Kirsten finally meets her half sister Ivy Brown, to get answers on the whereabouts of her father, Daniel Stinger. While trying to get information from Ivy, Kirsten tells her about the current case the Stitchers team is working on: a number of investors of a popular app are being murdered. Mitchell Blair demands that all investigations on Daniel Stinger and Liam cease immediately. After having Nina stood up twice due to work, Nina makes Cameron choose between her and Kirsten. Linus' dad prepares for surgery. Liam agrees to tell Kirsten everything, however as he is walking to meet her he is shot and killed, potentially to silence him from telling Kirsten the truth. Meanwhile, Kirsten wonders how the shooter knew Liam was about to tell her the truth, and the only person that could have known was her half sister Ivy.
21	10	"All In"	J. Miller Tobin	Jeffrey Alan Schechter	May 24, 2016	0.38
Kirsten stitches into Liam's mind to get answers of his connection with Daniel Stinger, while doing so she learns very revealing secrets that Liam kept from her. Ivy reveals to Kirsten that her mother is still alive, which leads to Kirsten finding an old lab with stitching technology and a dead scientist that helped Kirsten's mother. Cameron reveals to Nina that he works for the NSA. After having his surgery, Linus's dad is still is suffering from complications. Fisher reunites with his estranged wife, Stephanie. It is revealed that Daniel Stinger has the fifth and final quantum computer which allowed him to hijack Kirsten's consciousness; he had been the anomaly all along. Whilst in a stitch Cameron's younger self, the anomaly takes Kirsten to a memory that originated in herself. It was a memory of her mother and herself; she is so happy that she doesn't want to leave. The real Cameron tries to persuade Kirsten to bounce, in order to be with him and everyone else in real life.

=== Season 3 (2017) ===
No. overall	No. in season	Title	Directed by	Written by	Original release date	US viewers (millions)
22	1	"Out of the Shadows"	J. Miller Tobin	Jeffrey Alan Schechter	June 5, 2017	0.48
Kirsten is still stuck in the memory of her mother after a number of days. She is finally bounced when Cameron breaks into the stitch as the consciousness of Kirsten's mother forcing her to leave. After being in lock down in the Stitchers lab, Linus finds out days later that his father died in surgery and that he also missed his funeral. Mitchell Blair has everyone in the Stitchers team arrested and with the prospect of Kirsten working with an entirely new team. With Ivy's help, Kirsten pretends to be a government agent to have the team released from government holding, and are soon taken back to the lab, when Blair's son is killed in a hit-and-run accident. Kirsten stitches into Blair's son mind and it is revealed that Daniel Stinger killed Blair's son to send a message to Kirsten. Blair is removed from overseeing the Stitchers program, with Maggie taking his position, after Kirsten spoke with Defense Secretary Decker (Richard Lawson) to continue working with her team. Later that night, Kirsten shows up to Cameron's place. He tells her that Nina left a letter breaking up with him; Cameron and Kirsten then kiss.
23	2	"For Love or Money"	Nina Lopez-Corrado	Adam Lash & Cori Uchida	June 12, 2017	0.36
The team investigates the murder of a young woman with connections to her heir boyfriend and his corrupt Russian businessman father. Kirsten and Cameron are now officially a couple, with Kirsten for the first time being emotionally reciprocal in a romantic relationship. Camille meets Amanda Weston (Anna Akana), the new medical examiner that will be working with the NSA, and romantic sparks immediately begin to fly. Linus begins to develop a more intimate friendship with Ivy, also having her help with a case, despite the fact that Maggie doesn't trust her.
24	3	"Perfect"	Geary McLeod	Don Whitehead & Holly Henderson	June 19, 2017	0.33
The team investigates the murder of a divorce lawyer, with the suspects pointing to his exes who had plastic surgery to please him. While Maggie is away on business, Cameron is left in charge of the lab, leaving Camille resentful that she did not the get the position. Linus instructs Kirsten and Cameron to abstain from sex, due to it interfering with Kirsten's stitching.
25	4	"Mind Palace"	Stacey K. Black	Lynne E. Litt & Miguel Nolla	June 26, 2017	0.39
The team investigates the murder of an MI-6 agent. Kirsten makes plans with Camille to reconnect with her mother again, behind Cameron's back. Camille and Linus agree to a double date with their significant others, Amanda and Ivy, respectively.
26	5	"Paternis"	Rob J. Greenlea	Brian L. Ross	July 10, 2017	0.30
Cameron's father James (Brian McNamara) is accused of killing a prison guard, Kirsten then stitches into the prison guard's mind to find out what really happened. Maggie returns from her business trip and Cameron is forced to reveal the location of Kirsten's mother to her, after accidentally letting it slip knowing about Kirsten's mother in the first place. Camille becomes worried that she will mess up her relationship with Amanda, while also looking backing on her troublesome childhood memories of her older brother Theo. Linus looks back on childhood memories of his father while also worrying why Ivy won't answer his text messages.
27	6	"The Gremlin and the Fixer"	Norman Buckley	Adam Lash & Cori Uchida and Andrew Zuber	July 17, 2017	0.35
A satellite programmer is killed with the investigation leading to Cameron immersing himself in underground gaming and finding a confidant in a fellow gamer named Zelda (Zelda Williams). Kirsten is still upset that Cameron revealed the location of her mother to Maggie, who then had her moved to an undisclosed location. Amanda breaks up with Camille and there is still uncomfortable tension between them. Linus and Ivy settle their issues just as Maggie and Fisher discover that Ivy has been in contact with Daniel Stinger.
28	7	"Just the Two of Us"	John Badham	Jeffrey Alan Schechter & Matthew Scott Kane	July 24, 2017	0.34
Kirsten awakens from a stitch to find the lab empty with only her and Cameron in the facility. During their time alone, Cameron and Kirsten try to figure out what is going on and where their colleagues are, they soon find out that every thing is not what it seems.
29	8	"Dreamland"	Rich Newey	Lynne E. Litt	July 31, 2017	0.40
Fred Overmyer (John Posey), a former air force cadet is killed; his death possibly being connected to extraterrestrial life. Kirsten stitches into Overmyer's mind and into his memories from over thirty years ago to figure out what led to his death. Stephanie gets a job offer in Washington, D.C., with Fisher contemplating moving there with her. Kirsten is finally told that Ivy has been in contact with Daniel Stinger; she and Linus then discover an even more shocking secret about Ivy.
30	9	"Kill It Forward"	Salli Richardson-Whitfield	Don Whitehead & Holly Henderson	August 7, 2017	N/A
The team investigates murders connected to an app that has random people killing for money. Ivy is shunned by Kirsten and Linus upon finding out that Ivy was partly in control of the young Cameron avatar in Kirsten's stitches.
31	10	"Maternis"	Steve Miner	Jeffrey Alan Schechter	August 14, 2017	N/A
With help from Ivy to make amends for betraying Kirsten and Linus, the Stitchers team finally apprehends Daniel Stinger and finds the location where Kirsten's mother Jacqueline is being held. Stinger then makes a deal to oversee the stitch of Kirsten stitching into Jacqueline's mind to awaken her from her coma (this being the first stitch done on a living person), however, a number of risks are taken to fulfill the mission. Amanda asks Camille to move in with her.
