= George Washington Carver Center for Arts and Technology =

George Washington Carver Center for Arts and Technology (since 2008)

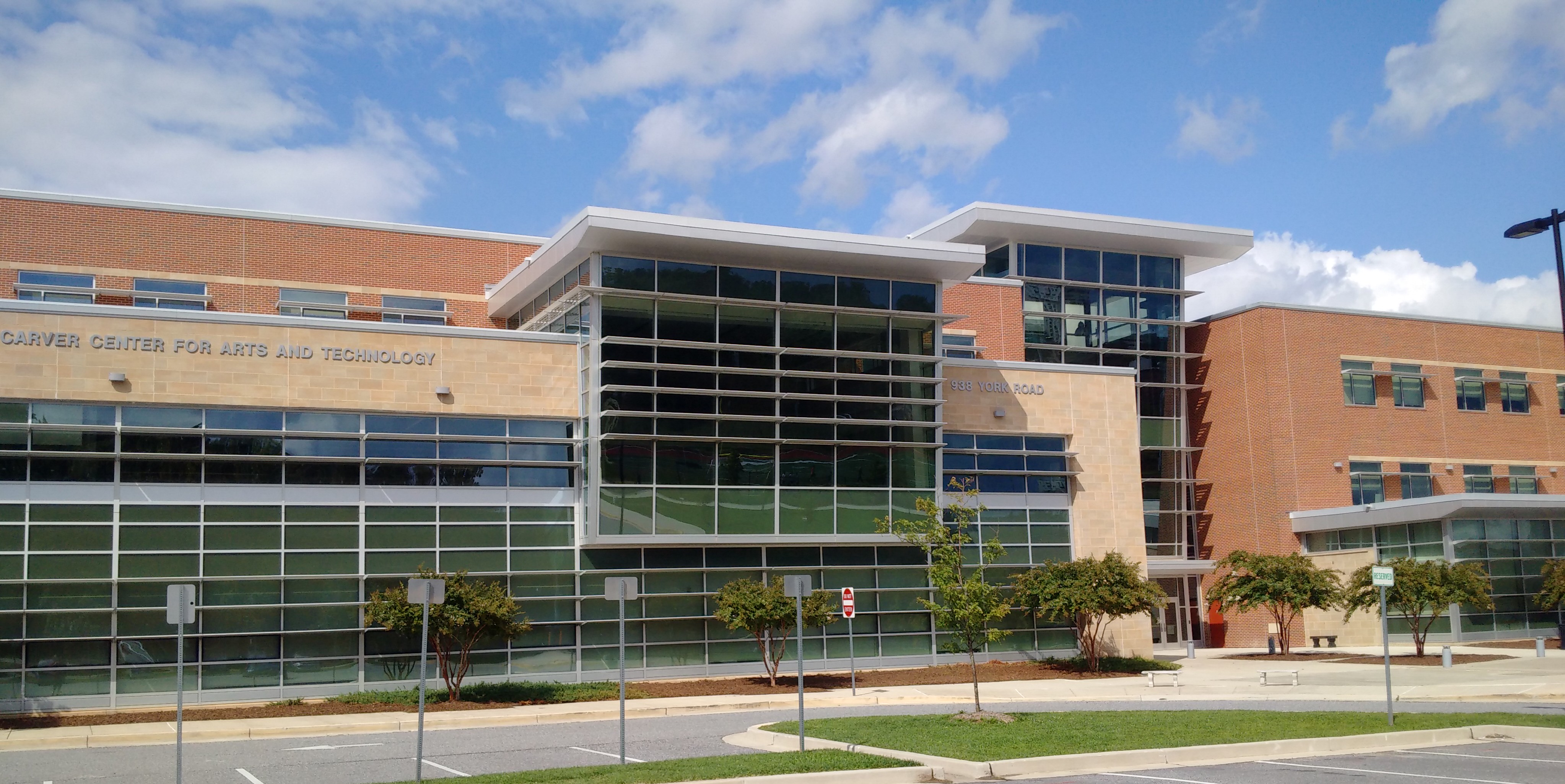

Location
- 938 York Road; Towson, Maryland 21204-2513; United States; 39°24′33″N 76°36′36″W

Information
- Type: Public magnet high school
- Motto: "Complecti Sententias Novas" ("Embracing New Ideas")
- Established: 1992
- School district: Baltimore County Public Schools, (BCPS)
- Superintendent: Dr. Myriam Rogers
- Principal: Erin O'Toole Trivas
- Teaching staff: 60.2 (FTE)
- Grades: 9–12 (freshmen, sophomores, juniors, seniors)
- Enrollment: 983 (2023–24)
- Student to teacher ratio: 15.96
- Hours in school day: 6 1/2
- Campus: Suburban
- Colors: Dark green, White, and Black
- Slogan: Carverized
- Mascot: "Wildcats"
- Team name: Carver Wildcats
- Newspaper: Catalyst
- Website: carverhs.bcps.org

George Washington Carver Center for Arts and Technology, also known just as the Carver Center is a Baltimore County-wide public magnet high school originally established in 1992 as one of three geographically spread technology high schools, (others established earlier in 1970 were Western and Eastern Technical High Schools - [original names]). The Central Technical High School, was located in Towson, the county seat in Baltimore County, Maryland, United States. In any given year, just under 1,000 students attend, and typical class size is just under 20. The high school is primarily known for its eleven "Primes", for which students must apply in order to be accepted to the school. The school is distinguished in many categories, mainly its many art achievements.

Students from all of the middle schools throughout Baltimore County, as well as those who were "homeschooled"Admission is based on a combination of an audition and a lottery.

== Name change and historical precedents ==
At the May, 2008, meeting of the Board of Education for the Baltimore County Public Schools, it was decided that upon next school year (2008-2009), The previously renamed "Carver Center for Arts and Technology" would become known as "George Washington Carver Center for Arts and Technology". This breaks the general policy of BCPS of not naming schools with the first names of people rather opting towards the previous example of using only last names such as in the example of Franklin High School (the County and BCoPS oldest public high school and a descendant of the historic old private Franklin Academy) in the Reisterstown area in the northwest Baltimore County or the current Carver Center.

However, upon examination of the history of the Carver Center, the board made the decision to change and use the full name in honor of the school's history as a previously racially segregated school for (then known as the "Colored" high school, later "Negro"), young African Americans and to continue to recognize not only the famous American George Washington Carver, (1864-1943), himself who was a scientist, writer, and artist, but also the esteem he was held in by Baltimore County's then under-recognized black citizens who chose to name their first openly attended public high school available to them to entitle their school with his name as the then "George Washington Carver High School". Therefore, his name is fitting to be continued on this High School, which is also dedicated to the arts and technology.

== Scheduling ==
The Carver Center employs block scheduling: periods are eighty minutes long, with four periods a day, and each class is held every other day (A-day and B-day alternate). The third period is divided into three thirty-minute lunch periods. There is also a 25-minute long "Wildcat Time" session each day between second and third periods, allowing students to meet with teachers for extra help, to redo assignments, or for other fun activities and meetings. Together with five minutes between every class, this means that GWCCAT's school day is slightly longer than that of the average high school.

The longer class periods allow students in classes like sculpture or carpentry more time to use materials in between getting them out and cleaning them up.

== Culture ==
The "Carver culture" focuses on respect, freedom of expression and individuality. Rules for students are less strict when compared to many area high schools. For example, Carver has a relaxed dress code, and student artwork, including nudes and the human figure, adorn the hallways. The GWCCAT student body tends to be highly motivated, competitive, disciplined, and cooperative.

== Primes ==
What makes Carver Arts and Technology unusual among Baltimore County public schools is its strong magnet system. Carver Center's magnet programs feature eleven specialty areas, or "Primes": literary arts, culinary arts, information technology/interactive media production, carpentry, cosmetology, dance, design and production, acting, vocal music, digital instrumental music, and visual arts (art such as painting, sculpture etc.). The visual arts prime is further divided into concentrations, including drawing and painting, multimedia, photography, sculpture, and telemedia.

The Digital Instrumental Music prime was added for the 2016–2017 school year. According to Carver's webpage, "the Digital Instrumental Music program prepares students for a broad range of professional activities in the music world."

The Information Technology/Interactive Media Production prime is currently evolving from the recently removed "business" and "business - information technology/programming" primes to include classes in the Adobe Creative Suite and a greater understanding of computer science and video game design in addition to developing programming skills.

The Culinary Arts Prime allows students to gain full access to food service experience. Through this program, students can are able to receive ServSafe certification and work in a student-run restaurant called "Carver Café." According to Carver Center's website, "The senior management project is an integral element of the instructional process allowing for the application of competencies through the operation of the Carver Café which is a licensed Baltimore County food service establishment that is maintained by the students and inspected by the local health department."

As of the 2007–2008 school year General Fine Arts/Multimedia/Digital Filmmaking (formerly known as Telemedia) will hold separate auditions under the Visual Arts prime. This provides for an opportunity for students interested in the areas of filmmaking and graphic design to come to Carver Center for these areas and use these mediums to create art. All Visual Arts students will still be encouraged to take classes in drawing, painting, sculpting, photography, etc.

As of the 2001–2002 school year "Theatre" and "Technical Theatre" were advanced to become the theatre primes of "Acting" and "Design & Production." This provided an opportunity for students interested in performance, design, theatre management and administration, technique, etc. to study these fields without the common stereotypes or restrictions of "actors" or "techies." During the 2005–2006 school year, "Vocal Music" was considered to be renamed "Singing" (but remains listed in the curriculum as "Vocal Music").

The Literary Arts Prime educates students on the many forms of writing. Literary students take mandatory courses that include the history of writing and the professional world of writing. Students also have the option to take electives in poetry, media writing, the yearbook, and fiction. During their senior year, students work on their “senior thesis,” which is a book students publish in the spring of their senior year. The prime is distinguished in their writing awards, especially in Scholastics Art & Writing, where they have claimed over half of the regional awards. Literary arts controls the production of Catalyst (the school paper), Synergy (the school literary magazine), and the school yearbook.

== Academics ==
George Washington Carver Center for Arts and Technology received a 71.8 out of a possible 90 points (79%) on the 2018-2019 Maryland State Department of Education Report Card and received a 5 out of 5 star rating, ranking in the 92nd percentile among all Maryland schools.

== Students ==
The 2019–2020 enrollment at The George Washington Carver Center for Arts and Technology was 961 students.

== Athletics ==
The following sports are available at Carver:

- Basketball
- Golf
- Volleyball
- Tennis
- Baseball
- Softball
- Soccer
- Lacrosse
- Field hockey
- Cross country
- Wrestling
- Indoor track
- Track and field
- Cheerleading
- Badminton

The school's mascot is the Wildcat; girls' teams are referred to as Lady Wildcats.

Girls softball

On May 9, 2023, the girls' varsity softball team won the 2023 Baltimore County softball championship, with a 6-5 win against the Eastern Tech Mavericks.

Girls soccer

The girls' varsity soccer team has been division champions for the past three years and came in second on the regional level.

Girls lacrosse

The girls' varsity lacrosse team has also been division champs the past three years.

Boys soccer

The boys' varsity soccer team had posted a 6–6 record in the fall of 2012, avoiding a losing record for the first time in decades.

Golf

The varsity golf team won an award for having the highest GPA of any of the fall sports teams in Baltimore County.

Cross country

Both Boys' and Girls’ Cross Country teams won the Region 1A Championships in 2023 and 2024. They were honored with the Al Smith Sportsmanship Award at the State Championship the same year. In 2025, Carver Center’s Maren Blanks won the title of Girls’ 1A State Champion, earning the first state title in Carver Center history.

Track and field

Carver has an Indoor Track Team, which competes during the winter season, and a spring Track and Field team. The Track and Field Teams boasts a number of competitive athletes who have gone on to compete at the collegiate level in the NCAA.

Carver's football team was disbanded in 1998, after a few unsuccessful years, partly due to low interest and partly because the old football field was one yard too short. When the new school building was opened in 2012, new fields were created, including a full-sized football field on athletic turf. Although Carver does not have a football team, it does hold an annual homecoming dance. The dance is run by the Student Government Association and is usually a fundraiser for the SGA.

=== State championships ===
The George Washington Carver Center for the Arts and Technology is the only high school in the Baltimore County Public Schools system that has never won a team State Championship in any sport.

== Other teams ==
Carver also has a Model United Nations program (currently led by Hugh Kearney) that participates in the Towson University-BCPS Model United Nations Conference, Johns Hopkins Model United Nations Conference, and Baltimore Area Model United Nations Conference. Within the past few years, the Model United Nations team has collected many awards from the Towson University Model UN Conference and Baltimore Area Model UN Conference. Students have also been accepted into application-based ad hoc committees at JHUMUNC. A new Mock Trial team (run by Sal Giordano, social studies' department chair)is slowly blossoming. Carver has a kinetic sculpture/engineering club, and an "It's Academic" TV quiz show team, which participates on local station WJZ-TV, Channel 13.In addition, CCAT's Future Business Leaders of America, FBLA-PBL Chapter has had multiple students qualify for the National Leadership Conference for the past six years.

The Culinary Arts Prime has also recently won the Statewide competition for ProStart and traveled to Nationals for the second year in a row.

The center also has a Vex Robotics team competing in all major competitions in the region.

== Construction ==
Carver students participate in the groundbreaking on September 15, 2009

In March, 2008, Baltimore County and the Baltimore County Public Schools approved a new building design for Carver. The design reflects the large number of program areas that are required to be located on the first floor while creating an efficient 3-story academic wing above that maximizes daylighting opportunities for the classroom areas and public spaces. The new structure was built on the former lacrosse and soccer fields, thereby permitting the old building to continue to be used during construction. Completed in August 2012, the school was built on a budget of $58.7 million and features an imposing "Central Space" bordered by the 1,000 seat Theater, the Black Box Theater, Gallery space and the Culinary Arts program and Café.

The new school building has an energy efficiency that exceeds industry standards by means of high efficiency equipment, high insulation thermal values, high shading coefficient glazing, solar shading devices and energy recovery features for both exhausted air and waste water. It has been given a "Silver LEED" award, denoting its "green" standard.

In August 2012, students began their first day in the new building.

Although it was anticipated that the original older school building would be demolished upon completion of construction — to utilize the vacated area for athletic fields for the new Carver — the decision became controversial due to school overcrowding in Baltimore County. Some School Board members argued that the need for additional classrooms required deferral of the old school's razing, while others said that having sufficient athletic fields was important for a high school to have. The old Carver school building was eventually torn down, each piece (from roofing to cement) being recycled.

== Recognitions ==
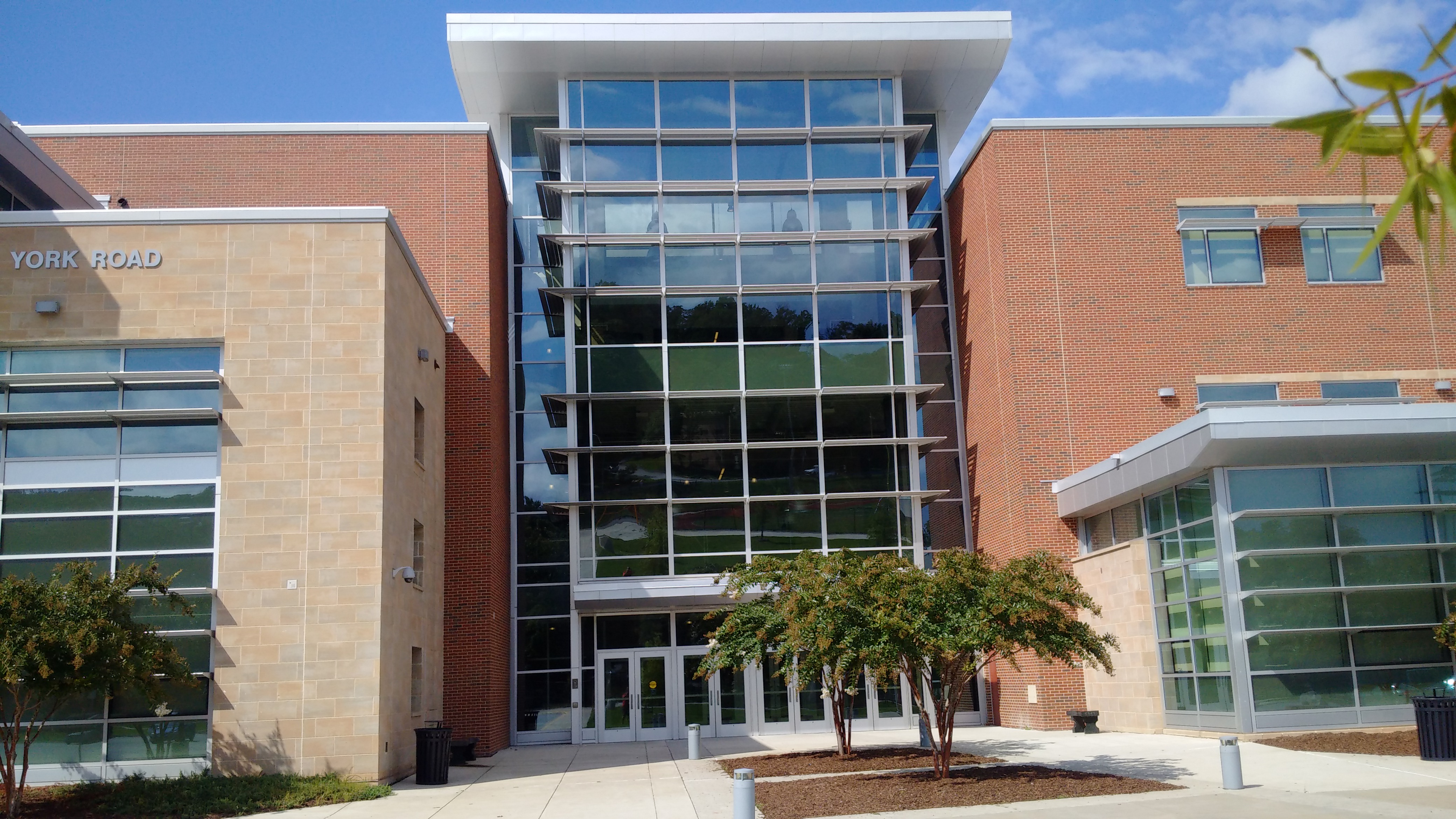
Main entrance

Carver is one of ten Maryland schools to receive the coveted Blue Ribbon School designation in 2016 from the U.S. Department of Education. The school has produced nine "Presidential Scholars" including: Andrew J. Cook in 2000, (also one of seven ARTS winners) in 2005, and Alex Levy (2008). Carver Center's arts award winners have also included 4 "Scholastics Gold Portfolio" winners, 116 "ARTS" winners (including 60 finalists), approximately 88 "Maryland Distinguished Scholar" finalists (including yearly the largest number of finalists in Maryland), and 22 "Marie Walsh Sharpe Scholars". Carver has produced numerous winners in the "Arts Recognition and Talent Search", a program of the National Foundation for Advancement in the Arts.

Five nominees for presidential scholars in 2009 were produced by Carver Center for A. & T. That was more than any other school in the country.

Carver's AP Studio Art program has been highly praised. In 2005 it was named as having the best studio arts program of any high schools its size in the world.

The interdisciplinary methods of the magnet arts and technology high school have also led to consistent student participation in the annual NAACP's "ACT-SO" (Afro-American Cultural and Technical Scientific Olympics) competitions. Students often qualify at the national level and have a strong showing in state competitions.

Theresa Shovlin, a painting and drawing teacher, has been nominated five times for the "Distinguished Teachers in the Arts" award, and won it once. Former photography teacher Carrol Cook, and former Visual Arts chair Joe Giordano were both nominated twice but neither ever won. In 2004 Carver not only had the most visual art entrants in the national art competition 'ARTS', (which is a national art competition for high school seniors who excel at Dance, Film & Video, Jazz, Music, Theater, Photography, Visual Arts, Voice, and Writing) but had the most entrants from any one school in the U.S.A. In 2007, more Carver students received awards in the NFAA competition than in any other year.

== Notable alumni ==
- Isaac Oliver, Author of Intimacy Idiot, humorist, writer for HBO's High Maintenance series, and a regular contributor to The New York Times.
- James Ransone (1997 Graduate), starred in HBO's The Wire, Generation Kill, the film Inside Man, the film Sinister, the film Ken Park, the film Broken City, and the HBO series Treme.
- Brittney Spencer (2007 Graduate), is a country music singer who has sung at the ACM Awards, CMA Awards, and the Grand Ole Opry. She has toured with Maren Morris, Willie Nelson, and Reba McEntire. She was nominated for a CMT award in 2022.
