= Isaac Oliver (writer) =

American dramatist, author and performer

- Education: Sarah Lawrence College; Carver Center for Arts and Technology; Fordham University
- Occupations: Playwright, author, performer
- Writing career
- Genres: Comedy, collection of stories
- Subject: Life
- Notable work: Intimacy Idiot (2015)
- Notable awards: New York Innovative Theatre
- Website: www.IsaacOliver.com

Isaac Oliver (born in Baltimore, Maryland) is an author, playwright and on-stage comic known for his debut humor collection.

== Early life and education ==
Oliver studied playwriting at Sarah Lawrence College and graduated from the Carver Center for Arts and Technology, which he later called "a magical place, a haven for weird, expressive kids who like to sob in stairwells." He was a 2013 MacDowell Colony fellow.

== Career ==
After college, Oliver moved to Manhattan, worked at a theatre box office and started a blog about his daily life, ultimately performing material from the blog for his friends. He then performed live at midtown theatre Ars Nova's variety-show gala Showgasm. New York magazine called Oliver "a monstrous new talent." He has written for HBO's High Maintenance, Netflix's GLOW, Prime Video's The Marvelous Mrs. Maisel, and Étoile. He has also been a frequent contributor to The New York Times.

After the release of Oliver's book Intimacy Idiot, writer Sarah Larson stated in The New Yorker that actor Jonathan Groff practiced each day for the musical Hamilton by reading a page from Intimacy Idiot in a King George accent.

In 2017, Oliver began performing in residence at Joe's Pub in The Public Theater, in a show titled Isaac Oliver Sits Down, directed by Jason Eagan.

In December 2017, he premiered a holiday special, "Isaac Oliver's Lonely Christmas", on the West Coast at the Diversionary Theatre in San Diego.

=== Book ===
Oliver's book Intimacy Idiot, released by Scribner in June 2015, is a collection of essays about dating, living, working, and being single in New York City, about which Kirkus Reviews Features, in an interview with the author, noted: "The material breathes with sharp honesty and boasts an assured authorial voice... ."

NPR named Intimacy Idiot one of its Best Books of 2015.

Stephan Lee in a book review for Entertainment Weekly, wrote: "Like any young memoirist worth reading, Oliver has mastered the art of self-deprecation." Kirkus Reviews described Oliver's writing as "in-your-face funny but with surprisingly moving moments", while Publishers Weekly observed: "His chatty style and candor about sex is entertaining."

In a feature article about Oliver, Metro, an international daily newspaper, called his book "a collection of essays, vignettes, poems, lists and diary entries that document the poignant, hilarious and awkward moments of intimacy between humans."

=== Awards ===
In 2020, Oliver was nominated for a Writers Guild Award for his episode "Trick" from the fourth season of High Maintenance. In 2011, Oliver took home a New York Innovative Theatre Award for Outstanding Original Short Script for his short play Come Here.

== Personal life ==
Oliver, who is homosexual, has said: "I'm very proud to be gay. I'm very thankful to be gay. If it were a choice, I'd choose it."
