= Thomas Douglas-Powell =

Australian volleyball player (born 1992)

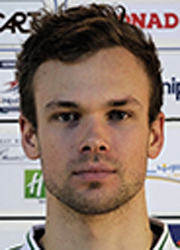
- Douglas-Powell in 2015

Personal information
- Full name: Thomas Ewen Douglas-Powell
- Nationality: Australian
- Born: 16 September 1992 (age 34)
- Height: 194 cm (6 ft 4 in)
- Weight: 90 kg (198 lb)
- Spike: 360 cm (142 in)
- Block: 335 cm (132 in)

Volleyball information
- Number: 16 (national team)

Career
- Years: Team
- 2013: University of Winnipeg

National team
- Years: Team
- 2013: Australia

Thomas Ewen Douglas-Powell (born 16 September 1992) is an Australian volleyball player. Tom first started playing volleyball at Brisbane Grammar School in 2005. In 2009 Tom accepted a scholarship at the Queensland Academy of Sport, and this led to his first Australian National Junior Team selection later that year. He was first invited to trial for the Volleyroos in 2013, and was selected to compete at the world FISU Games in Russia. After this, he was selected to be a part of the Volleyroos and was part of the team thatcompeted at the Asian Championships in Dubai, that won FIVB World League Group 2 in 2014, qualified for the second round of the 2014 World Championships, and played in the 2015 FIVB World League Elite 8. He also participated in the 2018 and 2021 VNL competitions. He is currently playing in Sporting Clube de Portugal, Portugal.

He is the brother of actress Emma Ishta.
