= Kyle Harris =

American actor (born 1986)

- Born: May 20, 1986 (age 40); Newport Beach, California, U.S.
- Education: University of Arizona
- Occupation: Actor
- Years active: 2007–present
- Known for: Stitchers; West Side Story
- Spouse: Stefanie Brown (m. 2019)
- Children: 1

Kyle Harris (born May 20, 1986) is an American actor. He has performed on Broadway and in television, and is best known for his role as Cameron Goodkin on the Freeform (formerly ABC Family) television series Stitchers.

== Life and career ==
Harris was born in Newport Beach, California. He attended Woodbridge High School in Irvine. He then attended the University of Arizona, obtaining a BFA in Musical Theatre.

== Filmography ==
Television roles
Year	Title	Role	Notes
2007	The Electric Sleep	Dr. Stone	Short film
2011	Submissions Only	Mike Dakin	Episode: "The Miller/Hennigan Act"
2012, 2016, 2019	High Maintenance	Mark	Episode: "Heidi", "Selfie", Blondie
2014	It Could Be Worse	Kyle	Miniseries; Episode: "So, We Meet Again"
2014	The Carrie Diaries	Seth	3 episodes
2014	Songbyrd	Nate	Episode: "Pilot"
2015	Beauty & the Beast	Russell Keaton	Episode: "Patient X"
2015	Octopus	Jake	Short film
2015–2017	Stitchers	Cameron Goodkin	Main role; 31 episodes
2017	The Blacklist: Redemption	Kevin Jensen	Episode: "Kevin Jensen"
2018–2019	Indoor Boys	Rusty	3 episodes
2018	Demons of Dorian Gunn	Trip Chapman	Pilot
2018	God Friended Me	Eli James	5 episodes
2021	Grey's Anatomy	Dr. Mason Post	Episode: "I'm Still Standing"
2021	Liza on Demand	Dave	Episode: "Hatumentary"
2022	Blue Bloods	Adam Reynolds	Episode: "Heroes"
2024	CSI: Vegas	Jim Vikner	Episode: "Heavy Metal"
2025	High Potential	Anson Pierce	Episode: "Partners"
2025	Elsbeth	Colin	Episode: "I've Got a Little List"
2026	Law & Order	Lucas Peters	Episode: "Accidentally Like a Martyr"

== Theater ==
Year	Title	Role	Notes	Ref.
2010	Sondheim on Sondheim	Understudy	Broadway	
2010–2011	West Side Story	Tony	Broadway Revival Tour	
2012	A Room with a View	George Emerson		
2014	Little Dancer	Christian	Kennedy Center	
2019	Marie, Dancing Still	Christian	5th Avenue Theatre	
2019-2020	The Inheritance	Jasper	Ethel Barrymore Theatre	

== Awards and nominations ==
Year	Award	Category	Nominated work	Result	Ref.
2017	Teen Choice Awards	Choice Summer TV Actor	Stitchers	Nominated	
2019	Indie Series Awards	Best Guest Actor – Comedy	Indoor Boys	Nominated	
