= Stitchers =

ABC television show

- Genre: Crime drama Science fiction
- Created by: Jeffrey Alan Schechter
- Starring: Emma Ishta; Kyle Harris; Ritesh Rajan; Salli Richardson-Whitfield; Allison Scagliotti; Damon Dayoub
- Composer: Kurt Farquhar
- Country of origin: United States
- Original language: English
- No. of seasons: 3
- No. of episodes: 31 (list of episodes)

Production
- Executive producers: Jeffrey Alan Schechter; Jonathan Baruch; Rob Wolken; Todd Holland; John Myrick; John Ziffren
- Producer: David Roessell
- Running time: 43 minutes
- Production companies: StoryBy Productions; Like The Wind Productions

Original release
- Network: Freeform
- Release: June 2, 2015 – August 14, 2017

Stitchers is an American science fiction crime drama television series created by Jeffrey Alan Schechter. The show was picked up to series on September 29, 2014, and premiered on June 2, 2015, on ABC Family (now Freeform). In an October 2016 Facebook Live chat, it was announced that the series was renewed for a third season, which aired from June 5 to August 14, 2017. On September 15, 2017, Freeform canceled the series after three seasons.

== Plot ==
Stitchers follows Kirsten Clark, who has been recruited into a government agency to be "stitched" into the memories of people recently deceased to investigate murders and mysteries that otherwise would have gone unsolved. Dr. Cameron Goodkin, a brilliant neuroscientist, assists Kirsten in the secret program headed by Maggie Baptiste, a skilled covert operator. The program also includes Linus Ahluwalia, a bioelectrical engineer and communications technician. Camille, Kirsten's roommate and a computer science grad student, is also recruited to assist Kirsten as a "stitcher". LAPD Detective Quincy Fisher is recruited and added to the team after crossing paths with Kirsten.

== Cast ==
=== Main ===
- Emma Ishta as Kirsten Clark, a Caltech student recruited to the secret Stitchers program. She was given a diagnosis of temporal dysplasia, a fictional condition in which a person could not sense the passing of time, at the age of eight after her father attempted to stitch her into her mother while she was still alive, resulting in the death of her mother and the loss of Kirsten's memories of her parents. This condition hinders her ability to form relationships as her lack of temporal perception hinders her emotional connection to others; as described by her when she witnessed her dead foster father, the moment she was told he was dead, it was like he had been dead forever. She eventually begins a relationship with Cameron in the third season.
- Kyle Harris as Cameron Goodkin, a brilliant neuroscientist who is part of the Stitchers program. He had heart valve surgery at a young age leading to his first meeting Kirsten. Born under the name Cameron Miller but took his mother's surname when his father was sent to prison for fraud. He dates a girl named Nina he met at a comic book store in the second season, but after he repeatedly interrupts their time together to assist the program, Nina breaks up with him. He subsequently begins a relationship with Kirsten in the third season. During the third season he is also promoted to interim head of the team when Maggie is required to be elsewhere after she is made head of the overall program.
- Ritesh Rajan as Linus Ahluwalia, a bioelectrical engineer and technical communications for the Stitchers program.
- Salli Richardson-Whitfield as Magritte "Maggie" Baptiste, a former CIA assassin and the leader of the Stitchers program. She develops a more removed approach after she becomes head of the program overall, requiring her to attend meetings in Washington and other matters on a more regular basis.
- Allison Scagliotti as Camille Engelson, roommate of Kirsten and talented graduate student of computer science. It was revealed that Maggie assigned her to keep an eye on Kirsten by paying off her student loans and living accommodation. She has been trained by Cameron to operate the equipment guiding Kirsten through the stitch in his absence. She and Linus had an on-off relationship for the first two seasons, but in the third season she begins dating the program's new medical examiner.
- Damon Dayoub as Detective Quincy Fisher (recurring, season 1; regular, seasons 2–3), an LAPD officer who is later recruited into the Stitchers program to act as their 'public face', essentially taking official credit for the arrests carried out based on the evidence acquired through stitching.

=== Recurring ===
- Hugo Armstrong as Ed Clark, Kirsten's non-biological father. He is found dead from unknown causes at the start of the series, set out in a manner that suggested suicide despite Kirsten's doubts, and left hints for Kirsten to figure out the truth about her condition.
- Tiffany Hines as Marta Rodriguez, a former member of the Stitchers Program who went into a coma after a stitch gone wrong. She later awakens and then sacrifices herself for Kirsten (season 1).
- Kaylee Quinn as Young Kirsten Clark
- Oded Fehr as Leslie Turner, the director of the Stitchers program (seasons 1–2).
- Sola Bamis as Dr. Ayo, head of the medical department at the Stitchers program.
- Ross Kurt Le as Alex, part of the Stitchers team and responsible for subject biology (or Sub-Bio).
- Cameron Britton as Tim, manager of engineering at Stitchers.
- Jack Turner as Liam Granger, Kirsten's ex-boyfriend. After Kirsten broke up with him, the team began to suspect that he was spying on her, prompting Maggie to arrange for Camille to pretend to date him to try to learn the truth. He was eventually killed by Daniel Stinger when he was about to tell Kirsten the truth.
- C. Thomas Howell as Daniel Stinger, Kirsten's biological father. He created the Stitchers technology and is now on the run as he tries to determine how to cure Kirsten's mother's condition, certain that the program is too dangerous for the government to be trusted with its full potential.
- John Billingsley as Mitchell Blair, Turner's superior who promotes Maggie as the new director of the Stitchers program (seasons 2–3).
- Jasmin Savoy Brown as Nina, Cameron's girlfriend (season 2). She worked at a comic book store and initially believed Cameron designed video games. He eventually admitted the truth to her when he had to constantly interrupt their dates and she found his NSA badge, but she broke up with him while the team were on lockdown in the lab when Kirsten became trapped in her own mind.
- Sarah Davenport as Ivy Brown, Kirsten's older half-sister (seasons 2–3). She is a computer science teacher at a school, and later assists the team in tracking suspects and cracking complex codes.
- Anna Akana as Amanda, Camille's love interest (season 3). She was the program's medical examiner, and also moonlights as a DJ at a local club.

== Episodes ==
Stitchers ran for three seasons. The first season was presented as a miniseries of eleven (ten plus one) episodes, which aired weekly from June 2, 2015 to August 4, 2015 for the first ten, plus a Halloween special "When Darkness Falls" on October 20, 2015.

Season	Episodes	Originally released	
Season	Episodes	First released	Last released
1	11	June 2, 2015	October 20, 2015
2	10	March 22, 2016	May 24, 2016
3	10	June 5, 2017	August 14, 2017

== Broadcast ==
Internationally, the series premiered in Australia on FOX8 on October 14, 2015 and in the United Kingdom, it premiered on SyFy on July 23, 2018, being shown daily Monday-Friday. Season 2 started the day after the end of Season 1. On September 15, 2017, Freeform canceled the series after three seasons.

== Reception ==
=== Critical reception ===
On the review aggregator website Rotten Tomatoes, the first season holds a rating of 25%, based on 16 reviews, with an average rating of 5.9/10. The site's critical consensus for Season 1 reads, "Confusing and tonally inconsistent, Stitchers is neither campy enough to be fun nor intelligent enough to be compelling." On Metacritic, the first season has a score of 48 out of 100, based on 10 critics, indicating "mixed or average reviews".

=== Accolades ===
Awards and nominations for Stitchers
Year	Award	Category	Nominee(s)	Result	Ref.
2016	Teen Choice Awards	Choice TV: Breakout Star	Emma Ishta	Nominated	
2016	Teen Choice Awards	Choice TV Breakout Show	Stitchers	Nominated	
2017	Teen Choice Awards	Choice Summer TV Star: Male	Kyle Harris	Nominated	
2018	Guild of Music Supervisors Awards	Best Song/Recording Created for Television	Allison Scagliotti, Heather Guibert, Dani Buncher, Scott Simons	Nominated	
