= Hayseed (2023 film) =

American film directed by Travis Burgess

- Official poster
- Directed by: Travis Burgess
- Written by: Travis Burgess
- Starring: Bill Sage; Ismenia Mendes
- Release date: 2023
- Country: United States
- Language: English

Hayseed is a 2023 American dark comedy, crime fiction feature film written and directed by Travis Burgess, and starring Bill Sage, Ismenia Mendes, Jack Falahee, Nolan North, Amy Hargreaves, and Kathryn Morris.

Hayseed is an American Bravado and DYNMC Films production, in association with Wishlist Productions, Shaman LP, and O Street. The film comes from first-time director Travis Burgess (previously co-producer on The Preppie Connection). It was produced by Michael Vincent Brown, Eric Cotti, Victor Lord, and Travis Burgess. J. Manuel, Octavius Prince, Bret Miller, Adam Bussell, and Ted Rhodes served as its executive producers. And Scott Lebowitz, Adrian Low, and Thomas Streed, its associate producers.

== Plot ==
After the shocking death of a small-town reverend, insurance investigator Leo Hobbins (Bill Sage) arrives at Emmaus Holy and interviews the church secretary, Darlene Halsey (Ismenia Mendes). She last saw the reverend alive on Saturday evening, preparing for a sunrise service, and discovered the reverend's body the following day, drowned under a 50-pound rock in the baptismal pool.

When Darlene has Hobbins alone, she confides that she pressed the insurance company to investigate—claiming it was an act of desperation after the local authorities refused to listen to her. She believes it was a murder. To complicate matters and potentially identify her as a suspect, Darlene was named the sole beneficiary of the reverend's insurance policy.

Against his better judgment and his employer's orders to avoid a payout, Hobbins agrees to help Darlene find the actual cause of the reverend's death. Hobbins interviews all the congregation members, sifting through a web of red herrings and self-serving lies, to solve the case overflowing with duplicity, greed, drugs, and corruption.

== Cast ==
- Bill Sage as Leo Hobbins
- Ismenia Mendes as Darlene Halsey
- Jack Falahee as Benjamin "Duck" McIlrath
- Nolan North as Don Fulcher
- Caitlin Carver as Cassandra
- Marta Piekarz as Willa Metts
- Kyle Jurassic as Trooper Kyle Gellis
- Eric Cotti as Lester Sederland
- Kyle Klaus as Curtis Metts
- Amy Hargreaves as Jane Fulcher
- Kathryn Morris as Joyce Metts

== Production ==
Principal photography of Hayseed occurred in Eaton Rapids, MI. It was photographed on the RED Komodo 6K camera using Atlas Orion anamorphic lenses and a 2:40:1 aspect ratio.

Deadline Hollywood article:

Kathryn Morris has signed on to the ensemble independent film Hayseed ... from first-time writer-director Travis Burgess. Michael V. Brown and Eric Cotti serve as producers. Set in a small town in Michigan, the film follows the investigation of a church congregation after their reverend is found dead.

== Release ==
The film had its World Premiere at the Derby Film Festival in Derbyshire, England. Hayseed played its US Premiere at the Another Hole In The Head Film Festival, a prestigious genre festival run by SF IndieFest in San Francisco, California.

== Recognition and accolades ==
In 2023, the cast was recognized by Hell's Half Mile Film & Music Festival with two nominations, including 'Best Ensemble' and 'Best Lead Performance'. At the Chain NYC Film Festival, Travis Burgess won the jury award for "Best Writer" for the film's screenplay.

On Saturday, April 15, 2023, Hayseed played its Michigan Premiere as the closing-night film of the Capital City Film Festival. After selling out a 250-seat theater, the festival added a simulcast screening, which also sold out. The Lansing State Journal said the film is "a neatly layered mystery, encased in small-town charm".

In August 2023, at the Macon Film Festival, Hayseed was again twice programmed, playing once at the historic Douglass Theatre and again at the Theatre Macon.

Before production, the script was recognized by several prominent festivals, including the Flickers: Rhode Island International Film Festival, which the script placed as an Award Finalist. Hayseed placed as a Semi-Finalist in the highly competitive Atlanta Film Festival screenplay competition. Out of 13,175 submissions, Hayseed placed in the top percent at the Austin Film Festival in the "Drama Feature" category in one of the US's toughest screenplay competitions.

== Distribution ==
In June 2023, the film was acquired by Good Deed Entertainment (who also distributed After Everything and American Folk) for worldwide distribution rights. Hayseed will play in select theaters and be released on video on demand in November 2023

== Reception ==
A review at Rogerebert.com described the film as "“Hayseed” is an amiable but fatally low-energy and over-complicated mystery that benefits from a droll, laid-back turn by veteran character actor (“American Psycho”) and occasional lead (“Evenhand”) Bill Sage". Another review, also mixed, stated, "On a smaller playing field with a far smaller budget and a mostly unknown cast, it doesn’t detract from the enjoyment Burgess has fashioned — an entertaining piece of filmmaking worth watching. Don’t expect to figure out who’s guilty…just go with the flow."
