= Jeffrey Alan Schechter =

American screenwriter

Jeffrey Alan Schechter (usually credited as Jeff Schechter) is a screenwriter whose work has been nominated for two Emmy awards, a Writers Guild of America award, and a Writers Guild of Canada award. His writing credits include Strange Days at Blake Holsey High, Overruled!, the Disney Channel original film Brink!, Bloodsport II: The Next Kumite and Dennis the Menace Strikes Again. In 2015, he created the ABC Family science fiction crime drama Stitchers.

== Early life and education ==
Schechter was born and raised in Brooklyn, New York, graduated from Edward R. Murrow High School and is a graduate from the film program at SUNY Purchase.

== Filmography ==
Year	Title	Credited as			Notes
Year	Title	Director	Producer	Writer	Notes
1996	Bloodsport II: The Next Kumite	No	No	Yes	
1998	Dennis the Menace Strikes Again	No	No	story	
2000	Beethoven's 3rd	No	No	Yes	
2004	Care Bears: Journey to Joke-a-lot	No	No	Yes	
2005	The Care Bears' Big Wish Movie	No	No	Yes	
2011	Breakaway	No	No	Yes	
2017	Undercover Grandpa	No	No	Yes	

=== Television ===
The numbers in directing and writing credits refer to the number of episodes.

Year	Title	Credited as				Notes
Year	Title	Creator	Director	Executive producer	Writer	Notes
1998	Brink!	—N/a	No	No	Yes	Television film
1999	Animorphs	No	No	No	Yes (1)	
1999	The Famous Jett Jackson	No	No	No	Yes (1)	
2000	The Other Me	—N/a	No	No	Yes	Television film
2001	The Tracker	—N/a	Yes	No	No	Television film
2003–05	Strange Days at Blake Holsey High	No	Yes (1)	No	Yes (9)	
2004–06	Martin Mystery	No	No	No	Yes (6)	
2005	Out of the Woods	—N/a	No	No	Yes	Television film
2005	Get Ed	No	No	No	Yes (2)	
2006	Totally Spies!	No	No	No	Yes (2)	
2006	Jane and the Dragon	No	No	No	Yes (1)	
2006	Erky Perky	No	No	No	Yes (unknown episodes)	
2006	Team Galaxy	No	No	No	Yes (unknown episodes)	
2007	Di-Gata Defenders	No	No	No	Yes (2)	
2008–09	Freefonix	No	No	No	Yes (5)	
2009	Overruled!	Yes	No	Yes	Yes (14)	
2013	Exploding Sun	—N/a	No	No	Yes	Television film
2013	The Hunters	—N/a	No	No	screenplay	Television film
2014	Transporter: The Series	No	No	No	Yes (2)	
2015	Stitchers	Yes	No	Yes	Yes (9)	
