= Katja Blichfeld =

American screenwriter

- Born: Long Beach, California, U.S.
- Occupations: Writer; director; producer; casting director
- Spouse: Ben Sinclair (m. 2010; div. 2016)

Katja Blichfeld (born 1979) is an American writer, director, producer and casting director. She is known for co-creating and directing High Maintenance, a Vimeo web series and HBO television series. She won a Primetime Emmy Award for Outstanding Casting on a Comedy Series for her work on 30 Rock.

== Early life and education ==
Blichfeld was born in Long Beach, California in 1979. She was raised as an evangelical Christian and attended Christian schools until graduating. Her parents are first-generation immigrants from Denmark, who moved to the United States in 1970.

Blichfeld was briefly enrolled in Long Beach City College before dropping out and moving to Chicago. In 2004, she moved to New York to pursue a career in casting.

== Career ==
When Blichfeld was nine years old she wrote, filmed, and starred in a short film about the dangers of marijuana.

In 2005, Blichfield began her casting career on Comedy Central's Roast of Jeff Foxworthy as an assistant. The next year, she worked as a casting associate on the mystery-thriller Freedomland. In 2010, she transitioned from film to TV by joining Jennifer McNamara as a casting director for NBC’s 30 Rock. She won an Emmy in 2013 and was nominated for two more in 2010 and 2011 for her work on 30 Rock.

Blichfeld is the co-creator and director of the Vimeo and HBO television series High Maintenance. Blichfeld and her co-creator, Ben Sinclair, initially started the show as a passion project. The pair were the sole writers for 18 of the 19 webisodes, which they produced for less than $1,000 apiece before it was picked up by HBO. Prior to meeting Sinclair, Blichfeld had never professionally written or directed.

== Personal life ==
In 2009, Blichfeld met aspiring actor Ben Sinclair at a barbecue in Los Angeles. They began writing together only days after becoming a couple and moved in together in the span of months. In 2010, the pair married. While on a bike ride across the Williamsburg Bridge in New York City, the couple devised the idea for High Maintenance. They launched the show together in 2012.

The couple separated in 2016 following Blichfeld's admission of infidelity with a woman. Their divorce was finalised prior to the commencement of season two of High Maintenance. The pair continued to collaborate on three more seasons of High Maintenance, until the 2021 announcement of the show's indefinite hiatus.

At 37, Blichfeld came out as a lesbian and began to openly date women.

Blichfeld has been open about her struggles with anxiety and depression. A few years into High Maintenance's production, Blichfeld sought therapy and began taking antidepressants. Following her coming out, Blichfeld’s struggles with anxiety began to subside. She no longer takes antidepressants, but still regularly goes to therapy.

== Filmography ==
Year	Title	Role	Media
2005	Comedy Central Roast of Jeff Foxworthy	Casting Assistant	TV Special
2006	Freedomland	Casting Associate	Movie
2007	Conviction	Casting Associate	TV Series
2008	Kath & Kim	Casting Coordinator	TV Series
2009	Warehouse 13	Casting Department	TV Episode
2010–2013	30 Rock	Casting Director	TV Series
2012–2020	High Maintenance	Creator, Writer, Director, Producer	Web Show/TV Series
2015	Nasty Baby	Casting Director	Movie

== Awards and nominations ==
At the 2010 Primetime Emmy Awards, Blichfeld was nominated alongside Jennifer McNamara for Outstanding Casting on a Comedy Series for their work on 30 Rock. They were nominated for the same award in 2011 before finally winning in the same category in 2013.

Blichfeld was awarded Stareable Fest's inaugural Creator Achievement Award in 2020 for creating High Maintenance.
