= Ismenia Mendes =

Portuguese actress

- Born: Porto, Portugal
- Education: Juilliard School (BFA)
- Occupation: Actor
- Notable work: Hayseed; High Maintenance

Ismenia Mendes is an actress born in Porto, Portugal and best known for such films, television series and theatre productions as Hayseed, High Maintenance and The Rover.

Mendes has also starred in such plays as Your Mother's Copy of the Kama Sutra.

Mendes was praised for her portrayal of Cressida in a 2016 adaptation of William Shakespeare's Troilus and Cressida. The Guardian said of her performance, "Cressida, played by Ismenia Mendes, is by turns coy, bullish, spontaneous and calculating, playing the early seduction scenes with a kind of nervous energy that could run untouched in an old episode of Gossip Girl. (I mean that as a compliment)."

== Education ==
Mendes was educated at the Juilliard School.
