= Emma Ishta =

Australian model and actress (born 1990)

- Born: Emma Ishta Douglas-Powell; 16 November 1990 (age 36); Brookfield, Queensland, Australia
- Occupations: Model; Actress
- Years active: 2003–present (model); 2014–present (actress)
- Spouse: Daniel McCabe (m. 2012)
- Children: 1
- Modeling information
- Agency: IMG Models (New York, Paris, Milan, Los Angeles, Sydney)

Emma Ishta Douglas-Powell (born 16 November 1990) is an Australian model and actress. She is best known for portraying Kirsten Clark on the Freeform drama series Stitchers.

== Early life ==
Emma Ishta was born in Brookfield, Queensland, Australia. She has a younger brother, Thomas Douglas-Powell, who is a professional volleyball player.

Ishta was educated at St Aidan's Anglican Girls' School in Corinda, Brisbane, Queensland. She was later accepted into the music program at Queensland University of Technology but deferred her studies to pursue modeling.

== Career ==
Emma Ishta began modeling around age 13. She started working with IMG Models at 15 and relocated to New York in 2009.

In 2014, Ishta began to venture into acting, landing guest roles on Black Box, Power, and Manhattan Love Story. She starred in her first film, I Smile Back, in 2015.

In May 2014, it was announced that Ishta had been cast in the lead role of Kirsten Clark in the American TV series Stitchers. The Freeform series premiered on 2 June 2015. In September 2017, it was announced that the series had been canceled after three seasons.

== Personal life ==
On September 8, 2012, Emma Ishta married New York native and playwright Daniel James McCabe. They both starred in his play The Flood, which premiered at the 2014 New York International Fringe Festival and won the Award for Excellence in Playwriting. Through this marriage, she has one stepdaughter. On June 16, 2016, the couple welcomed their first child together, a son.

== Filmography ==
=== Film ===
Year	Title	Role	Notes
2015	I Smile Back	Katrina	
2019	Shadow Puppet	Leda	Short film; also executive producer
2019	Crown Vic	Ally	
2023	Mr. Monk's Last Case: A Monk Movie	Gayle	
2026	Conspiracy of Thieves		

=== Television ===
Year	Title	Role	Notes
2014	Black Box	Cara	Episode: "Kodachrome"
2014	Power	Bella	Episode: "This Is Real"
2014	Manhattan Love Story	Catharine	Episode: "Pilot"
2015–2017	Stitchers	Kirsten Clark	Main role; 31 episodes
2018	The Good Cop	Belinda Mannix	Episode: "What Is the Supermodel's Secret?"
2019	Blue Bloods	Mindy Kaye	Episode: "Behind the Smile"
2020; 2022-2023	Chicago Med	Michelle Abrams	Guest role; 4 episodes
2021	FBI	Nicole Wyatt	Episode: "All That Glitters"
2025	The Summer I Turned Pretty	Kayleigh	Guest role; 2 episodes

=== Producer ===
Year	Title	Notes
2018	The Separatists	Short film
