= High Maintenance =

American television series

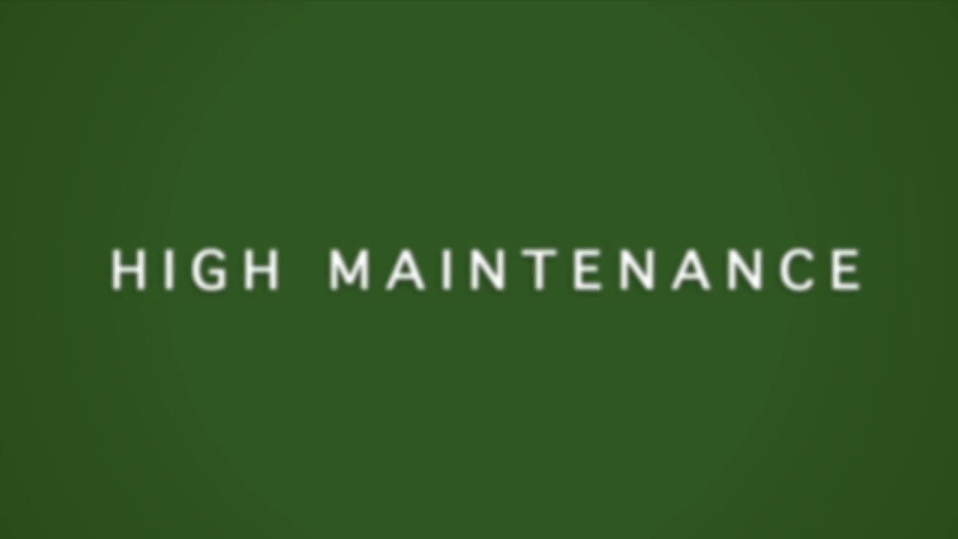
- Web series title card
- Genre: Comedy drama; Anthology; Slice of life
- Created by: Katja Blichfeld; Ben Sinclair
- Starring: Ben Sinclair
- Country of origin: United States
- Original language: English
- No. of seasons: 6 (Vimeo); 4 (HBO)
- No. of episodes: 19 (Vimeo); 34 (HBO)

Production
- Executive producers: Katja Blichfeld; Ben Sinclair; Russell Gregory
- Production location: New York
- Production company: Janky Clown Productions

Original release
- Network: Vimeo
- Release: November 9, 2012 – February 5, 2015
- Network: HBO
- Release: September 16, 2016 – April 3, 2020

High Maintenance is an American anthology comedy-drama television and web series created by ex-husband and wife team Ben Sinclair and Katja Blichfeld. The show follows The Guy, a cannabis courier (played by Sinclair), as he delivers his product to clients in the New York City borough of Brooklyn. Each episode focuses on different characters as their lives intersect with The Guy. The full series consists of six web series followed by four television seasons, released from November 2012 to April 2020.

High Maintenance originally premiered as a web series on Vimeo on November 11, 2012, and began airing as a television series on HBO on September 16, 2016. The show's second HBO season premiered on January 19, 2018, and its third on January 20, 2019. HBO renewed the series for a fourth season, which premiered on February 7, 2020. On January 14, 2021, it was confirmed that the series would not return for a fifth season.

High Maintenance has received critical acclaim for its portrayals of boredom, loneliness, and the human condition. First season episodes "Meth(od)" and "Grandpa" both placed on numerous year-end lists in 2016, while second season episode "Globo" was ranked as one of the best episodes of 2018 by sources such as Time and Variety.

== Structure ==
Largely lacking serial plotlines, the show consists of vignettes in the lives of various New Yorkers as they come into direct or indirect contact with The Guy. The web series was shot throughout various neighborhoods in Brooklyn and occasionally Manhattan and Queens, and its episodes range from 5 to 20 minutes in length. "Freed of the constraints of thirty-minute or one-hour formulas, the episodes are luxurious and twisty and humane, radiating new ideas about storytelling," wrote television critic Emily Nussbaum in an article for The New Yorker.

When the series moved to HBO, its episodes expanded to the half-hour format. The television version continued the practice of on-location photography.

== Cast ==
=== Main ===
- Ben Sinclair as "The Guy", a marijuana delivery courier. His real name, "Rufus", is revealed in the final episode.

=== Recurring ===
- Yael Stone as Beth (seasons 1–2), one of The Guy's customers and budding romantic partner, a quirky, mushroom-dealing Australian who lives in Bushwick.
- Dan Stevens (seasons 1–2, 4) as Colin, a cross-dressing screenwriter. Stevens appeared in the web series episode "Rachel" and three episodes of the HBO series.
- Katja Blichfeld as Becky (seasons 1–2, 4), the wife of Colin.
- Rebecca Naomi Jones as Gwen (seasons 1–2), his ex-wife's new partner.
- Miriam Shor as Renee (seasons 1–2), a bohemian woman with a difficult relationship with her daughter.
- Amy Ryan as Gigi (seasons 1 and 3), a film producer.
- Michael Cyril Creighton as Patrick (seasons 1 and 3), a lonely agoraphobic obsessed with Helen Hunt and secretly in love with The Guy.
- Max Jenkins and Heléne Yorke appear as Max and Lainey (seasons 1 and 4), a pair of loathsome "Assholes" from the fashion world.
- Greta Lee as Heidi (seasons 1–2), a customer of The Guy.
- Kate Lyn Sheil as Jules (seasons 2–3), The Guy's ex-wife who he remains friends with.
- Abdullah Saeed as Abdullah (seasons 2–3), a temporary partner to The Guy.
- Britt Lower as Lee (season 3), a love interest for The Guy.
- Ken Leung as Gene (seasons 3–4), a depressed veterinarian.

=== Notable guests ===
- Christopher Caldwell as Darnell, a recovering addict ("Meth(od)")
- Lee Tergesen as Leo ("Museebat")
- Gaby Hoffmann as herself, a yoga practitioner and attendee of the day rave ("Tick")
- Hannibal Buress as himself ("Selfie")
- Brett Gelman as himself ("Selfie")
- Lena Dunham as herself, filming an episode of Girls ("Selfie")
- Ismenia Mendes as Anja ("Selfie")
- Danielle Brooks as Regine, a realtor ("Namaste")
- Jessica Hecht as Laurie ("Ghost")
- John Gallagher Jr. as Zach ("Steve")
- Temple Grandin as herself in a cameo ("Craig")
- Annie Golden as Barbie ("Blondie")
- Margaret Cho as Doc Lee ("Payday")
- Rosie Perez and Guillermo Díaz as Adriana and Arturo, wife and husband ("Proxy")
- Reed Birney as Leonard ("Cruise")
- Theo Stockman as Thomas ("Elijah")
- Ira Glass as himself, the host and producer of This American Life ("Cycles)"
- Nick Kroll as himself ("Trick")
- Rebecca Hall as herself ("Trick")
- Martha Stewart as herself ("Hand")

== Series overview ==
=== Web series ===
Season	Episodes	Originally released		
Season	Episodes	First released	Last released	Network
1	3	November 9, 2012		Vimeo
2	4	January 17, 2013	February 20, 2013	Vimeo
3	3	April 20, 2013		Vimeo
4	3	November 28, 2013	March 28, 2014	Vimeo
5	3	November 11, 2014		Vimeo
6	3	February 5, 2015		Vimeo

=== Television series ===
Season	Episodes	Originally released		
Season	Episodes	First released	Last released	Network
1	6	September 16, 2016	October 21, 2016	HBO
2	10	January 19, 2018	March 23, 2018	HBO
3	9	January 20, 2019	March 17, 2019	HBO
4	9	February 7, 2020	April 3, 2020	HBO

== Web series episodes ==
=== Cycle 1 (2012) ===
No. overall	No. in season	Title	Directed by	Written by	Original release date
1	1	"Stevie"	Sarah-Violet Bliss	Katja Blichfeld & Ben Sinclair	November 9, 2012
The Guy starts things off on the wrong foot when he visits the hotel room of a woman with clinical anxiety and a very impatient boss. Introduces Quinn.
2	2	"Heidi"	Katja Blichfeld & Ben Sinclair	Katja Blichfeld & Ben Sinclair	November 9, 2012
Heidi and Mark are an adorable new couple, and everything seems perfect until they call The Guy for marijuana delivery. Introduces Heidi and Mark.
3	3	"Jamie"	Thomas DeNapoli	Katja Blichfeld & Ben Sinclair	November 9, 2012
The Guy meets Jamie when he delivers to a pair of women who are upset due to having a mouse in their apartment. Introduces Molly, Brenna, and Pinky.

=== Cycle 2 (2013) ===
No. overall	No. in season	Title	Directed by	Written by	Original release date
4	1	"Olivia"	Katja Blichfeld & Ben Sinclair	Katja Blichfeld & Ben Sinclair	January 17, 2013
The Guy reluctantly delivers to a man and woman listed in his phonebook as "Assholes" and who have an artist friend named Olivia. Introduces Max and Lainey.
5	2	"Helen"	Katja Blichfeld	Michael Cyril Creighton	January 17, 2013
The Guy delivers to an agoraphobic man living with his invalid mother. Introduces Patrick, who is obsessed with Helen Hunt.
6	3	"Trixie"	Katja Blichfeld & Ben Sinclair	Katja Blichfeld & Ben Sinclair	January 17, 2013
The Guy hears a story about Trixie when he delivers to a couple who are stressed out because of their inconsiderate AirBnB guests. Introduces Candace, John, Saul.
7	4	"Dinah"	Katja Blichfeld & Ben Sinclair	Katja Blichfeld & Ben Sinclair	February 20, 2013
A couple's relationship is stressed by the overstay of their house guest, an old friend who's in town for Dinah's wedding. Meanwhile, The Guy catches them at an awkward time after delivering to an asexual magician. Introduces Evan, Kabir, Chad.

=== Cycle 3 (2013) ===
No. overall	No. in season	Title	Directed by	Written by	Original release date
8	1	"Jonathan"	Katja Blichfeld & Ben Sinclair	Katja Blichfeld & Ben Sinclair	April 20, 2013
Hannibal Buress stars as himself, a stand-up comic trying to get over a traumatic experience, and The Guy tries to cheer him up. Meanwhile, Heidi returns for a cameo role, discussing Jonathan Ames with Hannibal's artist girlfriend, Olivia. Introduces Hannibal, features Heidi.
9	2	"Elijah"	Katja Blichfeld & Ben Sinclair	Katja Blichfeld & Ben Sinclair	April 20, 2013
A private chef is hired to serve a Passover Seder dinner, and one of the family members happens to be the asexual magician. The chef calls The Guy for delivery, and he arrives just in time to learn about Elijah. Features Evan.
10	3	"Brad Pitts"	Katja Blichfeld & Ben Sinclair	Katja Blichfeld & Ben Sinclair	April 20, 2013
An uptight woman discusses Brad Pitts with her bird-watching friend who she discovers is very ill. She suggests that they smoke marijuana together to help with her friend's low appetite. Meanwhile, The Guy gets high with a pair of professional stoners. Introduces Helen, Abdullah. Features Saul.

=== Cycle 4 (2013–14) ===
No. overall	No. in season	Title	Directed by	Written by	Original release date
11	1	"Qasim"	Katja Blichfeld & Ben Sinclair	Katja Blichfeld & Ben Sinclair	November 28, 2013
One of The Guy's customers start dating a fitness buff. She soon learns about his very alternative lifestyle and about Qasim. Meanwhile, The Guy dresses as himself for Halloween.
12	2	"Matilda"	Katja Blichfeld & Ben Sinclair	Katja Blichfeld & Ben Sinclair	February 4, 2014
For the first time, The Guy is the central character. He struggles to entertain his teen-aged niece who is visiting from out of town. He doesn't want to conduct business in front of her, but when their plans to see "Matilda" get complicated, one of his customers offers to help out. Featuring cameos characters from the "Jamie" and "Olivia" episode.
13	3	"Rachel"	Katja Blichfeld & Ben Sinclair	Katja Blichfeld & Ben Sinclair	March 28, 2014
A cross-dressing author struggles with writer's block, which puts a strain on his marriage. Meanwhile, The Guy makes a delivery to him and is introduced to Rachel. Featuring cameos from characters from the "Trixie" and "Olivia" episodes.

=== Cycle 5 (2014) ===
No. overall	No. in season	Title	Directed by	Written by	Original release date
14	1	"Ruth"	Katja Blichfeld & Ben Sinclair	Katja Blichfeld & Ben Sinclair	November 11, 2014
The Guy sets up Ellen with Victor.
15	2	"Geiger"	Katja Blichfeld & Ben Sinclair	Katja Blichfeld & Ben Sinclair	November 11, 2014
A neurotic couple, Andrew & Lucy, explore ways to deal with existential anxieties, but just end up creating more. The Guy attempts to relate to an ASMR YouTuber.
16	3	"Genghis"	Katja Blichfeld & Ben Sinclair	Katja Blichfeld & Ben Sinclair	November 11, 2014
The asexual magician tries to find purpose by ditching his 9-5 and becoming a teacher.

=== Cycle 6 (2015) ===
No. overall	No. in season	Title	Directed by	Written by	Original release date
17	1	"Sufjan"	Katja Blichfeld & Ben Sinclair	Katja Blichfeld & Ben Sinclair	February 5, 2015
A couple move to a seemingly ideal suburb (Ditmas Park) but their distance from work and friends begins to drive them insane. The Guy helps save a kid from diabetic shock.
18	2	"Esme"	Katja Blichfeld & Ben Sinclair	Katja Blichfeld & Ben Sinclair	February 5, 2015
Orly - rival pot dealer from the "Canna-bitches" collective - auditions for a stomp team. The Guy plays shabbos goy for a Hasidic family and later encounters Orly at a client's apartment.
19	3	"Sabrina"	Katja Blichfeld & Ben Sinclair	Katja Blichfeld & Ben Sinclair	February 5, 2015
The Guy spends multiple days hanging out with a group of friends he isn't a part of. They take shrooms together.

== Television series episodes ==
=== Season 1 (2016) ===
No. overall	No. in season	Title	Directed by	Written by	Original release date	U.S. viewers (millions)
1	1	"Meth(od)"	Katja Blichfeld & Ben Sinclair	Katja Blichfeld & Ben Sinclair	September 16, 2016	0.399
The Guy makes an uncomfortable delivery to a macho client and his taciturn friend. Best friends Max and Lainey's co-dependent relationship begins to wane after Max accidentally stumbles upon a new group of friends, but in order to stay part of this group, Max must keep up a charade while keeping Lainey's suspicions at bay.
2	2	"Museebat"	Katja Blichfeld & Ben Sinclair	Katja Blichfeld & Ben Sinclair	September 23, 2016	0.392
Eesha, a young girl living with her aunt and uncle in Brooklyn, struggles to be a 'normal college student' despite her family's stringent religious values. The Guy delivers to Leo and Gigi, a seemingly boring couple throwing an intimate gathering for Leo's birthday - an event marked by accusations, recriminations, and a troubling revelation.
3	3	"Grandpa"	Katja Blichfeld & Ben Sinclair	Katja Blichfeld & Ben Sinclair	September 30, 2016	0.390
When Chase and his sensitive yet fun-loving dog Gatsby move from the suburban Midwest to Queens, culture shock takes its toll - until they cross paths with Beth, a cute, whimsical dog walker.
4	4	"Tick"	Katja Blichfeld & Ben Sinclair	Katja Blichfeld & Ben Sinclair	October 7, 2016	0.435
Aging parents Joon and Wei navigate their son's recent success and new lifestyle. The Guy delivers to Jim, a retired, former workaholic living downstairs from his neurotic daughter Quinn, her husband and baby.
5	5	"Selfie"	Katja Blichfeld & Ben Sinclair	Katja Blichfeld & Ben Sinclair	October 14, 2016	0.487
Anja, a twentysomething aspiring writer who spends most of her time on social media, convinces The Guy to sit down for a one-on-one interview, but her social media addiction threatens to blow up the story. Former customer Heidi enlists The Guy's help when she finds herself confronted by her past.
6	6	"Ex"	Katja Blichfeld & Ben Sinclair	Katja Blichfeld & Ben Sinclair	October 21, 2016	0.262
The Guy pays a visit to a longtime customer, Patrick, who happens to be agoraphobic. Later on, The Guy seeks refuge in a friend's apartment after a rough night.

=== Season 2 (2018) ===
No. overall	No. in season	Title	Directed by	Written by	Original release date	U.S. viewers (millions)
7	1	"Globo"	Katja Blichfeld & Ben Sinclair	Katja Blichfeld & Ben Sinclair	January 19, 2018	0.439
The Guy has a busier-than-usual day as New Yorkers react to world-changing news; a client's roommate struggles to maintain his commitment to losing weight.
8	2	"Fagin"	Katja Blichfeld & Ben Sinclair	Rebecca Drysdale & Isaac Oliver and Katja Blichfeld & Ben Sinclair	January 26, 2018	0.439
A couple visiting their daughter in Bushwick embrace the urban surroundings while dealing with a less-than-ideal rental complete with an unwelcome roommate; the Guy delivers to Brenna and Molly's all-female, politically minded gathering.
9	3	"Namaste"	Shaka King	Hannah Bos & Paul Thureen & Shaka King	February 2, 2018	0.450
An industrious Brooklyn real estate agent endeavors to hustle her way to a new home; Candace and John face culture shock and notice a class divide when they move in to their new apartment; the Guy considers his living situation.
10	4	"Derech"	Shaka King	Ben Sinclair	February 9, 2018	0.415
An ex-Hasidic man explores the world outside his sect as he connects with a writer who might have ulterior motives; a nightclub performer's night out takes an unexpected turn; the Guy bonds with a driver when he finds himself in need of a lift.
11	5	"Scromple"	Katja Blichfeld & Ben Sinclair	Katja Blichfeld & Rebecca Drysdale	February 16, 2018	0.427
The Guy gets into a bicycle accident and breaks his arm, confining him to a hospital bed; a freelance brand strategist struggling with her latest assignment embarks on a desperate search for a weed fix. The brand strategist, who is the Guy's ex-wife, visits him in the hospital.
12	6	"Googie"	Katja Blichfeld & Ben Sinclair	Katja Blichfeld & Ben Sinclair	February 23, 2018	N/A
Abdullah, a potential partner, takes over the Guy's weed route while he recovers from his accident.
13	7	"HBD"	Eliza Hittman	Katja Blichfeld	March 2, 2018	N/A
Emily, an artistic teen, has her birthday spotlight stolen by her bohemian mother, her uninhibited friends and a delivery from the Guy; only her mother's European friend gives Emily the attention she craves.
14	8	"Ghost"	Eliza Hittman	Eliza Hittman & Eric Slovin	March 9, 2018	N/A
A man turns to the Guy to get a prescription for his high-strung wife, not to mention something for their underwhelming sex life; the Guy gets more than he bargained for when he tries to help out an elderly man.
15	9	"#goalz"	Katja Blichfeld & Ben Sinclair	Katja Blichfeld & Ben Sinclair	March 16, 2018	N/A
A computer programmer tries out a tech-free night per the Guy's advice; a comic's controversial tweet draws the attention of Internet trolls; a fearless dancer attempting to match a world record struggles as her dance partners fall by the wayside.
16	10	"Steve"	Katja Blichfeld & Ben Sinclair	Katja Blichfeld & Ben Sinclair	March 23, 2018	N/A
On the day of an eclipse, two couples head to the park and make new friends in the process; the Guy says some goodbyes and attempts to make a few life changes.

=== Season 3 (2019) ===
No. overall	No. in season	Title	Directed by	Written by	Original release date	U.S. viewers (millions)
17	1	"M.A.S.H."	Katja Blichfeld	Katja Blichfeld & Ben Sinclair	January 20, 2019	0.206
In Poughkeepsie, The Guy meets a new lover. A woman struggles with the death of her roommate and friend.
18	2	"Craig"	Ben Sinclair	Isaac Oliver & Zack Schamberg	January 27, 2019	0.243
The Guy delivers to a narcoleptic nurse, who gets addicted to Craigslist. A woman seeks to alienate and bewilder strangers.
19	3	"Blondie"	Katja Blichfeld	Story by : Katja Blichfeld; Teleplay by : Isaac Oliver & Zack Schamberg	February 1, 2019 (online); February 3, 2019 (HBO)	0.285
A boy helps his mother at work on a day off from school. A longtime New Yorker loses her old place and becomes roommates with a nudist.
20	4	"Breathwork"	Ben Sinclair	Katja Blichfeld & Ben Sinclair	February 10, 2019	0.189
The Guy delivers to a film set. Lee can't escape her past.
21	5	"Payday"	Katja Blichfeld	Mitra Jouhari & Mel Shimkovitz	February 17, 2019	0.204
A BDSM-inclined couple decide to start trading sexual experiences for money in their relationship. Two married summer school teachers start an affair. The Guy delivers to Japanese tourists and decides to accept money by Venmo.
22	6	"Fingerbutt"	Chioke Nassor	Katja Blichfeld & Ben Sinclair	February 24, 2019	0.174
A woman in her seventies feels her age during a modeling job. A veterinarian tries microdosing magic mushrooms to cope with depression, but it hurts his ability to work.
23	7	"Dongle"	Silas Howard	Mitra Jouhari & Zack Schamberg & Mel Shimkovitz	March 3, 2019	0.242
On the Fourth of July, the Guy and Lee attend a party on a boat with their exes. A Latino construction worker develops a crush on a bodega worker. A young girl helps with her family's celebration.
24	8	"Proxy"	Chioke Nassor	Ben Sinclair & William Meny	March 10, 2019	0.268
A married couple order a reborn doll to cope with the loss of their baby. An aspiring dancer comes into conflict with one of the children she nannies.
25	9	"Cruise"	Ben Sinclair	Ben Sinclair	March 17, 2019	0.232
An acting teacher contemplates moving back to New York. The Guy catches up with two friends from high school visiting the city.

=== Season 4 (2020) ===
No. overall	No. in season	Title	Directed by	Written by	Original release date	U.S. viewers (millions)
26	1	"Cycles"	Ben Sinclair	Ben Sinclair	February 7, 2020	0.276
A radio producer fights with her boyfriend while attempting to document a story. A telegram singer for-hire has a long day at work. The Guy finds a stray dog and keeps her.
27	2	"Trick"	Katja Blichfeld	Isaac Oliver	February 14, 2020	0.239
A man hires an inexperienced escort to keep him company for a night. An intimacy coordinator goes on a date with an asexual magician.
28	3	"Voir Dire"	Katja Blichfeld	Katja Blichfeld & Adele Thibodeaux	February 21, 2020	0.194
Two jurors encounter trouble after celebrating the end of their civic duty with karaoke. A young woman working at a fetish party runs into a man who used to date her mom.
29	4	"Backflash"	Katja Blichfeld	Zack Schamberg & Mel Shimkovitz	February 28, 2020	0.274
Two sisters clean out their childhood home in Staten Island after the death of their mother. A bickering couple renegotiates their relationship. A new mother hosts her cousin from out of town.
30	5	"Screen"	Ben Sinclair	Gary Richardson & Ben Sinclair	March 6, 2020	0.224
A teenager helps coax his shy, sneakerhead cousin out of his shell. The Guy attends a dinner party hosted by an old friend.
31	6	"Adelante"	Ben Sinclair	Lorelei Ramirez & Ben Sinclair	March 13, 2020	0.278
Max and Lainey, now estranged, share an uncomfortable Lyft ride. The Guy helps a blind man during his own Lyft ride. A busy dental hygienist goes on a date with one of her patients, and a Lyft driver asks to buy her panties.
32	7	"Hand"	Ben Sinclair	Isaac Oliver & Zack Schamberg	March 20, 2020	0.166
An on-site ASL interpreter lands a hand-modeling job at a photoshoot. A man helps his online shopping-addicted partner recover from a stroke, while she's hiding a secret.
33	8	"Solo"	Ben Sinclair	Mel Shimkovitz & Ben Sinclair	March 27, 2020	0.119
A puppeteer has an incident at his apartment that brings back a repressed memory. Due to a wrong text, a lonely man spends a night with his ex's assistant
34	9	"Soup"	Katja Blichfeld	Katja Blichfeld & Isaac Oliver and Katja Blichfeld & Ben Sinclair	April 3, 2020	0.243
A snow storm hits on Christmas Eve. The Guy's flight back home is cancelled so he celebrates Hanukah with a family member. A woman stays in Queens with her flight attendant sister after their flight is cancelled.

== Production ==
Sinclair said that the TV shows Six Feet Under and Party Down were inspirations for the web series. Each episode cost less than $1,000 to make.

In June 2014, Vimeo announced that the website would provide financial backing for upcoming episodes of original programming via their Vimeo on Demand platform. Vimeo funded six episodes of High Maintenance before the series was picked up by HBO. Three episodes were released November 11, 2014, and the remaining three on February 5, 2015.

== Critical response ==
Critical response has been positive. For the first season, review aggregator website Rotten Tomatoes reported a 95% approval rating with an average rating of 8.2/10, based on 42 critic reviews. The website's critics consensus reads, "Dreamlike, poignant, and often funny, High Maintenance successfully transitions from the web to the small screen thanks to sharp writing and an excellent cast." Metacritic, which uses a weighted average, assigned a score of 81 out of 100 based on 20 critics, indicating "universal acclaim". For the second season, Rotten Tomatoes reported a 100% approval rating with an average rating of 9/10, based on 22 critic reviews. The website's critics consensus reads, "High Maintenance's silly premise turns surprisingly insightful in its second season, offering a hopeful, generous view tinged with bittersweet melancholy that consistently avoids stumbling into sentimentality." Metacritic assigned a score of 85 out of 100 based on 4 critics, indicating "universal acclaim". For the third season, Rotten Tomatoes reported a 100% approval rating with an average rating of 8.5/10, based on 5 critic reviews. For the fourth season, Rotten Tomatoes reported a 100% approval rating with an average rating of 8.2/10, based on 8 critic reviews.

The actor Dan Stevens, who appeared on the show, calls it "a brilliant collection of succinct character portraits from a cross-section of New York society." Jenji Kohan said that High Maintenance was one of her favorite recent discoveries, calling the episodes little jewels, "beautiful glimpses into people's lives," "really well crafted," "delicious."

The Guy often interacts with members of the Jewish community in the areas of New York that he services, and he himself is Jewish. This aspect of the series has been noted approvingly by Jewish reviewers for its representation of contemporary Jewish life. Ethnic diversity in the show as it moved from web series to an HBO series has also been noted.
