= Ben Sinclair (actor) =

American screenwriter and actor

- Born: May 16, 1984 (age 42); New York City, U.S.
- Education: Oberlin College
- Occupations: Actor; writer; director; producer
- Spouse: Katja Blichfeld (m. 2010; div. 2016)

Ben Sinclair (born May 16, 1984) is an American actor, writer, director, and producer.

== Early life and education ==
Sinclair grew up in Scottsdale, Arizona. His mother is a cantor at a Reform synagogue; his father is a public school teacher. Sinclair attended Oberlin College.

== Career ==
Sinclair is the co-creator, writer, and star of High Maintenance, a Vimeo web series and HBO television series set in New York City. The series is partially inspired by experiences from his personal life, and first aired in 2012. His final performance as his High Maintenance character was as a small cameo on HBO's Betty, also filmed in New York City.

He also starred in the music video for "Meet Me In A House Of Love" by Cut Copy.

He has also directed six episodes of FXX’s Dave and an episode of Interior Chinatown.

== Personal life ==
Sinclair married his writing partner and High Maintenance co-creator Katja Blichfeld in 2010, after meeting at a 2009 party in Los Angeles. They came up with the idea for the show while on a bicycle ride across the Williamsburg Bridge, and started the show in 2012. Blichfield and Sinclair divorced amicably in 2016, prior to undertaking season two of High Maintenance.

== Filmography ==
=== Film ===
Year	Title	Role	Notes
2012	Safe	Angry Man	
2013	The Happy Sad	Ted	
2015	All Over It	Finn	
2015	Sisters	Construction Worker	
2016	No Pay, Nudity	Young Actor / Oswald	
2017	Fits and Starts	Parking Attendant	
2017	Home Again	Nate	
2020	Save Yourselves!	Raph	
2022	Spin Me Round	Craig	
2024	Night Swim	Pool Tech	

=== Television ===
Year	Title	Role	Notes
2010	Mercy	Wild Eyed Guy	Episode: "There Is No Superwoman"
2010	Law & Order: Special Victims Unit	Jonas Rothenberg	Episode: "Branded"
2011	Onion News Network	Lunatic	Episode: "Stock Market Crash"
2011	30 Rock	Brooklyn Idiot	Episode: "100: Part 1"
2011	The Big C	Homeless Guy	2 episodes
2011	A Gifted Man	Drunk #1	Episode: "In Case of Missed Communication"
2012	Delocated	Friend	Episode: "Friend"
2012–2015	High Maintenance	The Guy	18 episodes; also co-creator, director, and writer
2013	Next Caller	Guy	Episode: "The Tude & the Prude"
2018	Maniac	Proxy Owen Milgrim	Episode: "Option C"
2016–2020	High Maintenance	The Guy	34 episodes; also co-creator, director, and writer
2020	Betty	Biker	Episode: "Ladies on Fire"
2020	The Fungies!	Bacteria Monster	Episode: "The Fanciest Fungie"
2021	Dave	Atoms	Episode: "Enlightened Dave"
2021–2023	Teenage Euthanasia	Kirk/Dirk/Pete's Friend	Episodes: "Dada M.I.A." and "Viva La Flappanista"
2022	The Resort	Alex	
2023	Poker Face	Boss	Episode: "Exit Stage Death"; also director
2024	Interior Chinatown	—N/a	Episode: "Delivery Guy"; director only
